= Japanese military aircraft designation systems =

The Japanese military aircraft designation systems for the Imperial period (pre-1945) had multiple designation systems for each armed service. This led to the Allies' use of code names during World War II, and these code names are still better known in English-language texts than the real Japanese names for the aircraft. A number of different schemes were simultaneously in use.

== Imperial Japanese Navy Air Service ==
The Imperial Japanese Navy Air Service (大日本帝國海軍航空隊, Dai-Nippon Teikoku Kaigun Koukuu-tai; IJNAS) used several different aircraft designation systems simultaneously. Between 1931 and 1945, aircraft had Shi numbers designating the specification they were designed to. They also had a long form of Type and Model Number system used between 1920 and 1943, a short designation system akin to that of the United States Navy in use between the late 1920s and 1945, a system of popular names introduced to replace type numbers from 1943 through 1945.

=== Specification Shi numbers ===
Japanese Navy specifications from 1931 were given an experimental, or Shi (試) number, based on the year of the Emperor's reign the specification was issued in. Since multiple specifications could be issued in a year, the number was disambiguated with the aircraft purpose.

During the period this designation system was in use, the Emperor in question was Hirohito, the Showa Emperor, thus the years of Showa were those used, which began in 1926.

Thus, the Mitsubishi Zero was designed to meet the 1937 specification called 12-shi carrier fighter.

=== Long Type and Model Number system ===
After 1929, aircraft types were given a type number based on the last two digits of the Japanese imperial year (which is counted from the mythical founding of Japan in 660BC by Emperor Jimmu). Added to this was a brief description of the aircraft's function. The Mitsubishi Zero was so-called because entered service in 1940 which was the Japanese year 2600, thus it was designated Type 0 Carrier Fighter.

Model numbers were added to show subtypes. By the late 1930s these were two digits, the first being airframe revisions, the second engine revisions.

The system was abandoned in 1943, when it was decided that it gave away too much information about the aircraft.

=== Short system ===
In the late 1920s a short designation scheme was adopted, which was similar to the 1922 United States Navy aircraft designation system. This scheme used a letter or two letters to designate a type of aircraft, a number to indicate the Navy Design Request Number in that type of aircraft, and finally a letter to designate the manufacturer. Unlike the US Navy system, the Japanese system did not have a different number series for each manufacturer, and did not omit the number "1".

Thus, the Zero's type in this designation system was A6M, which meant the sixth type of carrier fighter under this designation system, and that it was built by Mitsubishi.

Variants were indicated by an additional number at the end; repurposing an aircraft was indicated by a dash and then the new type letter.

Sometimes two aircraft were ordered from different manufacturers to the same specification at the same time, generally as insurance against the primary design not working out. In this case, the same series number was used for both. Data from:Japanese Military Aircraft Designations

Aircraft type letters
Letter	Characters	Western letters	Type of Aircraft
A	艦上戦闘機	Kanjyo Sento-ki	Carrier-based fighter
B	艦上攻撃機	Kanjyo Kougeki-ki	Carrier-based attack bomber
C	艦上偵察機	Kanjyo Teisatsu-ki	Carrier-based Reconnaissance
D	艦 上爆撃機	Kanjyo Bakugeki-ki	Carrier-based dive bomber
E	水上偵察機	Suijyo Teisatsu-ki	Reconnaissance seaplane
F	水上観測機	Suijyo Kansoku-ki	Observation seaplane
G	陸上攻撃機	Rikujo Kougeki-ki	Land-based attack bomber
H	飛行艇	Hiko-tei	Flying boat
J	陸上戦闘機	Rikujyo Sento-ki	Land-based fighter
K	練習機	Renshuu-ki	Trainer
L	輸送機	Yuso-ki	Transport
M	特殊機	Tokushu-ki	Special purpose
N	水上戦闘機	Suijyo Sento-ki	Seaplane fighter
P	陸上爆撃機	Rikujyo Bakugeki-ki	Land-based bomber
Q	哨戒機	Shokaiki	Patrol aircraft
R	陸上偵察機	Rikujyo Teisatsu-ki	Land-based reconnaissance
S	夜間戦闘機	Yakan Sento-ki	Night fighter
X	実験	Tokushu-ki (Jikken)	Experiment (used with other designations)

Manufacturer letters
Letter	Japanese Manufacturers	Foreign Manufacturers
A	Aichi	North American
B	n/a	Boeing
C	n/a	Consolidated
D	Showa	Douglas
F	n/a	Grumman
G	Hitachi	Goodyear
H	Hiro	Hawker
He	n/a	Heinkel
J	Nihon	Junkers
K	Kawanishi	Kinner
M	Mitsubishi	Airspeed
N	Nakajima	n/a
P	Nihon	Potez
S	Sasebo	n/a
Si	Showa	n/a
V	n/a	Vought
W	Watanabe/Kyūshū	n/a
Y	Yokosuka	n/a
Z	Mizuno	n/a

=== Official names ===
After July 1943, names were given to Navy aircraft instead of type designations. These names were given according to a scheme based on the aircraft's role. These were official names, in contrast to Army aircraft whose names were popular nicknames.

- Fighters: Weather and meteorological names
  - Carrier fighters and seaplane fighters: Wind names usually ending with pū or fū (風)
  - Interceptors: Lightning names ending in den (電)
  - Night fighters: Light names ending in kō (光)
- Attack planes: Mountains names ending in zan (山)
- Bombers: Star or constellation names usually ending in sei (星)
- Patrol: Sea or ocean names ending in kai (海) or yō (洋)
- Reconnaissance: Cloud names ending in un (雲)
- Trainers: Trees, plants and flowers
- Transports: Sky names ending in kū (空)
- Miscellaneous: Landscape names
- Purpose-built kamikaze aircraft: Flower names ending in ka (花)

Special cases include aircraft that employed non-conventional (i.e. non-propeller-driven) propulsion schemes like the rocket-powered interceptor Shūsui (poetic term meaning "Sharp Sword") and aircraft used for non-conventional deployments such as Special Attacker Seiran ("Mountain Haze"; deployed from submarines to strike targets behind the frontline and expected to be ditched upon returning to motherships).

== Imperial Japanese Army Air Service ==
The Imperial Japanese Army Air Service (often called the Imperial Japanese Army Air Force (大日本帝國陸軍航空隊、大日本帝國陸軍航空部隊, Dainippon Teikoku Rikugun Kōkūtai, Dainippon Teikoku Rikugun Kōkūbutai) (IJAAS) used a straightforward system based on year of service and type, nearly identical to the Navy's long type and model number system. This system was used from 1927, replacing an earlier system in which a manufacturer type code from a Japanese Kanji ordinal from the Heavenly stems was assigned to the aircraft from each company, as well as a type number. With additional types being added, this system quickly became cumbersome. Assigned letters included "Kō" (甲, A) for Nieuport, "Otsu" (乙, B) for Salmson, "Hei" (丙, C) for SPAD, "Tei" (丁, D) for Farman, "Bō" (戊, E) for Caudron, and "Ki" (己, F) for Hanriot. The "Ki" (キ) was also used and became prominent in later years.

=== Long Type and Model Number system ===
The first part of the designation was a two-digit type number based on the Japanese year in which the aircraft entered service. A minor exception was the year 1940 (2600), for which the type number 100 rather than zero was used. This was followed by a description of the aircraft's function. If there were two or more aircraft with the same type and function, the latter was enhanced to further differentiate them. An example is the Type 2 single-seat fighter (the Nakajima Ki-44) and the Type 2 two-seat fighter (Kawasaki Ki-45).

Major modifications (such as a different engine) were indicated with a subtype number, officially in kanji but often in Roman numerals. Small-scale modifications (such as armament) are indicated with a Japanese Kanji ordinal from the Heavenly stems:- kō (甲), otsu (乙), hei (丙), tei (丁), bo (戊), ki (己), which equate to:- a (first), b (second), c (third), d (fourth), e (fifth), but are NOT direct translations. The character "kai"(改) was used if the modifications were large but not enough for a new type number.

=== Short designation ("Ki" number) ===
The "Ki" (キ, abbreviation of kitai, "airframe") airframe designation indicates the project number (written in Arabic numerals), and was assigned in sequence to all projects regardless of manufacturer or type.

In the same way, gliders use the "Ku" (ク) designation, and autogyros the "Ka" (カ).

=== Popular names ===
Popular names such as "Hayabusa" (the Nakajima Ki-43) were not part of the official designation.

== Calendars and Type numbers ==
Data from:

Type numbers were assigned by both the Army and Navy followed the Taisho number sequence, the number of years the Emperor Taisho had been on the throne until Emperor Showa replaced him on 25 December 1926, which started the Showa sequence, at which time, the numbering was matched to the last two, or later one digit of the Imperial Japanese calendar year. The Navy began assigning Shisaku numbers to denote experimental types being evaluated by the Navy, whose numbering matched those of the Showa sequence. As no new designs were assigned Type numbers between 26 December 1926 and the end of the year, no aircraft was designated Type 86 under the Showa sequence. The Taisho/Showa sequences were used for almost all equipment developed for both Army and Navy (including weapons, equipment, vehicles and even ships), so there can be many unrelated pieces of equipment covered under a single Type number.

Year	Japanese Year	Nengo Era	Type number	Shisaku number
1921	2581	Taisho 10	Type 10	
1922	2582	Taisho 11	Type 11	
1923	2583	Taisho 12	Type 12	
1924	2584	Taisho 13	Type 13	
1925	2585	Taisho 14	Type 14	
1926	2586	Taisho 15/Showa 1	Type 15	
1927	2587	Showa 2	Type 87	
1928	2588	Showa 3	Type 88	
1929	2589	Showa 4	Type 89	
1930	2590	Showa 5	Type 90	
1931	2591	Showa 6	Type 91	6-Shi
1932	2592	Showa 7	Type 92	7-Shi
1933	2593	Showa 8	Type 93	8-Shi
1934	2594	Showa 9	Type 94	9-Shi
1935	2595	Showa 10	Type 95	10-Shi
1936	2596	Showa 11	Type 96	11-Shi
1937	2597	Showa 12	Type 97	12-Shi
1938	2598	Showa 13	Type 98	13-Shi
1939	2599	Showa 14	Type 99	14-Shi
1940	2600	Showa 15	Type 100 or 0	15-Shi
1941	2601	Showa 16	Type 1	16-Shi
1942	2602	Showa 17	Type 2	17-Shi
1943	2603	Showa 18	Type 3	18-Shi
1944	2604	Showa 19	Type 4	19-Shi
1945	2605	Showa 20	Type 5	20-Shi

== Designation table ==
This is a sortable table giving all the various designations and names of Japanese Military aircraft from circa 1925 to 1945. Data from: and []

=== Imperial Japanese Navy Air Service aircraft designations ===
Manufacturer name & Short Designation	Official (long) Designation (All "types" are Navy)	Experimental Designation	Japanese Name	Allied Code Name(s)	Notes
Nakajima A1N	Type 3 Carrier Fighter				Biplane; licensed copy of the Gloster Gambet
Nakajima A2N	Type 90 Carrier Fighter				Biplane
Nakajima A3N	Type 90 Training Fighter				Two-seat biplane trainer developed from the A2N
Nakajima A4N	Type 95 Carrier Fighter				Biplane
Mitsubishi A5M	Type 96 Carrier Fighter	9-shi Carrier Fighter		CLAUDE/SANDY	
Mitsubishi A5M4-K	Type 96 Training Fighter				trainer variant
Watanabe A5M4-K	Type 2 Training Fighter	15-shi Fighter-Trainer			trainer variant
Mitsubishi A6M	Type 0 Carrier Fighter	12-shi Carrier Fighter		ZEKE/HAMP/HAP	Unofficially Zero
Mitsubishi A6M2-K/A6M5-K	Training Fighter			ZEKE	Trainer version of A6M
Nakajima A6M2-N	Type 2 Fighter Seaplane	15-shi Fighter Seaplane		RUFE	Floatplane variant of A6M
Mitsubishi A7M		17-shi Ko (A) Type Carrier Fighter	Reppū (Strong Wind)	SAM	
Heinkel A7He	Type He Air Defence Fighter			JERRY	Heinkel He 112
Kawanishi A8K		20-Shi Carrier Fighter			Project, carrier-based fighter based on the J6K
Mitsubishi A8M		20-Shi Carrier Fighter	Rikufu (Land Breeze)		Project
Nakajima A8N		20-Shi Carrier Fighter			Project
Seversky A8V	Type S Two-seat Fighter			DICK	
Boeing AXB	Type B Carrier Fighter				One tested
Canadian Car and Foundry AXG	Type G Carrier Fighter				One tested
Dewoitine AXD	Type D Carrier Fighter				One tested
Hawker AXH	Type H Carrier Fighter				One tested
Heinkel AXHe	Type He Interceptor Fighter				Three tested
Vought AXV	Type V Interceptor Fighter				One tested
Mitsubishi B1M	Type 13 Carrier Attack Bomber				Biplane
Mitsubishi B2M	Type 89 Carrier Attack Bomber				Biplane
Kugisho B3Y	Type 92 Carrier Attack Bomber				Biplane
Mitsubishi B4M		9-shi Carrier Torpedo Attacker			Biplane
Nakajima B4N		9-shi Carrier Torpedo Attacker			Lost to B4Y1
Yokosuka B4Y	Type 96 Carrier Attack Bomber	9-shi Carrier Torpedo Attacker		JEAN	
Mitsubishi B5M	Type 97-2 Carrier Attack Bomber	10-shi Carrier Torpedo Attacker		MABEL	
Nakajima B5N	Type 97-1 & 97-2 Carrier Attack Bomber	10-shi Carrier Torpedo Attacker		KATE	
Nakajima B5N1-K	Type 97 Model 1 Attacker-Trainer			KATE	B5N Trainer version
Nakajima B6N	Carrier Attack Bomber Tenzan	14-shi Carrier Torpedo Attacker	Tenzan (Heavenly Mountain)	JILL	
Aichi B7A	Carrier Attack Bomber Ryūsei	16-shi Carrier Torpedo Attacker	Ryūsei (Shooting Star)	GRACE	
Aichi B8A		20-shi Special Torpedo Bomber	Mokusei (Jupiter)		Project
Northrop BXN					2 imported
Mitsubishi C1M	Type 10 Carrier Reconnaissance Aircraft				Biplane
Nakajima C2N	Fokker Reconnaissance Aircraft				Naval version of Ki-6
Nakajima C3N	Type 97 Carrier Reconnaissance Aircraft	10-shi Carrier (Land) Reconnaissance			Not proceeded with
Aichi C4A		13-shi High-speed Reconnaissance Plane			Project
Mitsubishi C5M	Type 98 Reconnaissance Aircraft			BABS	
Nakajima C6N	Carrier Reconnaissance Aircraft Saiun	17-shi Carrier (Land) Reconnaissance	Saiun (Iridescent Cloud)	MYRT	
Potez CXP1					One tested (diesel)
Aichi D1A	Type 94 Carrier Bomber	8-shi Carrier Dive Bomber		SUSIE	
Aichi D1A2/D2A	Type 96 Carrier Bomber			SUSIE	
Nakajima D2N		8-shi Carrier Bomber			Lost to D1A
Yokosuka D2Y		8-shi Carrier Bomber			Lost to D1A
Aichi D3A	Type 99 Carrier Bomber	11-shi Carrier Dive Bomber		VAL	
Mitsubishi D3M		11-shi Carrier Bomber			Lost to D3A
Nakajima D3N		11-shi Carrier Bomber			Lost to D3A
Yokosuka D3Y1-K/D3Y2-K	Type 99 Bomber Trainer		Myōjō (Venus)		Trainer version of D3A
Yokosuka D4Y	Carrier Bomber Suisei	13-shi Carrier Dive Bomber	Suisei (Comet)	JUDY/DOT	
Yokosuka D4Y1-C/D4Y2-R	Type 2 Reconnaissance Aircraft			JUDY	Reconnaissance version of D4Y
Yokosuka D5Y	Special Attacker Myōjō Kai				Production designation for D3Y2-K
Douglas DXD	Type D Attack Plane				One tested
Heinkel DXHe	Type He Attack Plane				One tested
Yokosuka E1Y	Type 14-1 Reconnaissance Seaplane				Biplane
Nakajima E2N	Type 15 Reconnaissance Seaplane				Biplane
Aichi E3A	Type 90-1 Reconnaissance Seaplane				Biplane
Nakajima E4N	Type 90-2 Reconnaissance Seaplane				Biplane
Nakajima E4N2-C	Type 90-2-3 Reconnaissance Aircraft				Landplane version of E4N2
Kawanishi E5K	Type 90-3 Reconnaissance Seaplane				Biplane
Yokosuka E5Y	Type 14-2 Kai-1 Reconnaissance Seaplane				Biplane
Yokosuka E6Y	Type 91 Reconnaissance Seaplane				Biplane
Aichi E7A		7-shi Reconnaissance Seaplane			Lost to E7K
Kawanishi E7K	Type 94 Reconnaissance Seaplane	7-shi Sea Reconnaissance		ALF	
Aichi E8A		8-shi Reconnaissance Seaplane			Lost to E8N1
Kawanishi E8K		8-shi Reconnaissance Seaplane			Lost to E8N1
Nakajima E8N	Type 95 Reconnaissance Seaplane	8-shi Sea Reconnaissance		DAVE	
Watanabe E9W	Type 96 Small Reconnaissance Seaplane	9-shi Sea Reconnaissance		SLIM	Biplane
Aichi E10A	Type 96 Night Reconnaissance Seaplane	9-shi Sea Reconnaissance		HANK	Biplane flying boat
Kawanishi E10K	Type 94 Transport Seaplane	9-shi Sea Reconnaissance			Biplane flying boat
Aichi E11A	Type 98 Night Reconnaissance Seaplane	11-shi Sea Reconnaissance		LAURA	
Kawanishi E11K	Type 96 Transport Seaplane	11-shi Sea Reconnaissance			Lost to E11A1
Aichi E12A		12-shi Two-seat Reconnaissance Seaplane			
Kawanishi E12K		12-shi Two-seat Reconnaissance Seaplane			Project
Nakajima E12N		12-shi Two-seat Reconnaissance Seaplane			Lost to E12K
Aichi E13A	Type 0 Reconnaissance Seaplane	12-shi Sea Reconnaissance		JAKE	
Kawanishi E13K		12-shi Three-seat Reconnaissance Seaplane			Lost to E13A
Watanabe E14W		12-shi Small Reconnaissance Seaplane			
Yokosuka E14Y	Type 0 Small Reconnaissance Seaplane	12-shi Sea Reconnaissance		GLEN	
Kawanishi E15K	Type 2 High-speed Reconnaissance Seaplane Shiun	14-shi Sea Reconnaissance	Shiun (Violet Cloud)	NORM	
Aichi E16A	Reconnaissance Seaplane Zuiun	16-shi Sea Reconnaissance	Zuiun (Auspicious Cloud)	PAUL	
Aichi F1A		10-shi Observation Seaplane			Lost to F1M1
Kawanishi F1K		10-shi Observation Seaplane			Lost to F1M1
Mitsubishi F1M	Type 0 Observation Seaplane	10-shi Sea Observation		PETE	
Mitsubishi G1M	Type 93 Land-based Attack	7-shi Twin-engine Carrier			Biplane
Mitsubishi G1M		8-shi Special Reconnaissance, later 8-Shi Land-based Medium Attack			Long Range Research, not 7-shi
Hiro G2H	Type 95 Attack Bomber	7-shi Land Attacker			Monoplane
Mitsubishi G3M	Type 96 Attack Bomber	9-shi Land Attacker		NELL	
Mitsubishi G4M	Type 1 Attack Bomber	12-shi Land Attacker		BETTY	
Nakajima G5N		13-shi Attack Bomber Shinzan	Shinzan (Deep Mountain)	LIZ	
Mitsubishi G6M	Type 1 Wingtip Convoy Fighter			BETTY	
Mitsubishi G6M1-K	Type 1 Large Land Trainer			BETTY	Trainer variant of G6M
Mitsubishi G6M1-L2	Type 1 Transport			BETTY	Transport variant of G6M
Mitsubishi G7M		16-shi Attack Bomber Taizan	Taizan (Great Mountain)		Project
Nakajima G8N		18-shi Attack Bomber Renzan	Renzan (Mountain Range)	RITA	
Kawanishi G9K					Land-based attack bomber based on H8K, project; G9K is a post-war extrapolation
Nakajima G10N	Super Heavy Bomber Fugaku		Fugaku (Mount Fuji)		Project; G10N is a post-war extrapolation
Hiro H1H	Type 15 Flying boat				Biplane
Hiro H2H	Type 89 Flying boat				Biplane
Hiro H3H	Type 90-1 Flying boat				Monoplane
Kawanishi H3K	Type 90-2 Flying boat			BELLE	Biplane
Hiro H4H	Type 91 Flying boat				Monoplane
Yokosuka H5Y	Type 99 Flying boat	9-shi Flying Boat		CHERRY	
Kawanishi H6K	Type 97 Flying boat	9-shi Flying Boat		MAVIS	
Kawanishi H6K2-L/H6K4-L	Type 97 Transport Flying boat			MAVIS	Unarmed transport version of H6K
Yokosuka H7Y		12-shi Special Flying boat		TILLIE	Project
Kawanishi H8K	Type 2 Flying boat	13-shi Flying Boat		EMILY	
Kawanishi H8K1-L	Type 2 Transport Flying Boat		Seikū (Clear Sky)	EMILY	Armed transport variant of H8K1
Kawanishi H8K2-L	Seikū, Model 32		Seikū (Clear Sky)	EMILY	Armed transport variant of H8K2
Kawanishi H8K4-L	Seikū, Model 33		Seikū (Clear Sky)	EMILY	Armed transport variant of H8K4, project
Aichi H9A	Type 2 Training Flying boat	13-shi Flying Boat			
Hiro H10H		14-shi Medium Flying boat			Project
Kawanishi H11K1-L	Large-size Transport Flying boat Sōkū		Sōkū (Blue Sky)		Project
Consolidated HXC	Type C Flying boat				One tested
Douglas HXD	Type D Flying boat				Two tested
Potez HXP1					One tested
Nakajima J1N		13-shi Three-seat Fighter	Gekkō (Moonlight)		
Nakajima J1N1-C/J1N1-R	Type 2 Reconnaissance Aircraft	13-shi Land Reconnaissance		IRVING	Long-range reconnaissance variant of J1N
Nakajima J1N1-S	Night Fighter Gekkō	13-shi Night Fighter	Gekkō (Moonlight)	IRVING	Night fighter variant of J1N
Mitsubishi J2M	Land Fighter Raiden	14-shi Interceptor	Raiden (Lightning Bolt)	JACK	
Kawanishi J3K		17-shi Otsu (B) Type Interceptor Fighter			Project
Mitsubishi J4M		17-shi Otsu (B) Type Interceptor Fighter Senden	Senden (Flashing Lightning)	LUKE	Project
Nakajima J5N		18-shi Otsu (B) Type Interceptor Fighter Tenrai	Tenrai (Heavenly Thunder)		
Kawanishi J6K		18-shi Otsu (B) Type Interceptor Fighter Jinpū	Jinpū (Squall)		Project
Kyushu J7W		18-shi Otsu (B) Type Interceptor Fighter Shinden	Shinden (Magnificent Lightning)		
Mitsubishi J8M		19-shi Rocket-Powered Interceptor Fighter Shūsui	Shūsui (Sharp Sword)		Army Ki-200
Nakajima Kikka	Special Attacker Kikka/Imperial Weapon No.2		Kikka (Orange Blossom)		First Japanese jet aircraft
Yokosuka K1Y	Type 13 Training Seaplane				Biplane
Yokosuka K2Y	Type 3 Primary Trainer				Avro 504
Mitsubishi K3M	Type 90 Operations Trainer			PINE	
Yokosuka K4Y	Type 90 Training Seaplane				
Yokosuka K5Y	Type 93 Advanced Trainer			WILLOW	
Kawanishi K6K		11-shi Advanced Trainer Seaplane			Cancelled
Mitsubishi K6M		11-shi Advanced Trainer Seaplane			Cancelled
Watanabe K6W		11-shi Advanced Trainer Seaplane			Cancelled
Mitsubishi K7M		11-shi Crew Trainer			Cancelled
Kawanishi K8K	Type 0 Primary Trainer Seaplane	12-shi Primary Trainer Seaplane			Biplane
Nihon K8P		12-shi Primary Trainer Seaplane			Cancelled
Watanabe K8W		12-shi Primary Trainer Seaplane			Lost to K8K
Kyushu K9W	Type 2 Primary Trainer Momiji	14-shi Trainer	Momiji (Red Leaf)	CYPRESS	Bücker Bü 131
Kyūshū K10W	Type 2 Intermediate Trainer	14-shi Land Middle Trainer		OAK	
Kyushu K11W	Operations Trainer Shiragiku	15-shi Trainer	Shiragiku (White Chrysanthemum)		
North American KXA	Type A Intermediate Trainer				Two tested
Bücker KXBu	Type Bu Primary Trainer				Bücker Bü 131
Caudron KXC	Type C Trainer				One tested
Heinkel KXHe	Type He Trainer				One tested
Junkers KXJ	Type J Trainer				One tested
Lockheed KXL	Type L Trainer				One tested
Nakajima L1N	Type 97 Transport			THORA	Naval version of Ki-34
Showa/Nakajima L2D	Type D Transport & Type 0 Transport			TABBY	licence-built Douglas DC-3
Yokosuka L3Y	Type 96 Transport			TINA	Converted G3M
Mitsubishi L4M				TOPSY	Naval version of Ki-57-I
L5?	Unidentified transport				No details
L6?	Unidentified transport				No details
Nihon L7P		13-shi Small Amphibious Transport			Cancelled
Curtiss-Wright LXC	Type C Amphibious Transport				One tested
Douglas LXD	Type D Transport				One tested
Fairchild LXF	Type F Amphibious Transport				One tested.
Gasuden LXG	Special Liaison Transport				KR-2 for VIP use.
Grumman LXG	Grumman Amphibian Flying Boat				One Grumman Goose tested
Heinkel LXHe	Type He Transport				One tested.
Kinner LXK	Type K Transport				One tested.
Airspeed LXM	Type M Transport				Two tested.
Aichi M6A	Special Attack Bomber Seiran	17-shi special Attacker	Seiran (Clear Sky Storm)		
Aichi M6A1-K	Special Attack Training Bomber Nanzan		Nanzan (South Mountain)		Trainer variant of M6A
Nihon MXJ1	Primary Training Glider Wakakusa	17-shi Exp. Research Plane	Wakakusa (Young Grass)		
Yokosuka MXY1	Test Aircraft	Prototype Experimental Aircraft No. 1			Research
Yokosuka MXY2	Test Aircraft	Prototype Experimental Aircraft No. 2			Research
Yokosuka MXY3	Target Glider				Target drone
Yokosuka MXY4	Yokosuka Navy Type 1 Target Aircraft				Target drone
Yokosuka MXY5	Transport Glider	16-shi Special Transport			
Yokosuka MXY6	Ente-type Glider				unpowered glider for J7W development
Yokosuka MXY7	Special Attack Aircraft Ohka		Ohka (Cherry blossom)	BAKA	
Yokosuka MXY8	Training Glider Akigusa		Akigusa (Autumn grass)		
Yokosuka MXY9	Trainer Shūka		Shūka (Autumn flower)		Glider
Yokosuka MXY10	Bomber Ginga Ground Decoy				for P1Y
Yokosuka MXY11	Type 1 Attack Bomber Ground Decoy				for G4M
Mizuno MXZ1		17-shi Exp. Research Plane			Training glider
Kawanishi N1K	Fighter Seaplane Kyōfū	15-shi Fighter Seaplane	Kyōfū (Strong Wind)	REX	
Kawanishi N1K1-J	Land Fighter Shiden		Shiden (Violet Lightning)	GEORGE	Landplane version of N1K
Kawanishi N1K2-J/N1K5-J	Land Fighter Shiden Kai		Shiden (Violet Lightning) modified	GEORGE	Landplane version of N1K2; N1K5-J was a projected high-altitude interceptor version
Kawanishi N1K2-K	Training Fighter Shiden Kai Rensen		Shiden (Violet Lightning) modified	GEORGE	Trainer version of N1K2
Yokosuka P1Y	Bomber Ginga	15-shi Land Bomber	Ginga (Galaxy)	FRANCES	
Yokosuka P1Y1-S	Night Fighter Ginga Model 21	15-shi Night Fighter			Night fighter version of P1Y1
Yokosuka P1Y2-S	Night Fighter Kyokkō	15-shi Night Fighter	initially Hakkō (Corona), later Kyokkō (Aurora)		Night fighter version of P1Y2
Kyushu Q1W	Patrol Plane Tōkai	17-shi Patrol	Tōkai (Eastern Sea)	LORNA	
Mitsubishi Q2M		19-shi Patrol Plane Taiyo	Tai'yō (Great Sea)		ASW derivative of the Ki-67; project
Kyushu Q3W	Patrol Plane Nankai		Nankai (Southern Sea)		Based on K11W
Yokosuka R1Y		17-shi Reconnaissance Plane Seiun	Seiun (Dawn Cloud)		Cancelled
Yokosuka R2Y		18-shi Reconnaissance Plane Keiun	Keiun (Cirrus Cloud)		
Aichi S1A		18-shi Hei C Type Night Fighter Denkō	Denkō (Bolt of Light)		
n/a			Yasukuni (Shrine)		Ki-67-I loaned from Army
n/a	n/a	6-shi Carrier Bomber			Nakajima
n/a	n/a	7-shi Carrier Fighter			
n/a	n/a	7-shi Carrier Fighter			Nakajima Army Type 91 fighter for the Navy
n/a	n/a	9-shi Carrier Fighter			Army's Nakajima Ki-11
n/a	n/a	7-shi Carrier Torpedo Attacker			Aichi Biplane
n/a	n/a	7-shi Carrier Torpedo Attacker			Mitsubishi Biplane
n/a	n/a	7-shi Carrier Torpedo Attacker			Nakajima Biplane
n/a	Type 10 Carrier Torpedo Bomber				Triplane
n/a	n/a	6-shi Carrier Dive Bomber			Nakajima, Crashed
n/a	n/a	7-shi Carrier Dive Bomber			Nakajima
n/a	n/a	17-shi Land Bomber			Kawanishi K-100
n/a	n/a	6-shi Night Reconnaissance Flying Boat			Aichi (flying boat biplane)
n/a	n/a	6-shi Two-seat Carrier Fighter			Nakajima NAF-1
n/a	n/a	8-shi Two-seat Carrier Fighter			Mitsubishi Ka-8, crashed
n/a	n/a	8-shi Two-seat Carrier Fighter			Nakajima NAF-2, Cancelled
n/a	Special Attack		Sukukaze (Cool Breeze)	OMAR	Fictional
n/a	Special Attack Glider Shinryū		Shinryū (Divine Dragon)		Mizuno project
n/a	Experimental Special Attacker 1		Tōka (Wisteria flower)		Navy Nakajima Ki-115
n/a	Experimental Attack Plane 1		Tozan (Eastern Mountain)		
n/a	Type 97 Reconnaissance Seaplane?			BOB (Note: Misidentified)	Aichi
n/a	Type 98 Bomber Float Plane?			IONE	Aichi
n/a	Type 99 Four-Engine Flying Boat?			JOAN	Unknown company
n/a	Type 99 Single-Engine Dive Bomber Seaplane?				Aichi
n/a	Type 1 Single-Seat Fighter?			ZEKE	Mitsubishi
n/a	Type 96 Carrier Fighter?			SANDY	Mitsubishi
n/a	Type 97 Seaplane Fighter			ADAM	Nakajima, Fictional
n/a	Type 1 Dive Bomber?			DOT	Nakajima
Nakajima E7K	Type 97 Seaplane Fighter			ADAM	
n/a	Type 99 Flying Boat			JOAN	Unknown company
n/a	Type T.K.19 Fighter			JOE	Fictional
n/a	Type 99 Dive Bomber Seaplane			JUNE	floatplane D3A
Nagoya Sento-ki 001	Sento-ki 001 Carrier Fighter			JUNE	fictional
n/a	Ka-1 observation aircraft				Kayaba Ka-1 Army autogyro
n/a	Ka-2 observation aircraft				Kayaba Ka-2 Army autogyro
n/a	Special Attack Aircraft Baika		Baika (Ume Blossom)		Kawanishi, project

=== Imperial Japanese Army Air Service aircraft designations ===
Ki(キ)/Ku(ク)/Ka(カ) number	Manufacturer	Official Designation or (Role)	Japanese Popular Name	Allied Code Name(s)	Notes
Ka-1	Kayaba	Ka-gō observation aircraft			Autogyro
Ka-2	Kayaba	Ka-gō observation aircraft			Autogyro
Ki-1	Mitsubishi	Type 93 Heavy Bomber			Monoplane
Ki-2	Mitsubishi	Type 93-2 Twin-Engine Light Bomber		LOUISE	Monoplane
Ki-3	Kawasaki	Type 93 Single-Engine Light Bomber			Last IJA biplane bomber
Ki-4	Nakajima	Type 94 Reconnaissance			Last IJA reconnaissance biplane
Ki-5	Kawasaki	(Fighter)			Monoplane; prototypes only
Ki-6	Nakajima	Type 95 Model 2 Trainer			License-built Fokker Super Universal
Ki-7	Mitsubishi	(Operations Trainer)			Navy K3M; lost to Ki-6
Ki-8	Nakajima	(Fighter)			Inverted gull-wing
Ki-9	Tachikawa	Type 95 Model 1 Trainer	Churen – intermediate trainer	SPRUCE	
Ki-10	Kawasaki	Type 95 Fighter		PERRY	Last IJA fighter biplane
Ki-11	Nakajima	(Fighter)			Prototypes only; lost to Ki-10
Ki-12	Nakajima	(Fighter)			Prototype only
Ki-13	Nakajima	(Attacker)			Cancelled
Ki-14	Mitsubishi	(Reconnaissance)			Cancelled
Ki-15	Mitsubishi	Type 97 Headquarter Reconnaissance	Karigane – Wild Goose	BABS	Also Navy C5M
Ki-16	Nakajima	(Fuel Transport)			Douglas DC-2 variant
Ki-17	Tachikawa	Type 95 Model 3 Trainer	Shoren – primary trainer	CEDAR	
Ki-18	Mitsubishi	(Fighter)			Army A5M variant; prototype only
Ki-19	Nakajima	(Heavy Bomber)			Prototypes only; lost to Ki-21
Ki-20	Mitsubishi	Type 92 Heavy Bomber			Junkers K.51 design built under license; only six built as they were outdated at the time of introduction
Ki-21	Mitsubishi	Type 97 Heavy Bomber		SALLY/GWEN/JANE	
Ki-22	Kawasaki	(Heavy bomber)			Project; lost to Ki-21
Ki-23	Fukuda	(Training glider)			Prototype only
Ki-24	Tachikawa	(Primary training glider)			DFS SG 38 Schulgleiter built under license
Ki-25	Tachikawa	(Training glider)			
Ki-26	Tachikawa	(Glider)			Cancelled due to the Second Sino-Japanese War
Ki-27	Nakajima	Type 97 Fighter		NATE/CLINT	
Ki-28	Kawasaki	(Fighter)			Prototype only; lost to Ki-27
Ki-29	Tachikawa	(Light Bomber)			Project; lost to Ki-30
Ki-30	Mitsubishi	Type 97 Light Bomber		ANN	
Ki-31	Nakajima	(Light Bomber)			Project; lost to Ki-30
Ki-32	Kawasaki	Type 98 Light Bomber		MARY	
Ki-33	Mitsubishi	(Fighter)			Navy A5M variant, prototype only; lost to Ki-27
Ki-34	Nakajima	Type 97 Transport		THORA	Military version of AT-2
Ki-35	Mitsubishi	(Reconnaissance)			Project; lost to Ki-36
Ki-36	Tachikawa	Type 98 Co-operation Reconnaissance		IDA	Fixed undercarriage
Ki-37	Nakajima	(Fighter)			Project; cancelled in favor of the Ki-38
Ki-38	Kawasaki	(Fighter)			Became Ki-45
Ki-39	Mitsubishi	(Fighter)			Project; cancelled in favor of the Ki-38
Ki-40	Mitsubishi	(HQ Reconnaissance)			Cancelled in favor of the Ki-15
Ki-41	Nakajima	(Transport)			Cancelled
Ki-42	Mitsubishi	(Heavy Bomber)			Project
Ki-43	Nakajima	Type 1 Fighter	Hayabusa (Peregrine Falcon)	OSCAR	
Ki-44	Nakajima	Type 2 Single-seat Fighter	Shoki (Demon)	TOJO/JOHN	
Ki-45	Kawasaki	(Fighter)			Prototype only, improved Ki-38
Ki-45	Kawasaki	Type 2 Two-seat Fighter	Toryū (Dragonslayer)	NICK	Second version of Ki-45
Ki-46	Mitsubishi	Type 100 HQ Reconnaissance		DINAH	
Ki-47	Mitsubishi	(Light Bomber)			Project; lost to Ki-48
Ki-48	Kawasaki	Type 99 Twin-engine Light Bomber		LILY	
Ki-49	Nakajima	Type 100 Heavy Bomber	Donryū (Storm Dragon)	HELEN	
Ki-50	Mitsubishi	(Heavy Bomber)			Project
Ki-51	Mitsubishi	Type 99 Attacker/Army Reconnaissance		SONIA	
Ki-52	Nakajima	(Dive Bomber)			Army version of D3N; cancelled
Ki-53	Nakajima	(Fighter)			Project
Ki-54a	Tachikawa	Type 1 Twin-engine Advanced Trainer		HICKORY	
Ki-54b	Tachikawa	Type 1 Operations Trainer		HICKORY	
Ki-54c	Tachikawa	Type 1 Transport		HICKORY	
Ki-55	Tachikawa	Type 99 Advanced Trainer		IDA	Trainer version of Ki-36
Ki-56	Kawasaki	Type 1 Cargo Transport		THALIA	Type LO/RO variant
Ki-57	Mitsubishi	Type 100 Transport		TOPSY	Navy L4M
Ki-58	Nakajima	(Escort fighter)			Ki-49 variant; prototypes only
Ki-59	Kokusai	Type 1 Transport		THERESA	Commercial TK-3
Ki-60	Kawasaki	(Fighter)			Prototypes only, used inline engine
Ki-61	Kawasaki	Type 3 Fighter	Hien (Flying Swallow)	TONY	
Ki-62	Nakajima	(Fighter)			Project; cancelled by Nakajima to focus on the Ki-43 and Ki-44
Ki-63	Nakajima	(Fighter)			Project; variant of Ki-62 with radial engine
Ki-64	Kawasaki	(Fighter)		ROB	Buried engines
Ki-65	Mitsubishi	(Attacker)			Ki-51 successor project
Ki-65	Manshu	(Heavy Fighter)			Project
Ki-66	Kawasaki	(Dive Bomber)			Prototypes only
Ki-67	Mitsubishi	Type 4 Heavy Bomber	Hiryū (Flying Dragon)	PEGGY	Also interceptor.
Ki-68	Nakajima	(Long-range Bomber)			Army bomber version of naval G5N, project
Ki-69	Mitsubishi	(Escort fighter)			Ki-67 project
Ki-70	Tachikawa	(HQ Reconnaissance)		CLARA	Prototypes only
Ki-71	Manshu	(Attacker)		EDNA	Ki-51 variant
Ki-72	Tachikawa	(Reconnaissance)			Re-engined version of Ki-36 with retractable landing gear, project
Ki-73	Mitsubishi	(Fighter)		STEVE	Project
Ki-74	Tachikawa	(Reconnaissance Bomber)		PAT/PATSY	
Ki-75	Nakajima	(Fighter)			Project
Ki-76	Kokusai	Type 3 Command Liaison		STELLA	Also used for ASW
Ki-77	Tachikawa	(Long-range experimental)			
Ki-78	Kawasaki	(High-speed experimental)	Ken III		
Ki-79	Manshu	Type 2 Advanced Trainer			Ki-27 variant
Ki-80	Nakajima	(Formation Commander)			Ki-49 variant
Ki-81	Kawasaki	(Formation Commander)			Ki-48 variant project
Ki-82	Nakajima	(Heavy Bomber)			Project
Ki-83	Mitsubishi	(Long-range Fighter)			Prototypes only; never produced due to end of WWII
Ki-84	Nakajima	Type 4 Fighter	Hayate (Gale)	FRANK	
Ki-85	Kawasaki	(Bomber)			Army bomber version of naval G5N, project
Ki-86	Kokusai	Type 4 Basic Trainer		CYPRESS	Bücker Bü 131 built under license
Ki-87	Nakajima	(High-altitude Fighter)			Prototype only
Ki-88	Kawasaki	(Fighter)			Mockup only; cancelled as it was inferior to the Ki-61
Ki-89	Kawasaki	(Light Bomber)			Project
Ki-90	Mitsubishi	(Long-range Bomber)			project
Ki-91	Kawasaki	(Long-range Bomber)			Unfinished prototype damaged in air raid; cancelled
Ki-92	Tachikawa	(Transport)			Prototype only
Ki-93	Rikugun	(Attacker)			Prototypes only
Ki-94-I	Tachikawa	(High-altitude Fighter)			Mockup only
Ki-94-II	Tachikawa	(High-altitude Fighter)			Prototype built, but never flew
Ki-95	Mitsubishi	(HQ Reconnaissance)			Ki-83 variant
Ki-96	Kawasaki	(Fighter)			Prototypes only; single-seat variant of Ki-45
Ki-97	Mitsubishi	(Transport)			Ki-67 transport variant project
Ki-98	Manshu	(Fighter)			Prototype only; scrapped before completion to avoid capture by the Soviets
Ki-99	Mitsubishi	(Fighter)			Project
Ki-100	Kawasaki	Type 5 Fighter			Ki-61 variant
Ki-101	Nakajima	(Night Fighter)		PERRY	Project
Ki-102	Kawasaki	Type 4 Assault Aircraft		RANDY	
Ki-103	Mitsubishi	(Attacker)			Ki-83 variant project
Ki-104	Rikugun	(Fighter)			attack variant project of Ki-94; cancelled
Ki-105	Kokusai	(Transport)	Ohtori (Phoenix)	BUZZARD	Powered Ku-7
Ki-106	Tachikawa	(Fighter)		FRANK	Wooden Ki-84; prototypes only
Ki-107	Tokyo Koku	(Primary Trainer)			All-wooden construction
Ki-108	Kawasaki	(High-altitude Fighter)			pressurized cockpit; converted from Ki-102
Ki-109	Mitsubishi	Experimental heavy fighter		PEGGY	Ki-67 with 75mm gun
Ki-110	Tachikawa	(Transport)			Wooden Ki-54; prototype destroyed in US air raid
Ki-111	Tachikawa	(Fuel tanker)			Ki-54 variant project, cancelled
Ki-112	Mitsubishi	(Escort fighter)			Wooden Ki-67 project
Ki-113	Nakajima	(Fighter)			Steel Ki-84
Ki-114	Tachikawa	(Fuel tanker)			All-wood construction, Ki-54 variant; cancelled
Ki-115	Nakajima	(Special Attacker)	Tsurugi (Sabre)		Kamikaze aircraft
Ki-116	Manshu	(Fighter)			Re-engined Ki-84
Ki-117	Nakajima	(Fighter)			Designation for Ki-84N
Ki-118	Mitsubishi	(Fighter)			Army short-range fighter based on A7M; cancelled
Ki-119	Kawasaki	(Dive-bomber/torpedo fighter)			Cancelled while still in development due to end of WWII
Ki-120	Tachikawa	(Transport)			transport variant based on Ki-74
Ki-128	Tachikawa	Special Attack			Kamikaze aircraft
Ki-147	Mitsubishi	I-Gо̄ Model 1 A (radio-guided air to surface missile)			launched from Ki-67
Ki-148	Kawasaki	I-Gо̄ Model 1 B (radio-guided air to surface missile)			launched from Ki-48 and Ki-102
Ki-167	Mitsubishi	Special Attack	Sakura-dan (Cherry Blossom)		Kamikaze Ki-67
Ki-174	Kawasaki	Special Attack			Single-seat Ki-48 project
Ki-200	Mitsubishi	experimental rocket interceptor	Shūsui (Sharp Sword)		Navy J8M
Ki-201	Nakajima	(Fighter-Bomber)	Karyū (Fire Dragon)		Project
Ki-202	Rikugun	(Interceptor)	Shūsui Kai (Sharp Sword improved)		Project, advanced Ki-200
Ki-230	Nakajima	Special Attack			Ki-115 project
Ki-337	Nakajima	(Fighter)			project
Ku-1	Maeda	Maeda Army Type 2 Small Glider			Towed by Ki-51
Ku-2	Tokyo University	(Tailless Research)			
Ku-3	Tokyo University	(Tailless Research)			
Ku-4	Tokyo University	(Research)			Powered Ku-2 project
Ku-5	Fukuda	(Trainer)			research aircraft
Ku-6	Maeda	(Gliding Tank)			Cancelled
Ku-7	Kokusai	Experimental Transport Glider	Manazuru (White-naped crane)	BUZZARD	Became Ki-105
Ku-8	Kokusai	Type 4 Special Transport		GOOSE, later GANDER	Towed by Ki-21
Ku-9	Fukuda	(Transport)			Cancelled
Ku-10	Maeda	(Special Glider Trainer)			
Ku-11	Nihon	(Transport)			Wood
Ku-12	Fukuda	(Glider Trainer)			
Ku-13	Yokosuka	(Glider Trainer)			Army designation for MXY8
Ku-14	Nihon	(Glider Trainer)	Wakakusa		
n/a	Rikugun	Ta-go Special Attacker	Takeyari (Bamboo-spear)		
n/a	Kobe	Te-gō Observer			Lost to Ka-gō
n/a	Kawasaki	Type 87 Heavy Bomber			Dornier Do N
n/a	Mitsubishi	Type 87 Light Bomber			IJN Type 13 Carrier Attacker for Army
n/a	Kawasaki	Type 88 Light Bomber			Type 88 Recon. variant
n/a	Kawasaki	Type 88 Reconnaissance Aircraft			
n/a	Nakajima	Type 91 Fighter			
n/a	Kawasaki	Type 92 Fighter			
n/a	Mitsubishi	Type 92 Reconnaissance			Mitsubishi 2MR8
n/a	Fiat	Type I Heavy Bomber		RUTH	
n/a	Lockheed	Type LO Transport		THELMA/TOBY	
n/a	Vultee	Type 98 Showa Light Bomber		MILLIE	
n/a	Heinkel	Type 98 Medium Bomber		BESS	
n/a	Focke-Wulf	(Technology demonstrator)		FRED	
n/a	Focke-Wulf	(Technology demonstrator)		TRUDY	
n/a	Junkers	(Technology demonstrator)		IRENE	
n/a	Junkers	(Technology demonstrator)		JANICE	
n/a	Junkers	(Technology demonstrator)		TRIXIE	
n/a	Messerschmitt	(Technology demonstrator)		DOC	
n/a	Messerschmitt	(Technology demonstrator)		TRIXIE	
n/a	Nakajima	Type 97 Fighter?		CLINT	
n/a	Nakajima	Type 1 Light Bomber?		JOYCE	
n/a	Kawasaki	Type 1 Single-Seat Fighter?		JIM	
n/a	Kawasaki	Type 97 Medium Bomber?		JULIA	
n/a	Mitsubishi	Mitsubishi Navy Type 97 Fighter		ABDUL	Fictional A5M variant
n/a	Mitsubishi	Type 97 Light Bomber Darai 108		NORMA	Bennett BTC-1
n/a	Mitsubishi	Type 0 Single-Seat Twin-Engine Fighter		FRANK/HARRY	
n/a	Mitsubishi	Type 0 Medium Bomber?		GWEN	
n/a		Medium Bomber		MAISIE	
n/a	Nakajima	Nakajima/Douglas DC-2 transport		TESS	Imported DC-2
n/a	Nakajima	Type AT-27 twin-engine fighter		GUS	fictional aircraft from magazine
n/a	Mitsubishi	Ohtori	Ohtori (Phoenix)	EVE	Civilian Mitsubishi Ki-2-ii

== See also ==
- British military aircraft designation systems
- Japanese aircraft engine identification systems
- List of RLM aircraft designations for the Third Reich
- Mark (designation)
- Type (designation)
- World War II Allied names for Japanese aircraft
