= List of Japanese trainer aircraft during World War II =

This is a List of trainer aircraft (練習機 Renshuu-ki - Trainer) the Japanese used during World War II. Names in quotes are Allied code names for clarity for English speakers and do not reflect the Japanese usage.

== Purpose-Built Trainers ==
=== Basic trainers ===
- Tachikawa Ki-24 Basic training glider
- Kokusai Ki-86/K9W1 "Cypress" (Bücker Bü 131 built under license)
- Tachikawa Ki-9 "Spruce"
- Tachikawa Ki-17 "Cedar"
- Kawanishi K8K Navy Type 0 Primary Trainer Seaplane
- Mitsubishi K3M Navy Type 90 "Pine" also used by Army as Ki-7
- Yokosuka K5Y Navy Type 93 "Willow"
- Tokyo Koku Ki-107

=== Advanced trainers ===
- Mansyu Ki-79 (1 or 2 seat version of Ki-27 fighter modified for training)
- Tachikawa Ki-55 "Ida" (Version of Ki-36 "Ida" modified for training)
- Tachikawa Ki-54 (Model b) "Hickory" (modified for training)
- Nakajima Ki-34 "Thora" (advanced flying and paratroop trainer)
- Kyushu K10W1 Oak Intermediate/Advanced Trainer and Target tug
- Mitsubishi K7M Multi-engine trainer
- Kyushu K11W Shiragiku Navy Operations Trainer
- Mitsubishi A5M A5M2-K "Claude" (2 seat version of fighter)
- Mitsubishi A6M Zero A6M5-K "Zero" (2 seat version of fighter)
- Aichi M6A1-K Nanzan Land based trainer version of Aichi M6A Seiran floatplane.

== Combat Aircraft used as Trainers ==
Many of these were either obsolete types used as trainers, or for crew familiarization similar in concept to the British use of OTU/OCU units and are not strictly trainers.

=== Fighter trainers ===
- Nakajima Type 91 (NC)
- Kawasaki Ki-10 "Perry"
- Nakajima Ki-27 "Nate"
- Nakajima Ki-43 "Oscar"
- Nakajima Ki-44 Shoki "Tojo"
- Nakajima Ki-84 Hayate "Frank"
- Kawasaki Ki-61 Hien "Tony"
- Kawasaki Ki-100 Goshikisen
- Kawasaki Ki-45 Toryu "Nick" (Heavy Fighter)
- Yokoi (Ku) Ki-13 Shusui (Rocket/Jet)

=== Reconnaissance trainers ===
- Mitsubishi Ki-15 "Babs"
- Mitsubishi Ki-46 (II KAI) "Dinah"

=== Light bomber trainers ===
- Kawasaki Type 88 (KDA-2)
- Kawasaki Ki-3
- Nakajima Ki-4
- Mitsubishi Ki-30 "Ann"
- Kawasaki Ki-32 "Mary"
- Tachikawa Ki-36 "Ida"
- Kawasaki Ki-48 "Lily"
- Mitsubishi Ki-51 "Sonia"

=== Twin-engined bomber trainers ===
- Mitsubishi Ki-1
- Mitsubishi Ki-2 "Louise"
- Mitsubishi Ki-21 "Sally"
- Nakajima Ki-49 Donryu "Helen"
- Mitsubishi Ki-67 Hiryu "Peggy"

=== Transport trainers ===
- Kokusai Ki-59 "Theresa"
- Tachikawa Type LO "Thelma"
