= Mitsubishi Aircraft Company =

Japanese aircraft manufacturer

- Romanized name: Mitsubishi Kōkūki
- Industry: Aerospace
- Predecessor: Mitsubishi Internal Combustion
- Founded: 1928
- Defunct: 1934; 92 years ago
- Fate: Merged with Mitsubishi Shipbuilding
- Successor: Mitsubishi Heavy Industries
- Headquarters: Nagoya, Japan
- Products: Aircraft

Mitsubishi Aircraft Company (Mitsubishi Kōkūki) was the new name given by the Mitsubishi Company (Mitsubishi Shōkai), in 1928, to its subsidiary, Mitsubishi Internal Combustion (Mitsubishi Nainenki), to reflect its changing role as an aircraft manufacturer catering to the growing demand for military aircraft in Japan.

== History ==
Mitsubishi Nainenki had been established in Nagoya in 1920, and signed a technology agreement with Junkers in 1925. By 1926, it had become one of the largest aircraft manufacturers in Japan with an output of 69 aircraft and 70 engines.

In 1932, Mitsubishi Aircraft was among the companies that involved in a consolidation process catalysed by the Imperial Japanese Navy's Aviation Arsenal. The Navy launched a three-year program to have the manufacturers develop certain types of aircraft under competition. Most important of them were the Mitsubishi A5M (96-Shiki) Carrier Fighter and Mitsubishi G3M (96-Shiki) Attack Bomber developed by Mitsubishi with engines made by Nakajima Aircraft Company. Introduced in 1936, it had a maximum speed of 450 km/h (280 mph). The famous Mitsubishi A6M ("Zero") fighter was an improvement of the A5M and had a maximum speed of 500 km/h (310 mph). Also, well known was the Mitsubishi Ki-46 (100-Shiki) reconnaissance plane with a maximum speed of 540 km/h (340 mph).

In 1934, the company was merged with Mitsubishi Shipbuilding to become Mitsubishi Heavy Industries (Mitsubishi Jukogyo). It had a prominent role to play in the upsurge of aircraft production in Japan, which shot up from 400 in 1931, to 4,800 in 1941 and peaked at 24,000 in 1944.

== Aircraft ==
=== Company designations ===
- 1MF - 1923 carrier-based biplane fighter
- 1MF9 - 1927 carrier-based biplane fighter prototype; lost to the Nakajima A1N
- 1MF10 - 1933 carrier-based monoplane fighter prototype
- 1MT - 1922 triplane torpedo bomber
- 2MB1 - 1926 biplane light bomber
- 2MB2 - 1925 biplane light bomber prototype
- 2MR - 1922 carrier-based biplane reconnaissance aircraft
- 2MR8 - 1932 parasol monoplane reconnaissance aircraft
- 3MT5 - 1932 carrier-based biplane bomber prototype
- 3MT10 - 1932 carrier-based attack aircraft prototype
- 4MS1 - prototype for K3M
- Ka-8 - 1934 two-seat carrier based fighter prototype

=== Naval aircraft ===
Fighter

- A5M - 'Claude' 1936 carrier-based fighter
- A6M Zero - 'Zeke' 1940 long-range carrier-based fighter; most produced Japanese combat aircraft
- A7M Reppū (Strong Wind) - 'Sam' 1942 carrier-based fighter
- J2M Raiden (Lightning Bolt) - 'Jack' 1942 land-based fighter
- J4M Senden (Flashing Lightning) - 'Luke' land-based interceptor (project only)
- J8M Shūsui (Sharp Sword) - rocket-powered interceptor prototype, based on the Messerschmitt Me 163

Torpedo bomber

- B1M - 1924 biplane torpedo bomber
- B2M - 1932 carrier-based biplane torpedo bomber, based on the Blackburn T.7B
- B4M - 1934 carrier-based biplane torpedo bomber prototype; lost to the Yokosuka B4Y
- B5M - 'Mabel' 1937 carrier-based torpedo bomber

Reconnaissance aircraft

- C1M - later designation of 2MR
- C5M - naval version of Ki-15
- F1M - 'Pete' 1936 observation floatplane; last IJN biplane design

Dive bomber

- D3M - carrier-based dive bomber; lost to the Aichi D3A

Bomber

- G1M - 1934 twin-engine long-range reconnaissance/attack bomber prototype
- G3M - 'Nell' 1935 twin-engine medium bomber/torpedo bomber
- G4M - 'Betty' 1940 twin-engine medium bomber
- G6M - convoy fighter version of G4M
- G7M Taizan (Great Mountain) - twin-engine long-range heavy bomber (project only)
- Tozan (Eastern Mountain) - Experimental Attack Plane

Trainer

- A5M4-K - trainer version of A5M
- A6M2-K - trainer version of A6M
- G6M1-K - trainer version of G6M
- K3M - 'Pine' 1931 single-engine biplane trainer
- K6M - floatplane trainer (project only)
- K7M - 1938 twin-engine monoplane trainer prototype

Transport

- G6M1-L - transport version of G6M
- K3M3-L - transport version of K3M
- L4M - naval version of Ki-57

Patrol aircraft

- Q2M Tai'yō (Great Sea) - twin-engine ASW/patrol aircraft developed from the Ki-67 (project only)

=== Army aircraft ===
Trainer

- Ki N° 1 - license-built Hanriot HD.14
- Kō N° 1 - license-built Nieuport 81 E.2
- Ki-7 - army version of K3M trainer

Bomber

- Ki-1 - 1933 twin-engine heavy bomber
- Ki-2 - 'Louise' 1933 twin-engine light bomber, based on the Junkers K 37
- Ki-20 - 1932 four-engine heavy bomber, based on the Junkers K 51
- Ki-21 - 'Sally'/'Gwen' 1938 twin-engine heavy bomber
- Ki-30 - 'Ann' 1938 single-engine light bomber
- Ki-42 - heavy bomber (project only)
- Ki-47 - light bomber (project only)
- Ki-50 - twin-engine heavy bomber (project only)
- Ki-51 - 'Sonia' 1939 single-engine light bomber/dive bomber
- Ki-67 "Hiryū" (Flying Dragon) - 'Peggy' 1944 twin-engine medium bomber
- Ki-90 - heavy bomber/transport, based on the Junkers Ju 90 (project only)

Reconnaissance aircraft

- Ki-15 "Karigane" (Wild Goose) - 'Babs' 1937 reconnaissance/light bomber aircraft
- Ki-35 - close support/reconnaissance aircraft (project only)
- Ki-40 - strategic reconnaissance aircraft (project only)
- Ki-46 - 'Dinah' 1941 twin-engine reconnaissance aircraft
- Ki-95 - reconnaissance version of Ki-83 (project only)

Transport

- Ki-57 - 'Topsy' 1942 transport aircraft developed from the Ki-21
- Ki-97 - transport version of Ki-67 (project only)

Fighter

- Ki-18 - 1935 single-seat monoplane fighter prototype; lost to the Kawasaki Ki-10
- Ki-33 - 1936 single-seat monoplane fighter prototype; lost to the Nakajima Ki-27
- Ki-39 - two-seat twin-engine heavy fighter (project only)
- Ki-69 - escort fighter version of Ki-67 (project only)
- Ki-73 - 'Steve' single-engine long-range escort fighter
- Ki-83 - 1944 long-range heavy fighter prototype
- Ki-103 - improved Ki-83 (project only)
- Ki-109 - night fighter, day fighter and heavy fighter-interceptor versions of Ki-67
- Ki-112 - escort fighter with wood construction (project only)

Interceptor

- Ki-99 - single-seat short-range interceptor (project only)
- Ki-200 - army version of J8M

Kamikaze aircraft

- Ki-167 "Sakura-dan" (Cherry Blossom) - kamikaze version of Ki-67

=== Civil aircraft ===
- Hinazuru - license-built Airspeed Envoy
- MC-1 - 1928 biplane airliner prototype based on the B1M
- MS-1 - civil transport version of K3M trainer
- MC-20 - civil airliner version of Ki-57 transport
- Ohtori - demilitarized version of Ki-2 for long-range flights

== Engines ==
- Mitsubishi Ha-26 Shinten (震天, Progress; company designation A6(7), also known as MK1 and Ha6) - 14 cylinder, two-row radial engine
- Mitsubishi Ha-31 Zuisei (瑞星, Holy Star; company designation A14, also known as MK2 and Ha26/Ha102) - supercharged 14 cylinder, two-row radial engine
- Mitsubishi Ha-32 Kasei (火星, Mars; company designation A10, also known as MK4 and Ha101/Ha111) - 14 cylinder, two-row radial engine
- Mitsubishi Ha-33 Kinsei (金星, Venus; company designation A8, also known as MK8 and Ha112) - 14 cylinder, two-row radial engine based on the Pratt & Whitney R-1690 Hornet
- Mitsubishi Ha-42 - projected 18 cylinder version of the Kasei
- Mitsubishi Ha-43 (company designation A20; also known as Ha211 and MK9) - prototype 18 cylinder, twin-row radial engine; more powerful development of the Kinsei
