= Mitsubishi Aircraft =

Mitsubishi Aircraft Company may refer to:

- Mitsubishi Aircraft Company, an historical Japanese aircraft company which produced aircraft and engines in the 1920s and 1930s
- Mitsubishi Aircraft Corporation, a modern Japanese aircraft company which produces the Mitsubishi Regional Jet (MRJ)
