= Mitsubishi Ki-73 =

Experimental Japanese long-range escort fighter

Ki-73

General information
- National origin: Japan
- Manufacturer: Mitsubishi Aircraft Company
- Designer: Tomio Kubo
- Status: Cancelled / abandoned in 1945
- Primary user: Imperial Japanese Army Air Service
- Number built: Partially prototype developed

The Mitsubishi Ki-73, Allied reporting name "Steve", was a single-engine super high-speed long-range escort fighter designed by Mitsubishi Aircraft Company for use by the Imperial Japanese Army Air Service in World War II. The plane only reached the partially prototype development before being abandoned and cancelled. The design and the developed prototype was built as a response to a specification for a single-engined long range escort fighter in May 1943. The Ki-73 was designed by Tomio Kubo, who was also responsible for the Mitsubishi Ki-46 and the Mitsubishi Ki-83 twin engine fighters. The need for the Ki-73 came from heavy losses to Japanese bombers in the Pacific War from Allied fighter planes. The war ended on 2 September 1945, before any further development was completed on the Ki-73.

== Design ==
The Mitsubishi Ki-73 was a standard monoplane design with a tail dragger configuration. The Ki-73 was designed with contra-rotating propellers, using two three bladed propellers. The two propellers were driven by a Mitsubishi Ha-203-II engine. The super speed Mitsubishi Ha-203-II engine had 2,600 hp derived from a liquid-cooled engine with 24 cylinders in a horizontal H. The high power engine would have given the plane a top speed of 750 km/h (466 MPH). The plane would have four 20 mm (0.79 in) Ho-5 cannons, two per wing. The Mitsubishi Ha-203-II engine had many problems in development. This complex type engine with two 12 inline cylinders in a horizontal H configuration was successfully built by D. Napier & Son in the Napier Sabre engine and used in the British Hawker Typhoon and Hawker Tempest during the war. Due to the Mitsubishi Ha-203-II engine development problems, Tomio Kubo departed the Ki-73 project and worked on the twin engine Ki-83, which reached the complete prototype stage, but was not produced. The Mitsubishi Ki-73 was given the Allied code name Steve. The United States Army gave the plane a code name as captured documents made its development seen to be near completion.

== See also ==
Related development

- Mitsubishi Ki-83

Aircraft of comparable role, configuration, and era

- Lockheed P-38 Lightning
- North American P-51 Mustang
- Republic P-47 Thunderbolt
- Messerschmitt Bf 110
- Messerschmitt Bf 109

Related lists

- List of aircraft of World War II
