= Nakajima J5N Tenrai =

Japanese fighter prototype

J5N Tenrai
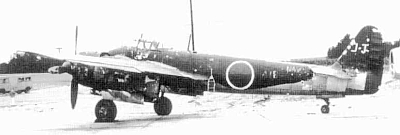
- Nakajima J5N1 Tenrai

General information
- Type: Interceptor
- Manufacturer: Nakajima Aircraft Company
- Designer: Katsuji Nakamura, Kazuo Ohno
- Primary user: Imperial Japanese Navy Air Service
- Number built: 6

History
- First flight: 13 July 1944

The Nakajima J5N Tenrai (天雷, heaven thunder) was an abandoned Japanese prototype fighter aircraft of the World War II era. J5N was developed as twin-engine interceptor for countering attacks by Boeing B-29 Superfortress.

== Design and development ==
During the spring of 1943, the JNAF issued an 18-Shi specification for a single-seat twin-engine interceptor capable of reaching a top speed of 666 km/h (414 mph) at 6,000 m (19,690 ft). Nakajima submitted a proposal based on the earlier J1N1 Gekko three-seat night fighter, although this new aircraft – designated J5N1 – was slightly smaller. The layout of the J5N was similar to the J1N: a low set wing on which were mounted the two powerplants, 1,484 kW (1,990 hp) Nakajima Homare 21 18-cylinder air-cooled radial engines, with a long fuselage ending in a conventional tail arrangement. For maximum utilization of the power from the twin engines, large four-blade propellers were fitted which also featured large spinners (as fitted to the J1N). The main wheels retracted rearwards into the engine nacelles, and the tailwheel was fixed. The cockpit was set above the wing, and featured a starboard-opening canopy. The nose was streamlined to offer the pilot an excellent forward view during landing, takeoff and taxiing.

Armament of the J5N consisted of two 30 mm and two 20 mm cannon, and provision was made for a centreline 250 kg (550 lb) bomb. The J5N was designed to combat the large, heavily armed and fast B-29 Superfortress, and so required such heavy armament in order to do severe damage in the brief windows of time allowed for firing passes. To concentrate the firepower, the four cannons were mounted in the nose of the J5N; if a single-engine fighter were unfortunate enough to find itself in front of a J5N, a single hit from a 30mm shell would have been more than adequate to destroy it.

== Operational history ==
Impressed with the design, the JNAF authorized the development of the J5N1, assigned the name Tenrai (天雷; "Heavenly Thunder"), and six prototypes were requested to be built. Progress was impeded by the failure of the engines to produce their promised power, and by a steady increase in the weight of the airframe as the need to reverse the long-standing policy of giving low priority to armor protection led to a buildup of weight and a drop in performance. The first prototype – lacking its armament – made its first flight July 13, 1944, and was something of a disappointment. The top speed attained was only 597 km/h (371 mph) – far below the specified 666 km/h (414 mph) of the requirement. Despite the other five prototypes also having flown with numerous enhancements, the aircraft never achieved its design speed, and the project was abandoned soon after in February 1945. Four of the six experimental aircraft were lost to accidents.

== Variants ==
- J5N1 : Single-seat interceptor fighter aircraft. Six built.

== Surviving aircraft ==
The rear fuselage, fin, a left wing panel and fuel cells of a J5N1 are in storage at the National Air and Space Museum.

== Specifications (J5N1) ==
Data from

General characteristics

- Crew: 1 (two aircraft completed as two-seaters)
- Length: 11.46 m (37 ft 7 in)
- Wingspan: 14.4 m (47 ft 3 in)
- Height: 2.38 m (7 ft 10 in)
- Gross weight: 7,300 kg (16,094 lb)
- Powerplant: 2 × Nakajima Homare 21 18-cyl. air-cooled radial piston engines, 1,480 kW (1,990 hp) each

Performance

- Maximum speed: 596 km/h (371 mph, 322 kn) achieved

(666.7 km/h (360 kn) at 6,000 m (19,685 ft) specification)

- Rate of climb: 15 m/s (3,000 ft/min)
- Wing loading: 230 kg/m^{2} (47 lb/sq ft)
- Power/mass: 0.40 kW/kg (0.24 hp/lb)

Armament

- Guns:
  - 2 × 30 mm Type 5 cannon

and/or

- 2 × 20 mm Type 99-2 cannon

- Bombs: 1 × 250 kg (551 lb) bomb

== See also ==
Aircraft of comparable role, configuration, and era

- de Havilland Hornet
- Grumman F7F Tigercat
- Kawasaki Ki-96
- Mitsubishi Ki-83
