= Type 12 two-seater reconnaissance seaplane =

Japanese reconnaissance floatplane project

E12

General information
- Type: Reconnaissance floatplane
- Manufacturer: Aichi Kokuki, Kawanishi Aircraft Company, Nakajima Aircraft Company
- Status: Project/prototype
- Primary user: Imperial Japanese Navy Air Service

History
- Manufactured: 4 (2 E12A & 2 E12K)
- Introduction date: never
- First flight: 1938 (E12A & E12K only)
- Variants: E12A, E12K, E12N

The Type 12 two-seater reconnaissance seaplane (十二試二座水上偵察機) was a reconnaissance floatplane planned by the Imperial Japanese Navy. Three manufacturers submitted projects to the contract competition: Aichi Kokuki, the Kawanishi Aircraft Company, and the Nakajima Aircraft Company. While Aichi and Nakajima proceeded to build prototypes, both designs were ultimately rejected. The planned designated model codes were respectively the Aichi E12A, Kawanishi E12K, and Nakajima E12N.

== Development ==
In June 1937, the Navy issued instructions to the three companies to develop a prototype to the "Type 12 two-seater reconnaissance seaplane" requirements, a ship-based catapult-launched reconnaissance seaplane intended to succeed the Type 95 reconnaissance seaplane. The performance requirements specified a maximum speed of 361 km/h (195 kn), a landing speed of 92.6 km/h (50.0 kn), a reconnaissance endurance of six hours (at full load), and the capability to perform dive-bombing attacks at a dive angle of 60 degrees.

=== E12A ===
Upon receiving a directive from the Navy to develop a prototype, Aichi began the design process in September 1937 under the leadership of chief engineer Kishiro Matsuo, with the internal project designation "AM-18." The design was finalized in February 1938, and two prototypes were completed by the end of that year. Compared to earlier Japanese reconnaissance seaplanes, the plane featured a modern all-metal monoplane design with twin floats and offered performance far superior to its predecessors. It was ultimately rejected due to excessive weight and poor handling and stability. Notably, the design of the later Aichi E13A drew upon the design of the E12A.

=== E12K ===
Kawanishi began the design process following a prototype order from the Navy and conducted wind tunnel tests using wooden models—including configurations for both single-float and twin-float monoplanes—but development was halted during the initial design phase due to considerations regarding other prototype projects. Consequently, the final configuration was never determined.

=== E12N ===
Following the prototype development order from the Navy, Nakajima carried out the design work between the summer of 1937 and early 1938 under the leadership of chief designer Shinroku Inoue, completing two prototypes by the end of 1938. The aircraft was an all-metal, twin-float monoplane similar to the E12A; however, by employing a proprietary structural analysis method for the main wing design, developed by engineer Naitō Shisei, the team succeeded in making the wing significantly lighter than those made using conventional methods. Although it demonstrated high performance, much like the E12A, it was ultimately rejected due to poor handling and stability, as well as excessive weight.
