= World War II Allied names for Japanese aircraft =

Identification chart of Japanese aircraft

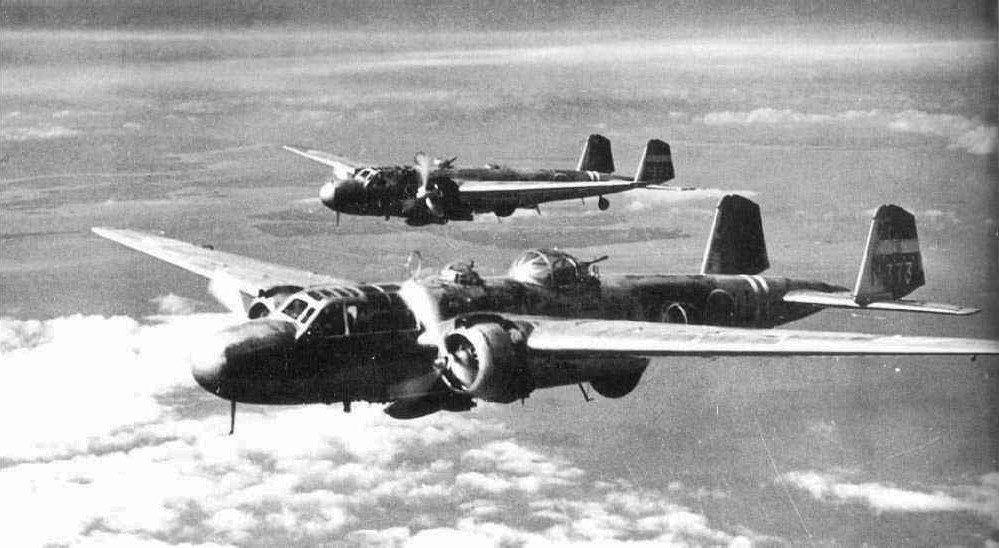
Mitsubishi G3M aircraft of the Imperial Japanese Navy were nicknamed "Nell" by Allied forces during World War II.

The World War II Allied names for Japanese aircraft were reporting names, often described as codenames, given by Allied personnel to Imperial Japanese aircraft during the Pacific campaign of World War II. The names were used by Allied personnel to identify aircraft operated by the Japanese for reporting and descriptive purposes. Generally, Western men's names were given to fighter aircraft and single engine reconnaissance aircraft, women's names to bombers, twin engine reconnaissance aircraft and transports, bird names to gliders, and tree names to trainer aircraft.

The use of the names, from their origin in mid-1942, became widespread among Allied forces from early 1943 until the end of the war in 1945. Many subsequent Western histories of the war have continued to use the names.

== History ==
During the first year of the Pacific War beginning on 7 December 1941, Allied personnel often struggled to quickly, succinctly, and accurately identify Japanese aircraft encountered in combat. They found the Japanese designation system bewildering and awkward, as it allocated two names to each aircraft. One was the manufacturer's alphanumeric project code, and the other was the official military designation, which consisted of a description of the aircraft plus the year it entered service. For example, the military designation of the Mitsubishi A5M fighter was the "Navy Type 96 Carrier Fighter". Type 96 meant that the aircraft had entered service in Imperial year 2596, equivalent to Gregorian calendar year 1936. Other aircraft, however, which had entered service the same year carried the same type number; aircraft such as the Type 96 Carrier Bomber and the Type 96 Land Attack Bomber. Adding to the confusion, the US Army and US Navy each had their own different systems for identifying Japanese aircraft.

In mid-1942, Captain Frank T. McCoy, a United States Army Air Forces military intelligence officer from the 38th Bombardment Group assigned to the Allied Technical Air Intelligence Unit in Australia, set out to devise a simpler method for identifying Japanese aircraft. Together with Technical Sergeant Francis M. Williams and Corporal Joseph Grattan, McCoy divided the Japanese aircraft into two categories; fighters and everything else. He gave boys' names to the fighters, and girls' names to the others. Later, training aircraft were named after trees, single engine reconnaissance aircraft were given men's names and multi-engine aircraft of the same type were given women's names. Transports were given girls' names that all began with the letter "T". Gliders were given the names of birds.

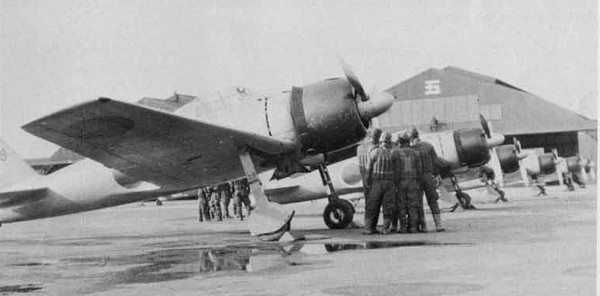
A6M3-32 "Hamp" fighters

McCoy's system quickly caught on and spread to other US and Allied units throughout the Pacific theater. By the end of 1942, all American forces in the Pacific and east Asia had begun using McCoy's system, and British Commonwealth nations adopted the system shortly thereafter. The list eventually included 122 names and was used until the end of World War II. To this day, many Western historical accounts of the Pacific War still use McCoy's system to identify Japanese aircraft.

In an effort to make the names sound somewhat comical, McCoy gave many of the aircraft 'hillbilly' names, such as "Zeke" and "Rufe," that he had encountered while growing up in Tennessee. Others were given names of people the creators of the system knew personally; the Mitsubishi G4M bomber, with its large gun blisters was named "Betty" in homage to a busty female friend of Williams. The Aichi D3A "Val" got its name from an Australian Army sergeant.

Not all of McCoy's chosen names caught on. Many Allied personnel continued calling the Mitsubishi Navy Type 0 Carrier Fighter "Zero" instead of McCoy's name of "Zeke." Also, McCoy's name for an upgraded version of the Zero, "Hap," in tribute to US Army general Henry H. Arnold, had to be changed to "Hamp" when it was learned that Arnold disapproved.

== List of names ==
Allied reporting name	Aircraft	Type designation	Notes
Abdul	Nakajima Ki-27	Army Type 97 Fighter	see "Nate"
Abdul	Mitsubishi	Navy Type 97 Fighter	Fictional type. (Note: Not a real aircraft. The aircraft was believed in service but never built, misidentified, or not used.)
Adam	Nakajima SKT-97	Navy Type 97 Seaplane Fighter	Fictional type.
Alf	Kawanishi E7K	Navy Type 94 Reconnaissance Seaplane	
Ann	Mitsubishi Ki-30	Army Type 97 Light Bomber	
Babs	Mitsubishi C5M	Navy Type 98 Reconnaissance Aircraft	
Babs	Mitsubishi Ki-15	Army Type 97 Command Reconnaissance Aircraft	See "Norma" (Note: The Ki-15 and C5M were the Army and Navy designations respectively for the same aircraft.)
Baka	Yokosuka MXY7	Navy Suicide Attacker Ohka	Name is Japanese in origin, meaning fool.
Belle	Kawanishi H3K	Navy Type 90-2 Flying Boat	
Ben	Nagoya-Sento KI-001	Army(?) Type 1 Fighter	Fictional type.
Bess	Heinkel He 111	Army Type 98 Medium Bomber	
Betty	Mitsubishi G4M	Navy Type 1 Land-based Attack Aircraft	
Bob	Nakajima E2N	Navy Type 15 Reconnaissance Floatplane	"Aichi Type 97"
Buzzard	Kokusai Ki-105 Otori	Army Transport	
Cedar	Tachikawa Ki-17	Army Type 95-3 Basic Grade Trainer	
Cherry	Yokosuka H5Y	Navy Type 99 Flying Boat	
Clara	Tachikawa Ki-70	Army Reconnaissance	
Claude	Mitsubishi A5M	Navy Type 96 Carrier Based Fighter	
Clint	Nakajima Ki-27	Army Type 97 Fighter	
Cypress	Kokusai Ki-86	Army Type 4 Primary Trainer	
Cypress	Kyushu K9W	Navy Type 2 Primary Trainer	
Dave	Nakajima E8N	Navy Type 95 Reconnaissance Seaplane	
Dick	Seversky A8V	Navy Type S Two Seat Fighter	
Dinah	Mitsubishi Ki-46	Army Type 100 Command Reconnaissance Aircraft	
Doc	Messerschmitt Bf 110	Unknown	
Doris	Unknown	Unknown	
Edna	Mansyu Ki-71	Army Type 99 Assault aircraft	
Emily	Kawanishi H8K	Navy Type 2 Large Flying Boat	
Eva/Eve	Mitsubishi Ohtori	n/a	civil record aircraft misreported as operated by the IJNAS
Fran	Yokosuka P1Y	Navy Land-based Bomber	
Frances	Yokosuka P1Y	Navy Land-based Bomber	
Frank	Nakajima Ki-84	Army Type 4 Fighter	
Gander	Kokusai Ku-8	Army Type 4 Special Transport Glider	
George	Kawanishi N1K-J	Navy Interceptor Fighter	
Glen	Yokosuka E14Y	Navy Type 0 Small Reconnaissance Seaplane	
Goose	Kokusai Ku-8	Army Type 4 Special Transport Glider	
Grace	Aichi B7A	Navy Carrier Attack Bomber	
Gus	Nakajima AT-27	Fighter	Fictional type.
Gwen	Mitsubishi Ki-21-IIb	Army Type 0 Medium Bomber	
Hap	Mitsubishi A6M3	Navy Type 0 Carrier Fighter Model 32	
Hamp	Mitsubishi A6M3	Navy Type 0 Carrier Fighter Model 32	
Hank	Aichi E10A	Navy Type 96 Night Reconnaissance Seaplane	
Harry	Mitsubishi TK-4	Army Type 0 Single Seat Twin-engined Fighter	Fictional type.
Helen	Nakajima Ki-49	Army Type 100 Heavy Bomber	
Hickory	Tachikawa Ki-54	Army Type 1 Trainer	
Ida	Tachikawa Ki-36	Army Type 98 Direct Co-operation Aircraft	
Ida	Tachikawa Ki-55	Army Type 99 Advanced Trainer	
Ione	Aichi AI-104	Navy Type 98 Reconnaissance Seaplane	Fictional Type
Irene	Junkers Ju 87	Unknown	
Irving	Nakajima J1N	Navy Type 2 Land Reconnaissance Aircraft	
Jack	Mitsubishi J2M	Navy Interceptor Fighter	
Jake	Aichi E13A	Navy Type 0 Reconnaissance Seaplane	
Jane	Mitsubishi Ki-21	Army Type 97 Heavy Bomber	
Janice	Junkers Ju 88	Unknown	
Jean	Yokosuka B4Y	Navy Type 96 Carrier Attack Bomber	
Jerry	Heinkel A7He	Navy Type He Interceptor Fighter	
Jill	Nakajima B6N	Navy Carrier Attack Bomber	
Joyce	Nakajima Unknown	Army Type 1 Medium Bomber	
Judy	Yokosuka D4Y	Navy Type 2 Carrier Reconnaissance Aircraft	
Julia	Kawasaki Ki-48	Army Type 97 Heavy Bomber	Misidentified – same as Lily
Kate	Nakajima B5N	Navy Type 97-1 Carrier Attack Bomber	
Laura	Aichi E11A	Navy Type 98 Reconnaissance Seaplane	
Lily	Kawasaki Ki-48	Army Type 99 Twin-engined Light Bomber	
Liz	Nakajima G5N	Navy Experimental 13-Shi Attack Bomber	
Lorna	Kyushu Q1W	Navy Patrol Aircraft	
Louise	Mitsubishi Ki-2-II	Army Type 93-2 Twin-engined Light Bomber	
Luke	Mitsubishi J4M	Navy Experimental 17-Shi Interceptor	
Mary	Kawasaki Ki-32	Army Type 98 Single Engine Light Bomber	
Mabel	Mitsubishi B5M	Navy Type 97-2 Carrier Attack Bomber	
Mavis	Kawanishi H6K	Navy Type 97 Large Flying Boat	
Mike	Kawasaki Ki-61	Army Type 3 Fighter	Interim designation, also used for Bf 109
Millie	Vultee V-11GB	Type 98 Showa Light Bomber	
Myrt	Nakajima C6N	Navy Carrier Reconnaissance Aircraft	
Nate	Nakajima Ki-27	Army Type 97 Fighter	
Nell	Mitsubishi G3M	Navy Type 96 Attack Bomber	
Nick	Kawasaki Ki-45	Army Type 2 Two-seat Fighter	
Norm	Kawanishi E15K	Navy Type 2 High Speed Reconnaissance Seaplane	
Norma	Mitsubishi Ki-15	Army Type 97 Command Reconnaissance Aircraft	
Norma	Mitsubishi C5M	Navy Type 98 Reconnaissance Aircraft	
Oak	Kyushu K10W	Navy Type 2 Intermediate Trainer	
Omar	Suzukaze 20	Fighter	Fictional type.
Oscar	Nakajima Ki-43	Army Type 1 Fighter	
Pat	Tachikawa Ki-74	Army Fighter	Initially misidentified – same as Patsy
Patsy	Tachikawa Ki-74	Army Reconnaissance Bomber	
Paul	Aichi E16A	Navy Reconnaissance Seaplane	
Peggy	Mitsubishi Ki-67	Army Type 4 Heavy Bomber	
Perry	Kawasaki Ki-10	Army Type 95 Fighter	
Pete	Mitsubishi F1M	Navy Type 0 Observation Seaplane	
Pine	Mitsubishi K3M	Navy Type 90 Crew Trainer	
Randy	Kawasaki Ki-102	Army Type 4 Assault Aircraft	
Rex	Kawanishi N1K	Navy Fighter Seaplane	
Rita	Nakajima G8N	Navy Type 18 Land Based Attack Aircraft	
Rufe	Nakajima A6M2-N	Navy Type 2 Interceptor/Fighter-Bomber	
Ruth	Fiat BR.20	Army Type I Heavy Bomber	
Sally	Mitsubishi Ki-21	Army Type 97 Heavy Bomber	
Sam	Mitsubishi A7M	Navy Experimental Carrier Fighter	
Slim	Watanabe E9W	Navy Type 96 Small Reconnaissance Seaplane	
Sonia	Mitsubishi Ki-51	Army Type 99 Assault Aircraft	
Spruce	Tachikawa Ki-9	Army Type 95-1 Intermediate Trainer	
Stella	Kokusai Ki-76	Army Type 3 Command Liaison Aircraft	
Steve	Mitsubishi Ki-73	Escort fighter	Cancelled/abandoned
Susie	Aichi D1A	Navy Type 94/96 Carrier Bomber	
Tabby	Douglas DC-3/ Showa/Nakajima L2D	Navy Type 0 Transport	
Tess	Douglas DC-2	Navy Transport	
Thalia	Kawasaki Ki-56	Army Type 1 Freight Transport	
Thelma	Lockheed Model 14	Army Type LO Transport	
Theresa	Kokusai Ki-59	Army Type 1 Transport	
Thora	Nakajima Ki-34	Army Type 97 Transport	
Tina	Yokosuka L3Y	Navy Type 96 Transport	
Tojo	Nakajima Ki-44	Army Type 2 Single-seat Fighter	
Tony	Kawasaki Ki-61	Army Type 3 Fighter	
Topsy	Mitsubishi Ki-57	Army Type 100 Transport	
Topsy	Mitsubishi L4M	Navy Type 0 Transport	
Trixie	Junkers Ju 52	Unknown	
Val	Aichi D3A	Navy Type 99 Dive Bomber	
Willow	Yokosuka K5Y	Navy Type 93 Intermediate Trainer	
Zeke or Zero	Mitsubishi A6M	Navy Type 0 Carrier Fighter	

== See also ==
- List of Japanese aircraft in use during the Second Sino-Japanese War
- List of aircraft of Japan during World War II
- 'Type' designation in Japan
- Japanese military aircraft designation systems
- NATO reporting name – a similar system implemented in the Cold War for Soviet and Chinese aircraft
