= Mitsubishi G7M Taizan =

Proposed WWII Japanese Bomber

G7M Taizan

General information
- Type: Heavy bomber
- Manufacturer: Mitsubishi Aircraft Company
- Primary user: Imperial Japanese Navy Air Service (planned)

History
- Manufactured: 0

The Mitsubishi G7M Taizan (泰山, Great Mountain) was a proposed twin-engine long-range bomber designed for use by the Imperial Japanese Navy in 1941.

The G7M was cancelled at the wooden mockup phase without ever reaching the hardware phase.

== Specifications ==
Data from Japanese Secret Projects : Experimental Aircraft of the IJA and IJN 1939-1945., Plane-Encyclopedia: Mitsubishi G7M “Taizan”

General characteristics

- Crew: 7
- Length: 20 m (65 ft 7 in)
- Wingspan: 25 m (82 ft 0 in)
- Height: 6.09 m (20 ft 0 in)
- Empty weight: 10,600 kg (23,369 lb)
- Gross weight: 16,000 kg (35,274 lb)
- Fuel capacity: 4,497 L (1,188 US gal; 989 imp gal)
- Powerplant: 2 × Mitsubishi MK10A 18-cylinder air-cooled radial piston engines, 1,500 kW (2,000 hp) each for take-off

1,350 kW (1,810 hp) at 2,200 m (7,200 ft)
1,280 kW (1,720 hp) at 5,400 m (17,700 ft)

- Propellers: 4-bladed constant-speed propeller, 4.5 m (14 ft 9 in) diameter

Performance

- Maximum speed: 544 km/h (338 mph, 294 kn) at 5,000 m (16,000 ft)
- Range: 2,799 km (1,739 mi, 1,511 nmi)
- Combat range: 6,412 km (3,984 mi, 3,462 nmi)
- Ferry range: 7,400 km (4,600 mi, 4,000 nmi)
- Service ceiling: 5,000 m (16,000 ft)
- Time to altitude: 10,000 m (33,000 ft) in 10 minutes
- Power/mass: 5.4 kg/kW (8.8 lb/hp)

Armament

- Guns:

6x 13 mm (0.512 in) Type 2 machine guns
2x 20 mm (0.787 in) Type 99 Mark 2 machine gun (classified as machine guns by the IJN)

- Bombs: up to 800 kg (1,800 lb) of bombs

== See also ==
Aircraft of comparable role, configuration, and era

- Heinkel He 177
