= Tachikawa Ki-74 =

Japanese long-range reconnaissance bomber

Ki-74
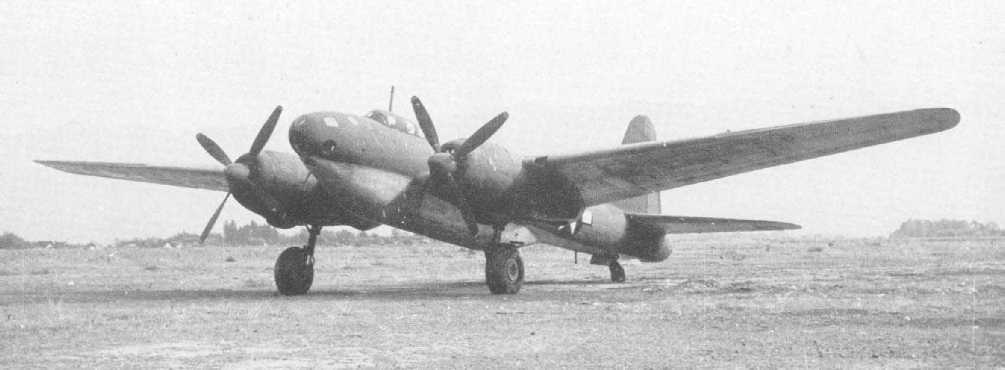

General information
- Type: Long-range reconnaissance bomber
- Manufacturer: Tachikawa Aircraft Company
- Primary user: Imperial Japanese Army Air Service
- Number built: 16

History
- First flight: March 1944

The Tachikawa Ki-74 (Allied reporting name Patsy) was a Japanese experimental, long-range reconnaissance bomber of World War II. A twin-engine, mid-wing monoplane, it was developed for the Imperial Japanese Army Air Service but never deployed in combat. The Ki-74 was designed for high altitude operation with a pressurized cabin for its crew.

== Development ==
Though already conceived in 1939 as a long-range reconnaissance aircraft capable of reaching west of Lake Baikal when operating from bases in Manchukuo (Manchuria), the initial prototype Ki-74 only first flew as late as March 1944, after its development and primary mission requirement had been changed to capability of bombing and reconnaissance over the mainland United States. The aircraft was powered by two 1,641 kW (2,201 hp) Mitsubishi Ha-211-I [Ha-43-I] radial engines. The subsequent two prototypes were powered by the turbo-supercharged Mitsubishi Ha-211-I Ru [Ha-43-II]; these experienced teething troubles, and the following thirteen pre-production machines substituted the Ha-211 Ru engine for the lower-powered but more reliable turbo-supercharged Mitsubishi Ha-104 Ru (Army Type 4 1,900 hp Air Cooled Radial). The aircraft was fitted with self-sealing fuel tanks, armor, and a pressurized cabin for its crew of five.

== Operational history ==
The Ki-74 did not progress beyond developmental testing and did not see operational service in combat. Nevertheless, the Allies knew of the type's existence and assigned the codename "Patsy" after it was discovered that it was a bomber, not a fighter (previously it had been assigned the codename "Pat" in Allied Intelligence).

== Specifications (Ki-74) ==
Data from The Imperial Japanese Secret Weapons Museum ; Japanese Aircraft of the Pacific War

General characteristics

- Crew: 5
- Capacity: 9,200 kg (20,300 lb)
- Length: 17.65 m (57 ft 11 in)
- Wingspan: 18.6 m (61 ft 0 in)
- Height: 5.1 m (16 ft 9 in)
- Wing area: 80 m^{2} (860 sq ft)
- Empty weight: 10,200 kg (22,487 lb)
- Gross weight: 19,400 kg (42,770 lb)
- Powerplant: 2 × Mitsubishi Ha104 Ru turbo-supercharged 18-cylinder air-cooled radial piston engines, 1,500 kW (2,000 hp) each

Performance

- Maximum speed: 570 km/h (350 mph, 310 kn)
- Cruise speed: 400 km/h (250 mph, 220 kn)
- Range: 8,000 km (5,000 mi, 4,300 nmi)
- Service ceiling: 12,000 m (39,000 ft)
- Wing loading: 242.5 kg/m^{2} (49.7 lb/sq ft)
- Power/mass: 0.154 kW/kg (0.093 hp/lb; 0.206 hp/kg)

Armament

- 1 x 12.7 mm (0.500 in) Ho-103 machine gun
- 1,000 kg (2,200 lb) bomb load

== See also ==
Aircraft of comparable role, configuration, and era

- de Havilland Mosquito
- Henschel Hs 130
- Junkers Ju 388
- North American XB-28 Dragon

== Bibliography ==
- Francillon, René J. (1979). Japanese Aircraft of the Pacific War. Putnam Aeronautical. ISBN 0-370-30251-6.
