= Kokusai Ku-7 =

Japanese experimental military glider

Ku-7 Manazuru Ki-105 Otori
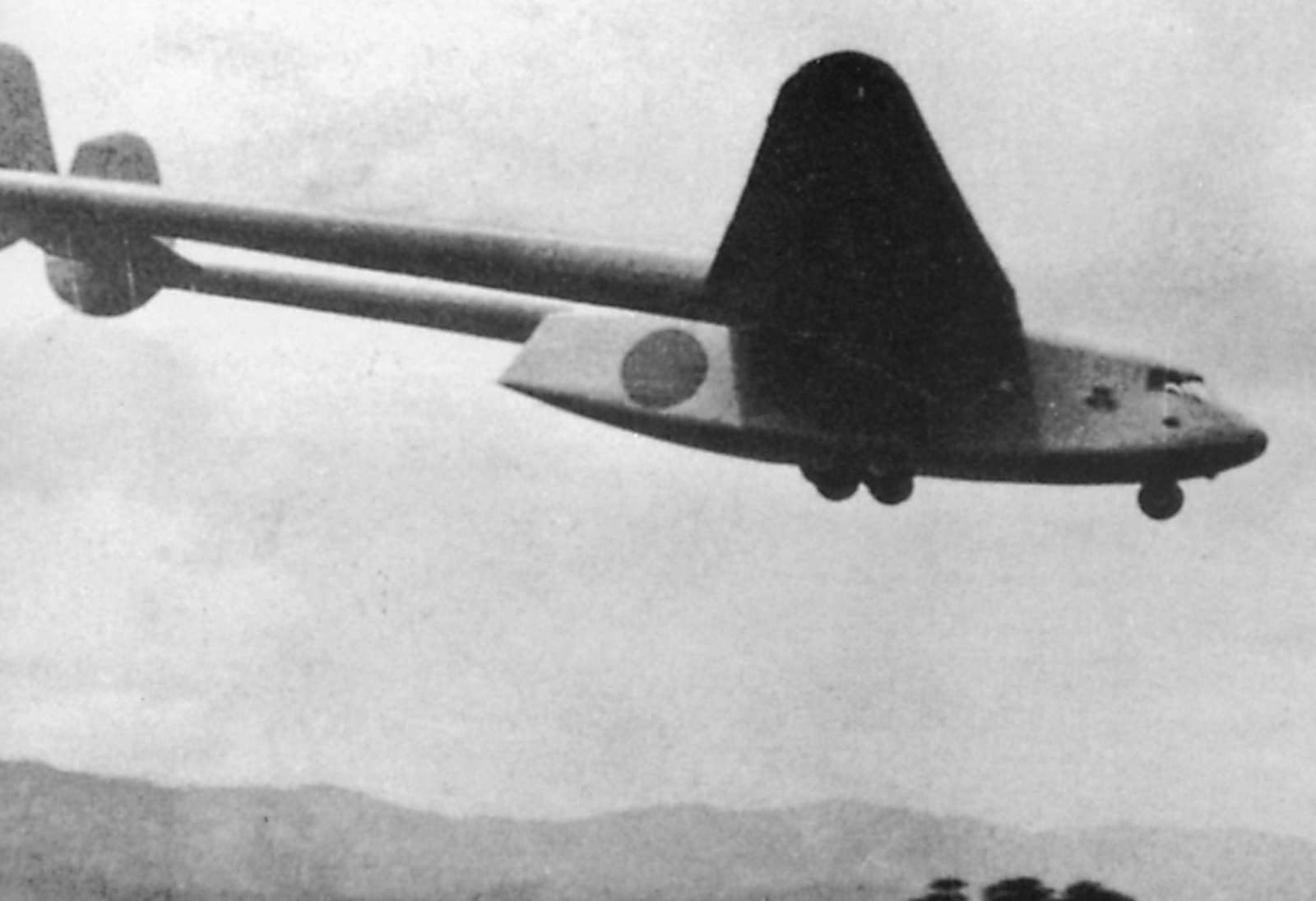

General information
- Type: Transport glider (Ku-7); Transport aircraft (Ki-105)
- National origin: Japan
- Manufacturer: Kokusai
- Number built: 2

History
- First flight: 1942
- Variants: Kokusai Ki-105

The Kokusai Ku-7 Manazuru (真鶴 "white-naped crane"; Allied code-name Buzzard) was a large, experimental twin boom Japanese military glider.

== Design and development ==
An enlarged version of the earlier Maeda Ku-1 glider, it was developed during 1942. The use of a twin boom design allowed for a large, square cargo door, which meant that the aircraft was capable of carrying either thirty-two soldiers, 7600 kg of cargo, or even a light tank. It required a powerful towing aircraft, either the Nakajima Ki-49 or the Mitsubishi Ki-67, which were in short supply. As a result, the aircraft were modified by fitting them with engines, which were designated the Ki-105 Ohtori (鳳 "Phoenix"). Intended for use as fuel transports, only nine, of 300 ordered, were produced before development priorities were shifted elsewhere.

== Variants ==
- Ku-7: Large experimental military transport glider.
- Ku-7-II: Original designation for the Ki-105.
- Kokusai Ki-105 Ohtori: Long-range fuel tanker aircraft, powered by 2x 940 hp (700 kW) Mitsubishi Ha26-II 14-cylinder radial engines; nine built. Maximum take-off weight:12,500 kg (27,600 lb); normal payload:3,300 kg (7,300 lb); cruising speed:220 km/h (140 mph; 120 kn); maximum range: 2,500 km (1,600 mi; 1,300 nmi).

== Specifications (Ku-7) ==
Data from Encyklopedia Uzbrojenia, Japanese Aircraft of the Pacific War

General characteristics

- Crew: 2
- Capacity: 32 troops, equipped / 8 short tons (7,300 kg) tank / 75 mm (3.0 in) howitzer with 4 short tons (3,600 kg) tractor / 7,464 kg (16,455 lb)
- Length: 19.5 m (64 ft 0 in)
- Wingspan: 34.75 m (114 ft 0 in)
- Wing area: 119.7 m^{2} (1,288 sq ft)
- Aspect ratio: 10.8
- Empty weight: 4,536 kg (10,000 lb)
- Gross weight: 12,000 kg (26,455 lb)

Performance

- Never exceed speed: 354 km/h (220 mph, 191 kn)
- Maximum towing speed: 201 km/h (125 mph; 109 kn)

== See also ==
Aircraft of comparable role, configuration, and era

- Gotha Go 242
