= Mitsubishi Ki-83 =

Japanese heavy fighter prototype in WWII

Ki-83
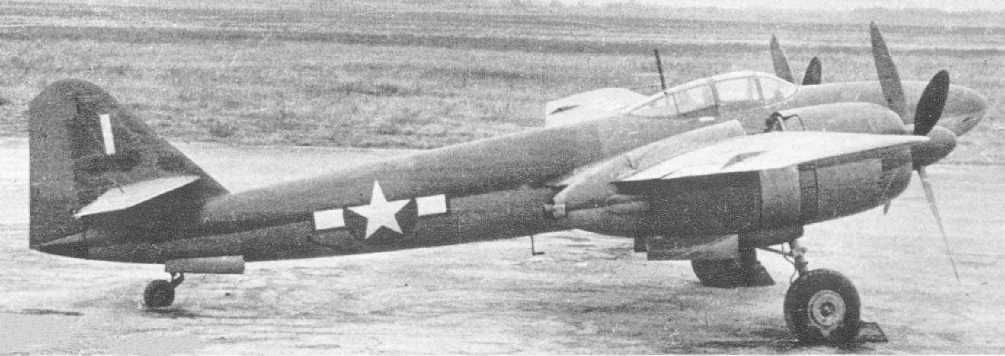
- A Ki-83 in American markings after the war.

General information
- Type: Long range heavy fighter
- Manufacturer: Mitsubishi
- Status: Prototype
- Number built: 4

History
- First flight: 18 November 1944

The Mitsubishi Ki-83 (キ83) was a Japanese experimental, long-range heavy fighter designed near the end of World War II that did not reach production status.

== Design and development ==
The Mitsubishi Ki-83 was designed as a long-range heavy fighter and built by a team, led by Tomio Kubo, designer of the highly successful Mitsubishi Ki-46. The design was a response to a 1943 specification for a new heavy fighter with great range. The first of four prototypes flew on 18 November 1944. The machines displayed remarkable maneuverability for aircraft of their size, being able to execute a 671 m (2,200 ft) diameter loop in just 31 seconds at a speed of over 644 km/h (400 mph). The Ki-83 carried a powerful armament of two 30 mm (1.18 in) and two 20 mm cannon in its nose.

Despite the bomb-ravaged Japanese manufacturing sector, plans for the Ki-83 to enter production were underway when Japan surrendered on 15 August 1945.

Both the existence and performance of the Ki-83 were little known during the War, even in Japan. It was completely unknown in Allied military aviation circles – as demonstrated by the fact that the Ki-83 had not been given a reporting name. Most early photographs of the type were taken during the post-war occupation of Japan, when the four prototypes were seized by the United States Army Air Forces and repainted with USAAF insignia. When they were evaluated by U.S. aeronautical engineers and other experts, a Ki-83, using high-octane fuel, reached a speed of 762 km/h (473 mph) at an altitude of 7,000 metres (23,000 ft).

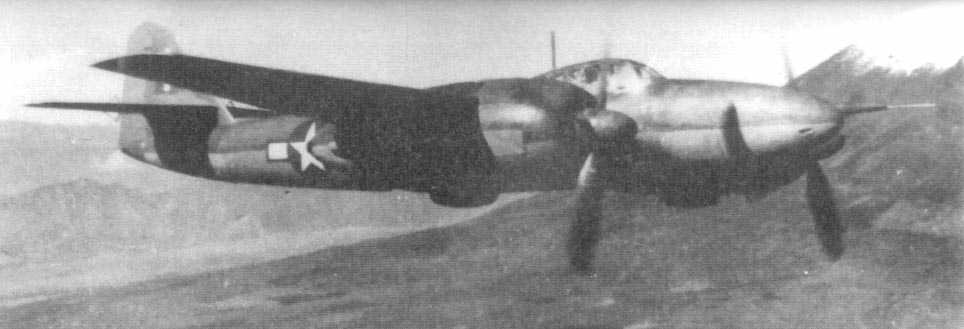
A Ki-83 during a postwar USAAF evaluation flight.

== Variants ==
- Ki-83 experimental long-range heavy fighter, four prototypes built.
- Ki-95 projected reconnaissance version, none built.
- Ki-103 projected development, none built.

== Specifications (Ki-83) ==
Data from Japanese Aircraft of the Pacific War

General characteristics

- Crew: 2
- Length: 12.5 m (41 ft 0 in)
- Wingspan: 15.5 m (50 ft 10 in)
- Height: 4.6 m (15 ft 1 in)
- Wing area: 33.5 m^{2} (361 sq ft)
- Empty weight: 5,980 kg (13,184 lb)
- Gross weight: 8,795 kg (19,390 lb)
- Max takeoff weight: 9,430 kg (20,790 lb)
- Powerplant: 2 × Mitsubishi Ha-43 Ru (Ha211) 18-cylinder air-cooled radial piston engines, 1,600 kW (2,200 hp) each for take-off

1,540 kW (2,070 hp) at 1,000 m (3,300 ft)
1,440 kW (1,930 hp) at 5,000 m (16,000 ft) and 6,400 m (21,000 ft)
1,280 kW (1,720 hp) at 9,500 m (31,200 ft)

- Propellers: 4-bladed constant-speed propellers

Performance

- Maximum speed: 704.5 km/h (437.8 mph, 380.4 kn) at 9,000 m (30,000 ft)

655 km/h (407 mph; 354 kn) at 5,000 m (16,000 ft)

- Cruise speed: 450 km/h (280 mph, 240 kn) at 4,000 m (13,000 ft)
- Range: 1,953 km (1,214 mi, 1,055 nmi)
- Ferry range: 3,500 km (2,200 mi, 1,900 nmi)
- Service ceiling: 12,660 m (41,540 ft)
- Time to altitude: 10,000 m (33,000 ft) in 10 minutes
- Wing loading: 263 kg/m^{2} (54 lb/sq ft)
- Power/mass: 0.35 kW/kg (0.21 hp/lb)

Armament

- Guns: 2× 30 mm Ho-155 cannon (60 rpg) and 2× 20 mm Ho-5 cannon (160 rpg) cannon mounted in the fuselage nose

== See also ==
- de Havilland Hornet
- Dornier Do 335
- Focke-Wulf Ta 154
- Grumman F7F Tigercat
- Junkers Ju 388
- Kawasaki Ki-96
- Lockheed XP-58 Chain Lightning
- McDonnell XP-67
- Savoia-Marchetti SM.92
- Messerschmitt Me 410
- Nakajima J5N
- North American F-82 Twin Mustang
- Northrop P-61 Black Widow
- Northrop F-15 Reporter
- Rikugun Ki-93
