= Mitsubishi Ka-8 =

Japanese carrier-based fighter prototype

Ka-8

General information
- Type: Fighter aircraft
- National origin: Japan
- Manufacturer: Mitsubishi Kokuki KK
- Status: Prototype

History
- Manufactured: 2
- First flight: 1934

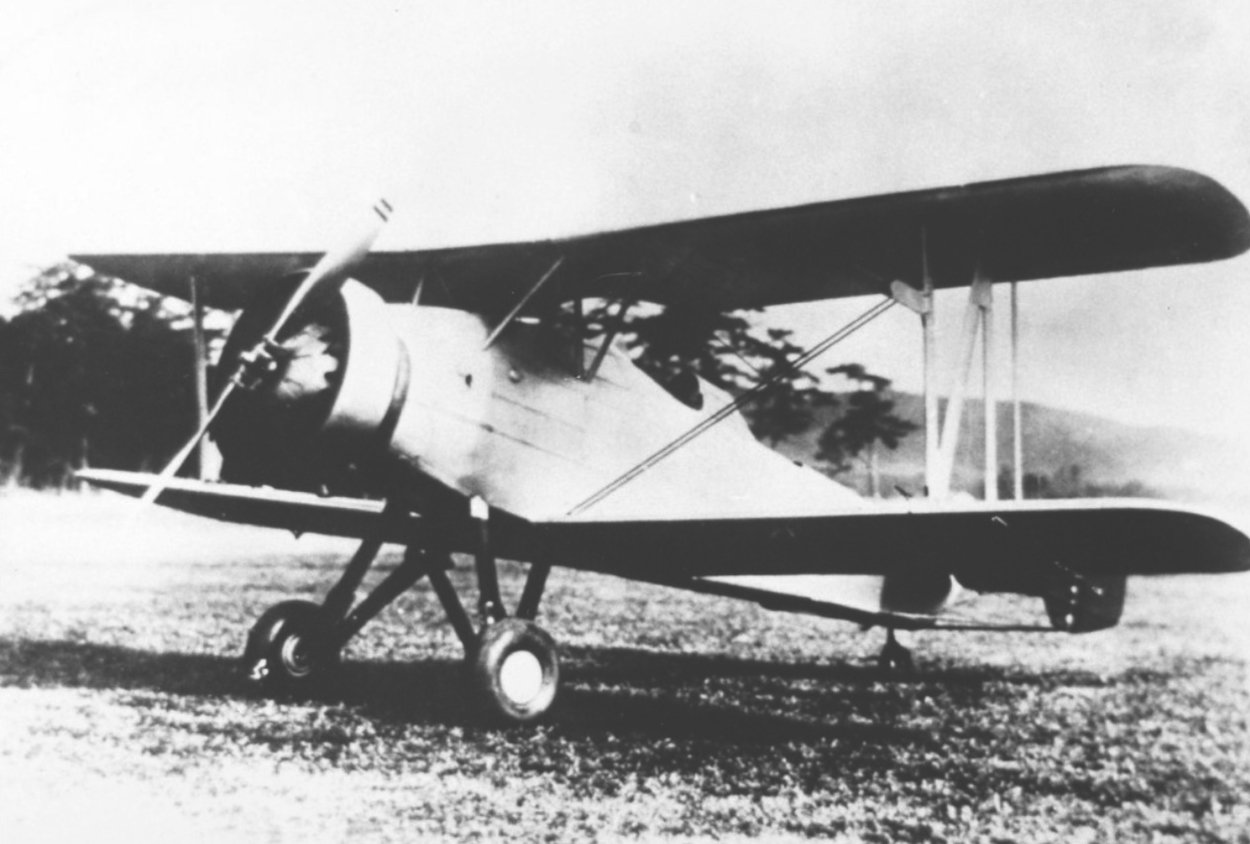
Imperial Japanese Navy 8-Shi experimental two-seat carrier fighter Mitsubishi Ka-8

The Mitsubishi Ka-8 or Mitsubishi Experimental 8-Shi Two-seat Fighter was a prototype Japanese two-seat carrier-based fighter aircraft of the 1930s. Two were built, but no production followed.

== Design and development ==
In the early 1930s, the Imperial Japanese Navy became interested in the concept of two-seat fighters, as popular with foreign air-arms, ordering a prototype of the Nakajima NAF-1 6-Shi two-seat fighter in 1931. Although the NAF-1 was unsuccessful, the Navy's interest in two-seat fighters continued, and in 1933, it requested new two-seat carrier-based fighter designs from Mitsubishi and Nakajima.

Mitsubishi's design, designated the Ka-8 by the company, and the Mitsubishi Experimental 8-Shi Two-seat Fighter by the Navy, (Note: In the Japanese Navy designation system, specifications were given a Shi number based on the year of the Emperor's reign it was issued. In this case 8-Shi stood for 1933, the 8th year of the Shōwa era.) was a single-engined biplane of mixed wood and metal construction. Its single-bay equal-span staggered wings had duralumin spars, with wooden ribs and fabric covering. The fuselage structure was made of welded steel tube with fabric covering, with pilot and gunner sitting in tandem in open cockpits. Two fixed forward-firing machine guns were operated by the pilot, with a single flexibly mounted machine gun in the rear cockpit. A twin tail was fitted, and the aircraft had a fixed tailwheel undercarriage. Powerplant was a single Nakajima Kotobuki, a licence-built Bristol Jupiter radial engine, driving a two-blade propeller.

The first of two prototypes was completed in January 1931, with both prototypes being delivered to the Navy for formal testing later in the year. The second prototype broke up during diving tests at Yokosuka on 16 September 1934. While the pilot escaped by parachute, the observer in the rear seat was killed. This accident caused testing of the surviving prototype to be abandoned, with the Nakajima contender, the NAF-2, also being rejected, with the Navy abandoning the two-seater carrier fighter category.

== Specifications ==
Data from Japanese Aircraft 1910–1941

General characteristics

- Crew: 2
- Length: 7.39 m (24 ft 3 in)
- Wingspan: 10.0 m (32 ft 10 in)
- Height: 3.35 m (11 ft 0 in)
- Wing area: 26 m^{2} (280 sq ft)
- Airfoil: NACA M-12
- Empty weight: 1,153 kg (2,542 lb)
- Gross weight: 1,700 kg (3,748 lb)
- Powerplant: 1 × Nakajima Kotobuki 2 nine-cylinder radial engine, 430 kW (580 hp)

Performance

- Maximum speed: 286 km/h (178 mph, 155 kn) at 3,000 m (9,800 ft)

Armament

- Guns:
  - 2× fixed forward firing 7.7 mm machine guns
  - 1× flexibly mounted 7.7 mm machine gun in rear cockpit
