= Mitsubishi Ki-2 =

1930s Japanese light bomber

Ki-2
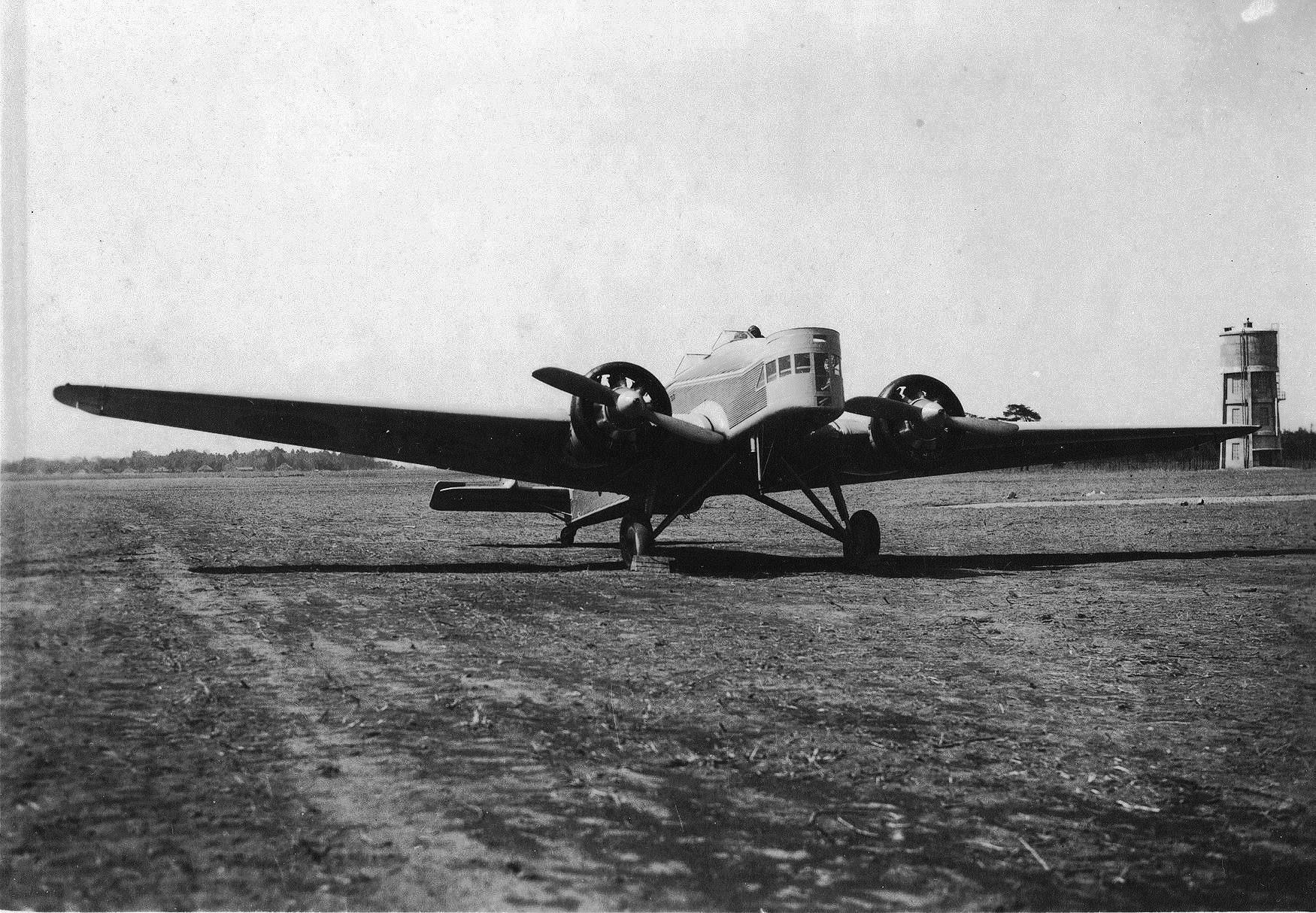
- Mitsubishi Ki-2-I (Army Type 93-I Twin-engine Light Bomber)

General information
- Type: Light bomber
- Manufacturer: Mitsubishi Heavy Industries
- Primary user: Imperial Japanese Army Air Service (IJAAS)
- Number built: 187

History
- Manufactured: 1933-1938
- First flight: May 1933

The Mitsubishi Ki-2 (九三式双軽爆撃機, Kyūsan-shiki sōkei bakugekiki; "Army Type 93 Twin-engine Light Bomber") was a light bomber built by Mitsubishi for the Imperial Japanese Army Air Service (IJAAS) in the 1930s. Its Allied nickname was "Louise". Despite its antiquated appearance, the Ki-2 was successfully used in Manchukuo and in North China during the early stages of the Second Sino-Japanese War in areas where danger from enemy fighter aircraft was minimal. It was later used in a training role.

== Design and development ==
The Ki-2 was a low-wing, cantilever monoplane with corrugated metal alloy decking, twin fins with rudders, fixed divided landing gear, and powered by two 435 hp (324 kW) Nakajima Kotobuki radial engines. Maximum speed was 225 km/h (140 mph), normal range 900 km (490 nmi; 560 mi), and maximum take-off weight 4,550 kg (10,030 lb). Single 7.7 mm (0.303 in) machine guns were mounted in a semi-enclosed nose and dorsal positions, and it could carry a maximum bomb load of 500 kg (1,100 lb).

The Ki-2 was, like its stable mate the Mitsubishi Ki-1, was an adaptation of the Junkers S36 that was first flown in 1927. Militarized into the Junkers K37 by Junker's Swedish subsidiary AB Flygindustri at Limhamn near Malmö in Sweden, it was able to reach altitudes unattainable by contemporary fighter aircraft. However, by 1930, this advantage had been lost due to developments such as the Bristol Bulldog fighter, and Junkers was unsuccessful in selling the design.

In 1931, representatives of the Mitsubishi Nainenki K.K. in Japan visited the Limhamn facilities to study some of the military conversions of Junkers aircraft, and they purchased the sole K37 prototype S-AABP (ex D-1252 S36-prototype) as well as all development papers, signing a contract for licensed production.

The K37 prototype was brought to Japan and tested in combat in the Manchurian Incident of 1931, following which the IJAAS authorized Mitsubishi to produce both heavy and light bomber variations. The Mitsubishi Ki-1 heavy bomber was a much larger new design following only the general arrangement of the K37, and it first flew in August 1932.

The Mitsubishi Ki-2 light bomber version, a minimally re-designed K37, flew for the first time in May 1933. The fuselage was redesigned by Mitsubishi, but the wings were kept largely unchanged, except for additional ailerons. Mitsubishi built total of 113 aircraft, and an additional 13 aircraft were built by Kawasaki Kōkūki Kōgyō KK from 1933 to 1936.

An upgraded version was produced in quantity as the Ki-2-II (Army Type 93-II Twin-engined Light Bomber) with nose turret and semi-retractable main landing gear and powered by two 559 hp (417 kW) Mitsubishi Ha-8 (Army Type 94 550hp Air Cooled Radial) engines.

== Operational history ==
Although already obsolescent by the time of its introduction, it was used with great success in the counterinsurgency operations of the Pacification of Manchukuo, and as well as limited use in the Second Sino-Japanese War in combat in North China.

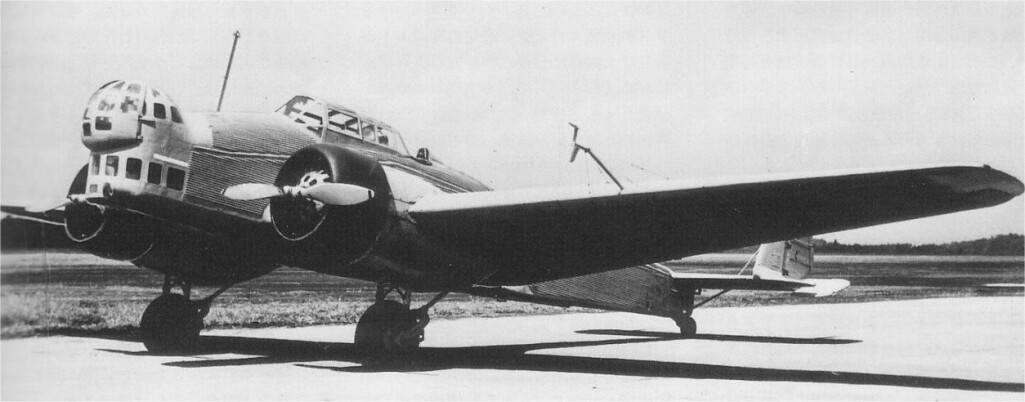
A Ki-2-II (Army Type 93-2 Light Bomber)

Vulnerable to attack by enemy fighters and replaced by aircraft with greater range and payload by the late 1930s, both versions ended their flying careers in the training role.

A civilian version of the Ki-2-II named Ohtori (Phoenix) was bought by the Asahi Shimbun newspaper and made a number of long-range record-breaking and "goodwill" flights from 1936-39. Registered J-BAAE, it covered the 4,930 km (2,660 nmi; 3,060 mi) from Tachikawa military air base to Bangkok in 21 hours 36 minutes flying time in December 1936, and, in early 1939, it achieved a round-China flight of some 9,300 km (5,000 nmi; 5,800 mi).

== Variants ==
Ki-2-I (Army Type 93-I Twin-engined Light Bomber)
Initial production variant, powered by two 435 hp (324 kW) Nakajima Kotobuki radial engines; 126 built.
Ki-2-II (Army Type 93-II Twin-engined Light Bomber)
Final production variant with nose turret and semi-retractable main landing gear, powered by two 559 hp (417 kW) Mitsubishi Ha-8 (Army Type 94 550hp Air Cooled Radial) engines; 61 built.
Mitsubishi Ohtori (大鳥, Ōtori; "phoenix", lit. "large bird")
A de-militarized long-range record-breaking aircraft operated by Asahi Shimbun; 1 built. Was mistakenly given the Allied reporting name of Eva or Eve.

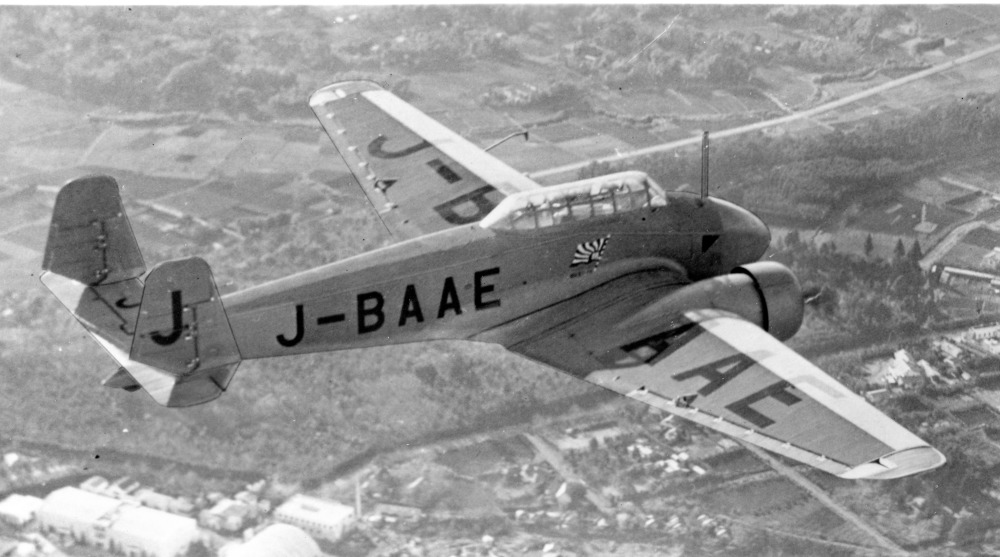
Mitsubishi Ohtori

== Operators ==
Japan

- Imperial Japanese Army Air Service
- Asahi Shimbun

== Specifications (Ki-2-I) ==
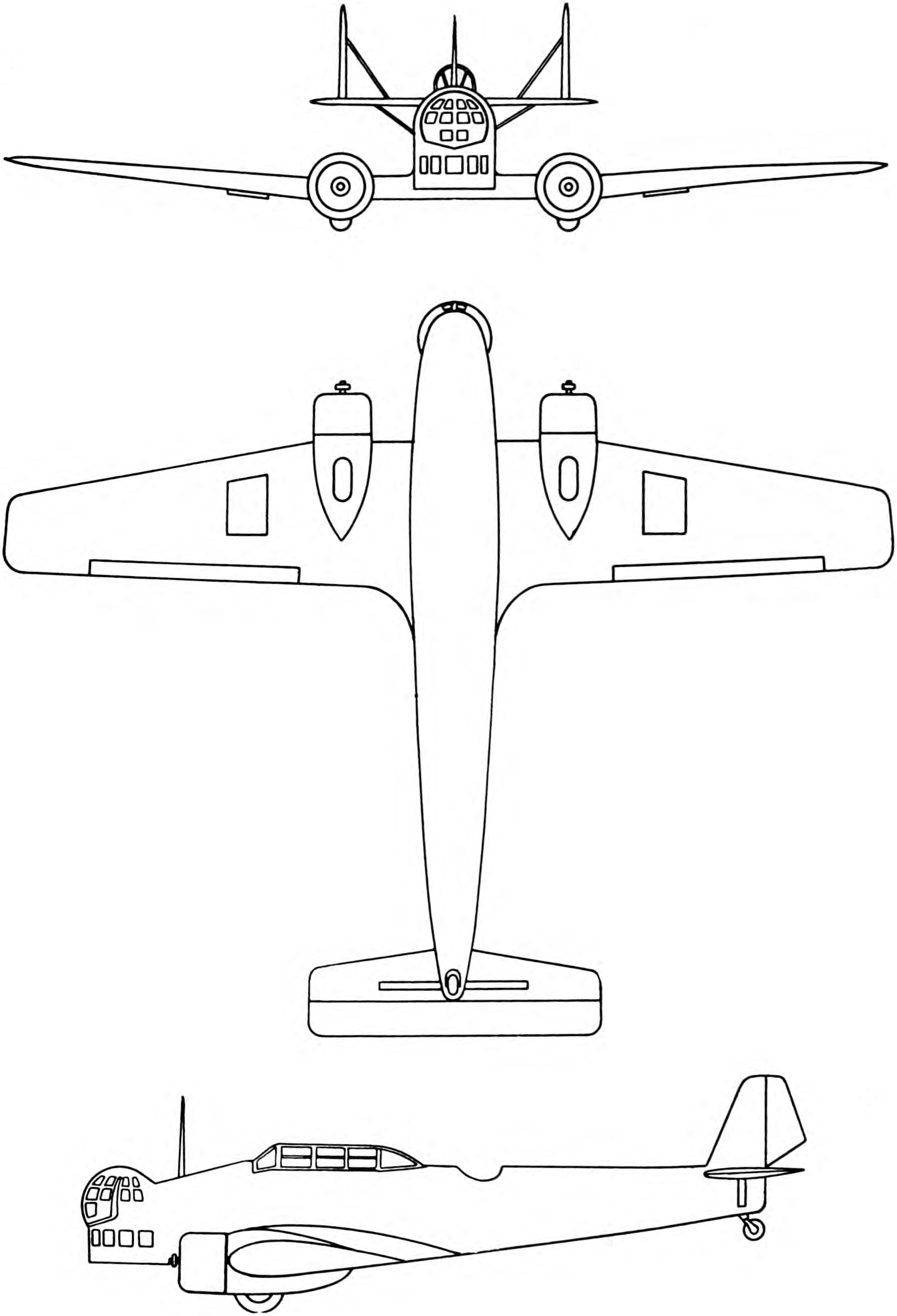
3-view drawing of the Mitsubishi Ki-2-II

Data from Japanese Aircraft, 1910-1941

General characteristics

- Crew: 3
- Length: 12.6 m (41 ft 4 in)
- Wingspan: 19.9 m (65 ft 3 in)
- Height: 4.6 m (15 ft 1 in)
- Wing area: 56 m^{2} (600 sq ft)
- Empty weight: 2,800 kg (6,173 lb)
- Gross weight: 4,500 kg (9,921 lb)
- Powerplant: 2 × Nakajima Kotobuki 9-cylinder air-cooled radial engines, 324 kW (435 hp) each
- Propellers: 2-bladed wooden fixed pitch propeller

Performance

- Maximum speed: 225 km/h (140 mph, 121 kn)
- Range: 900 km (560 mi, 490 nmi)
- Service ceiling: 7,000 m (23,000 ft)

Armament

- Guns: 2× to 3× 7.7 mm (0.303 in) machine guns: single or twin machine guns in the nose turret, one in the dorsal turret
- Bombs: 300 kg (660 lb) (small run) or 500 kg (1,100 lb)(heavy run) of bombs

== See also ==
Related lists

- List of military aircraft of Japan

== Bibliography ==
- The Illustrated Encyclopedia of Aircraft (Part Work 1982-1985). Orbis Publishing. p. 2520.
- Francillon, Ph.D., René J. (1979). Japanese Aircraft of the Pacific War. London: Putnam & Company Ltd. ISBN 0-370-30251-6.
- Lake, Jon (2002). Great Book of Bombers. pp86: Zenith Press. ISBN 0-7603-1347-4.
- Mikesh, Robert C.; Abe, Shorzoe (1990). Japanese Aircraft, 1910-1941. Annapolis, MD: Naval Institute Press. ISBN 1-55750-563-2.
- Passingham, Malcolm (March 1999). "Les bombardiers de l'Armée japonaise (1920–1935) 2ème partie et fin" [Japanese Army Bombers (1920–1935)]. Avions: Toute l'aéronautique et son histoire (in French) (72): 29–36. ISSN 1243-8650.
- Taylor, Michael J. H. (1989). Jane's Encyclopedia of Aviation. London: Studio Editions.
