= Mitsubishi B5M =

Japanese attack aircraft

B5M
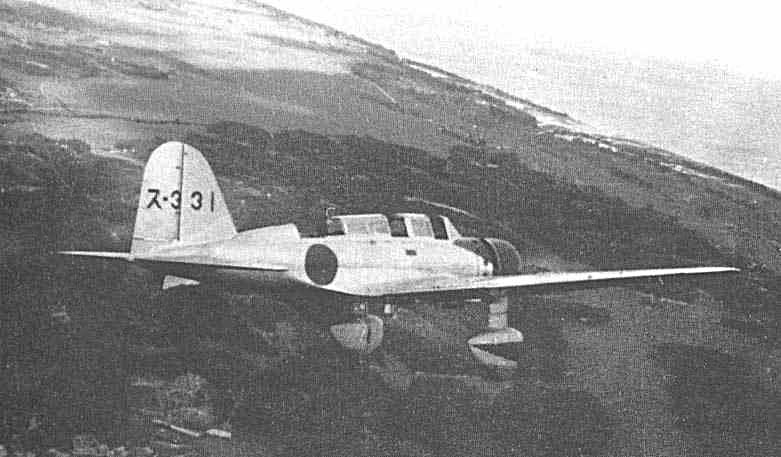

General information
- Type: Attack aircraft
- Manufacturer: Mitsubishi
- Primary user: Imperial Japanese Navy Air Service (IJNAS)
- Number built: 125

History
- Introduction date: 1937
- First flight: 1937

The Mitsubishi B5M was an Imperial Japanese Navy Air Service (IJNAS) land-based attack aircraft, originally intended for aircraft carrier use. The B5M was also given the long formal designation Navy Type 97 Mk.2 Carrier Attack Bomber (Japanese: 九七式二号艦上攻撃機) and Allied reporting name of Mabel. This aircraft was mistakenly known as the Nakajima Army 97 by the British.

The B5M was designed in response to a 1935 specification for a new bomber for use on the IJNAS aircraft carriers (Mitsubishi Navy Experimental 10-Shi Carrier Torpedo Attacker). The machine was to have a crew of three, folding wings for flight deck storage, a speed of not less than 322 km/h (200 mph), a flight endurance of not less than seven hours, and the ability to carry at least 800 kg (1,760 lb) of bombs - a tall order for a single-engine aircraft of the mid-1930s. It was intended as a backup for the Nakajima B5N "Kate" torpedo bomber. Although designed as a carrier-based aircraft, it was relegated to land-based torpedo bomber duties in World War II. One-hundred twenty-five were built.

== Operational history ==
The aircraft that Mitsubishi produced first flew in 1937 and was an all-metal, low-wing cantilever monoplane with fixed undercarriage and large wheel spats. The crew of three sat in a long canopy that had a smooth transition to the fuselage. The B5M1s began equipping Japanese Naval units in late 1937, but their performance was never as satisfactory as other Japanese aircraft carrier-based bombers. The B5M1's performance was considered marginal, and only one-hundred twenty-five were manufactured. While they had originally been intended for aircraft carrier use, the majority were employed during the early months of World War II from land bases in Southeast Asia and China, where they were confronted by weak or no enemy fighter opposition. These machines ended their careers as trainers, target tugs, and kamikazes.

== Variants ==
- B5M1:Three-seat attack aircraft for the Imperial Japanese Navy.

== Operators ==
Japan

- Imperial Japanese Navy

== Specifications (Mitsubishi B5M1) ==
Data from Air World extra volume, "Photo collection of Japanese Navy Aircraft in the World War II, revised edition" (エアワールド 1987年別冊 World War II 日本海軍機写真集 改訂増補版), Air World INC., 1987, pp.218-219.

General characteristics

- Crew: 3
- Length: 10.324 m (33 ft 10 in)
- Wingspan: 15.3 m (50 ft 2 in)
- Height: 4.24 m (13 ft 11 in)
- Wing area: 39.64 m^{2} (426.7 sq ft)
- Max takeoff weight: 4,000 kg (8,818 lb)
- Powerplant: 1 × Mitsubishi MK8 Kinsei 43 14-cylinder air-cooled twin-row radial piston engine, 750 kW (1,000 hp)
- Propellers: 3-bladed variable-pitch propeller

Performance

- Maximum speed: 381 km/h (237 mph, 206 kn) at 2,200 m (7,200 ft)
- Range: 2,322 km (1,443 mi, 1,254 nmi)
- Service ceiling: 8,260 m (27,100 ft)

Armament

- Guns: 1 × 7.7 mm (0.303 in) Type 92 machine gun in flexible mount in rear cockpit
- Bombs: up to 800 kg (1,760 lb) of bombs or one 800 kg (1,760 lb) torpedo carried externally

== See also ==
Aircraft of comparable role, configuration, and era

- Nakajima B5N

Related lists

- List of military aircraft of Japan
