= Mitsubishi K7M =

Japanese trainer aircraft prototype

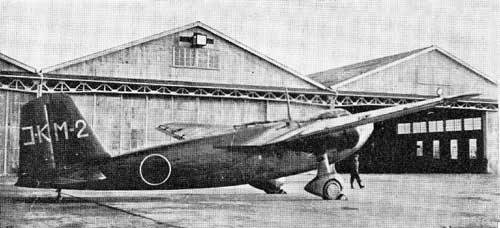

General information
- Type: Experimental crew trainer
- National origin: Japan
- Manufacturer: Mitsubishi
- Primary user: Imperial Japanese Navy
- Number built: 2

History
- First flight: 1938

The Mitsubishi K7M (or Mitsubishi Ka-18) was a 1930s Japanese experimental crew trainer built by Mitsubishi for the Imperial Japanese Navy to replace the K3M.

== Design and development ==
The K7M was a cantilever high-wing monoplane with a cabin for five students and two instructors, and was of metal construction, with fabric-covered outer wings. The K7M was powered by two 340 hp (254 kW) Gasuden Tempu radial piston engines. The Navy decided the twin-engined type was too costly to replace the single-engined K3M and the type was not developed further, the two prototypes did enter service as trainers with the designation K7M1.

== Operators ==
Japan

- Imperial Japanese Navy Air Service

== Specifications ==
Data from

General characteristics

- Crew: 2
- Capacity: 5 students, 2 instructors.
- Length: 13.23 m (43 ft 5 in)
- Wingspan: 19.96 m (65 ft 6 in)
- Height: 3.45 m (11 ft 4 in)
- Empty weight: 2,558 kg (5,640 lb)
- Gross weight: 3,810 kg (8,400 lb)
- Powerplant: 2 × Gasuden Tempu radial piston engine, 250 kW (340 hp) each

Performance

- Maximum speed: 260 km/h (160 mph, 140 kn)
- Cruise speed: 180 km/h (110 mph, 97 kn)
- Range: 950 km (590 mi, 510 nmi)
- Service ceiling: 5,800 m (19,000 ft)

Armament

- Guns: 2 × 7.7mm (0.303in) machine-gun
- Bombs: up to 90kg (198lb)

== See also ==
Related lists

- List of military aircraft of Japan
