= Mitsubishi K3M =

Japanese trainer aircraft

K3M
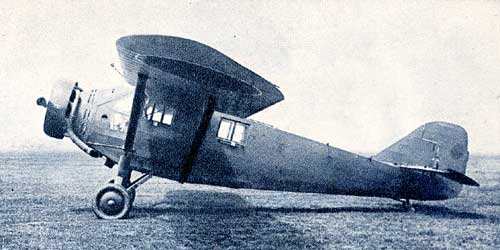

General information
- Type: training aircraft
- Manufacturer: Mitsubishi
- Primary user: Imperial Japanese Navy Air Service
- Number built: 625

History
- Introduction date: 1931
- First flight: 1930

The Mitsubishi K3M (九〇式機上作業練習機, Kyūrei-shiki kijō sagyō renshūki) was a trainer built by Mitsubishi which was used by the Imperial Japanese Navy in an extremely wide variety of roles, including light transport, liaison aircraft, utility aircraft, and occasionally light bomber. Its Allied reporting name was Pine.

== Design & Development ==
The Mitsubishi K3M was designed by British aeronautical engineer and aircraft designer Herbert Smith from Sopwith working in Japan for Mitsubishi. The prototype, designated Mitsubishi 4MS1, made its maiden flight in 1930. The aircraft was strut-braced, high-wing cabin monoplane with fixed wide-track landing gear, and it was powered by a single 300 hp (220 kW) water-cooled radial piston engine. Pilot and gunner were located in separate open cockpits, with an instructor and two pupils in the enclosed cabin in the fuselage. Later passenger variants seated five passengers in the cabin.

Total production of all versions was around 625 aircraft, with production mostly undertaken by Kyushu Hikoki K.K. and Aichi Kokuki. Production continued until 1941, and examples pressed into service as liaison aircraft in the postwar period were found in a variety of national markings.

== Operational history ==
The first version of the K3M offered to the Imperial Japanese Navy Air Service was prone to stability problems, and more importantly, problems with the water-cooled 340 hp (250 kW) Mitsubishi-built Hispano-Suiza 8A eight-cylinder liquid-cooled engine.

The improved K3M2 used a Hitachi Amakaze 11 nine-cylinder air-cooled radial engine, rated at 340 hp (250 kW) for take-off and 300 hp (220 kW) at sea level. The first K3M2 production examples entered service in 1932 as the Navy Type 90 Crew Trainer. It was superseded in production with the K3M3, using a Nakajima Kotobuki 460 hp (340 kW) air-cooled engine.

The Navy Type 90 Crew Trainer was primarily a land-based aircraft, although a few were fitted with floats.

The Imperial Japanese Army Air Force (IJAAF) had an interest in the aircraft as part of its modernization program and as a potential supplement to the Nakajima Ki-6. Two examples were acquired and tested, and the airframe was given the designation of Ki-7. One prototype used a 475 hp (354 kW) Mitsubishi Type 92 nine-cylinder air-cooled radial engine and the other a 450 hp (340 kW) Nakajima Kotobuki nine-cylinder air-cooled radial engine. The IJAAF did not order either version into production.

The civil version was offered to commercial operators with a 420 hp (310 kW) Nakajima-built Bristol Jupiter VI nine-cylinder air-cooled radial engine. The Mitsubishi K3M was used for both civil and military roles, and some remained in operation until well after World War II.

== Variants ==
Mitsubishi K3M1
Initial version
Mitsubishi K3M2 (Japanese Navy Type 90 Crew Training Aircraft)
Initial production version for Imperial Japanese Navy
Mitsubishi K3M3 (Japanese Navy Type 90 Crew Training Aircraft)
Final production version for Imperial Japanese Navy
Mitsubishi K3M3-L
Military transport used by Imperial Japanese Navy
Ki-7
Version for Imperial Japanese Army, 2 built
Mitsubishi MS-1
Civil transport version

== Operators ==
=== Military operators ===
Japan

- Imperial Japanese Navy Air Service

== Specifications (K3M3) ==
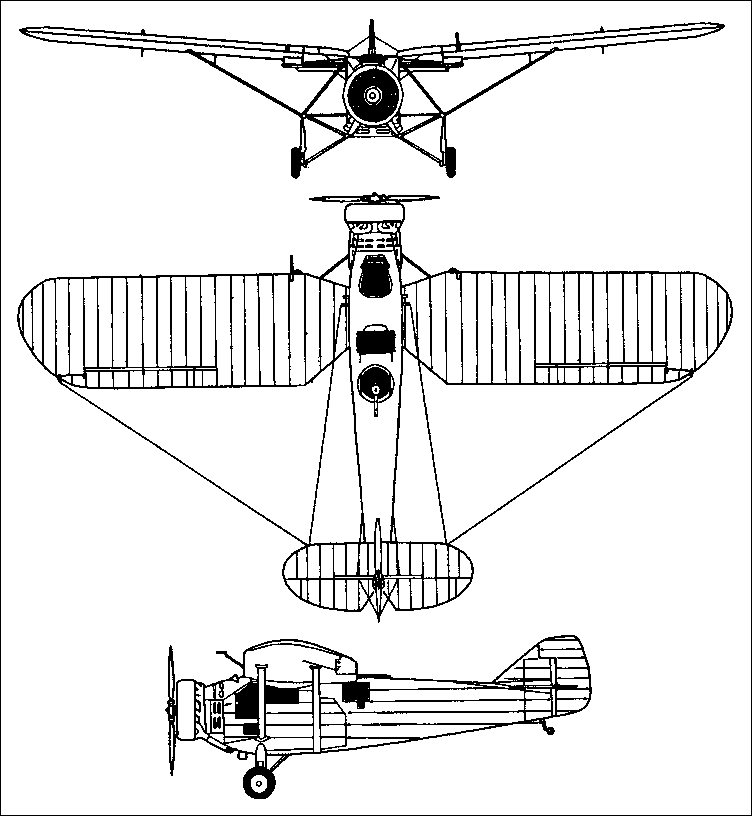
Mitsubishi K3M

General characteristics

- Crew: 4
- Capacity: 6
- Length: 9.54 m (31 ft 4 in)
- Wingspan: 15.78 m (51 ft 9 in)
- Height: 3.82 m (12 ft 6 in)
- Wing area: 34.5 m^{2} (371.35 sq ft)
- Empty weight: 1,360 kg (2,998 lb)
- Gross weight: 2,200 kg (4,850 lb)
- Powerplant: 1 × Nakajima Kotobuki-2 , 435 kW (580 hp)

Performance

- Maximum speed: 230 km/h (143 mph, 124 kn)
- Range: 790 km (491 mi, 427 nmi)
- Service ceiling: 6,389 m (20,950 ft)
- Rate of climb: 8.77 m/s (1,726 ft/min)

Armament

- 1 × 7.7 mm Type 92 machine gun, rear-mounted
- 4 × 30 kg (66 lb) bombs
