= Mitsubishi Ki-1 =

Bomber built for the Imperial Japanese Army

Ki-1
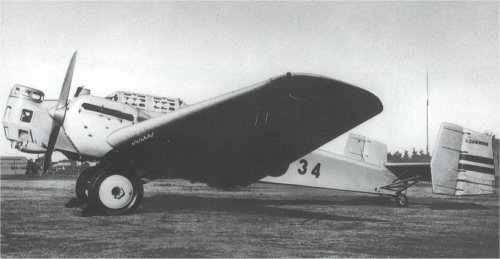
- Mitsubishi Ki-1 (Army Type 93 heavy Bomber)

General information
- Type: bomber
- Manufacturer: Mitsubishi Heavy Industries
- Primary user: Imperial Japanese Army Air Service
- Number built: 118

History
- Introduction date: 1933
- First flight: August 1932

The Mitsubishi Ki-1, also known as Mitsubishi Army Type 93 Heavy Bomber, was a bomber built by Mitsubishi for the Imperial Japanese Army in the 1930s. The Ki-1 design was heavily based on the Junkers K 37, and the prototype flew in the early 1930s.

Despite its antiquated appearance, the Ki-1 was used in Manchukuo and in North China during the early stages of the Second Sino-Japanese War in areas where danger from enemy fighter aircraft was minimal.

== Design and development ==
The Mitsubishi Ki-1 was a low-wing, cantilever monoplane with fixed landing gear, twin fins and rudders, and it was powered by two 701 hp (523 kW) Mitsubishi Ha2-II water-cooled V-12 engines, giving a maximum speed of 220 km/h (136.7 mph). The pilot and co-pilot were seated in tandem under an enclosed canopy, while gunners sat in semi-enclosed nose and dorsal gun turrets, each armed with a single 7.7 mm (0.303 in) machine gun. The usable bomb load was up to 1,500 kg (3,306.9 lb).

The Ki-1 shared a similar configuration with the Junkers S 36 that was first flown in 1927 and militarized into the Junkers K37 by Junker's Swedish subsidiary AB Flygindustri at Limhamn near Malmö. It was able to reach altitudes not reachable for the fighters of 1927. However, as soon as 1930, this advantage was lost due to British developments such as the Bristol Bulldog fighter, and Junkers was not successful in selling the design. In 1931, representatives of Mitsubishi from Japan visited the Limhamn facilities to study some of the military conversions of Junkers aircraft. The sole K 37 prototype S-AABP (ex D-1252 - S 36-prototype), as well as all development papers, were purchased in part by funds raised by donations in Japan. The aircraft got the name Aikoku No.1 (patriotic gift).

The K37 prototype was brought to Japan and tested in combat during the Manchurian Incident of 1931, following which the Imperial Japanese Army Air Force authorized Mitsubishi to produce both heavy and light bomber variations. The heavy bomber Ki-1 was much larger than the original Junkers K37, and it first flew in August 1932. A total of 118 aircraft were built in two versions between March 1933 and April 1936.

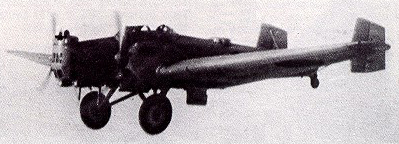
A Ki-1 in flight with gunners stations and ventral dustbin turret manned

== Operational history ==
The Mitsubishi Ki-1 was also designated Mitsubishi Army Type 93-I Heavy Bomber under the long aircraft nomenclature system used by the Japanese military. Already obsolete by the time of its introduction, it found use during the counterinsurgency operations of the Pacification of Manchukuo, as well as limited use during the Second Sino-Japanese War.

The design was upgraded to the Mitsubishi Ki-1-II (Mitsubishi Army Type 93-II Heavy Bomber) with a strengthened airframe and slightly more powerful 723 hp (539 kW) Mitsubishi Ha2-III V-12 engines, which increased maximum speed to 230 km/h (140 mph). However, even with the new engines, the Ki-1 was still underpowered and was unable to maintain altitude during single engine flights, which proved to be a serious issue during the aircraft's operational service due to the lack of reliability of the engines. It was replaced in 1937 by the Fiat BR.20.

== Variants ==
Ki-1-I (Army Type 93-I Heavy Bomber)
Initial production variant, powered by two 701 hp (523 kW) Mitsubishi Ha2-II (Army Type 93-II 700 hp Water Cooled In-line) V-12 engines.
Ki-1-II (Army Type 93-II Heavy Bomber)
Improved version with more powerful engines, strengthened airframe, powered by two 723 hp (539 kW) Mitsubishi Ha2-III (Army Type 93-III 700 hp Water Cooled In-line) V-12 engines.

== Operators ==
=== Military operators ===
Japan

- Imperial Japanese Army Air Force

== Specifications (Ki-1-I) ==
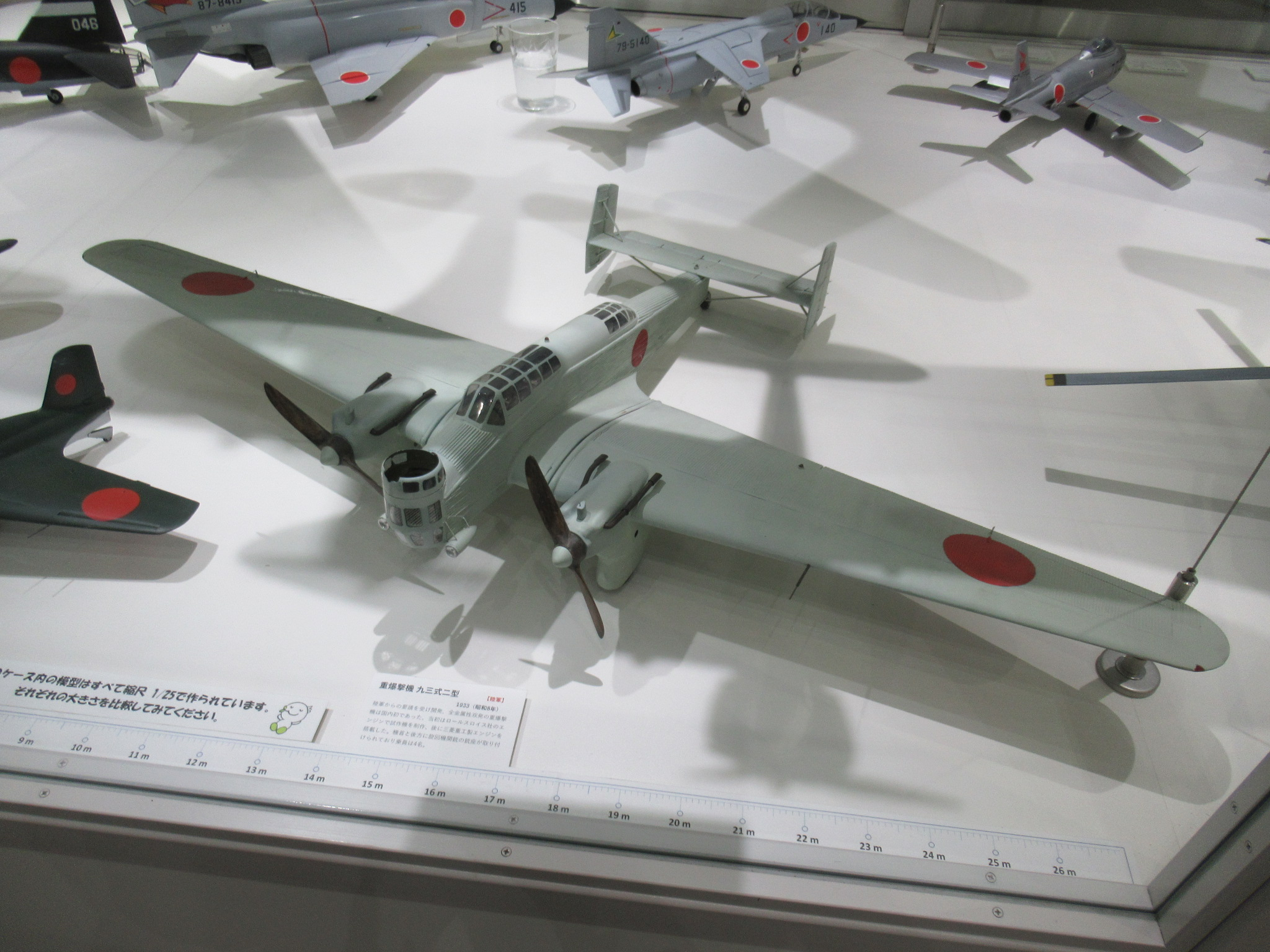
Mitsubishi Ki-1 (Model at the Mitsubishi Minatomirai Industrial Museum)

Data from The Encyclopedia of World Aircraft

General characteristics

- Crew: 4
- Length: 14.8 m (48 ft 7 in)
- Wingspan: 26.5 m (86 ft 11 in)
- Height: 4.92 m (16 ft 2 in)
- Empty weight: 4,880 kg (10,759 lb)
- Gross weight: 8,100 kg (17,857 lb)
- Powerplant: 2 × Mitsubishi Ha2-II V-12 water-cooled piston engines, 523 kW (701 hp) each
- Propellers: 2-bladed wooden fixed-pitch propellers

Performance

- Maximum speed: 220 km/h (140 mph, 120 kn)
- Service ceiling: 5,000 m (16,000 ft)

Armament

- Guns: 3× 7.7 mm (0.303 in) machine guns
- Bombs: 1,500 kg (3,300 lb) of bombs

== See also ==
Related lists

- List of military aircraft of Japan

== Bibliography ==
- Donald, David, ed. (1997). The Encyclopedia of World Aircraft. Prospero Books. p. 652. ISBN 1-85605-375-X.
- Lake, Jon (2002). Great Book of Bombers. Zenith Press. p. 86. ISBN 0-7603-1347-4.
- Mikesh, Robert C.; Abe, Shorzoe (1990). Japanese Aircraft, 1910-1941. Annapolis, MD: Naval Institute Press. ISBN 1-55750-563-2.
- Passingham, Malcolm (March 1999). "Les bombardiers de l'Armée japonaise (1920–1935) 2ème partie et fin" [Japanese Army Bombers (1920–1935)]. Avions: Toute l'aéronautique et son histoire (in French) (72): 29–36. ISSN 1243-8650.
