= List of Japanese aircraft in use during the Second Sino-Japanese War =

This is a list of Japanese Aircraft in use during the Second Sino-Japanese War. Allied nicknames are in quotes (").

== Japanese Army Aircraft ==
=== Reconnaissance ===
- Kawasaki Ki-88 (KDA-2)
- Nakajima Ki-4
- Mitsubishi Ki-15 "Babs"
- Mitsubishi Ki-46 "Dinah"

=== Liaison/Training ===
- Nakajima J.S.S.F.
- Kokusai Ki-86 "Cypress"
- Mansyu Ki-79
- Nakajima Ki-27a-Kai & Ki-27b-Kai "Nate"
- Tachikawa Ki-9 "Spruce"
- Tachikawa Ki-17 "Cedar"
- Tachikawa Ki-24
- Tachikawa Ki-54 "Hickory"
- Tachikawa Ki-55 "Ida"

=== Light bombers ===
- Kawasaki Ki-3
- Mitsubishi Ki-2
- Kawasaki Type 88 (KDA-2)
- Kawasaki Ki-32 "Mary"
- Mitsubishi Ki-30 "Ann"
- Mitsubishi Ki-51 "Sonia"
- Kawasaki Ki-48 "Lily"

=== Dive bombers ===
- Nakajima Ki-4
- Kawasaki Ki-32 "Mary"

=== Army land support ===
- Tachikawa Ki-36 "Ida"

=== Ground attack ===
- Rikugun Ki-93-Ib
- Kawasaki Ki-102b "Randy"

=== Heavy bombers ===
- Mitsubishi Ki-1
- Mitsubishi Ki-2
- Mitsubishi Ki-21 "Sally"
- Fiat BR.20 Cicogna (85 examples)
- Nakajima Ki-49 Donryu "Helen"
- Mitsubishi Ki-67 Hiryu "Peggy"

=== Fighters ===
- Nakajima Type 91(NC)
- Kawasaki Ki-10 "Perry"
- Nakajima Ki-27 "Nate" or "Abdul"
- Nakajima Ki-43 Hayabusa "Oscar"
- Nakajima Ki-44 Shoki "Tojo"
- Kawasaki Ki-61 Hien "Tony"
- Nakajima Ki-84 Hayate "Frank"

=== Heavy fighters ===
- Kawasaki Ki-45 Toryu "Nick"
- Kawasaki Ki-51 Tokyo "Sonia"
- Kawasaki Ki-93 Toroku
- Rikugun Ki-93-Ia
- Kawasaki Ki-102a, Ki-102c "Randy"

=== Transports ===
- Fokker/Nakajima Ki-6 "Super Universal"
- Nakajima Ki-34 "Thora"
- Mitsubishi Ki-57 "Topsy"
- Kawasaki Ki-56 "Thalia"
- Kokusai Ki-59 "Theresa"
- Tachikawa Type LO "Thelma"
- Tachikawa Ki-54 "Hickory"

=== Autogyro ===
- Kayaba Ka-1

== Japanese Navy Aircraft ==
=== Reconnaissance ===
- Mitsubishi C5M "Babs"
- Nakajima C6N Saiun "Myrt"

=== Reconnaissance Seaplanes ===
- Nakajima E4N
- Kawanishi E7K "Alf"
- Nakajima E8N "Dave"
- Watanabe E9W "Slim"
- Aichi E10A "Hank"
- Aichi E11A "Laura"
- Aichi E13A "Jake"
- Aichi E16A "Paul"
- Yokosuka E14Y "Glen"
- Mitsubishi F1M "Pete"

=== Dive bombers ===
- Aichi D1A "Susie"
- Aichi D3A "Val"
- Yokosuka D4Y Suisei "Judy"
- Aichi B7A Ryūsei "Grace"
- Mitsubishi A6M7 model 62,63 Rei-Sen "Hamp"/"Zeke"

=== Flying boat ===
- Kawanishi H6K "Mavis"
- Kawanishi H8K "Emily"

=== Fighters ===
- Nakajima A4N
- Nakajima A6M2-N "Rufe"
- Mitsubishi A5M "Claude"
- Mitsubishi A6M Rei-Sen "Zero"
- Heinkel He 112 (Japanese designation A7He1)
- Mitsubishi A6M Zero Rei-Sen "Hamp"/"Zeke"
- Nakajima J1N Gekko "Irving"
- Mitsubishi J2M Raiden "Jack"
- Kawanishi N1K Kyofu "Terry"

=== Escort Fighter ===
- Seversky 2PA-B3 "Convoy Fighter" (Japanese design:A8V1) "Dick"

=== Torpedo Bombers ===
- Yokosuka B4Y "Jean"
- Nakajima B5N "Kate"
- Mitsubishi B5M "Mabel"
- Nakajima B6N Tenzan "Jill"
- Aichi B7A Ryūsei "Grace"
- Mitsubishi G3M "Nell"
- Mitsubishi G4M "Betty"
- Yokosuka P1Y Ginga "Frances"
- Mitsubishi Ki-67 Hiryu "Peggy"

=== Torpedo Bombers ===
- Nakajima B5N "Kate"

=== Medium Bombers ===
- Mitsubishi G3M "Nell"
- Mitsubishi G4M "Betty"
- Yokosuka P1Y Ginga "Frances"
- Mitsubishi Ki-67 Yasukuni "Peggy"

=== Antisubmarine Patrol ===
- Kyushu K11W Shiragiku
- Kyushu Q1W Tokai "Lorna"

=== Transport ===
- Kawanishi H6K2-L & H6K4-L "Mavis"
- Kawanishi H8K1-L, H8K2-L & H8K4-L "Emily"
- Nakajima C2N
- Mitsubishi G6M1-L2
- Mitsubishi K3M "Pine"
- Mitsubishi L3Y "Tina"
- Showa/Nakajima L2D "Tabby"

=== Trainer/Liaison ===
- Aichi D3A2-K "Val"
- Tokyo Gasu Denki LXG-1
- Kyushu K9W "Cypress"
- Kyushu K10W "Oak"
- Kyushu K11W Shiragiku
- Mitsubishi A5M4-K "Claude"
- Mitsubishi A6M2-K & A6M5-K "Zeke"
- Mitsubishi G6M1-K "Betty"
- Nakajima B5N1-K "Kate"
- Yokosuka K5Y "Willow"

== See also ==
- Aerial Engagements of the Second Sino-Japanese War
- Development of Chinese Nationalist air force (1937-1945)
- List of aircraft of Japan during World War II
