= List of aircraft of Japan during World War II =

This is a list of aircraft used by the Imperial Japanese Army and Imperial Japanese Navy during World War II.

== Fighters ==
| Aircraft | Allied Code name | First flown | Number built | Service |
|---|---|---|---|---|
| Kawanishi N1K Kyofu Navy Fighter Seaplane | Rex | 1942 | 1532 | IJN |
| Kawanishi N1K1-J/N1K2-J Shiden Navy Land-Based Interceptor | George | 1943 | 1435 | IJN |
| Kawasaki Ki-10 Army Type 95 Fighter | Perry | 1935 | 588 | IJA |
| Kawasaki Ki-45 Toryu Army Type 2 Two-Seat Fighter | Nick | 1941 | 1370 | IJA |
| Kawasaki Ki-61 Hien Army Type 3 Fighter | Tony | 1943 | 3159 | IJA |
| Kawasaki Ki-100 Goshikisen Army Type 5 Fighter | n/a | 1945 | 395 | IJA |
| Kawasaki Ki-102 Army Type 4 Assault Aircraft | Randy | 1944 | 238 | IJA |
| Mitsubishi A5M Navy Type 96 Carrier-based Fighter | Claude | 1937 | 1094 | IJN |
| Mitsubishi A6M Zero-Sen Navy Type Zero Carrier Fighter | Zeke/Hamp | 1940 | 10939 | IJN |
| Mitsubishi A7M Reppū Navy Carrier-based Fighter | Sam | 1944 | 10 | IJN |
| Mitsubishi J2M Raiden Navy Interceptor Fighter | Jack | 1942 | 621 | IJN |
| Mitsubishi Ki-46-III-Kai Army Type 100 Air Defence Fighter | Dinah | 1941 | 1742 | IJA, IJN |
| Nakajima A6M2-N Navy Type 2 Interceptor/Fighter-Bomber | Rufe | 1941 | 327 | IJN |
| Nakajima J1N1-S Gekko | Irving | 1941 | 479 | IJN |
| Nakajima Ki-27 Army Type 97 Fighter | Nate | 1937 | 3368 | IJA |
| Nakajima Ki-43 Hayabusa Army Type 1 Fighter | Oscar | 1939 | 5919 | IJA |
| Nakajima Ki-44 Shoki Army Type 2 Single-Seat Fighter | Tojo | 1941 | 1225 | IJA |
| Nakajima Ki-84 Hayate Army Type 4 Fighter | Frank | 1943 | 3514 | IJA |

== Attack aircraft ==
| Aircraft | Allied Code name | First flown | Number built | Service |
|---|---|---|---|---|
| Aichi D3A Navy Type 99 Carrier Bomber | Val | 1940 | 1486 | IJN |
| Aichi B7A Ryusei Navy carrier torpedo bomber | Grace | 1942 | 114 | IJN |
| Aichi M6A1 Seiran Navy Special Strike Submarine Bomber | n/a | 1943 | 28 | IJN |
| Mitsubishi Ki-15 Army Type 97 Command Reconnaissance Plane | Babs | 1936 | 500~ | IJA |
| Mitsubishi Ki-51 Army Type 99 Assault Plane | Sonia | 1939 | 2385 | IJA |
| Mitsubishi B5M Navy Type 97 No.2 Carrier Attack Bomber | Mabel | 1937 | 125 | IJN |
| Nakajima B5N Navy Type 97 Carrier Attack Bomber | Kate | 1937 | 1150~ | IJN |
| Nakajima B6N Tenzan Navy Carrier Torpedo Bomber | Jill | 1941 | 1268 | IJN |
| Tachikawa Ki-36 Army Type 98 Direct Co-operation Aircraft | Ida | 1938 | 1334 | IJA |
| Yokosuka B4Y Navy Type 96 Carrier Attacker | Jean | 1935 | 205 | IJN |
| Yokosuka D4Y Suisei Navy Carrier Dive bomber | Judy | 1942 | 2038 | IJN |
| Yokosuka MXY-7 Ohka | Baka ('Fool' in Japanese) | 1944 | 852 | IJN |

== Bombers ==
| Aircraft | Allied Code Name | First Flown | Number Built | Service |
|---|---|---|---|---|
| Kawasaki Ki-48 Army Type 99 Twin-engined Light Bomber | Lily | 1940 | 1997 | IJA |
| Kawasaki Ki-32 Army Type 98 Light Bomber | Mary | 1937 | 854 | IJA |
| Mitsubishi G3M Navy Type 96 Land-based Attack Aircraft | Nell | 1935 | 1048 | IJN |
| Mitsubishi G4M Navy Type 1 Land-based Attack Aircraft | Betty | 1941 | 2435 | IJN |
| Mitsubishi Ki-21 Army Type 97 Heavy Bomber | Sally | 1938 | 2064 | IJA |
| Mitsubishi Ki-30 Army Type 97 Light bomber | Ann | 1938 | 704 | IJA |
| Mitsubishi Ki-67 Hiryu Army Type 4 Heavy Bomber | Peggy | 1942 | 767 | IJA |
| Nakajima Ki-49 Donryu Army Type 100 Heavy Bomber | Helen | 1941 | 819 | IJA |
| Yokosuka P1Y1 Ginga Navy Land-Based Bomber | Frances | 1943 | 1098 | IJN |

== Reconnaissance aircraft ==
| Aircraft | Allied Code name | First flown | Number built | Service |
|---|---|---|---|---|
| Aichi E13A Navy Type 0 Reconnaissance Seaplane | Jake | 1941 | 1418 | IJN |
| Aichi E16A Zuiun Navy Reconnaissance Seaplane | Paul | 1942 | 256 | IJN |
| Kawanishi E7K Navy Type 94 Reconnaissance Seaplane | Alf | 1933 | 533 | IJN |
| Kawanishi E15K Shiun Navy Type 2 High-speed Reconnaissance Seaplane | Norm | 1941 | 15 | IJN |
| Kawanishi H6K Type 97 Large Flying Boat | Mavis | 1936 | 215 | IJN |
| Kawanishi H8K Type 2 Large Flying Boat | Emily | 1941 | 167 | IJN |
| Kawasaki Ki-10 Army Type 95 Fighter (used for reconnaissance during WW II) | Perry | 1935 | 588 | IJA |
| Mitsubishi F1M Type 0 Observation Seaplane | Pete | 1936 | 1118 | IJN |
| Mitsubishi Ki-46 Type 100 Command Reconnaissance Aircraft | Dinah | 1941 | 1742 | IJA |
| Nakajima C3N Navy Carrier Reconnaissance Plane | | 1936 | 2 | IJN |
| Nakajima C6N Saiun Navy Carrier Reconnaissance Plane | Myrt | 1943 | 463 | IJN |
| Nakajima E8N Navy Type 95 Reconnaissance Seaplane Model 1 | Dave | 1934 | 755 | IJN |
| Nakajima J1N Gekkou Navy Type 2 Reconnaissance Plane | Irving | 1942 | 479 | IJN |
| Watanabe E9W Navy Type 96 Small Reconnaissance Seaplane | Slim | 1935 | 35 | IJN |
| Yokosuka E14Y Type 0 Small Reconnaissance Seaplane | Glen | 1939 | 126 | IJN |

== Trainers ==
Trainer aircraft of the Imperial Japanese Navy during World War II were frequently modified from operational aircraft and differentiated by the suffix letter "K". Japanese training aircraft were red-orange where combat aircraft would have been camouflaged.

| Aircraft | Allied Code name | First flown | Number built | Service |
|---|---|---|---|---|
| Aichi M6A1-K Nanzan Navy Special Strike Submarine Bomber trainer | n/a | 1943 | 2 | IJN |
| Kawanishi N1K2-K Shiden Navy Land Interceptor modified as Fighter Trainer | George | 1943 | | IJN |
| Kyushu K10W1 Navy Type 2 Land-based Intermediate Trainer | Oak | 1941 | 176 | IJN |
| Kyushu K11W1 Shiragiku Navy Operations Trainer | n/a | 1942 | 798 | IJN |
| Kyushu Q1W1-K Tokai-Ren | Lorna | 1943 | 153 | IJN |
| Mansyu Ki-79 Army Type 2 Advanced Trainer | Nate | 1936 | 1329 | IJA |
| Mitsubishi A5M4-K Navy Carrier Fighter Type 96, model 4 | Claude | 1935 | 103 | IJN |
| Mitsubishi A6M2-K & A6M5-K Navy Carrier Fighter Type 0 | Zeke | 1939 | 243 | IJN |
| Mitsubishi G3M1/2-K | Nell | 1935 | 1048 | IJN |
| Mitsubishi G6M1-K Navy Land Trainer | Betty | 1939 | | IJN |
| Mitsubishi K3M Navy Type 90 Crew Training Aircraft | Pine | 1930 | 625 | IJN |
| Nakajima A4N1-K | n/a | 1934 | 221 | IJN |
| Tachikawa Ki-9 Army Type 95-1 Medium Grade Trainer | Spruce | 1935 | 2618 | IJA |
| Tachikawa Ki-17 Army Type 95-3 Basic Grade Trainer | Cedar | 1935 | 560 | IJA |
| Tachikawa Ki-54 Army Type 1 Advanced Trainer | Hickory | 1940 | 1368 | IJA |
| Tachikawa Ki-55 Army Type 99 Advanced Trainer | Ida | 1939 | 1389 | IJA |
| Yokosuka K5Y1 | Willow | 1933 | 5770 | IJN |
| Yokosuka MXY-7 Ohka Model 43 K-1 Kai | n/a | 1944 | 45 | IJN |
| Yokosuka MXY-8 Akigusa | n/a | 1945 | 50-60 | IJN |

== Transports ==
| Aircraft | Allied Code name | First flown | Number built | Service |
|---|---|---|---|---|
| Kawasaki Ki-56 Army Type 1 Freight Transport & Tachikawa Navy Type LO | Thalia/Thelma | 1940 | 121 | IJA |
| Mitsubishi Ki-57 Army Type 100 Transport | Topsy | 1940 | 406 | IJA & IJN |
| Nakajima Ki-34 Army Type 97 Transport & Nakajima L1N Navy Type AT-2 Transport | Thora | 1936 | 351 | IJA & IJN |
| Showa/Nakajima L2D Navy Type 0 Transport | Tabby | 1939 | 487 | IJN |
| Mitsubishi Hinazuru-type Passenger Transport | n/a | 1936 | 11 | IJN |

A total of 85611 aircraft were produced by Japan in WW2.

== Experimental aircraft ==
| Aircraft | Allied Code name | First flown | Number built |
|---|---|---|---|
| Kyushu J7W Shinden | n/a | 3 August 1945 | 2 |
| Mitsubishi Ki-83 | n/a | 1944 | 4 |
| Mitsubishi J8M | n/a | 1944 | 7 |
| Nakajima G8N | Rita | 1944 | 4 |
| Nakajima Ki-87 | n/a | 1945 | 1 |
| Tachikawa Ki-94-I | n/a | 1944 | 2 |
| Tachikawa Ki-94-II | n/a | n/a | 2 |
