= R38 (disambiguation) =

R38 is a class of British airships, of which only one was completed.

R38 may also refer to:

- R-38 (missile), a Soviet prototype air-to-air missile
- R38 (New York City Subway car)
- R38 (South Africa), a road
- HMS R38, a submarine of the Royal Navy
- HMS Victorious (R38), an aircraft carrier of the Royal Navy
- R38: Irritating to skin, a risk phrase
- Renard R.38, a Belgian aircraft
- Small nucleolar RNA R38
- Tachikawa R-38, a Japanese training aircraft
- R38, a car design of London Underground R Stock trains
