= Tachikawa R-38 =

Japanese civil trainer aircraft

R-38

General information
- Type: Training aircraft
- National origin: Japan
- Manufacturer: Tachikawa Aircraft Company
- Number built: 2

History
- First flight: 22 February 1939

The Tachikawa R-38 was a Japanese training aircraft of the late 1930s. It was a single-engined parasol monoplane that was intended for use by civil training schools. Two examples were built, with the Japanese Military's control of resources preventing any further production.

== Design and development ==
In 1938, the Tachikawa Aircraft Company, which was building large numbers of its Ki-9 and Ki-17 basic and primary trainers for the Imperial Japanese Army, began work on a new training aircraft for use by civilian training schools. The aircraft, the Tachikawa R-38 (Note: R stood for Renshuki or trainer, while 38 represented the year of the design.), was a single-engined parasol wing monoplane. It had a fabric-covered welded steel tube fuselage and a wood and metal wing. The student and instructor sat in separate tandem open cockpits.

The first prototype was powered by a 150 horsepower (110 kW) Gasuden Jimpu seven-cylinder radial engine driving a two-bladed propeller and made its first flight on 22 February 1939. The aircraft was tested by the Japanese Army, with the conclusion that the lighter R-38 was superior to the Army's Ki-17 primary trainer, which used the same engine. As the Ki-17 was already in production, however, the Army had no need for a new trainer. A second prototype, the R-38-Kai was built powered by an experimental 120 horsepower (89 kW) Kosoku KO-4 four-cylinder air-cooled inline engine, produced by a subsidiary of Tachikawa. The R-38-Kai flew in July 1941.

No production of the R-38 or the R-38-Kai followed. From 1938, all major Japanese aircraft companies were required to be licensed by the government, with the armed services controlling the management of the companies. As there was no military requirement for the R-38, the Japanese Army prevented any further production.

== Specifications (R-38) ==
Data from Japanese Aircraft 1910–1941

General characteristics

- Crew: 2
- Length: 7.62 m (25 ft 0 in)
- Wingspan: 10.80 m (35 ft 5 in)
- Height: 2.78 m (9 ft 1 in)
- Wing area: 19.0 m^{2} (205 sq ft)
- Empty weight: 599 kg (1,321 lb)
- Gross weight: 837 kg (1,845 lb)
- Powerplant: 1 × Gasuden Jimpu 6 seven-cylinder air-cooled radial engine, 120 kW (160 hp)

Performance

- Maximum speed: 206 km/h (128 mph, 111 kn)
- Cruise speed: 152 km/h (94 mph, 82 kn)
- Range: 280 km (170 mi, 150 nmi)
- Endurance: 2 hr 12 min
- Service ceiling: 6,350 m (20,830 ft)
