= R53 =

R53 may refer to:

- R53 (South Africa), a road
- HMS Undaunted (R53), a destroyer of the Royal Navy
- Junkers R53, a transport aircraft
- Mini Hatch (R53), a car
- Nissan Pathfinder (R53), a sport utility vehicle
- R53: May cause long-term adverse effects in the aquatic environment, a risk phrase
- Tachihi R-53, a training aircraft
