= Ishikawajima =

Ishikawajima could refer to:

- IHI Corporation, formerly known as Ishikawajima-Harima Heavy Industries
- Tachikawa Aircraft Company
- Ishikawajima Motorcar Manufacturing Company (currently Isuzu)
