= Tachikawa Ki-92 =

Japanese transport aircraft prototype

Ki-92

General information
- Type: Transport aircraft
- Manufacturer: Tachikawa Hikōki KK
- Designer: Shinjiro Shinagawa
- Primary user: Imperial Japanese Army Air Service
- Number built: 1

History
- First flight: April 1945

The Tachikawa Ki-92 was an experimental Japanese heavy transport aircraft of World War II. It was a low-wing monoplane with a pressurized fuselage, twin piston engines and a tailwheel undercarriage.

== Development ==
In March 1942 the Imperial Japanese Army Air Service chose Tachikawa Aircraft Company to design and build a new heavy twin engine transport aircraft with a focus on increased range, power and speed to carry light tanks, field artillery and troops.

Shinjiro Shinagawa was in charge of the development and began work in March 1943 and had the first prototype completed by September 1944. Like Tachikawa's Ki-77 the aircraft featured a laminar flow airfoil. The Ki-92 also had a sealed cabin with double glazed windows seating 34 troops in 4 rows (including two emergency seats) to reduce the need for oxygen, and forced draught cooling in low drag engine nacelles. Due to various repairs and modifications, the first flight did not occur until April 1945. The test flight recorded a maximum speed of 426 km/h, but the Ki-92 was found to be dangerous to fly with the cargo door open at these speeds even though fuselage rigidity was not a problem.

Due to the deteriorating war situation and resulting reduction in priority for transport aircraft, of the three to 10 prototypes planned for, only one prototype and no production aircraft were built before the war ended. Orders included 114 constructed extensively from wood to conserve aluminium, though the Ki-92 prototype already featured a tail made from wood. Tachikawa had planned for their potential use as commercial transports during the design phase.

Allied intelligence organizations such as ATAIU SEA were unaware of the existence of the Ki-92 and did not assign a code name to it.

== Operators ==
Japan

- Imperial Japanese Army Air Service (Evaluation only)

== Specifications (Tachikawa Ki-92) ==
Data from Japanese Aircraft of the Pacific War

General characteristics

- Crew: 5
- Capacity: 34 troops
- Length: 22 m (72 ft 2 in)
- Wingspan: 32 m (105 ft 0 in)
- Height: 5.95 m (19 ft 6 in)
- Wing area: 122 m^{2} (1,310 sq ft)
- Empty weight: 11,175 kg (24,637 lb)
- Gross weight: 17,600 kg (38,801 lb)
- Powerplant: 2 × Mitsubishi Ha104 (Army Type 4 1,900hp Air Cooled Radial) 18-cylinder air-cooled radial piston engines, 1,390 kW (1,870 hp) each
- Propellers: 4-bladed constant-speed propellers

Performance

- Maximum speed: 466 km/h (290 mph, 252 kn)
- Range: 3,960–5,000 km (2,460–3,110 mi, 2,140–2,700 nmi) (estimated)
- Service ceiling: 10,100 m (33,100 ft)
- Time to altitude: 7,000 m (23,000 ft) in 18 minutes 20 seconds

Armament

- Guns: 1x 12.7 mm (0.50 in) Ho-103 machine gun (not fitted to prototype)

== See also ==
Related development

- Tachikawa Ki-77

Aircraft of comparable role, configuration, and era

- Curtiss C-46 Commando
