= Tachikawa T.S. 1 =

Japanese trainer aircraft prototype

General information
- Type: Light trainer
- National origin: Japan
- Manufacturer: Tachikawa Aircraft Company Ltd

History
- Introduction date: 1937

The Tachikawa T.S 1 was a light trainer prototype built in Japan.

== Design and development ==
The low-cost all wood construction aircraft was unique in having a complex retractable landing gear.

The aircraft was not put into production due to a limited market and high cost to manufacture.

== Specifications (Tachikawa T.S. 1) ==
Data from EAA

General characteristics

- Capacity: 1
- Length: 5.94 m (19 ft 6 in)
- Wingspan: 7.75 m (25 ft 5 in)
- Height: 1.73 m (5 ft 8 in)
- Wing area: 10.00 m^{2} (107.6 sq ft)
- Empty weight: 189 kg (416 lb)
- Gross weight: 279 kg (616 lb)
- Powerplant: 1 × Scott Flying Squirrel two cylinder inverted piston, 21 kW (28 hp)

Performance

- Maximum speed: 169 km/h (105 mph, 91 kn)
- Cruise speed: 121 km/h (75 mph, 65 kn)
- Stall speed: 63 km/h (39 mph, 34 kn)
- Range: 488 km (303 mi, 263 nmi)
- Service ceiling: 3,299 m (10,824 ft)
