= Ishikawajima R-3 =

Japanese trainer aircraft

R-3
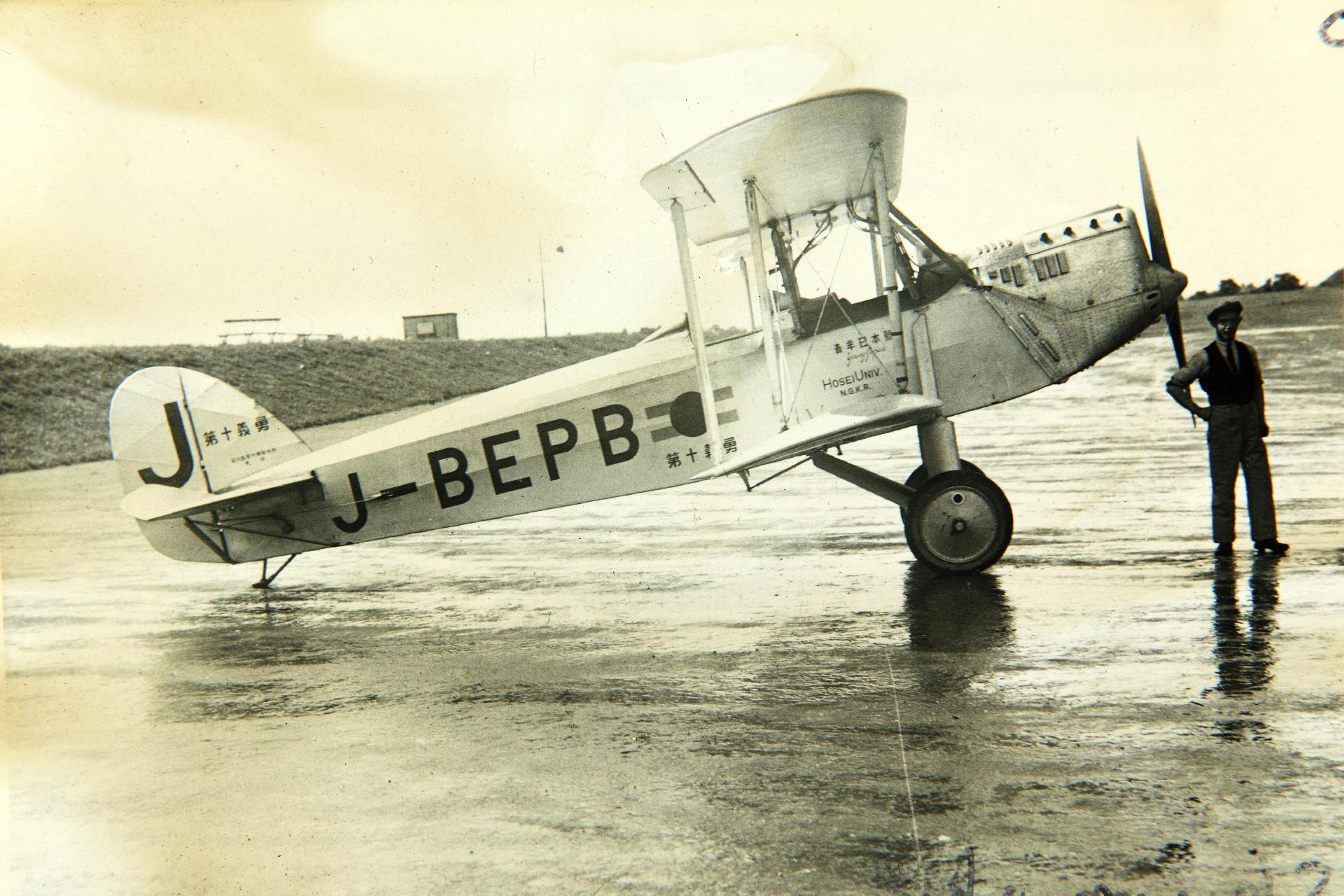
- R-3 J-BEPB as flown Tokyo to Rome in 1931

General information
- Type: two seat trainer
- National origin: Japan
- Manufacturer: Ishikawajima Aircraft Works
- Number built: 2

History
- First flight: c.1930

The Ishikawajima R-3 was a Japanese training biplane seating two in tandem. Two were built, one of which made a tour of Western and Central Europe in 1932.

== Design and development ==
The R-3 was a small biplane trainer of mixed construction. The wings had wooden structures and were ply-covered around the leading edges and on the undersides. Their covering was completed with fabric over all surfaces. Interplane struts were metal and the fabric-covered ailerons, fitted on both upper and lower wings, had metal structures.

The fuselage was a fabric-covered steel tube structure. The engine mountings accepted several versions of the ADC Cirrus engine, the 85 hp (63 kW) Cirrus II, 90 hp (67 kW) Cirrus III or 110 hp (82 kW) Cirrus Hermes. Instructor and pupil had separate open cockpits in tandem, equipped with dual controls. Its conventional landing gear was also steel, with oleo-rubber landing legs.

== Operational history ==
Only two R-3 are known to have flown but one made an extended tour of Europe in the late summer of 1932, piloted by two Japanese university students supported by the Japan Aeronautical League of Students. For this tour extra tankage increased the R-3's endurance from about 3.5 hrs to 10.5 hrs. Flying from Japan to Western Europe via Siberia, they covered 14,000 km (8,700 mi; 7,600 nmi) and visited at least four capitals as well as other cities.

== Specifications (with Cirrus Hermes I engine) ==
Data from Aero Digest, December 1932

General characteristics

- Crew: 2, pupil and instructor
- Length: 7.49 m (24 ft 7 in)
- Wingspan: 10.11 m (33 ft 2 in)
- Height: 2.90 m (9 ft 6 in)
- Wing area: 24.49 m^{2} (263.6 sq ft)
- Empty weight: 454 kg (1,000 lb)
- Gross weight: 679 kg (1,498 lb)
- Powerplant: 1 × Cirrus Hermes I 4-cylinder air-cooled inline piston engine, 82 kW (110 hp)
- Propellers: 2-bladed fixed-pitch propeller

Performance

- Maximum speed: 163 km/h (101 mph, 88 kn)
- Minimum speed: 64 km/h (40 mph; 35 kn)
- Endurance: 3.5 hrs
- Service ceiling: 6,100 m (20,000 ft)
- Rate of climb: 3.47 m/s (683 ft/min) to 1,000 m (3,300 ft)
