= Tachikawa Aircraft Company =

1924–1945 aircraft manufacturer in Japan

Tachikawa Aircraft Company Ltd
- Founded: 1924 (as Ishikawajima Aircraft Manufacturing Company)
- Defunct: 1955
- Fate: Assets seized during US occupation, spun off automotive unit (Prince); changed business towards real estate development, consumer electronics, automotive parts
- Successor: Tachihi K.K.
- Headquarters: Tachikawa, Japan
- Owner: Ishikawajima Shipyards 1924-1936; Imperial Japanese Army 1936-1945; US Occupation authority 1945-1949

Tachikawa Aircraft Company Limited (立川飛行機株式会社, Tachikawa Hikōki Kabushiki Kaisha) was an aircraft manufacturer in the Empire of Japan, specializing primarily in aircraft for the Imperial Japanese Army Air Force. It was based at Tachikawa, in Tokyo Prefecture.

== History ==
=== Tachikawa Aircraft ===
In November 1924, Ishikawajima Shipyards (the future IHI Corporation) established a subsidiary company, the Ishikawajima Aircraft Manufacturing Company (石川島飛行機製作所, Ishikawajima Hikōki Seisakushō). The company's first aircraft was a primary training aircraft called the Red Dragonfly.

In 1936, the Imperial Japanese Army acquired a controlling interest in the company, and renamed it the Tachikawa Aircraft Company Ltd. The company manufactured a number of types, mostly training aircraft and fighters for the Imperial Japanese Army. Some were its own designs placed into full production, such as the Ki-9 and Ki-36. A number of others were either short-run specials, or prototypes that did not enter production, such as the Ki-77.

In 1940, the company received license-production rights to the Lockheed Model 14 Super Electra which it produced as the Army Type LO transport. Tachikawa also produced aircraft designed by other Japanese manufacturers.

As with all Japanese manufacturers, production of all types ceased after the surrender of Japan to Allied forces in August 1945. The facilities of Tachikawa Aircraft had been severely damaged by bombing during the war, and most of its property, including its airfield, were seized by the American military and become part of the Tachikawa Air Base. Many of its engineers went to work for Nissan and Toyota, helping develop the technologies of the Japanese automobile industry. The Prince Motor Company (later acquired by Nissan) was a direct spin-out from the former Tachikawa Aircraft Company.

=== New Tachikawa Aircraft Company ===
During the occupation of Japan after the end of World War II, all of Japan's aerospace industry was dismantled, designs destroyed and plants converted to other uses. After the ban on aircraft development was lifted in November 1949, Tachikawa Aircraft was reconstituted as the New Tachikawa Aircraft Company Ltd (新立川飛行機株式会社, Shin Tachikawa Kōkūki Kabushiki Kaisha).

Shin Tachikawa built prototype training aircraft, the R-52 and R-53 in the early 1950s. The R-52 was the first post-war, all-Japanese aircraft constructed. However, neither aircraft were commercially successful and the company survived by making precision components for aircraft, and for non-aircraft related industries. In 1955, the company name was changed to Tachihi Kigyō (立飛企業株式会社, Tachihi K.K.) to emphasize its lack of involvement with the aviation industry. Since 1976, after the return of a large amount of land occupied by the United States Air Force since the end of World War II, the company turned towards real estate development, consumer electronics, and the production of automotive parts.

== Ishikawajima Aircraft ==
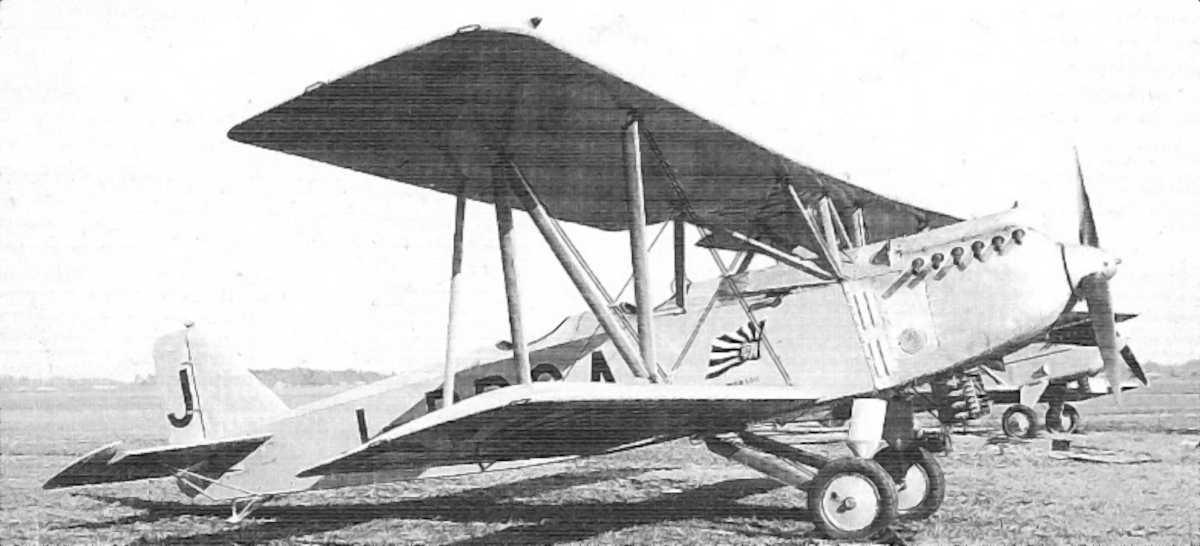
Ichikawajima T-3 experimental reconnaissance aircraft

- Ishikawajima T-2 - 1927 prototype reconnaissance aircraft. Two built.
- Ishikawajima CM-1 (later Ishikawajima R-1) - 1927 basic trainer with wooden structure. One built.
- Ishikawajima R-2 - 1927 basic trainer with all metal structure. Two built.
- Ishikawajima T-3 - 1928 prototype reconnaissance aircraft. One built.
- Ishikawajima R-3 - 1929 basic trainer. Five built.
- Ishikawajima R-5 - 1933 basic trainer. Two built.

== Tachikawa Aircraft ==
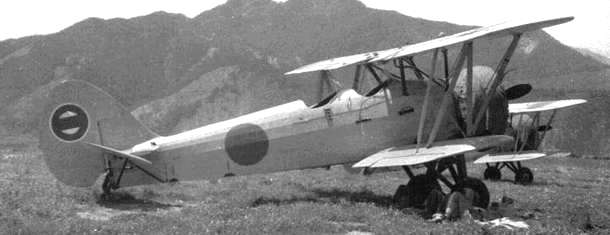
Tachikawa Ki-9 primary trainer

- Ki-9 - 'Spruce' 1930 biplane intermediate trainer
- KKY - Light ambulance aircraft - 23 built.
- KS - Survey aircraft for Japanese Government Railways - based on KKY. Two built 1939.
- Ki-17 - 'Cedar' 1935 biplane basic trainer
- Ki-24 - DFS SG 38 built under license
- Ki-25 - 1937 prototype glider based on the Göppingen Gö 3
- Ki-26 - 1936 prototype training glider
- Ki-29 - 1936 prototype light bomber; lost to the Mitsubishi Ki-30
- Ki-36 - 'Ida' 1938 Army co-operation aircraft
- Ki-54 - 'Hickory' 1940 twin-engine advanced monoplane trainer
- Ki-55 - 'Ida' 1940 single-engine advanced trainer developed from the Ki-36
- Ki-70 - 'Clara' 1943 prototype high-speed photo reconnaissance aircraft
- Ki-72 - Re-engined version of Ki-36 with retractable landing gear, not built
- Ki-74 - 'Pat'/'Patsy' 1944 prototype high-altitude reconnaissance bomber
- Ki-77 - 1942 experimental twin-engine long-range transport/communications aircraft
- Ki-92 - experimental twin-engine long-range transport aircraft
- Ki-94 - prototype high-altitude fighter-interceptor
- Ki-104 - attack version of Ki-94, not built
- Ki-110 - wooden prototype of Ki-54
- Ki-111 - fuel tanker project
- Ki-114 - projected wooden fuel tanker
- Ki-120 - transport version of Ki-74
- Ki-128 - kamikaze aircraft
- T.S. 1 - Light trainer
- R-38 - Parasol-winged civil trainer. Two built.
- Type LO Transport Aircraft - Lockheed Model 14 Super Electra built under license

== Shin Tachikawa Aircraft ==
- Tachihi R-52 - civilian training aircraft
- Tachihi R-53 - civilian training aircraft
- Tachihi R-MH-310 - civilian training aircraft

== See also ==
- Mechanical Engineering Heritage (Japan), No. 40: Electric vehicle TAMA
- Tatsuo Hasegawa
- Jiro Tanaka
- Air raids on Japan#Destruction of Japan's main cities
