= Manchukuo Imperial Air Force =

Air force of Manchukuo, a Japanese puppet state (1937-1945)

- 飛行隊
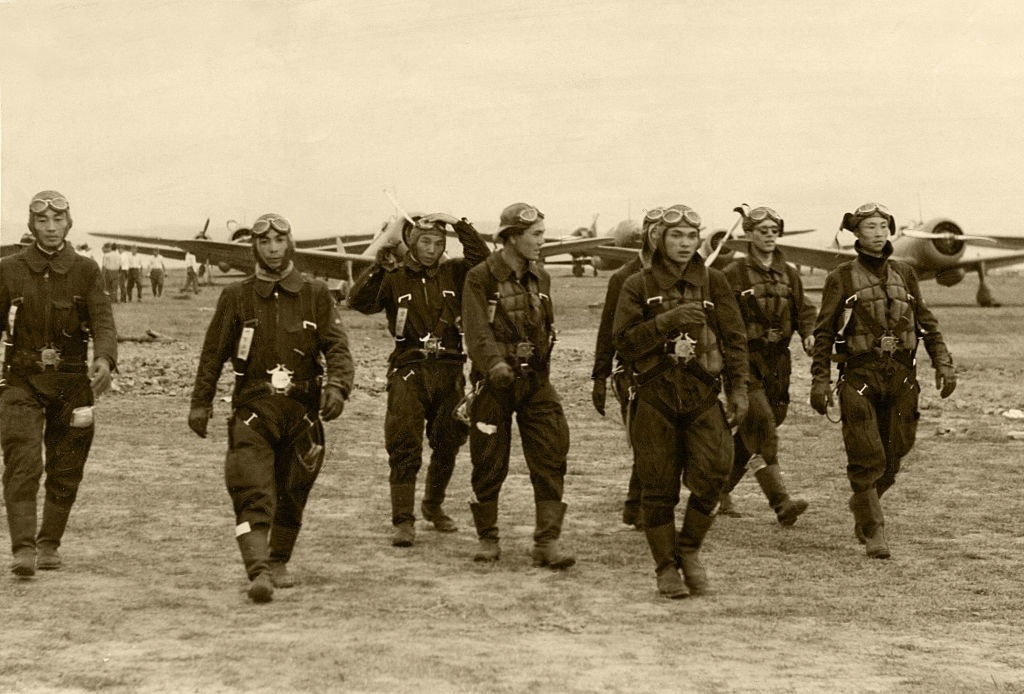
- Pilots of the Manchukuo Imperial Air Force in Japan, Nakajima Ki-27 fighter aircraft in background, 1942
- Active: 1937–1945
- Country: Manchukuo
- Role: Air force
- Size: 200+ aircraft
- Garrison/HQ: Xinjing
- Colors: Yellow, blue, white
- Anniversaries: September 20 (Aviation Day)
- Engagements: Second Sino-Japanese War; World War II

Commanders
- Ceremonial chief: Kangde Emperor

Insignia
- Roundel

The Manchukuo Imperial Air Force (Chinese: 飛行隊; pinyin: Fēixíng Duì; Japanese: 大満州帝国空軍, romanized: Dai Manshū Teikoku Kūgun) was the air force of Manchukuo, a puppet state of Imperial Japan. The air force's predecessor was the Manchukuo Air Transport Company (later renamed the Manchukuo National Airways), a paramilitary airline formed in 1931, which undertook transport and reconnaissance missions for the Japanese military.

After taking on various combat and support roles at Japanese direction during World War II- notably missions attempting to intercept American B-29 strategic bombers and training for kamikaze missions- the Manchukuo Imperial Air Force, like the Manchukuo puppet state itself, was disbanded in 1945 after Japan's defeat.

== History ==
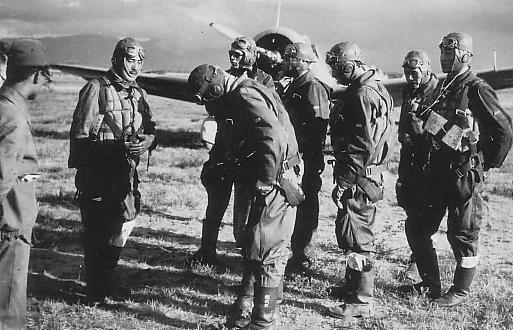
Pilots of the Imperial Air Force in 1942, with a Nakajima Ki-27 behind

Since the creation of the state in 1932, an airline called the Manchukuo Paramilitary Airline operated as a fleet of transports, consisting mainly of passenger aircraft. The only military action it saw was providing support to the Inner Mongolian Army during the Suiyuan Campaign in 1936. An "independent volunteer battalion" which included thirteen planes assisted the Inner Mongolian troops in their attempt to drive the Nationalists out of the Suiyuan province. The official Manchukuo Air Force was not established until February 1937, when thirty volunteers from the Manchukuo Imperial Army were sent to Harbin for training. Initially the Kwantung Army commanders did not trust the Manchukuoans enough to give them an independent air arm and the early air force consisted of mostly Japanese pilots.

Starting out with just one Nieuport-Delage NiD 29, the first air unit was based in Xinjing (Changchun). They were soon expanded with the addition of Nakajima Army Type 91 fighters and Kawasaki Type 88 light bombers. A second air unit was formed in Fengtian and a third was formed in Harbin between 1938–39, and in July 1940 a Manchukuo Air Defense headquarters was established in Xinjing. At that time the Japanese finally decided to give the state its own air force with Manchukuoan pilots and more modern aircraft. A flying school was opened in Mukden for both military and civil pilots as part of this effort. This program suffered a major setback when one hundred Manchukuoan pilots rebelled and tried to join the guerrillas after murdering their Japanese instructors. Nonetheless the project to create an air force for Manchukuo continued. Three fighter squadrons were formed from cadets in 1942.

Lt. Sonoo Kasuga (春日園生) of the Manchurian Air Force

In the 1940s the Manchukuo Air Force was greatly expanded with an influx of new trainers, transports, and its first fighters. The latter were Nakajima Ki-27 fighters which were presented on Aviation Day, 20 September 1942. The trainers included Tachikawa Ki-9s and Tachikawa Ki-55s, while some Mitsubishi Ki-57 transports were also provided. The only bomber craft it had were provided by Kawasaki Ki-32 light bombers. Money to pay for these craft was donated by local companies in Manchukuo with Japanese "encouragement". They were also given Nakajima Ki-43s in 1945 to have a better chance of intercepting the American B-29 Superfortresses. The Manchukuoan pilots were given the estimated arrival time of the bombers and would take off about twenty minutes before they were due to arrive, climbing to 7,000 meters to make head-on passes before the B-29s got out of range. Some Manchukuoan pilots were also given kamikaze training and at least one downed a B-29 by crashing a Ki-27 into it. By the time the Manchurian Strategic Offensive Operation was launched by the Soviet Red Army in August 1945, the Manchukuo Air Force had practically ceased to exist, although there were isolated incidents of Manchukuoan planes attacking Soviet aircraft.

== Organization ==
Three fighters squadrons were formed in 1942 from flying school cadets, with the typical strength of a squadron being as follows: 11 officers, 12 to 14 non-commissioned officers, and 90 enlisted men.

The organization of the air force in 1941 was as follows:

- 1st Air Unit (Xinjing)
- 2nd Air Unit (Fengtian)
- 3rd Air Unit (Harbin)
- Tongliao Independent Air Unit
- Flying School

=== List of aircraft ===
An aircraft construction industry existed in Manchukuo. It produced Nakajima Ki-27 fighters, among others, although the majority of them went to the Japanese air services rather than the Manchukuoan Air Force. The Manchukuoans had the following aircraft:

Aircraft	Origin	Type	Variant	In service	Notes
Combat Aircraft
Nakajima Type 91	Japan	fighter	II	129	
Nakajima Ki-27	Japan	fighter		12	
Nakajima Ki-43	Japan	fighter		4	Delivered in 1945. Ki-43-II Ko Variant.
Nakajima LB-2	Japan	medium bomber		1	A converted experimental craft from the Manchukuo National Airways
Kawasaki Ki-32	Japan	light bomber		1+	
Kawasaki Type 88	Japan	light bomber/Reconnaissance		230	
Mitsubishi Ki-30	Japan	light bomber		1+	
Mitsubishi Ki-21	Japan	bomber		6	
2F BXN2 Gamma	United States	bomber	2E	25	
Transport
Tachikawa Ki-54	Japan	transport		1+	
Trainer
Tachikawa Ki-9	Japan	trainer		59	
Tachikawa Ki-55	Japan	advanced trainer		1+	

== See also ==
- Manchukuo Imperial Navy
- Manchukuo Imperial Guard

== Sources ==
=== References ===
- Jowett, Philipp (2004). Rays of the Rising Sun, Volume 1: Japan's Asian Allies 1931–45, China and Manchukuo. Helion and Company Ltd. ISBN 1-874622-21-3.
