= Small nucleolar RNA R38 =

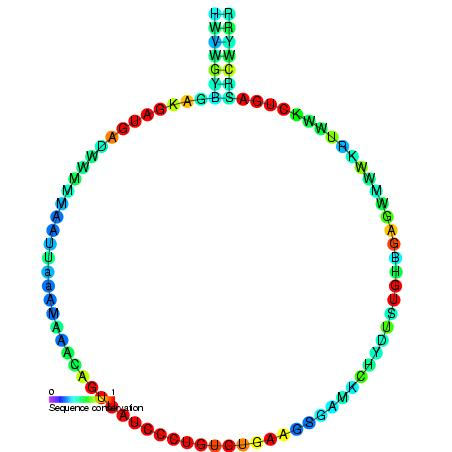
- Predicted secondary structure and sequence conservation of snoR38

Identifiers
- Symbol: snoR38
- Rfam: RF00213

Other data
- RNA type: Gene; snRNA; snoRNA; CD-box
- Domain: Eukaryota
- GO: GO:0006396 GO:0005730
- SO: SO:0000593
- PDB structures: PDBe

In molecular biology, Small nucleolar RNA R38 is a non-coding RNA (ncRNA) molecule which functions in the modification of other small nuclear RNAs (snRNAs). This type of modifying RNA is usually located in the nucleolus of the eukaryotic cell which is a major site of snRNA biogenesis. It is known as a small nucleolar RNA (snoRNA) and also often referred to as a guide RNA. snoRNA R38 belongs to the C/D box class of snoRNAs which contain the conserved sequence motifs known as the C box (UGAUGA) and the D box (CUGA). Most of the members of the box C/D family function in directing site-specific 2'-O-methylation of substrate RNAs. snoRNA R38 has been identified in human, yeast, Arabidopsis thaliana and Oryza sativa . snoRNA R38 guides the methylation of 2'-O-ribose sites in 28S rRNA.
