= Tachikawa Ki-77 =

Japanese experimental long-range aircraft

Ki-77
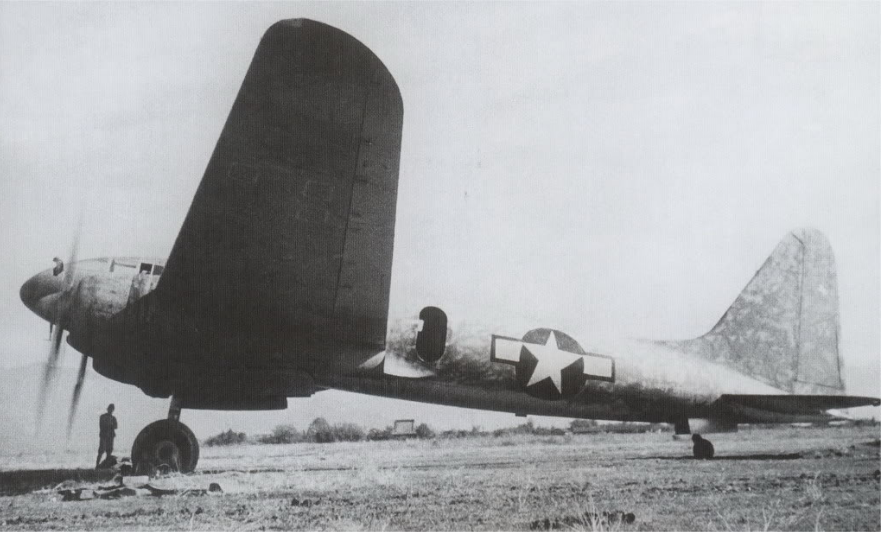
- Tachikawa Ki-77 in U.S. markings, 1945

General information
- Type: Long-range experimental aircraft
- National origin: Japan
- Manufacturer: Tachikawa Aircraft Company
- Primary user: Imperial Japanese Army Air Service
- Number built: 2

History
- First flight: 18 November 1942
- Retired: 1945

The Tachikawa Ki-77 was a Japanese very long-range experimental transport and communications aircraft of World War II derived from a design commissioned by a newspaper to break the flight distance record set by a rival. It was a low-wing cabin monoplane with twin piston engines and a tailwheel undercarriage.

== Development ==
The Ki-77 was the Japanese Army Air Force designation for the A-26, a clean, slim low-wing, twin-engine monoplane intended for an endurance flight between New York and Tokyo. The A stood for the name of the sponsor, a newspaper Asahi Shimbun which was vying for records with a rival paper that had sponsored the Mitsubishi Ki-15 Kamikaze flight to the United Kingdom in 1937. 26 was for the 26th century of the Japanese Imperial Dynasty - 1940 was year 2600 in the Japanese calendar.

The Ki-77's overall design was developed under the aegis of Hidemasa Kimura of the Aeronautical Research Institute of the University of Tokyo, with Tachikawa Aircraft Company being responsible for manufacturing and detail drafting work. The aircraft's layout was finalized in autumn of 1940 with its first flight originally expected in late 1941, but this was canceled with the start of war against the United States and consequent reallocation of priorities. The Ki-77 design included a number of novel features, including a high aspect ratio laminar flow wing for reduced drag, a sealed but unpressurized cabin to reduce the need for oxygen masks at its intended operating altitude, and special low drag cowlings.

== Flight from Japan to Germany ==
In July 1942, the crew of an Italian Savoia-Marchetti SM.75GA established the first wartime air link between European Axis states and Japan – taking a great circle route (i.e. the shortest possible) from Axis-occupied western Russia, over Siberia and China. While the Japanese leadership saw the importance of reciprocating, General Tojo opposed using a covert great circle route to Europe, because Japan was not at war with the Soviet Union and wished to avoid provoking it. (Likewise, a more northerly route, over the Arctic, would have passed close to US airbases in Alaska.) Hence, a longer route, in excess of 10,000 km (5,400 nautical miles) – from Southeast Asia, over the Indian Ocean and Middle East, into Eastern Europe – was planned, under the codename "Seiko" ("Success").

Development work on the A-26/Ki-77 project was restarted, after it was chosen as the aircraft for "Seiko". The first prototype flew on 18 November 1942; it suffered from persistent oil cooling problems. While these were solved, the first prototype required many changes and reworking, delaying further flights (until July 1943). In the meantime, a second prototype was completed by Tachikawa, integrating the new specifications.

Colonel Shogu Saigo, a General Staff officer involved in liaison with German forces, stated later that, in advance, he had privately considered the "Seiko" mission absurd and unlikely to succeed. The aircrew was to be Juukou Nagatomo (pilot), Hajime Kawasaki (co-pilot), Kenji Tsukagoshi and Noriyoshi Nagata (flight engineers), and Motohiko Kawashima (radio operator). Three Imperial Japanese Army staff officers, two of whom were military attachés, were to be passengers. Given the possibility of capture, the crew carried poison, with which they intended to suicide.

On 30 June 1943, the Ki-77 departed Japan for Singapore, where the runway had to be lengthened by 1,000 metres, to assure a safe take-off with the weight of eight tonnes of fuel required to reach Europe. With an intended destination of the German airfield at Sarabus (later Hvardiiske), Crimea, the "Seiko" mission departed Singapore at 07:10 on 7 July 1943. The Ki-77 disappeared, fate unknown, somewhere over the Indian Ocean. A catastrophic mechanical problem may have occurred, or the Ki-77 may have been intercepted by British Commonwealth fighter aircraft. It became known post-war that British intelligence was aware in advance of the mission and its route (via air grid squares 3420, 2560 and 2510), as a result of the ULTRA signals decryption project at Bletchley Park, which decoded German radio communications advising Sarabus of the projected arrival of the Ki-77. Relatively slow, unarmed and unarmoured, the Ki-77 would have been extremely vulnerable to interception

== Endurance record flight ==
Japan carried out a second flight to gain an endurance record and to verify the Ki-77's capabilities. The existing record had been held by Italy's Savoia-Marchetti SM.75GA since 1939.

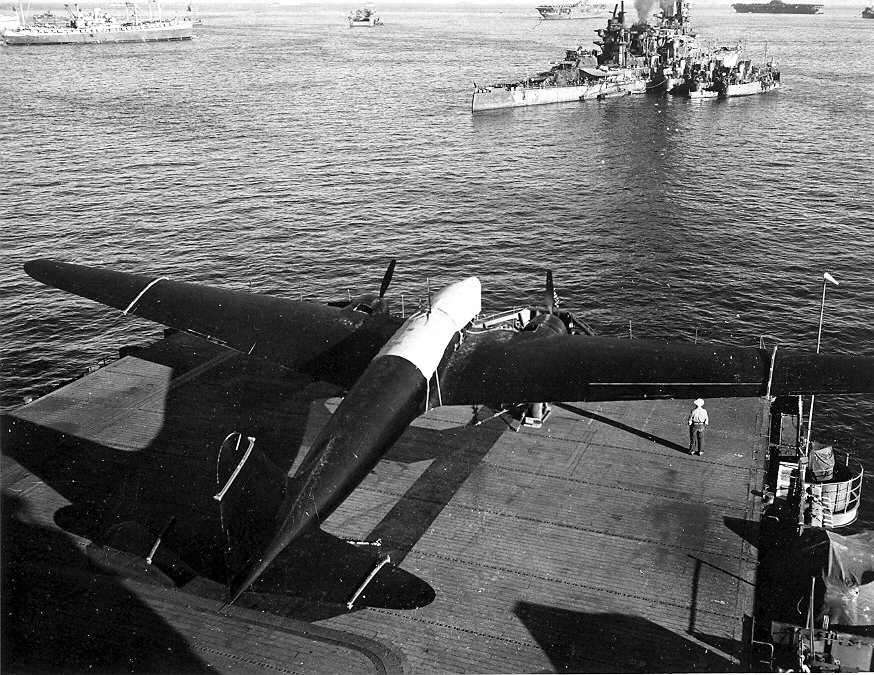
Captured Ki-77 aboard USS Bogue

Even if the usefulness of record breaking flights was overshadowed in 1944 by the necessities of war, the Japanese needed a propaganda coup and the surviving Ki-77 was available. On 2 July it flew 19 circuits over a triangular route off Manchuria, landing 57 hours 9 minutes later and covering 16,435 km (10,212 mi) at an average speed of 288.2 km/h (179.1 mph), 3,499 km (2,174 mi) more than the SM.75's 12,936 km (8,038 mi) record. The Ki-77 landed with 800 liters remaining in the tanks of the 12,200 L (2,700 imp gal; 3,200 US gal) it began with, so the maximum endurance was around 18,000 km (11,000 mi). The Ki-77's endurance record was first exceeded in October 1946 by a Lockheed P2V-1 Neptune in a flight from Perth, Australia to Columbus, Ohio in the American midwest, of over 18,083.6 km (11,236.6 mi).

The distance record Ki-77 aircraft was still in existence when Japan surrendered and was shipped to the United States aboard the United States Navy escort carrier USS Bogue from Yokosuka in December 1945, arriving at Alameda, California on 8 January 1946 for examination before being scrapped.

== Operator ==
Japan
Imperial Japanese Army Air Service

== Specifications (Tachikawa Ki-77) ==
Data from Japanese Aircraft of the Pacific War

General characteristics

- Crew: 5
- Length: 15.3 m (50 ft 2 in)
- Wingspan: 29.438 m (96 ft 7 in)
- Height: 3.85 m (12 ft 8 in)
- Wing area: 79.56 m^{2} (856.4 sq ft)
- Empty weight: 7,237 kg (15,955 lb)
- Gross weight: 16,725 kg (36,872 lb)
- Fuel capacity: 11,155 L (2,454 imp gal)
- Powerplant: 2 × Nakajima Ha-115 14-cyl two-row air-cooled radial piston engines, 870 kW (1,170 hp) each for take-off
  - 745.7 kW (1,000 hp) at 4,300 m (14,108 ft)
- Propellers: 3-bladed metal constant speed propellers

Performance

- Maximum speed: 440 km/h (270 mph, 240 kn) at 4,600 m (15,092 ft)
- Cruise speed: 300 km/h (190 mph, 160 kn)
- Range: 18,000 km (11,000 mi, 9,700 nmi)
- Service ceiling: 8,700 m (28,500 ft)
- Time to altitude: 6,000 m (19,685 ft) in 24 minutes
- Wing loading: 210.2 kg/m^{2} (43.1 lb/sq ft)
- Power/mass: 0.104 kW/kg (0.063 hp/lb)

== See also ==
- Messerschmitt Me 261 Adolfine
