= Tachihi R-53 =

Japanese aircraft

R-53
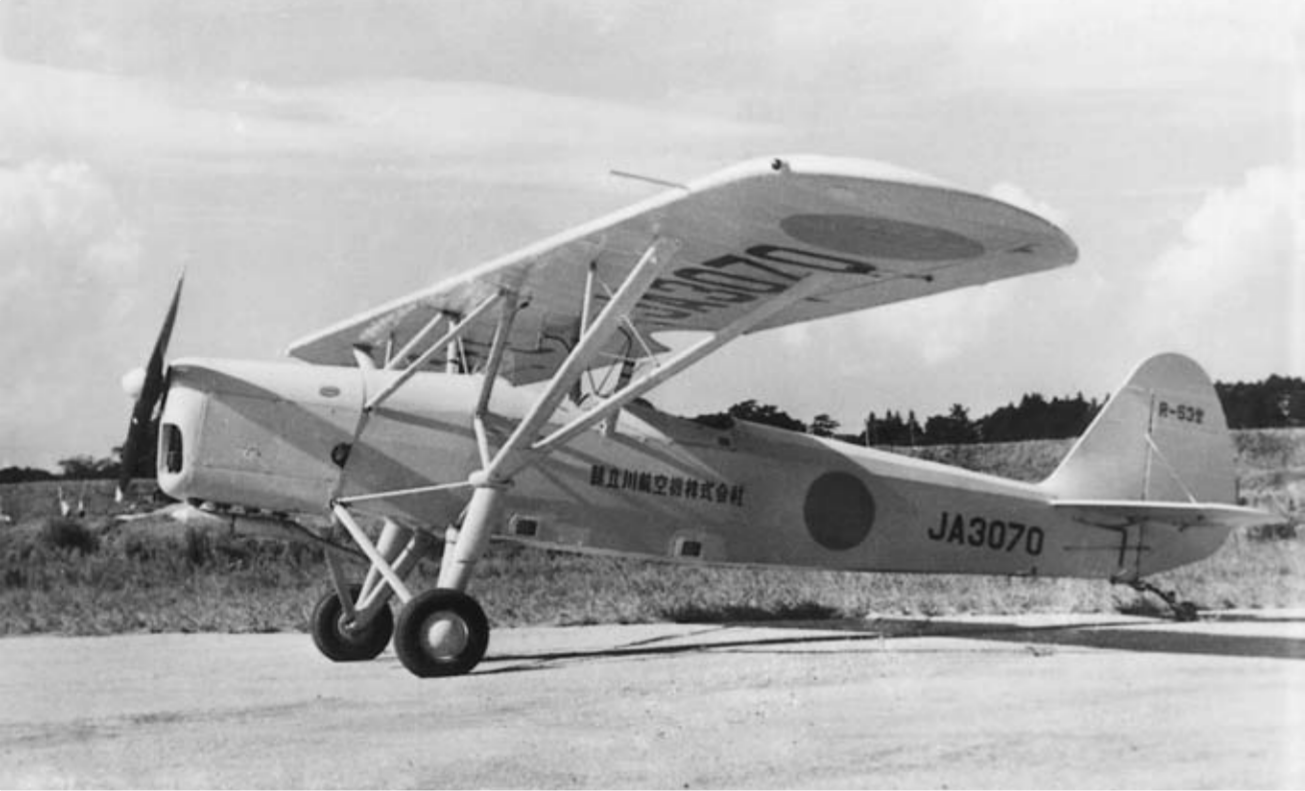

General information
- Type: Two seat training aircraft
- National origin: Japan
- Manufacturer: Tachikawa Aircraft Company
- Number built: 1

History
- First flight: Winter 1952-3

The Tachihi R-53 was amongst the first aircraft built in Japan after the relaxation of the ban imposed at the end of World War II. It is a parasol-wing, two seat, training aircraft powered by a British engine. Only one was produced.

== Design and development ==
From the end of World War II until the passage of the Air Law in July 1952, aircraft manufacture in Japan was forbidden. The Tachihi R-52, the R-53's immediate predecessor, was the first post-war Japanese aircraft built with local materials and powered by a Japanese engine. It flew in September 1952, soon followed by the similar but Blackburn Cirrus Major powered R-53.

The R-53 is a parasol-wing monoplane. In plan its wing is unswept and has constant chord, with no flaps or leading edge slots; it is built around two spars made from Japanese cypress, with duralumin ribs and fabric covering. On each side there are two sets of wing struts to transfer loads to the fuselage, one an unequal length and angle X-form pair from the lower fuselage longerons to the wing spars, the other pair cabane struts from the upper fuselage to the wing centre section, leaning together. The fuselage has a welded steel tube frame, fabric covered, with rounded upper decking. There are two tandem open cockpits, one below the wing trailing edge and the other below mid-chord. The tailplane is attached to the top of the fuselage, with a trim tab on the elevator; the fin and rudder are curved, the fin extended forward by a lengthy fillet.

The R-53 is powered by a 155 hp (116 kW) Blackburn Cirrus Major four-cylinder inverted inline engine, distinguishing it from the short-nosed radial engine installation on the R-52. It has a fixed conventional undercarriage with mainwheels fitted with brakes on independent hinged V-form legs with oil spring shock absorbers in separate, more upright, struts from the X-intersection of the wing struts, made more rigid by a secondary strut to mid-fuselage. The tail wheel is steel sprung and steerable.

The first flight date of the R-53 is not precisely known, but it followed that of the R-52 (September 1952) and it was flying by April 1953. The prototype JA3070 is the only one of its type recorded on the Japanese register before late 1955 so probably the only one built. This aircraft is now restored and displayed in Tachihi's real estate office in Tokyo, although not in airworthy condition.

== Specifications ==
Data from Jane's All the World's Aircraft 1956/57

General characteristics

- Crew: Two
- Length: 7.55 m (24 ft 9 in)
- Wingspan: 10.7 m (35 ft 1 in)
- Height: 2.65 m (8 ft 8 in)
- Wing area: 17.3 m^{2} (186 sq ft)
- Aspect ratio: 6.62
- Airfoil: NACA 23012
- Empty weight: 668 kg (1,473 lb)
- Gross weight: 950 kg (2,094 lb)
- Fuel capacity: 140 L (30.8 Imp gal; 37.0 US gal)
- Powerplant: 1 × Blackburn Cirrus Major 4-cylinder inverted inline, 116 kW (155 hp)
- Propellers: 2-bladed, 2.04 m (6 ft 8 in) diameter wooden, fixed pitch

Performance

- Maximum speed: 208 km/h (129 mph, 112 kn)
- Cruise speed: 145 km/h (90 mph, 78 kn)
- Stall speed: 79 km/h (49 mph, 43 kn)
- Range: 750 km (470 mi, 400 nmi)
- Service ceiling: 4,350 m (14,270 ft)
- Take-off distance to clear 15 m (50 ft): 420 m (1,383 ft)
- Landing distance from 15 m (50 ft): 466 m (1,530 ft
