= Oil drum =

Oil drum may refer to:

- Drum (container), a cylindrical container used for transporting bulk goods such as oil and fuel
- The Oil Drum, an energy discussion website
