= Tachikawa Ki-55 =

Japanese military trainer aircraft

Ki-55
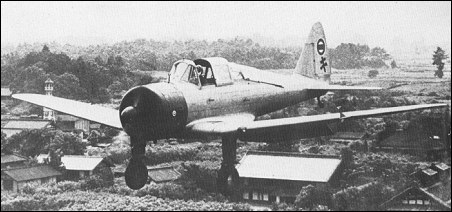

General information
- Type: Military advanced training aircraft
- Manufacturer: Tachikawa Aircraft Company
- Primary users: Imperial Japanese Army Air Force Royal Thai Air Force
- Number built: 1,389

History
- Manufactured: 1940 - 1943
- First flight: September 1939
- Retired: 1945 (Japan); 1953 (China)
- Developed from: Tachikawa Ki-36

The Tachikawa Ki-55 (Allied reporting name Ida) is a Japanese advanced trainer.

== Design and development ==
The excellent characteristics of the Tachikawa Ki-36 made it potentially ideal as a trainer. This led to the development of the Ki-55. The main differences were the installation of dual controls for the instructor at the rear seat. Unnecessary equipment was removed, such as armament, radio and radio mast, bomb racks and the fuselage side observation windows. The wheel spats would often be removed as well, but not always.

After successful testing of a prototype in September 1939, the type was put into production as the Tachikawa Army Type 99 Advanced Trainer.

In all, 1,389 Ki-55 were constructed before production ended in December 1943 - with Tachikawa having built 1078 and Kawasaki 311.

Both the Ki-55 and the Ki-36 were given the Allied reporting name Ida.

== Operators ==
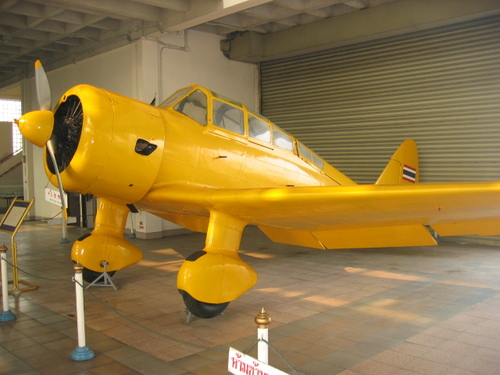
Tachikawa Ki-55 trainer at the Royal Thai Air Force Museum

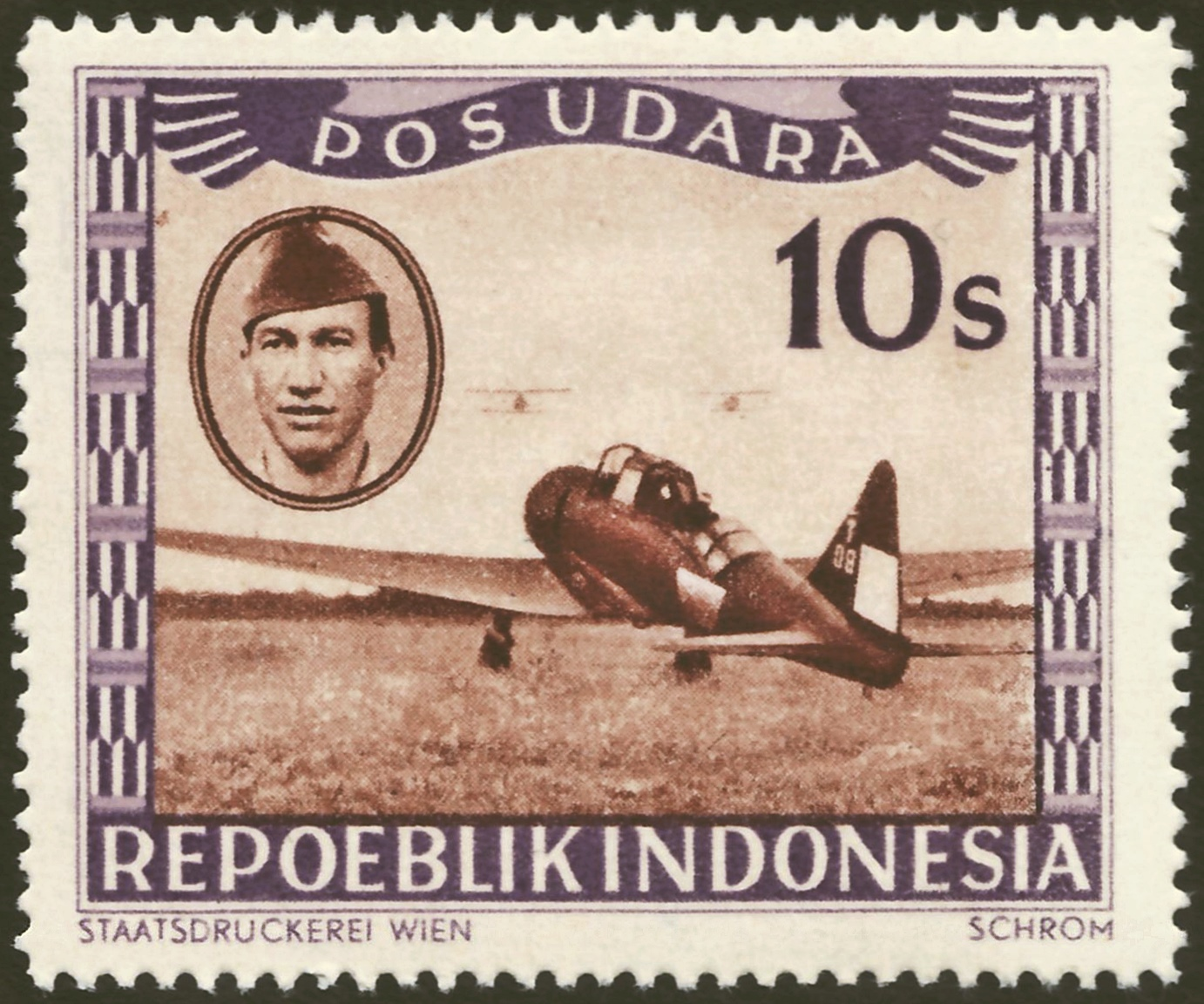
A 1948 Indonesian stamp featuring Ki-55

Japan

- Imperial Japanese Army Air Force
- Kumagaya Army Flying School
- Mito Army Flying School
- Tachiarai Army Flying School
- Utsonomiya Army Flying School

Manchukuo

- Manchukuo Air Force

Reorganized National Government of China

- National Government of China Air Force received several from the Japanese.

Republic of China

- Republic of China Air Force operated captured aircraft.

China

- People's Liberation Army Air Force operated more than 30 captured aircraft at the end of 1945. These Ki-55s were used until the last 14 retired in 1953.

Indonesia

- Indonesian Air Force (then called Indonesian People's Security Force)

Thailand

- Royal Thai Air Force purchased 24 machines in 1942 and operated them under the designation B.F.6 (Thai: บ.ฝ.๖). These aircraft were in service until 1950.

Francillon also mentions delivery to the Japanese satellite air force of Cochinchina, the southernmost third part of present Vietnam

== Surviving aircraft ==
Two aircraft have survived.

- A Ki-55 is on display at the Royal Thai Air Force Museum in Bangkok, Thailand.
- A Ki-55, numbered 103, is on display at the Military Museum of the Chinese People's Revolution in Beijing, China.

== Specifications (Ki-55) ==
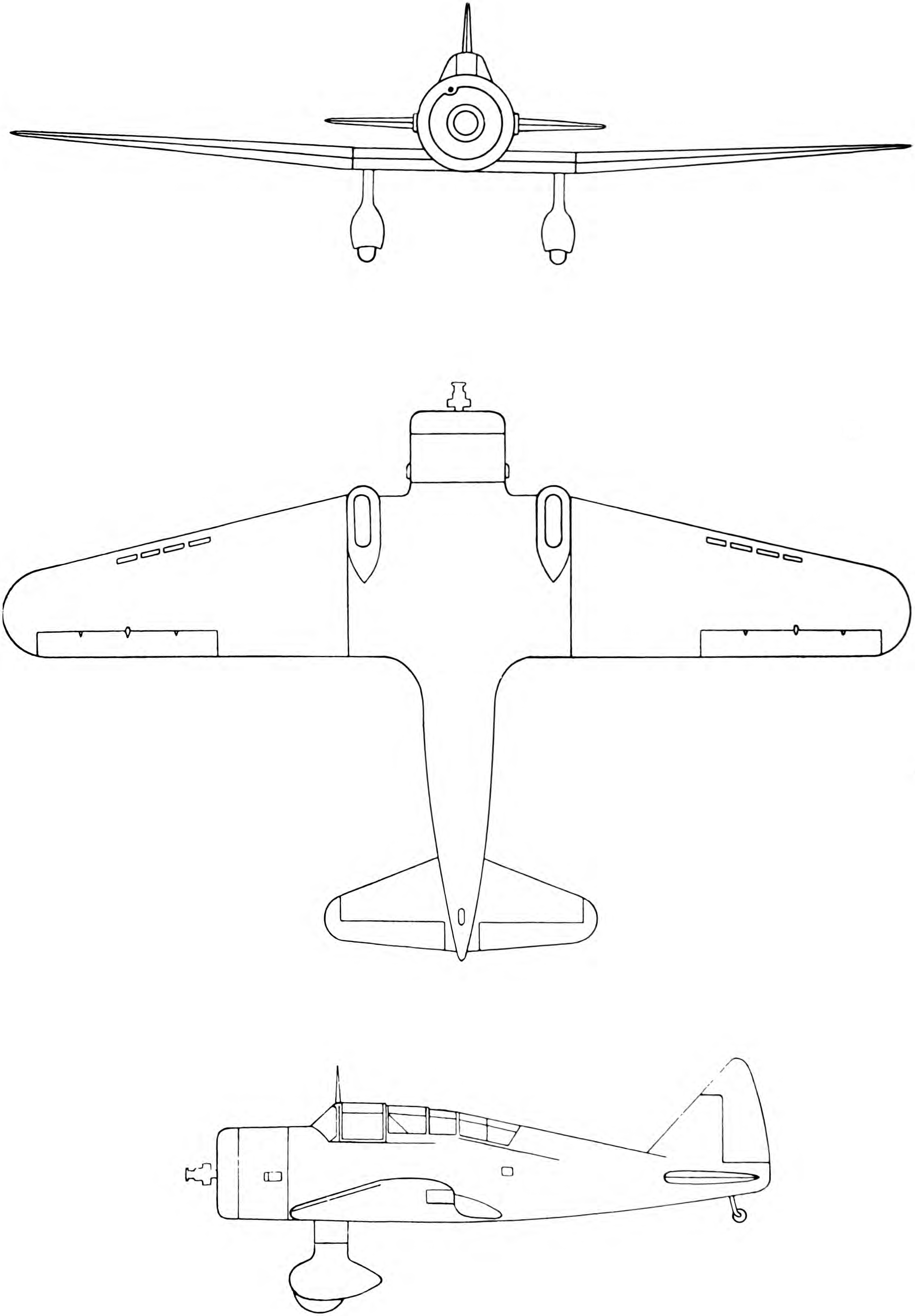
3-view drawing of the Tachikawa Ki-55

Data from Japanese Aircraft of the Pacific War

General characteristics

- Crew: 2
- Length: 8 m (26 ft 3 in)
- Wingspan: 11.8 m (38 ft 9 in)
- Height: 3.64 m (11 ft 11 in)
- Wing area: 20 m^{2} (220 sq ft)
- Airfoil: root: NACA 23014; tip: NACA 23006
- Empty weight: 1,292 kg (2,848 lb)
- Gross weight: 1,721 kg (3,794 lb)
- Powerplant: 1 × Hitachi Ha13a (Army Type 98 450hp Air Cooled Radial) 9-cylinder air-cooled radial piston engine, 380 kW (510 hp) for take-off

350 kW (470 hp) at 1,700 m (5,600 ft)

- Propellers: 2-bladed metal propeller

Performance

- Maximum speed: 349 km/h (217 mph, 188 kn) at 2,200 m (7,200 ft)
- Cruise speed: 235 km/h (146 mph, 127 kn)
- Range: 1,060 km (660 mi, 570 nmi)
- Service ceiling: 8,200 m (26,900 ft)
- Time to altitude: 3,000 m (9,800 ft) in 6 minutes 55 seconds
- Wing loading: 86.1 kg/m^{2} (17.6 lb/sq ft)
- Power/mass: 0.222 kW/kg (0.135 hp/lb)

== See also ==
Related development

- Tachikawa Ki-36

Related lists

- List of military aircraft of Japan
