= Tachikawa Ki-54 =

Japanese trainer aircraft

Ki-54
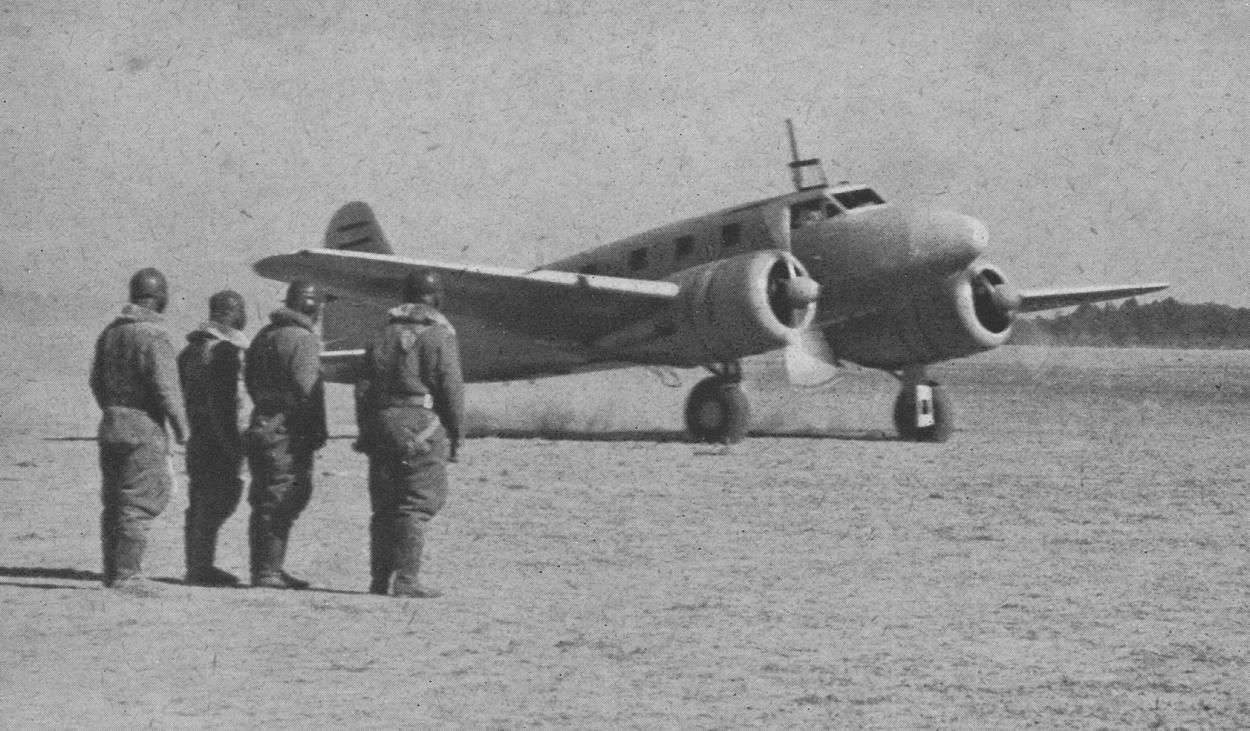
- Tachikawa Ki-54

General information
- Type: Twin-engine advanced crew trainer
- Manufacturer: Tachikawa Aircraft Company Ltd
- Designer: Shinjiro Shinagawa
- Primary user: Imperial Japanese Army Air Service
- Number built: 1,368

History
- Manufactured: 1941-1945
- Introduction date: 1941
- First flight: Summer 1940
- Retired: 1945 (Japan); 1952 (China)

The Tachikawa Ki-54 was a twin-engine advanced trainer designed and produced by the Japanese aviation manufacturer Tachikawa Aircraft Company Ltd. Principally operated by the Imperial Japanese Army Air Service (IJAAS) during World War II, the aircraft was named Hickory by the Allies.

The Ki-54 was developed by Tachikawa between 1939 and 1940 as a twin-engine multirole aircraft that was optimised for the advanced trainer role. The prototype made its maiden flight in the summer of 1940; after completing service trials, the type entered production in 1941 as the Army Type 1 Advanced Trainer Model A (Ki-54a). This initial model was promptly followed by the Ki-54b as the Army Type 1 Operations Trainer Model B and Ki-54c as the Army Type 1 Transport Model C. Several other variants, such as the all-wooden Ki-110 and the Ki-54D Army Type 1 Patrol Bomber Model D were also produced in limited numbers, while further models were proposed. The type was used extensively and in various capacities throughout World War II by the IJAAS. Both production and IJAAS use of the Ki-54 was terminated in 1945. Following the Surrender of Japan, several abandoned and captured aircraft were flown in limited numbers by various operators, including the People's Liberation Army Air Force and Armée de l'Air.

== Design and development ==
The origins of the Ki-54 can be traced back to late 1939, when the Koku Hombu (Note: Koku Hombu was the Technical Branch of the Imperial Army Air Headquarters.) requested the Tachikawa Aircraft Company Ltd to produce a new twin-engined aircraft suitable for both the trainer role and multiple other purposes. One of the requirements of this new aircraft was for its handling to accurately replicate that of contemporary twin-engined bombers then in service with the Imperial Japanese Army Air Service (IJAAS); it was to be suitable for the training of various bomber crew positions, including those of the pilot, bombardier, navigator, gunner, and radio operator. The company's design team, headed by Ryokichi Endo, opted for a low-mounted wing configuration paired with a retractable undercarriage and a pair of Hitachi Ha13a radial engines fitted with variable-pitch propellers.

In the summer of 1940, the prototype Ki-54 performed its maiden flight. During early flight testing, the aircraft exhibited a tendency to be nose-heavy during landings, thus minor modifications were performed to correct this. In 1941, the aircraft went into quantity production as the Army Type 1 Advanced Trainer Model A. It was followed by the Army Type 1 Operations Trainer Model B, which featured full provisions for the training of bomber crews (including four gunnery stations). It would be the most numerous version of the aircraft, being supplied to all of the Imperial Japanese Army's (IJA) multi-engined training schools and communications schools, as well as to numerous civil training schools that had been contracted by the IJA.

The Army Type 1 Transport Model C was a variant oriented towards light transport and communications duties, featuring a smoothed exterior and seated up to eight personnel. The Ki-54C would be further adapted into the Y-59, for civil operators, and the Ki-110, which was constructed primarily out of wood wherever possible as an economy measure. A separate variant, the Ki-54D or Army Type 1 Patrol Bomber Model D, was produced in small number for anti-submarine patrol duties, armed with eight depth charges.

== Operators ==
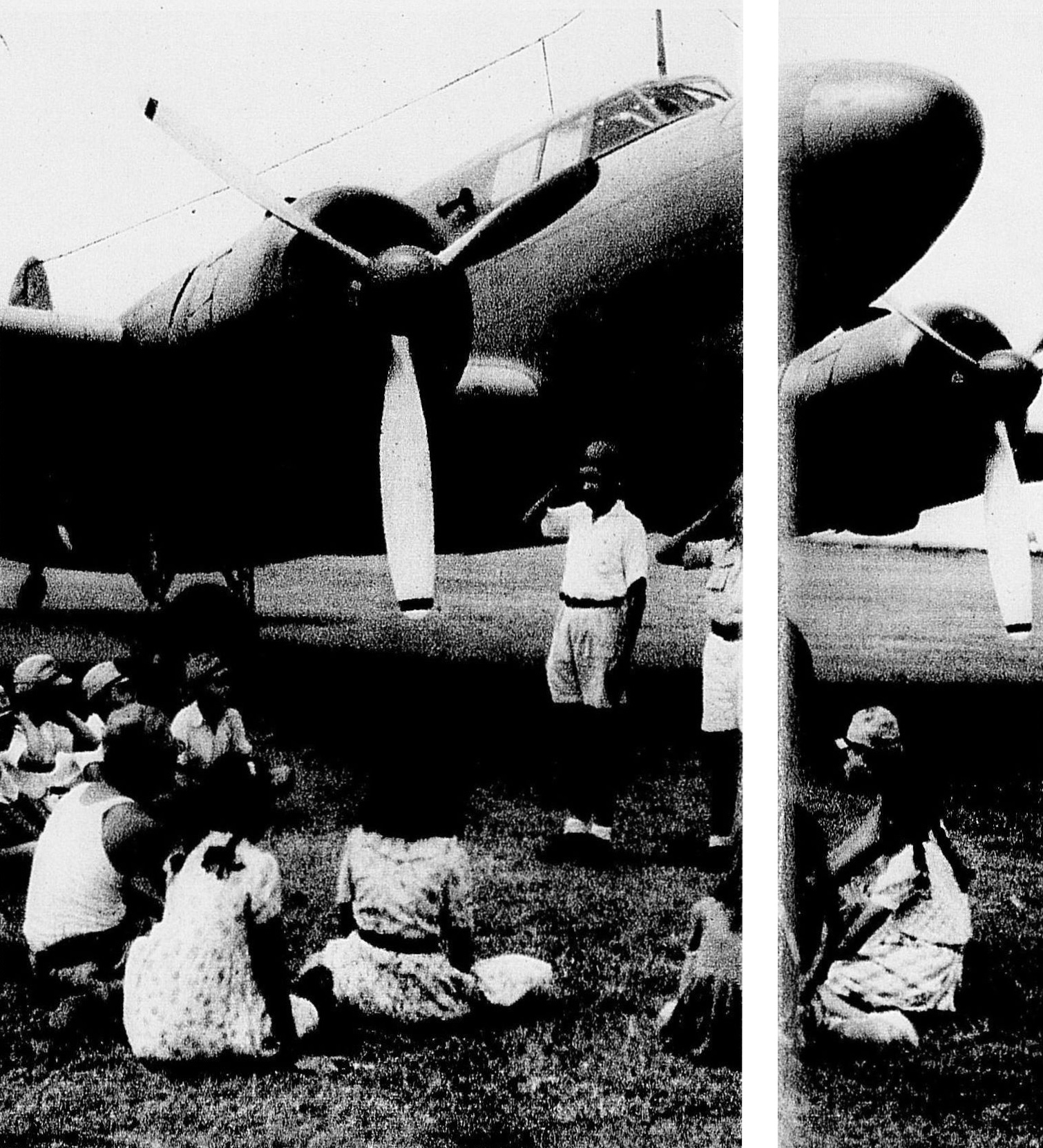
A Ki-54 on the ground, 1943

Japan

- Imperial Japanese Army Air Service used them for training as per their design.

Manchukuo

- Manchukuo Air Force Three were provided by Japan as VIP transports.

China-Nanjing

- Nanjing Air Force

China

- Republic of China Air Force Nationalist Chinese (captured).

China

- People's Liberation Army Air Force Communist Chinese (captured): Four captured Ki-54s were used, including in 1951 to train the first class of female pilots in China. They were retired in 1952.

French Indochina

- Armée de l'Air At least seven Ki-54 were recovered by the French in French Indochina between 1945 and 1947, after the Japanese surrender.

United Kingdom

- One aircraft operated briefly by No. 273 Squadron RAF during September and October 1945 in French Indochina.

== Variants ==
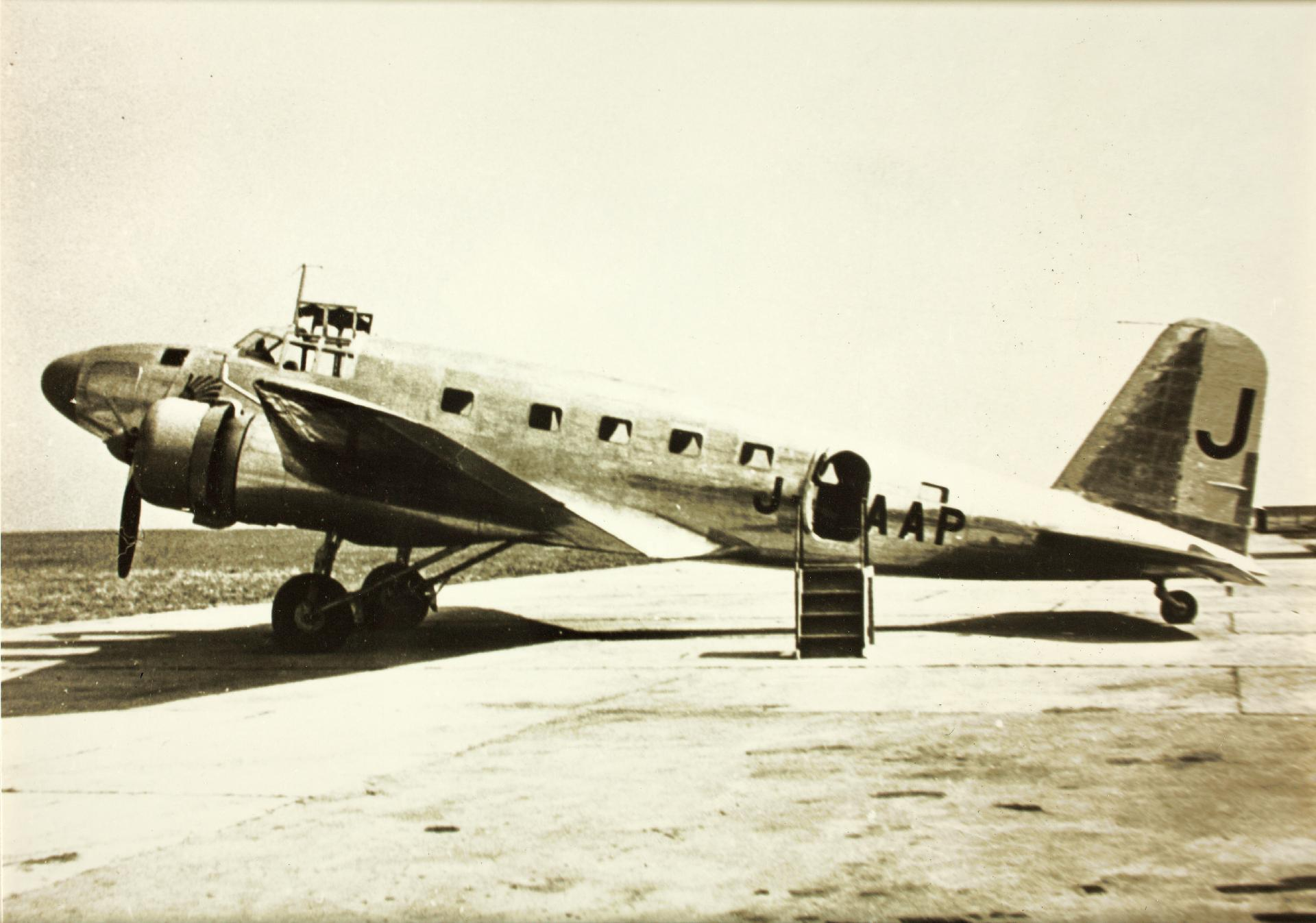
Ki-54

Ki-54a
unarmed pilot trainer
Ki-54b
armed crew trainer
Ki-54c
eight-passenger light transport, communications aircraft. Civil designation Y-59.
Ki-54d
maritime reconnaissance/ASW, carried 8x 60-kg (132-lb) depth charges
Ki-110
one prototype Ki-54c of all-wood construction, destroyed in US bombing attack
Ki-111
projected fuel tanker (none built)
Ki-114
projected fuel tanker of all-wood construction (none built)

== Surviving aircraft ==
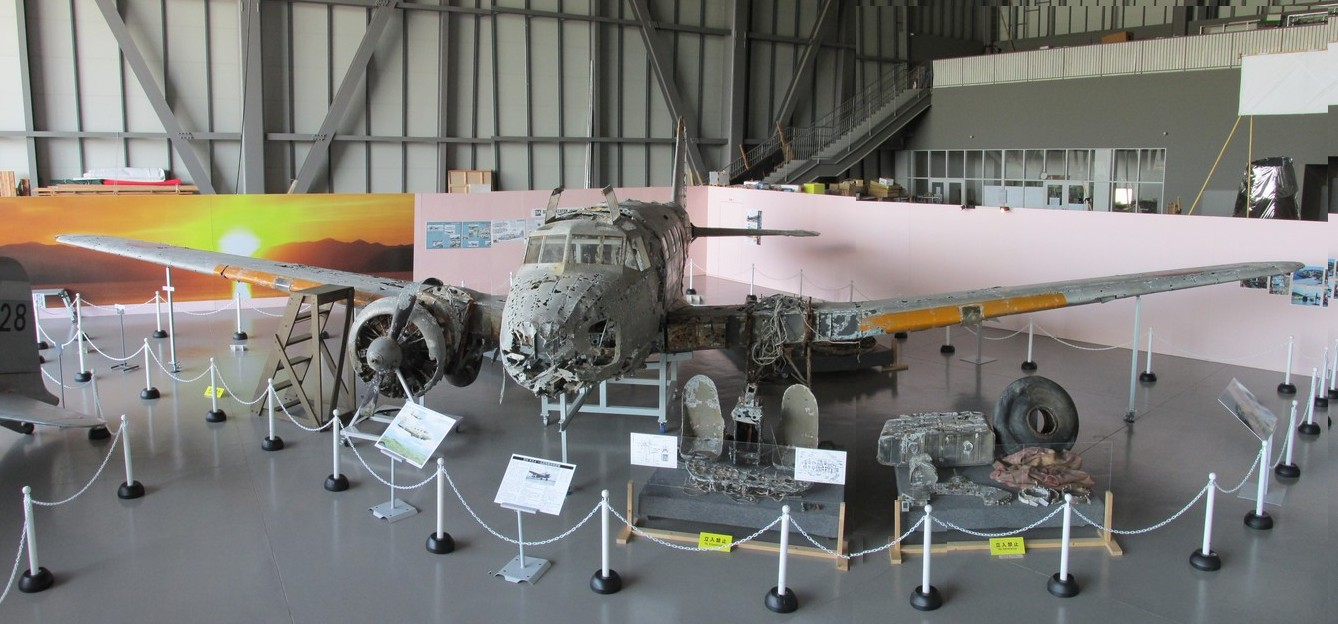
Ki-54 at the Misawa Aviation & Science Museum

- A Ki-54 fuselage is in Australia in storage at the Australian War Museum Annex. It was previously part of a playground at the RAAF Fairbairn base kindergarten.
- Another Ki-54 fuselage is stored in China at the Chinese Aviation Museum.
- A nearly intact Ki-54 is proposed to be restored by Tachichi Holdings, the successor to the aircraft's manufacturer. It was found at the bottom of Lake Towada in Aomori Prefecture on 13 August 2010 and recovered on 5 September 2012. It was preserved for display at the Misawa Aviation & Science Museum in the damaged state it was found. It remained at that museum until 2020 when it was given to Tachichi Holdings for a proposed restoration. The aircraft was briefly on display in 2022 in Tokyo in the same condition as it was in Misawa.

== Specifications (Ki-54c light transport) ==
Data from The Concise Guide to Axis Aircraft of World War II; Japanese Aircraft of the Pacific War

General characteristics

- Crew: 2
- Capacity: 8
- Length: 11.94 m (39 ft 2 in)
- Wingspan: 17.9 m (58 ft 9 in)
- Height: 3.58 m (11 ft 9 in)
- Wing area: 40 m^{2} (430 sq ft)
- Empty weight: 2,954 kg (6,512 lb)
- Gross weight: 3,897 kg (8,591 lb)
- Powerplant: 2 × Hitachi Ha13a (Army Type 98 450hp Air Cooled Radial) nine-cylinder air-cooled radial piston engine, 380 kW (510 hp) each for take-off

350 kW (470 hp) at 1,700 m (5,600 ft)

- Propellers: 2-bladed metal propeller

Performance

- Maximum speed: 375 km/h (233 mph, 202 kn)
- Cruise speed: 240 km/h (150 mph, 130 kn)
- Range: 960 km (600 mi, 520 nmi)
- Service ceiling: 7,180 m (23,560 ft)
- Wing loading: 97.4 kg/m^{2} (19.9 lb/sq ft)
- Power/mass: 0.195 kW/kg (0.119 hp/lb)

== See also ==
Aircraft of comparable role, configuration, and era

- Airspeed Oxford
- Avro Anson
- Beech Model 18
- Siebel Si 204

Related lists

- List of aircraft of World War II
- List of military aircraft of Japan
