= Tachikawa Ki-9 =

Japanese trainer aircraft

Ki-9
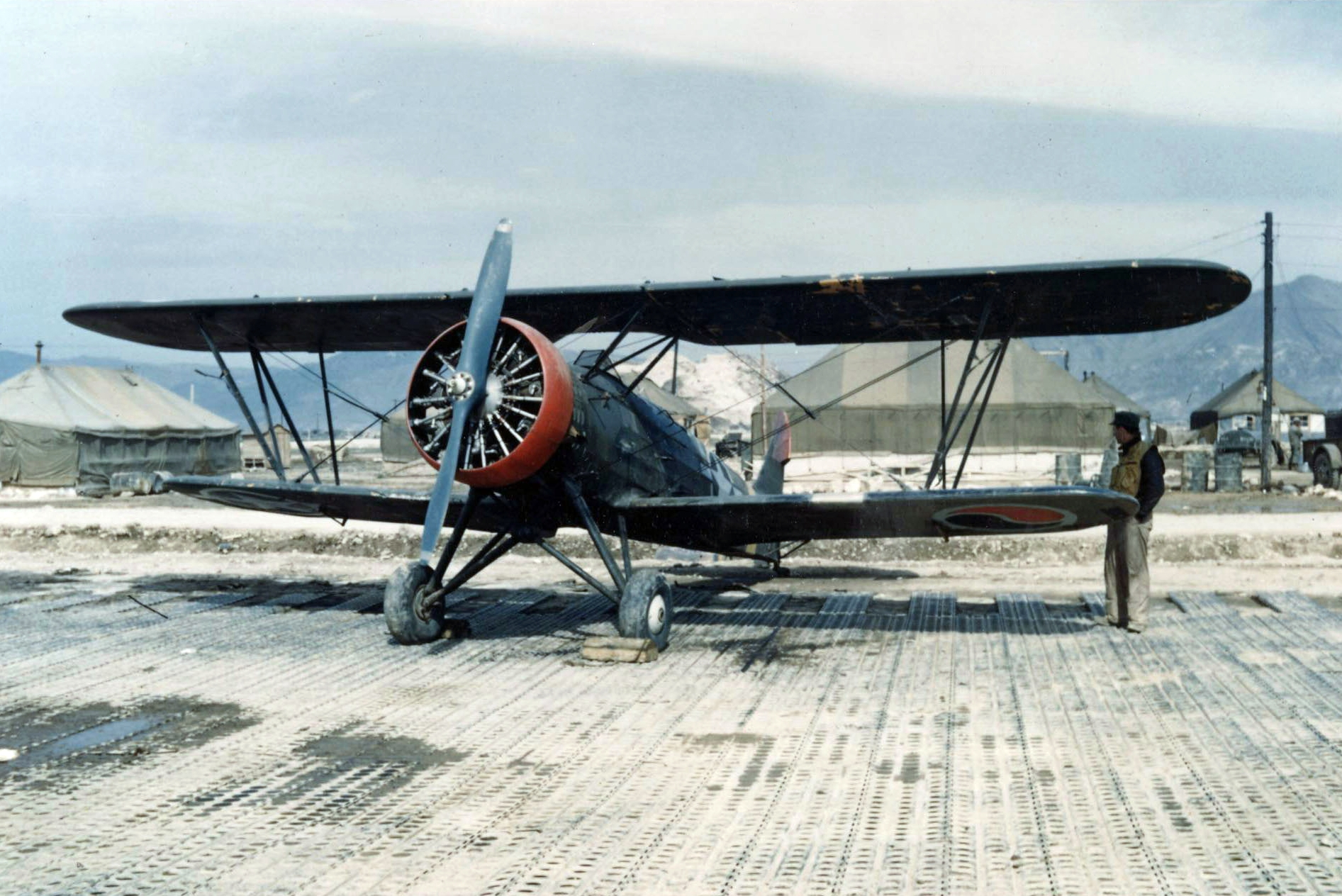
- A former Japanese Tachikawa Ki-9 "Spruce" pictured at airfield K-1 in South Korea in 1951

General information
- Type: Training aircraft
- Manufacturer: Tachikawa Aircraft Company Ltd
- Primary users: Imperial Japanese Army Air Service Reorganized Republic of China Air Force; Manchukuo Air Force; Royal Thai Air Force
- Number built: 2,618

History
- Manufactured: 1934-1945
- Introduction date: 1935
- First flight: 7 January 1935
- Retired: 1951

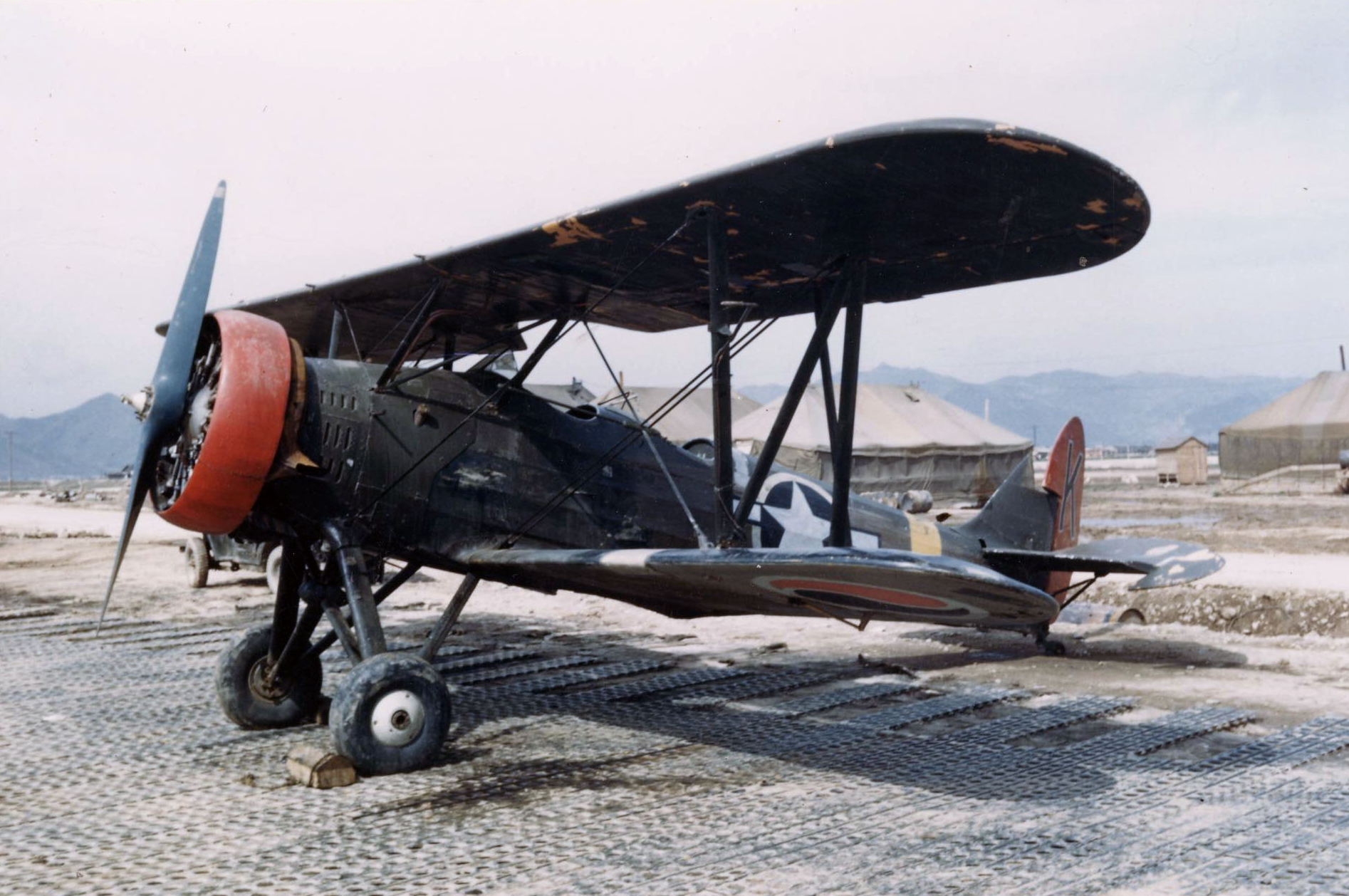
Side view

A Ki-9 of the Reorganized National Government of China Air Force

The Tachikawa Ki-9 (九五式一型練習機, Kyūgo-shiki ichigata renshuki) was an intermediate training aircraft of the Imperial Japanese Army Air Service (IJAAS) designed and produced by the Tachikawa Aircraft Company Ltd. It was known to the Allies under the nickname of "Spruce" during World War II. This aircraft was mistakenly identified as a Tatchikawa by the British.

The Ki-9 was a two-seat, unequal wingspan biplane design. The airframe was intended to be used for both the basic training and intermediate training roles, differentiating the two models only by the use of different engines. The first prototype made its maiden flight on 7 January 1935, powered by a Hitachi Ha-13a nine-cylinder radial engine. However, Tachikawa subsequently developed the dedicated Ki-17 to perform the primary trainer role, leaving the Ki-9 as the intermediate trainer only. In 1935, the first production aircraft was delivered to the IJAAS and entered service as the Army Type 95-1 Medium Grade Trainer Model A that same year. Improved versions, the Army Type 95-1 Model B and the Army Type 95-1 Model C, were subsequently introduced

The Ki-9 was flown extensively by the IJAAS during both the Second Sino-Japanese War and the Pacific War. In the latter stages of World War II, numerous aircraft were used in the kamikaze role. In addition to the IJAAS, the type was also flown by the Reorganized Republic of China Air Force, Manchukuo Air Force and the Royal Thai Air Force.

== Design and development ==
Development of the Ki-9 can be traced back to the R-5 trainer, which had been produced as a private venture by the Tachikawa Aircraft Company Ltd; while this aircraft underwent evaluation by the Imperial Japanese Army Air Service (IJAAS), the service concluded that it was too small to fulfil their requirements. In March 1934, representatives of Tachikawa were invited to meet with the IJAAS' Tokorozawa Army Flying School to discuss the needs of a prospective future training aircraft. Shortly thereafter, the Koku Hombu (Note: Koku Hombu was the Technical Branch of the Imperial Army Air Headquarters.) issued an instruction to the company to design an aircraft that, via the installation of different engines, would be suitable for both the primary trainer and intermediate trainer roles.

In response, Tachikawa put together a design team headed by Ryokichi Endo; the resulting aircraft became, when fitted with the Hitachi Ha-13a nine-cylinder radial engine (capable of producing up to 261 kW (350 hp)) and full instrument flight rules (IFR) instrumentation, a capable intermediate trainer. When powered by the Nakajima NZ seven-cylinder radial engine (capable of 112 hp (80 kW)) and stripped of all unnecessary specialist equipment, this same aircraft was intended to perform the primary trainer role. For the former role, it was required to be capable of reaching 220 kmph (137 mph), have an endurance of at least three hours, and the airframe to be stressed to perform aerobatic manoeuvres of up to 12g. According to the aviation historian René J. Francillon, the company's designers were opposed to the notion of combining the basic and intermediate trainers into a single airframe, and that this direction had been pursued solely at the behest of the Koku Hombu, which had been influenced by overseas developments along these lines and thus insisted on this interchangeability.

During late 1934, the company assembled three prototypes; on 7 January 1935, the first prototype, powered by the Hitachi Ha-13a engine, performed its maiden flight. During this initial flight, the flight controls were found to be quite heavy while the aircraft's agility was underwhelming, partially due to the aircraft's center of gravity being too far forwards, and the undercarriage's shock absorbers were less effective, resulting in a heavy landing. After two days of modifications, the prototype made its second flight to evaluate its stall characteristics, after which it was turned over for service trials. The second prototype, which was identical to the first, followed shortly thereafter. The third prototype, which was representative of the basic trainer configuration, primarily differed from the earlier prototypes by being powered by the Nakajima NZ engine instead. During flight testing, this third prototype exhibited poor handling during take-off, which has been attributed to the airframe's center of gravity being too far rearwards.

Following the service trials, only the intermediate trainer version of the aircraft was accepted for production, receiving the designation Army Type 95-1 Medium Grade Trainer Model A under the IJAAS' naming nomenclature system. Tachikawa continued to develop the type, resulting in successive models being introduced.

== Operational history ==
The Ki-9 was introduced to service as the Army Type 95-1 Medium Grade Trainer Model A under the former aircraft naming nomenclature system. This first production version had a complex, split-axle landing gear with fairings over the top of the wheels. In 1939, this arrangement was modified and simplified, the fuselage slightly shortened, and the total weight reduced. The resulting Army Type 95-1 Model B or Ki-9-kai had improved maneuverability and flight characteristics. This version was quickly superseded by the Army Type 95-1 Model C, or Ki-9-otsu, in full production. Both versions were used widely for blind-flying training with a folding hood over the rear cockpit, and several were modified with a glazed canopy over the rear cockpit for use as a staff officer transport plane.

The Ki-9 was in widespread use through the Second Sino-Japanese War. During the closing months of the Pacific War, numerous Ki-9s were pressed into service for use as "special attack" (kamikaze in American terminology) aircraft. In this capacity, the aircraft was typically fitted with either a 100 kg anti-ship bomb, an oil drum filled with explosives, or fuel in the rear cockpit.

Production by Tachikawa totaled 2,395 aircraft, ending in 1942. At least another 220 Ki-9s were constructed by Tokyo Gasu Denki (also known as Gasuden) from 1943 to 1945.

The Ki-9 was also flown in wartime by Japanese satellite countries and postwar by the fledgling government of Indonesia. Several captured units were also briefly operated by the Republic of China.

== Variants ==
- Ki-9 (Army Type 95-1 Medium Grade Trainer Model A)

Initial version two-seat intermediate trainer aircraft.

- Ki-9-ko (Army Type 95-1 Medium Grade Trainer Model B)

Improved version.

- Ki-9-otsu (Army Type 95-1 Medium Grade Trainer Model C)

Standard production version.

== Operators ==
=== (World War II) ===
Japan

- Imperial Japanese Army Air Service

China-Nanjing

- Reorganized Republic of China Air Force

Manchukuo

- Manchukuo Air Force

Thailand

- Royal Thai Air Force

=== (postwar) ===
Indonesia

- Indonesian Air Force

Republic of China

- Republic of China Air Force

South Korea

- Republic of Korea Air Force

North Korea

- Korean People's Army Air Force

== Specifications (Ki-9 Model A) ==
Data from Japanese Aircraft of the Pacific War

General characteristics

- Crew: 2
- Length: 7.9 m (25 ft 11 in)
- Wingspan: 10.32 m (33 ft 10 in)
- Height: 3.1 m (10 ft 2 in)
- Wing area: 24.5 m^{2} (264 sq ft)
- Empty weight: 1,120 kg (2,469 lb)
- Max takeoff weight: 1,580 kg (3,483 lb)
- Powerplant: 1 × Hitachi Ha13a (Army Type 95 350hp Air Cooled Radial) seven-cylinder air-cooled radial piston engine, 195 kW (261 hp) for take-off
- Propellers: 2-bladed wooden fixed-pitch propeller

Performance

- Maximum speed: 240 km/h (150 mph, 130 kn)
- Cruise speed: 150 km/h (93 mph, 81 kn)
- Endurance: three hours and 30 minutes
- Service ceiling: 5,800 m (19,000 ft)
- Time to altitude: 1,000 m (3,300 ft) in four minutes and 55 seconds
- Wing loading: 58.2 kg/m^{2} (11.9 lb/sq ft)
- Power/mass: 0.18 kW/kg (0.11 hp/lb)

== See also ==
Aircraft of comparable role, configuration, and era

- de Havilland Tiger Moth

Related lists

- List of military aircraft of Japan
