= Tachikawa Ki-17 =

Japanese trainer aircraft

Ki-17
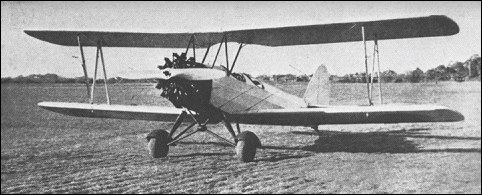
- Tachikawa Ki-17

General information
- Type: Military training aircraft
- Manufacturer: Tachikawa Aircraft Company Ltd
- Primary user: Imperial Japanese Army Air Academy
- Number built: 560

History
- Manufactured: 1936 - 1943
- First flight: July 1935

The Tachikawa Ki-17 (九五式三型練習機, Kyugoshiki san-gata renshuki) was a basic training aircraft of the Imperial Japanese Army Air Force built by Tachikawa Aircraft Company Ltd in the 1930s. It was known to the Allies under the nickname of Cedar during World War II.

== Design and development ==
The Ki-9 was originally planned to be manufactured in two versions using the same basic airframe but with different engines for service as either a primary or intermediate trainer. However, when the lower-powered form proved to be unsuitable due a center of gravity issue, design of a new airframe was ordered for the basic trainer version, and it was given the new designation of Ki-17.

Compared to the Ki-9, the Ki-17 had equal-span wings, a slimmer fuselage, and a revised tailplane. It was powered by a 112 kW (150 hp) Hitachi Ha-13a radial engine. The first prototype flew in July 1935.

The only major change made to subsequent production aircraft was the deletion of the upper-wing ailerons to eliminate oversensitive control inputs.

== Operational history ==
The Ki-17 was introduced to service as the Army Type 95-3 Basic Grade Trainer Model A under the former aircraft naming nomenclature system. Tachikawa manufactured 560 Ki-17s between 1936 and 1943, and the type saw service with the Army Air Academy and flight training schools.

== Operators ==
Japan

- Kumagaya Army Flying Training School
- Mito Army Flying Training School
- Tachiari Army Flying Training School
- Utsonomiya Army Flying Training School
- Imperial Japanese Army Air Force Academy (Rikugun Kōku Shikan Gakkō)

Manchukuo

- Manchukuo Imperial Air Force

Thailand

- Royal Thai Air Force

== Specifications (Ki-17) ==
Data from Japanese Aircraft of the Pacific War

General characteristics

- Crew: 2
- Length: 7.8 m (25 ft 7 in)
- Wingspan: 9.82 m (32 ft 3 in)
- Height: 2.95 m (9 ft 8 in)
- Wing area: 26.02 m^{2} (280.1 sq ft)
- Empty weight: 618 kg (1,362 lb)
- Gross weight: 900 kg (1,984 lb)
- Powerplant: 1 × Hitachi Ha12 (Army Type 95 150hp Air Cooled Radial) 7-cylinder air-cooled radial piston engine, 110 kW (150 hp) for take-off
- Propellers: 2-bladed fixed-pitch wooden propeller

Performance

- Maximum speed: 170 km/h (110 mph, 92 kn)
- Cruise speed: 130 km/h (81 mph, 70 kn)
- Endurance: 3 hours 27 minutes
- Service ceiling: 5,300 m (17,400 ft)
- Wing loading: 34.6 kg/m^{2} (7.1 lb/sq ft)
- Power/mass: 0.125 kW/kg (0.076 hp/lb)

== See also ==
Aircraft of comparable role, configuration, and era

- de Havilland Tiger Moth

Related lists

- List of military aircraft of Japan
