= Kawasaki Ki-32 =

Japanese light bomber

Ki-32
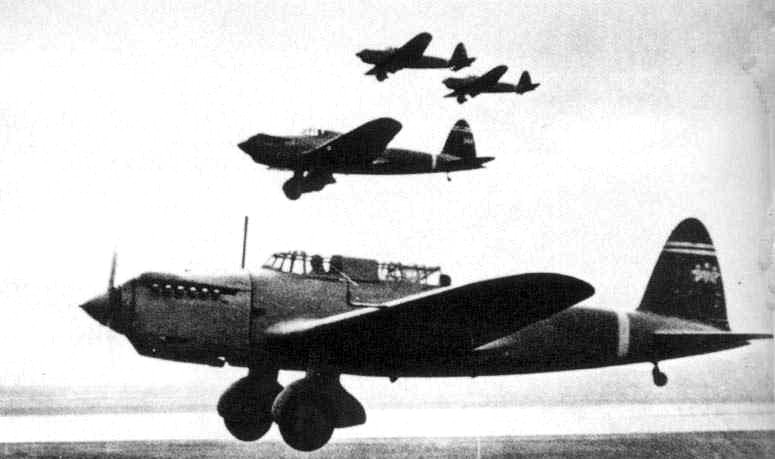
- Ki-32 Mary (Army Type 98 Light Bomber)

General information
- Type: Light bomber
- National origin: Japan
- Manufacturer: Kawasaki Kōkūki Kōgyō K.K.
- Status: Retired
- Primary users: Imperial Japanese Army Air Force Manchukuo Imperial Air Force
- Number built: 854

History
- Introduction date: 1938
- First flight: March 1937
- Retired: 1945

The Kawasaki Ki-32 (九八式軽爆撃機, Kyuhachi-shiki keibakugekiki; lit. ''Type 98 light bomber'') was a Japanese light bomber aircraft of World War II. It was a single-engine, two-seat, mid-wing, cantilever monoplane with a fixed tailwheel undercarriage. An internal bomb bay accommodated a 300 kg (660 lb) offensive load, supplemented by 150 kg (330 lb) of bombs on external racks. During the war, it was known by the Allies by the name Mary. It was, however, mistakenly identified by the British as the Kawasaki Army KB-97 Mary.

== Design and development ==
The Ki-32 was developed in response to a May 1936 Imperial Japanese Army specification to replace the Kawasaki Ki-3 light bomber with a completely indigenously designed and built aircraft. Mitsubishi and Kawasaki were requested to build two prototypes each by December 1936. The specification called for a top speed of 400 km/h (250 mph) at 3,000 m (9,800 ft); normal operating altitude from 2,000–4,000 m (6,600–13,100 ft), the ability to climb to 3,000 m (9,800 ft) within 8 minutes and an engine to be selected from the 825 hp (620 kW) Mitsubishi Ha-6 radial, 850 hp (630 kW) Nakajima Ha-5 radial, or 850 hp (630 kW) Kawasaki Ha-9-IIb liquid-cooled inline engines, a normal bomb load of 300 kg (661.4 lb) and a maximum of 450 kg (992.1 lb), one forward-firing machine gun and one flexible rearward-firing machine gun, the ability to perform 60-degree dives for dive bombing, and a loaded weight less than 3,300 kg (7,275.3 lb).

The first Kawasaki prototype flew in March 1937; seven more prototypes were produced. Being very similar in layout and performance, the main difference between the Kawasaki Ki-32 and its Mitsubishi Ki-30 rival was in the choice of an engine. The Mitsubishi design used the Nakajima Ha-5 14-cylinder air-cooled radial engine, whereas Kawasaki opted for their own Kawasaki Ha-9-II inline V12 engine.

Problems were encountered with the Kawasaki design, particularly with engine cooling, and the Mitsubishi Ki-30 received the production order. In spite of this, the pressing need for more aircraft in the Second Sino-Japanese War, which had started at full scale in July 1937, resulted in the Ki-32's entry into production as well, 12 months behind its rival. Ironically, the number of Ki-32s built was much higher than that of the successful Ki-30.

The Ki-32 entered production in 1938, designated as the Army Type 98 Single-engine Light Bomber. Kawasaki manufactured 854 Ki-32s before production ceased in May 1940.

== Operational history ==
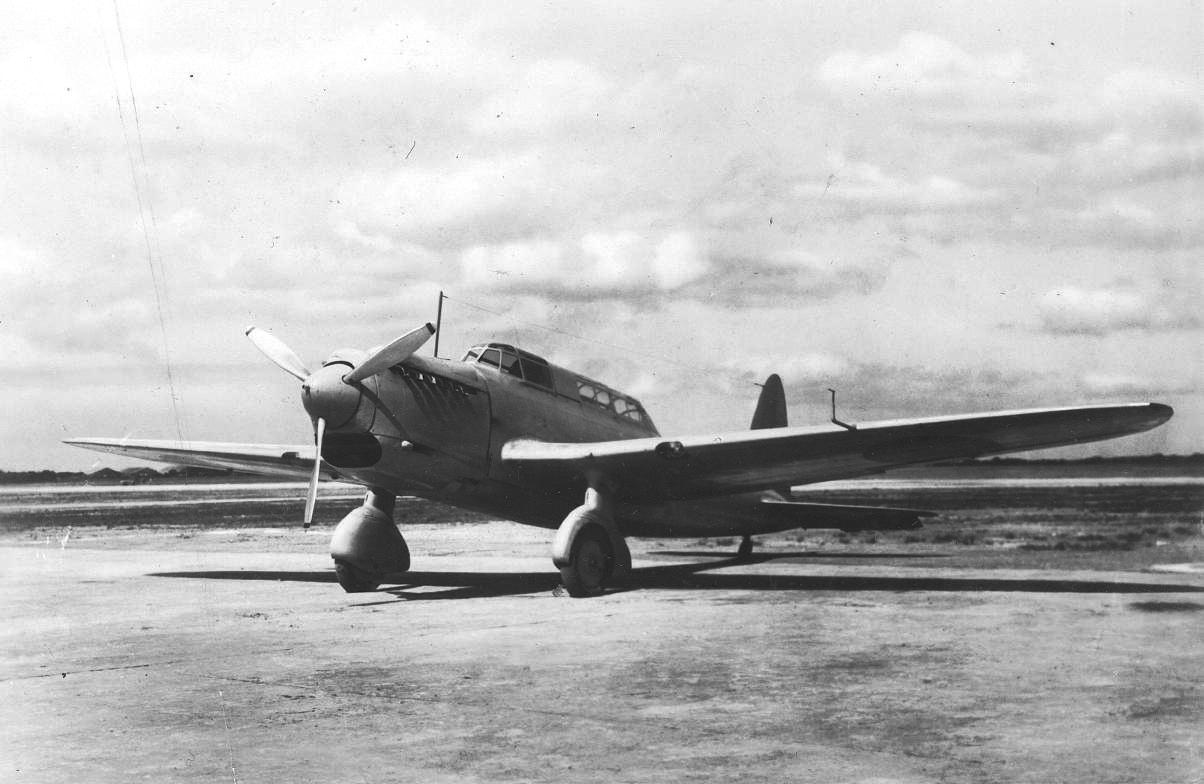
Kawasaki Ki-32

The Ki-32 saw extensive war service in the Second Sino-Japanese War, equipping the 3rd, 6th, 10th, 35th, 45th, 65th and 75th Sentai. It also saw combat during the Battle of Nomonhan against the Soviet Union in 1938–1939. Its last combat action was bombing Commonwealth forces during the Japanese invasion of Hong Kong in December 1941. After their withdrawal from front-line service in 1942, the Ki-32s were used in a training role.

During World War II, the Japanese also supplied Ki-32s to the Manchukuo Air Force to replace Manchukuo′s obsolescent Kawasaki Type 88/KDA-2 light bombers. Ki-32s were the main bomber of the Manchukuo Air Force throughout World War II.

== Operators ==
Japan

- Imperial Japanese Army Air Force
  - No. 3 Hikō Sentai IJAAF
  - No. 6 Hikō Sentai IJAAF
  - No. 10 Hikō Sentai IJAAF
  - No. 35 Hikō Sentai IJAAF
  - No. 45 Hikō Sentai IJAAF
  - No. 65 Hikō Sentai IJAAF
  - No. 75 Hikō Sentai IJAAF

Manchukuo

- Manchukuo Air Force

Indonesia

- In 1945, Indonesian People's Security Force (IPSF) (Indonesian pro-independence guerrillas) captured a small number of aircraft at numerous Japanese air bases, including Bugis Air Base in Malang (repatriated 18 September 1945). Most aircraft were destroyed in military conflicts between the Netherlands and the newly proclaimed-Republic of Indonesia during the Indonesian National Revolution of 1945–1949.

== Specifications ==
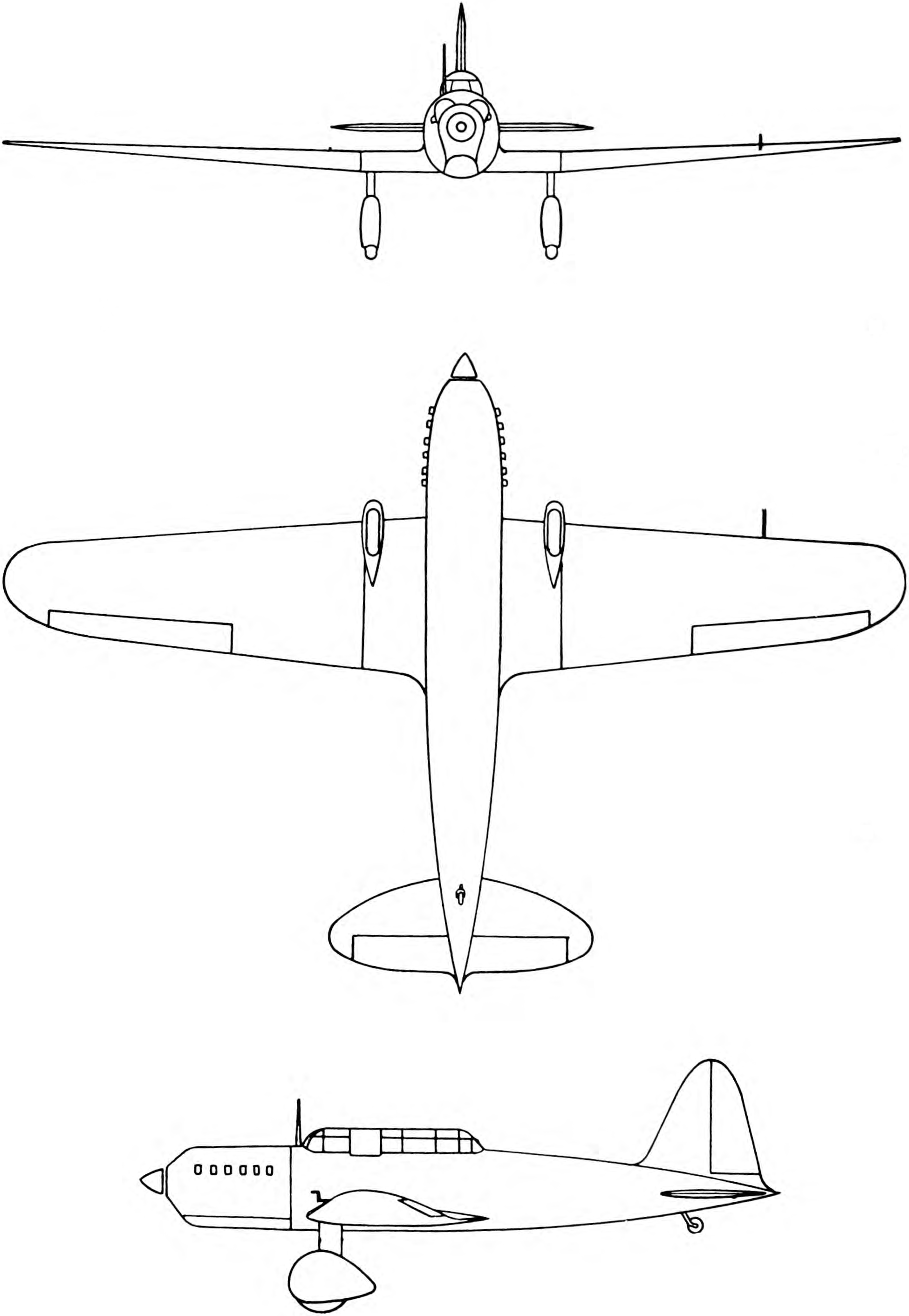
3-view drawing of the Kawasaki Ki-32

Data from The Concise Guide to Axis Aircraft of World War II; Japanese Aircraft of the Pacific War

General characteristics

- Crew: 2
- Length: 11.65 m (38 ft 2.5 in)
- Wingspan: 15.0 m (49 ft 2½ in)
- Height: 2.90m (9 ft 6 in)
- Wing area: 34.00 m^{2} (365.98 ft^{2})
- Empty weight: 1,066 kg (2,350 lb)
- Max takeoff weight: 3,760 kg (8,290 lb)
- Powerplant: 1× Kawasaki Ha-9-IIb liquid-cooled inline V12 engine, 634 kW (850 hp)

Performance

- Maximum speed: 423 km/h (228 knots, 263 mph) at (3,940 m) 12,900 ft
- Cruise speed: 300 km/h (162 knots, 186 mph)
- Range: 1,965 km (1,060 nm, 1,220 mi)
- Service ceiling: 8,920 m (29,265 ft)
- Rate of climb: 7.6 m/s (1500 ft/min)
- Wing loading: 104.1 kg/m^{2} (21.3 lb/ft^{2})

Armament

- Guns: 2× 7.7 mm (0.303 in) machine guns
- Bombs: 450 kg (990 lb)

== See also ==
Aircraft of comparable role, configuration, and era

- Fairey Battle
- Mitsubishi Ki-30
- Mitsubishi Ki-51

Related lists

- List of aircraft of World War II
- List of military aircraft of Japan

== Bibliography ==
- Francillon, René J. (1979). Japanese aircraft of the Pacific War. London: Putnam. ISBN 0-370-30251-6. OCLC 6124909. (new edition 1987 by Putnam Aeronautical Books, ISBN 0-85177-801-1.)
- Gunston, Bill (1999). The Illustrated Directory of Fighting Aircraft of World War II. London: Zenith Press. ISBN 0-86101-390-5.
- Jowett, Philipp (2005). Rays of the Rising Sun, Volume 1: Japan's Asian Allies 1931-45, China and Manchukuo. London: Helion and Company Ltd. ISBN 1-874622-21-3.
- Lake, Jon (2002). Great Book of Bombers. Zenith Press. ISBN 0-7603-1347-4.
- Lawrence, Joseph (1945). The Observer's Book Of Airplanes. London and New York: Frederick Warne & Co.
- Mikesh, Robert C.; Shorzoe Abe (1990). Japanese Aircraft, 1910-1941. Annapolis, MD: Naval Institute Press. ISBN 1-55750-563-2.
- Mondey, David (2002). The Concise Guide to Axis Aircraft of World War II. Book Sales Press. ISBN 1-85152-966-7.
