= Mitsubishi Ki-30 =

Japanese WWII light bomber aircraft

Ki-30
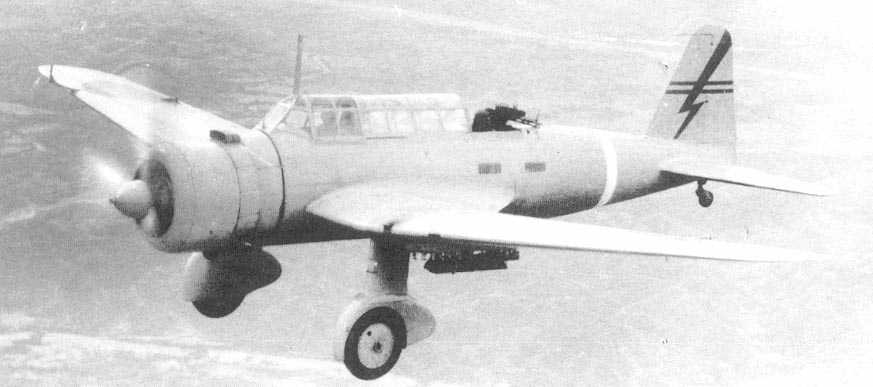
- Mitsubishi Ki-30 (Army Type 97 Light Bomber)

General information
- Type: Light bomber
- Manufacturer: Mitsubishi Heavy Industries
- Primary users: Imperial Japanese Army Air Force Royal Thai Air Force
- Number built: 704

History
- Manufactured: 1938–1941
- Introduction date: January 1938
- First flight: 28 February 1937

The Mitsubishi Ki-30 (九七式軽爆撃機, Kyunana-shiki keibakugekiki; lit. ''Type 97 light bomber'') was a Japanese light bomber of World War II. It was a single-engine, mid-wing, cantilever monoplane of stressed-skin construction with a fixed tailwheel undercarriage and a long transparent cockpit canopy. The type had significance in being the first Japanese aircraft to be powered by a modern two-row radial engine. During the war, it was known by the Allies by the name Ann. It was mistakenly identified by the British as the Mitsubishi Army 97 Ann.

== Design and development ==
The Ki-30 was developed in response to a May 1936 Imperial Japanese Army specification to replace the Kawasaki Ki-3 light bomber with a completely indigenously designed and built aircraft. Mitsubishi and Kawasaki were requested to build two prototypes each by December 1936. The specification called for a top speed of 400 km/h (250 mph) at 3,000 m (9,840 ft); normal operating altitude from 2,000 m (6,560 ft) to 4,000 m (13,130 ft), the ability to climb to 3,000 m (9,840 ft) within eight minutes and an engine to be selected from the 634 kW (850 hp) Mitsubishi Ha-6 radial, 615 kW (825 hp) Nakajima Ha-5 radial, or 634 kW (850 hp) Kawasaki Ha-9-IIb liquid-cooled inline engines, a normal bomb load of 300 kg (660 lb) and a maximum of 450 kg (990 lb), one forward-firing machine gun and one flexible rearward-firing machine gun, the ability to perform 60° dives for dive bombing, and a loaded weight less than 3,300 kg (7,280 lb).

The first Mitsubishi prototype flew on 28 February 1937 powered by a Mitsubishi Ha-6 radial. Originally, designed with a retractable main landing gear, wind tunnel tests indicated that the gain in speed was minimal due to the landing gear's extra weight and complexity and a fixed arrangement with "spatted" main wheels was chosen instead. The wing was mounted at a point above the line of the aircraft's belly in order to fully enclose the bomb bay within the fuselage. The pilot sat just above the leading edge of the wing, and the rear-gunner/radio-operator just behind the wing trailing edge, in a long "greenhouse" canopy which gave both crewmen excellent all-around vision. The Ha-6 engine drove a three-blade variable-pitch propeller.

A second prototype, fitted with the slightly more powerful Nakajima Ha-5 engine, was completed the same month. Although two months behind schedule and overweight, both prototypes met or exceeded every other requirement. The second prototype's top speed of 423 km/h (263 mph) at 4,000 m (13,130 ft) led the Imperial Japanese Army Air Force to place an order for 16 service trials machines. These were delivered in January 1938 and after successful trials the Army ordered the Ki-30 into production in March under the designation Army Type 97 Light bomber.

Mitsubishi built 618 production machines through April 1940, and the 1st Army Air Arsenal (Tachikawa Dai-Ichi Rikugun Kokusho) built 68 more by the time production ceased in September 1941. Including prototypes, a total of 704 Ki-30s were built.

== Operational history ==
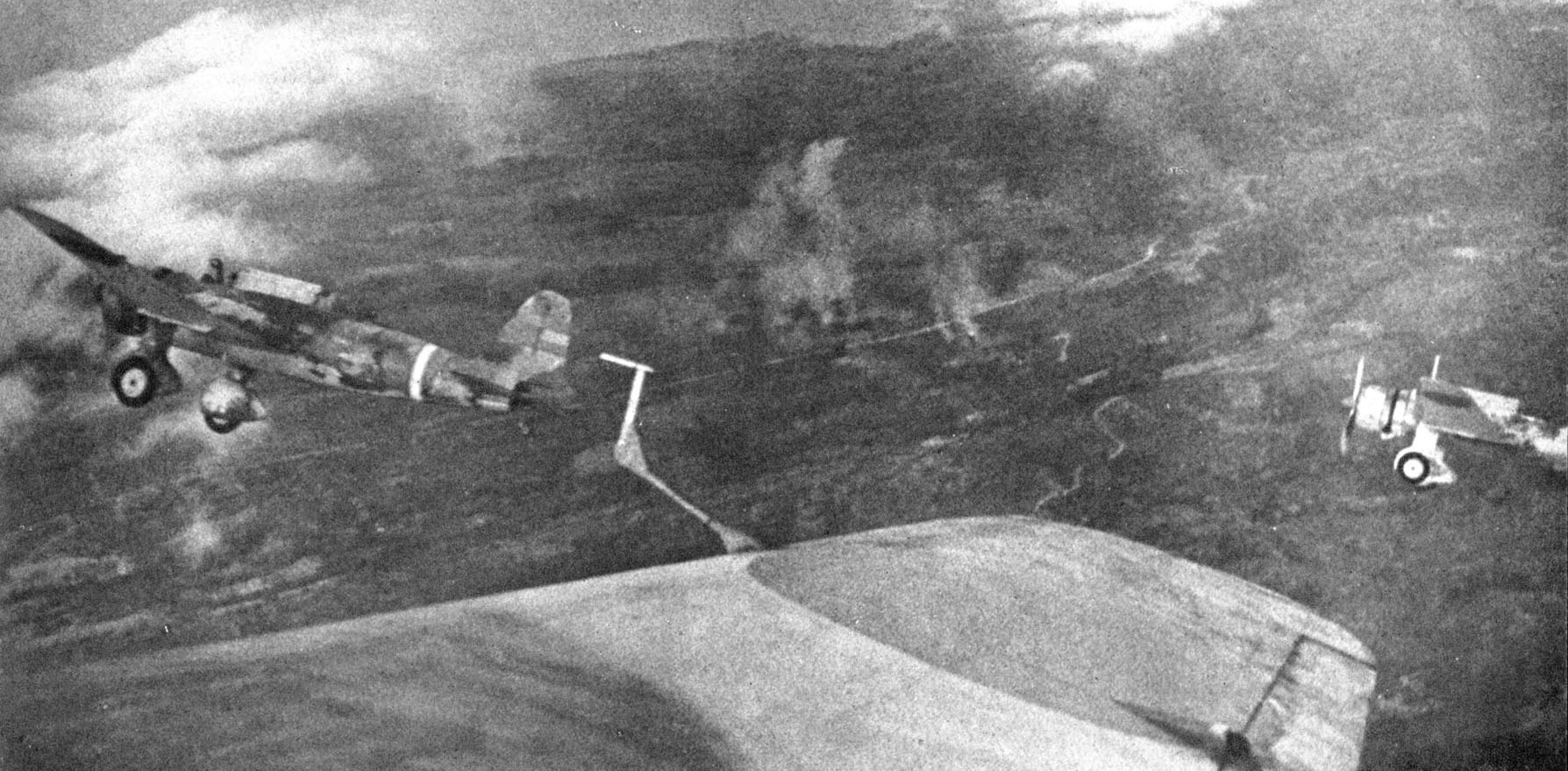
Japanese Army Air Force Mitsubishi Ki-30 (Allied code name "Ann") bombers flying over the main line on Bataan in 1942.

The Ki-30s were first used in combat in Second Sino-Japanese War from the Spring of 1938. It proved to be reliable in rough field operations and highly effective while operating with fighter escort. This success continued in the early stages of the Pacific War, and the Ki-30s participated extensively in operations in the Philippines. However, once unescorted Ki-30s met Allied fighters, losses mounted rapidly, and the type was soon withdrawn to second-line duties. By the end of 1942, most Ki-30s were relegated to a training role. Many aircraft were expended in kamikaze attacks towards the end of the war.

From late 1940, the Ki-30 was in service with the Royal Thai Air Force, and they saw combat in January 1941 against the French in French Indochina in the French-Thai War. Twenty-four aircraft were delivered and were nicknamed Nagoya by the crews. Additional Ki-30s were transferred from Japan in 1942.

== Operators ==
=== World War II ===
Japan

- Imperial Japanese Army Air Force
  - No. 82 Dokuritsu Hikō Chutai IJAAF
  - No. 87 Dokuritsu Hikō Chutai IJAAF
  - No. 6 Hikō Sentai IJAAF
  - No. 16 Hikō Sentai IJAAF
  - No. 31 Hikō Sentai IJAAF
  - No. 32 Hikō Sentai IJAAF
  - No. 35 Hikō Sentai IJAAF
  - No. 90 Hikō Sentai IJAAF

Thailand

- Royal Thai Air Force – Locally designated B.J.2 (Thai: บ.จ.๒).

=== Post-war ===
People's Republic of China

- Chinese Communist Air Force – Operated three captured Ki-30s used as trainers until the early 1950s.

Indonesia

- Indonesian Air Force

== Specifications (Ki-30) ==
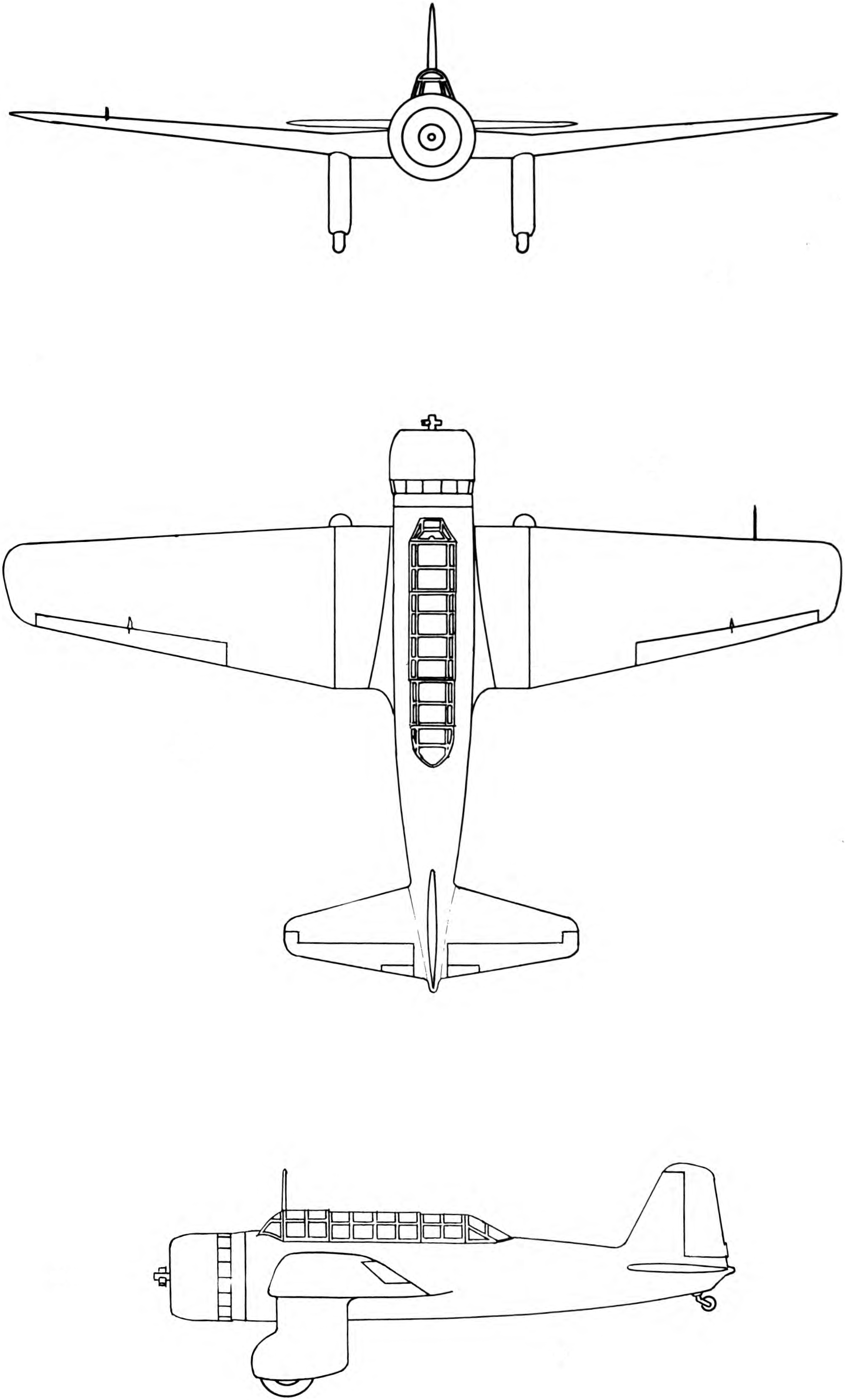
3-view drawing of the Mitsubishi Ki-30

Data from Japanese Aircraft of the Pacific War

General characteristics

- Crew: 2
- Length: 10.35 m (33 ft 11 in)
- Wingspan: 14.55 m (47 ft 9 in)
- Height: 3.65 m (12 ft 0 in)
- Wing area: 30.58 m^{2} (329.2 sq ft)
- Empty weight: 2,230 kg (4,916 lb)
- Gross weight: 3,320 kg (7,319 lb)
- Powerplant: 1 × Nakajima Ha5-Kai 14-cylinder air-cooled radial piston engine, 708 kW (949 hp)
- Propellers: 3-bladed variable-pitch propeller

Performance

- Maximum speed: 423 km/h (263 mph, 228 kn)
- Cruise speed: 380 km/h (240 mph, 210 kn)
- Never exceed speed: 442 km/h (275 mph, 239 kn)
- Range: 1,700 km (1,100 mi, 920 nmi)
- Service ceiling: 8,570 m (28,120 ft)
- Rate of climb: 8.33 m/s (1,640 ft/min)
- Wing loading: 108.6 kg/m^{2} (22.2 lb/sq ft)

Armament

- Guns: 2× 7.7 mm (0.303 in) Type 89 machine guns (one fixed wing-mounted and another manually aimed from the rear cockpit)
- Bombs: 400 kg (882 lb) bombload

== See also ==
Aircraft of comparable role, configuration, and era

- Kawasaki Ki-32
- Mitsubishi Ki-51
- Heinkel He 70
- Fairey Battle
- PZL.23 Karaś
- Sukhoi Su-2
- Vultee A-35 Vengeance

Related lists

- List of aircraft of World War II
- List of military aircraft of Japan

== Bibliography ==
- Francillon, René J. (1979). Japanese Aircraft of the Pacific War. London: Putnam & Company Ltd. ISBN 0-370-30251-6.
- Gunston, Bill (1999). The Illustrated Directory of Fighting Aircraft of World War II. London: Zenith Press. ISBN 0-86101-390-5.
- Lake, Jon (2002). Great Book of Bombers. London: Zenith Press. ISBN 0-7603-1347-4.
- Lawrence, Joseph (1945). The Observer's Book Of Airplanes. London and New York: Frederick Warne & Co.
- Mikesh, Robert C.; Shorzoe Abe (1990). Japanese Aircraft 1910–1941. Annapolis, MD: Naval Institute Press. ISBN 1-55750-563-2.
- Mondey, David (2002). The Concise Guide to Axis Aircraft of World War II. London: Chancellor Press. ISBN 1-85152-966-7.
- Soumille, Jean-Claude (September 1999). "Les avions japonais aux coleurs françaises" [Japanese Aircraft in French Colors]. Avions: Toute l'Aéronautique et Son Histoire (in French) (78): 6–17. ISSN 1243-8650.
- Young, Edward M. (1984). "France's Forgotten Air War". Air Enthusiast. No. 25. pp. 22–33. ISSN 0143-5450.
