= Kawanishi K8K =

Japanese trainer floatplane

K8K

General information
- Type: Floatplane trainer
- National origin: Japan
- Manufacturer: Kawanishi Aircraft Company
- Primary user: Imperial Japanese Navy
- Number built: 15

History
- Introduction date: 1940
- First flight: 6 July 1938

The Kawanishi K8K (long designation - Kawanishi Navy Type 0 Primary Seaplane Trainer) was a Japanese floatplane trainer designed and built by the Kawanishi Aircraft Company for the Imperial Japanese Navy. It was selected for production, but only a small number were built before a change in the Japanese Navy's training needs led to production being stopped.

== Development and design ==
In 1937, the Imperial Japanese Navy drew up a specification for a 12-shi (Note: In the Japanese Navy designation system, specifications were given a Shi number based on the year of the Emperor's reign it was issued. In this case 11-Shi stood for 1936, the 11th year of the Shōwa era.) primary floatplane trainer to replace its Yokosuka K4Y or Navy Type 90 Primary Seaplane Trainer. The specification was issued to the established builders of aircraft for the Navy, Kawanishi and Watanabe and to the relative newcomer Nihon Hikoki (also known as "Nippi"). The specification required use of the same Gasuden Jimpu radial engine used by the K4Y, and the three designs showed little changes from the aircraft they were to replace.

Kawanishi's design, which was given the short designation K8K1, was, like the other two designs, a single-engine biplane with a fabric-covered, steel-tube fuselage and a wooden wing with two floats. The trainee and instructor sat in individual open cockpits. The first of three prototypes made its maiden flight on 6 July 1938 was handed over to the Navy for testing in August that year. Nippi's submission (the K8Ni) was disqualified from the competition because it was completed too late, and the K8K was found to be much better than the K4Y, which it was intended to replace. It was selected in preference to Watanabe's Watanabe K8W and placed in production as the Navy Type 0 Primary Seaplane Trainer. After twelve more aircraft had been built, however, production was stopped, as the Navy had decided to use the more powerful Yokosuka K5Y to carry out primary floatplane training.

== Specifications ==
Data from Japanese Aircraft 1910–1941

General characteristics

- Crew: 2
- Length: 8.80 m (28 ft 10 in)
- Wingspan: 9.50 m (31 ft 2 in)
- Wing area: 24.0 m^{2} (258 sq ft)
- Empty weight: 719 kg (1,585 lb)
- Gross weight: 991 kg (2,185 lb)
- Powerplant: 1 × Gasuden Jimpu 2 seven-cylinder air-cooled radial engine, 120 kW (160 hp)

Performance

- Maximum speed: 185 km/h (115 mph, 100 kn)
- Cruise speed: 120 km/h (75 mph, 65 kn)
- Range: 513 km (319 mi, 277 nmi)
- Service ceiling: 3,940 m (12,930 ft)
- Time to altitude: 5 minutes 40 sec to 3,000 m (9,800 ft)
