= North American T-6 Texan =

American single-engined advanced trainer aircraft

T-6 Texan/SNJ/Harvard
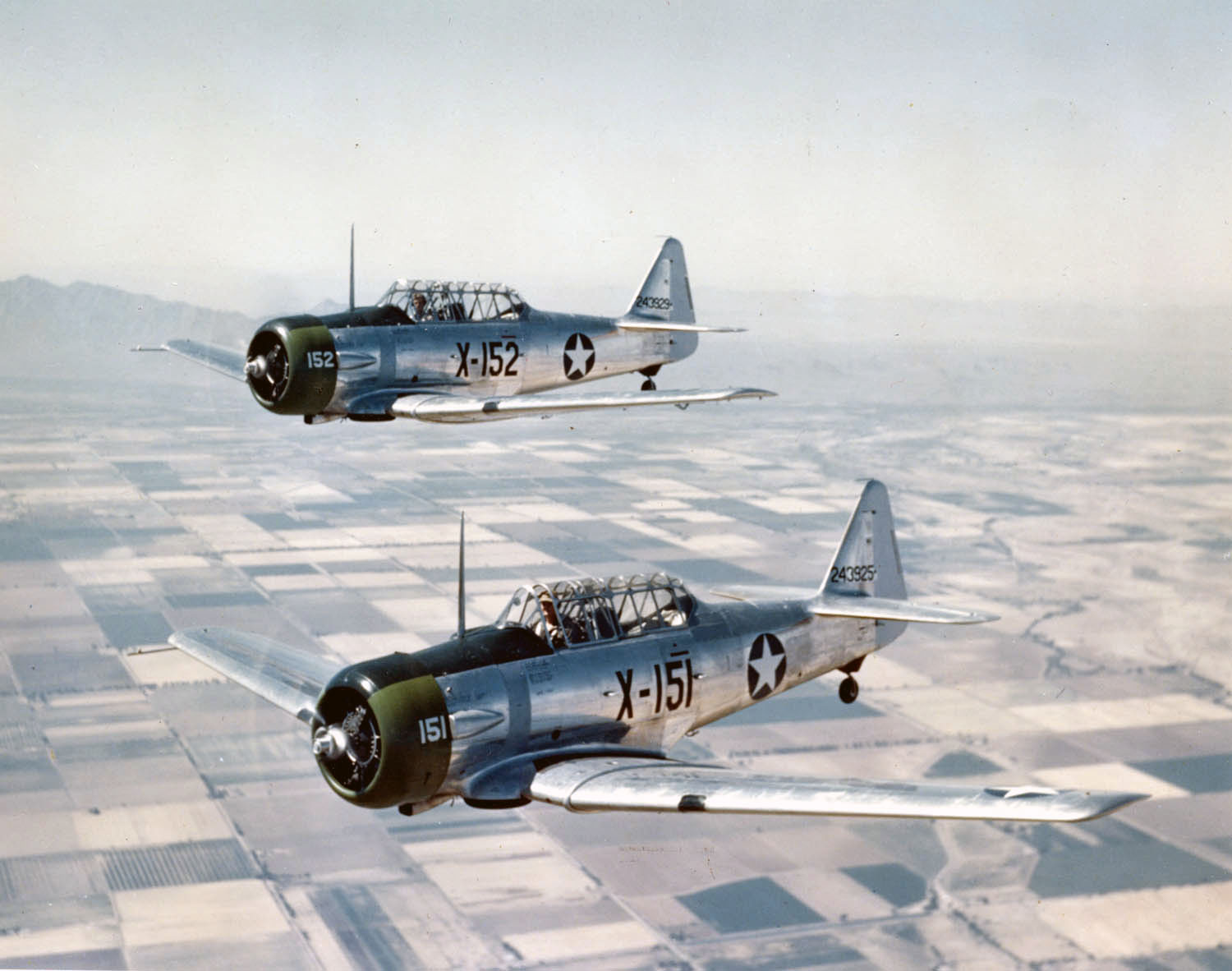
- USAAF AT-6Cs near Luke Field, 1943

General information
- Type: Trainer aircraft
- National origin: United States
- Manufacturer: North American Aviation
- Primary users: United States Army Air Forces: United States Navy; Royal Air Force; Royal Canadian Air Force
- Number built: 15,495

History
- First flight: 1 April 1935
- Retired: 1995 (South African Air Force)
- Developed from: North American NA-16
- Variants: North American A-27; Bacon Super T-6

The North American Aviation T-6 Texan is a single-engined advanced trainer aircraft designed and produced by the American aircraft manufacturer North American Aviation. It has been known by a variety of designations depending on the model and operating air force. The United States Army Air Corps (USAAC) and USAAF designated it as the AT-6, the United States Navy the SNJ, and British Commonwealth air forces the Harvard, the name by which it is best known outside the US. Starting in 1948, the new United States Air Force (USAF) designated it the T-6, with the USN following in 1962.

Internally designated as the NA-26, it was based on the North American NA-16 prototype and was submitted to the USAAC Basic Combat Trainer competition in March 1937 and entering service later that same year. The T-6 was used to train pilots of the United States Army Air Forces (USAAF), United States Air Force (USAF), United States Navy (USN), Royal Air Force (RAF), Royal Canadian Air Force (RCAF), and other air forces of the British Commonwealth during World War II. The type was supplied to numerous U.S. allies under the Lend-Lease initiative, while both the Canada Car and Foundry and Noorduyn produced the type under license. In total, 15,495 T-6s of all variants have been built.

The T-6 continued to be operated into the Cold War, being used during both the Korean War and the Vietnam War to perform the forward air control mission. During this era, it became frequently used for counterinsurgency operations, such as by the RAF against the Mau Mau rebellion, the French Air Force during the Algerian War, the Portuguese Air Force during the Portuguese Colonial War, and the Spanish Air Force during the Ifni War. Multiple operators flew T-6s during the 1948 Arab–Israeli War. It also saw action during the Ecuadorian–Peruvian War, the India–Pakistan war of 1971, the Greek Civil War and the South African Border War. During the 1990s, most remaining military operators opted to withdraw the type. The T-6 continued to fly in civil hands. Into the twenty-first century, it has remained a popular warbird used for airshow demonstrations and static displays. On occasion, the T-6 has been used many times to represent various historical aircraft, including the Japanese Mitsubishi A6M Zero.

== Design and development ==
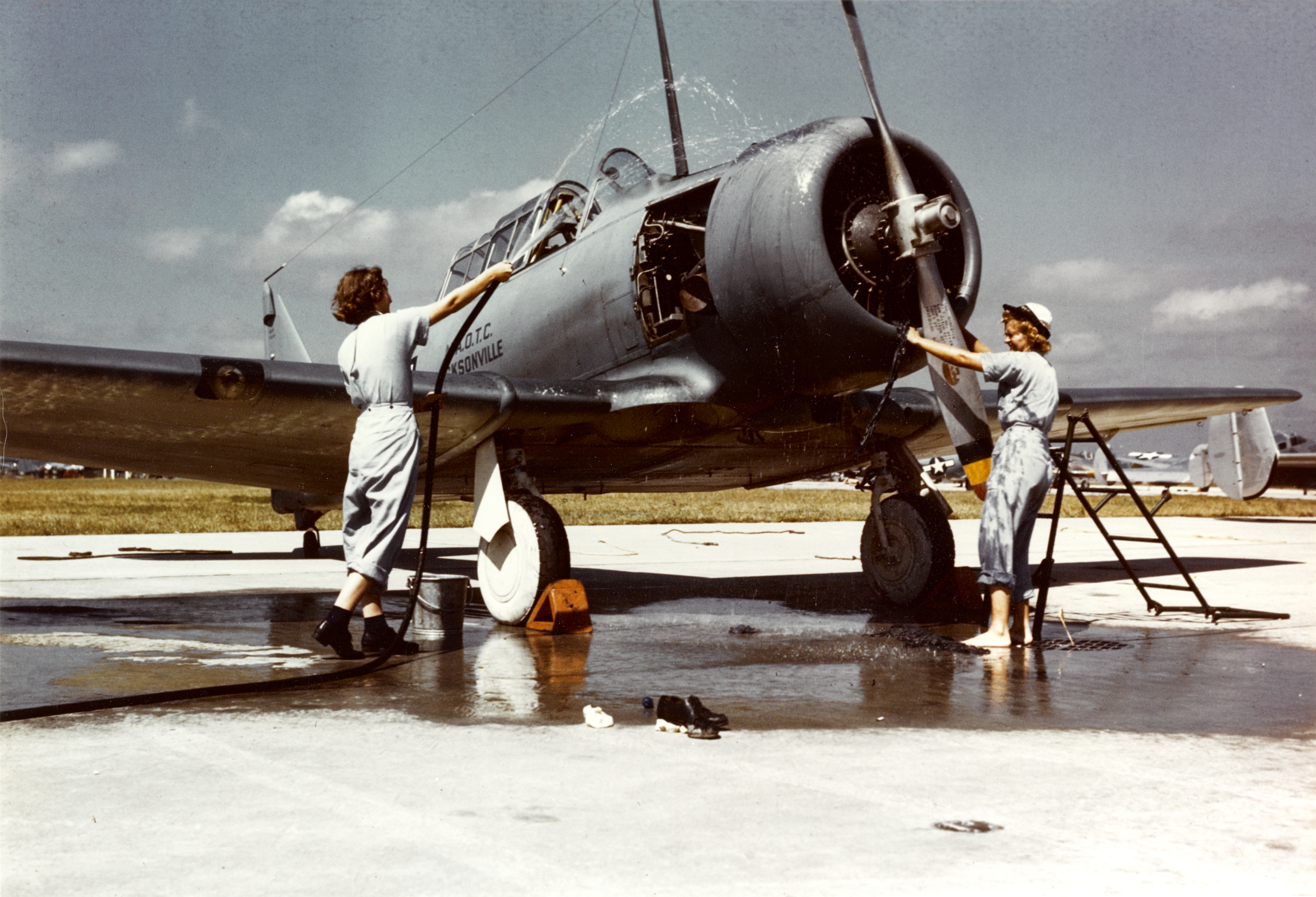
WAVES washing an SNJ at NAS Jacksonville, Florida, USA

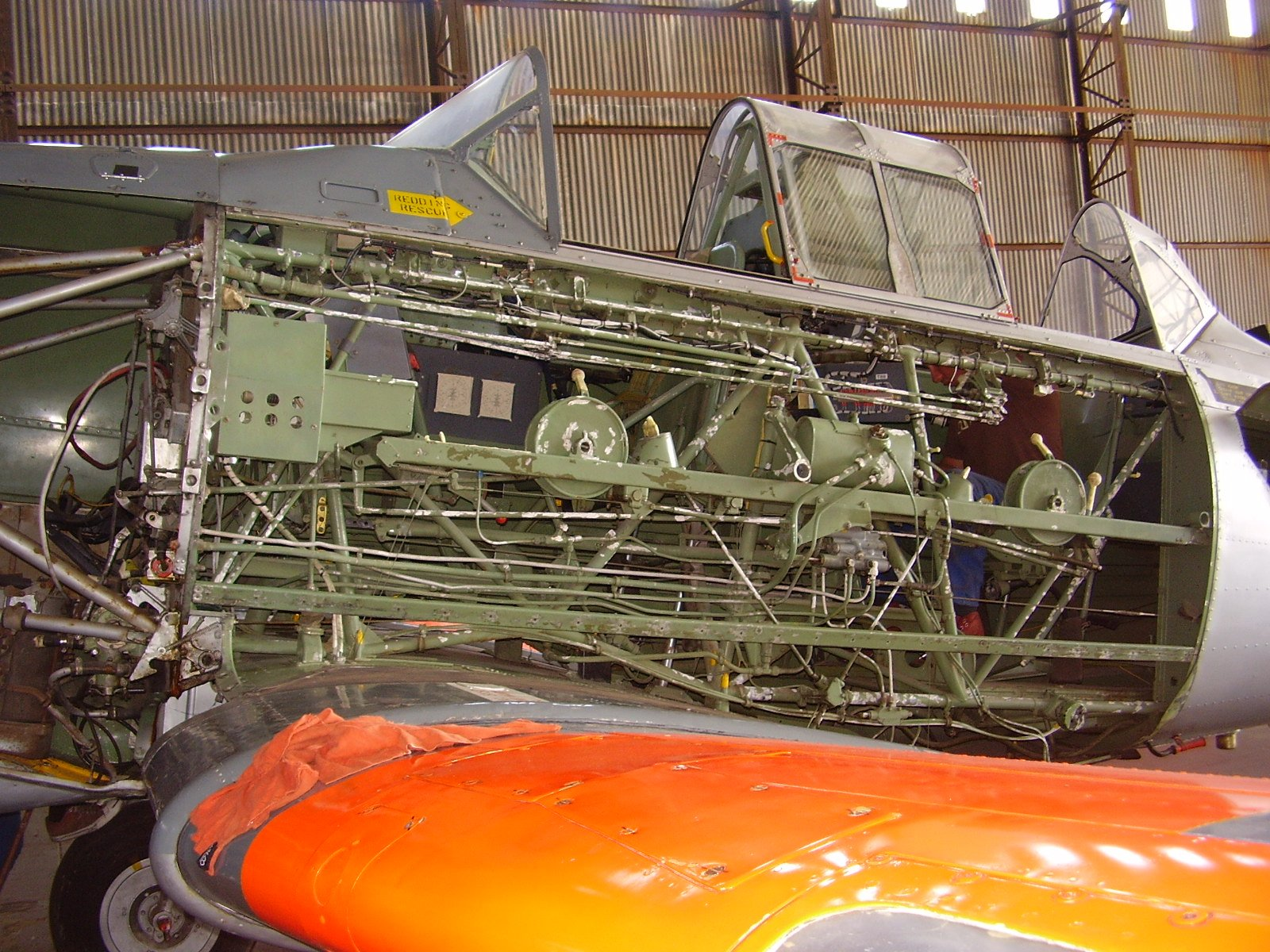
South African Air Force Harvard under restoration exposing internal structure

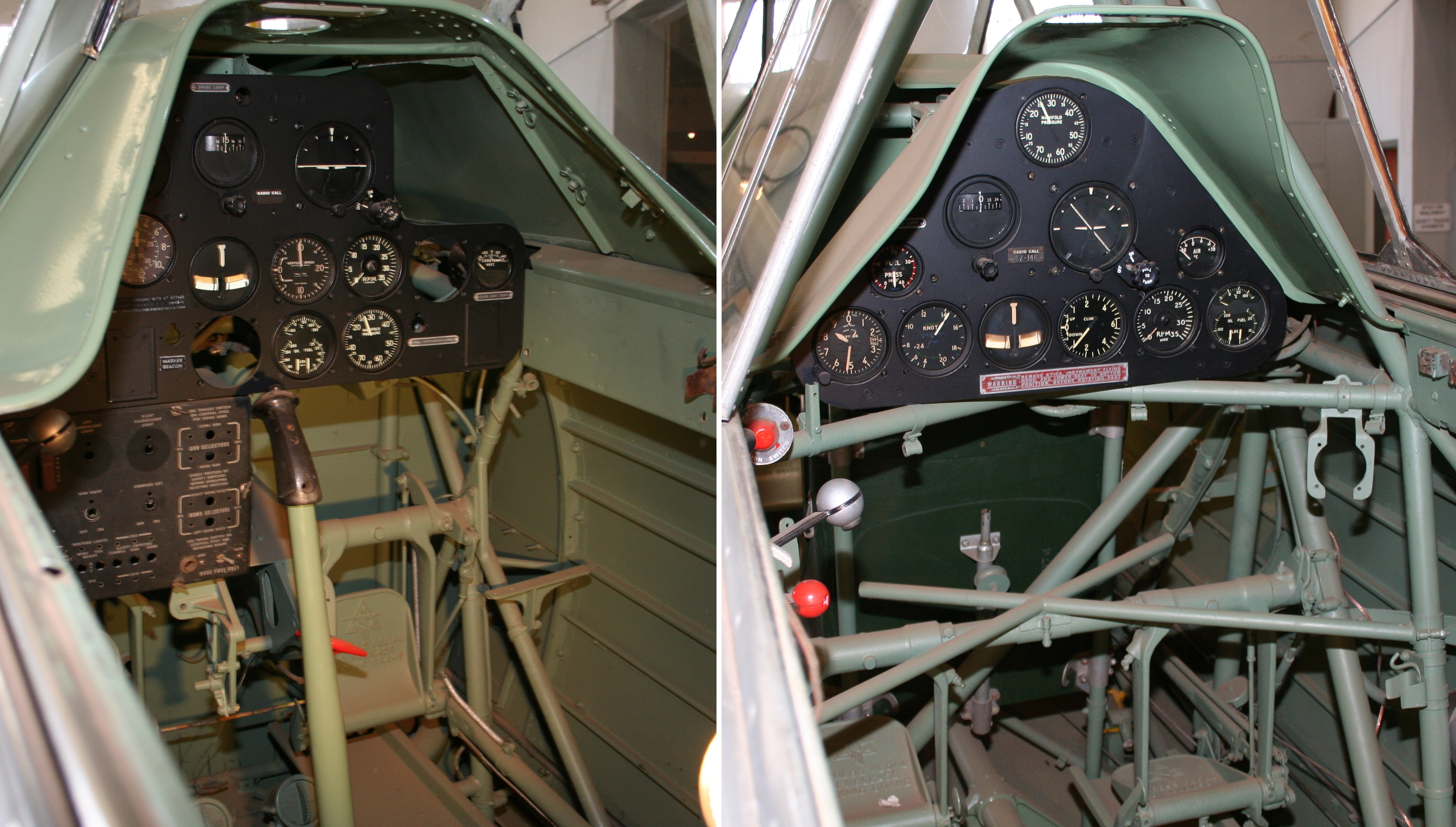
Left – front cockpit, right – rear cockpit

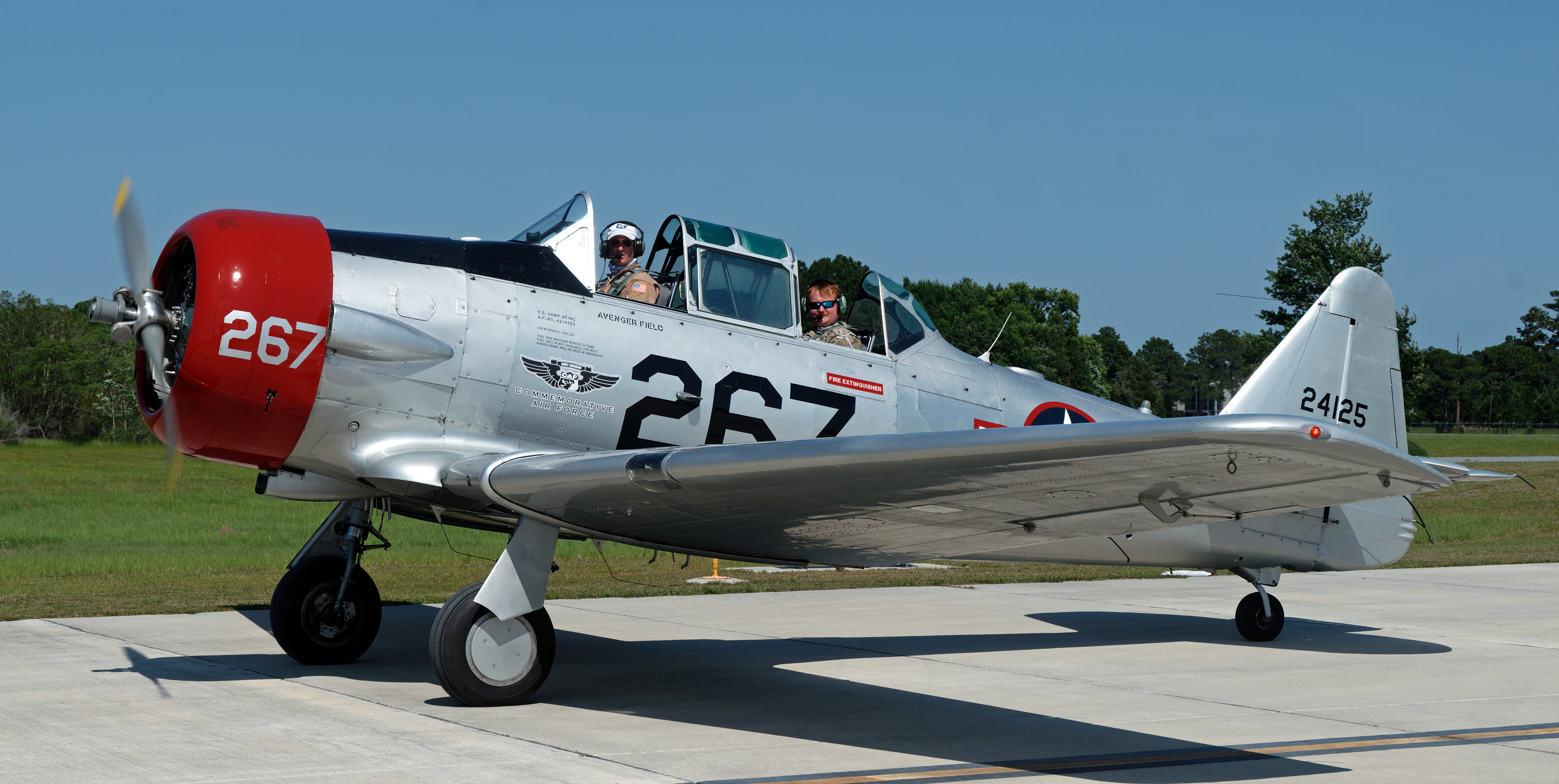
"Nella", owned by the Commemorative Air Force, preparing for take off

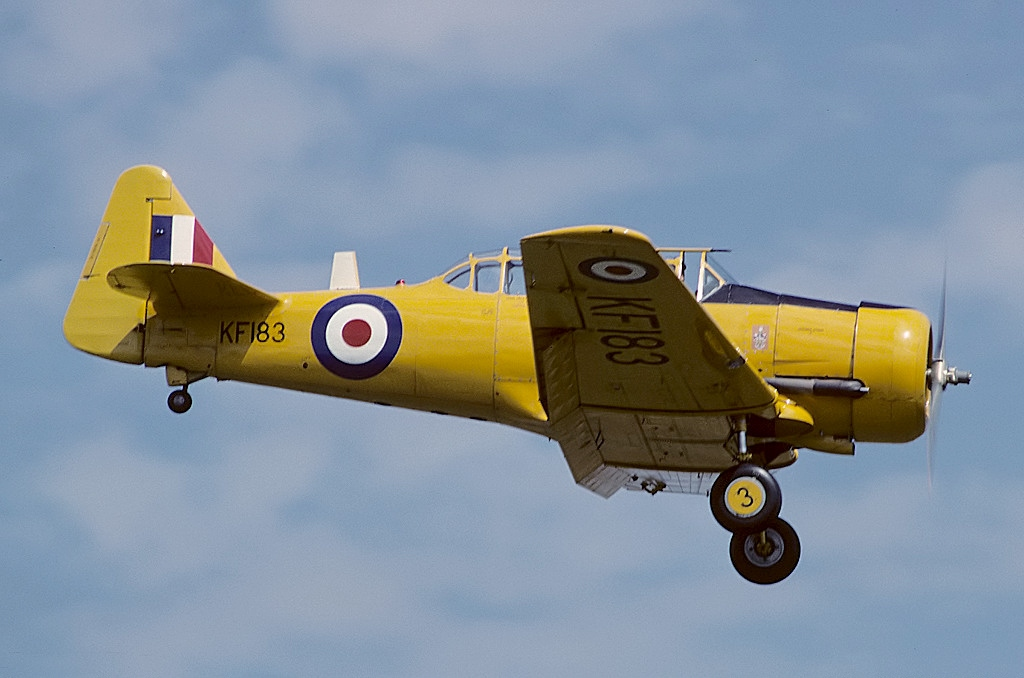
A Noorduyn AT-16 Harvard IIB

The Texan's ancestry goes back to the North American NA-16 prototype, which was first flown on 1 April 1935. That same year, NAA submitted the design for the USAAC Basic Trainer Competition; the company also targeted the export market.

Modified as the NA-26, it was submitted as an entry for a USAAC Basic Combat Trainer competition in March 1937. Based on the NA-18, but with a foot-longer wingspan, it was the first of the NA-16 series with retractable landing gear. It was similar to the BT-9, but with a larger engine, the 550 hp (410 kW) Pratt & Whitney R-1340 Wasp, and could accommodate two .30 in (7.62 mm) guns. Receiving only minor alterations, 177 unarmed NA-36s entered service as the BC-1 with a R-1340-47 engine from 9 June 1937. Roughly 30 were modified as BC-1-I instrument trainers. The BC-1A (NA-55-1) followed as an armed version, primarily for Air Corps Reserve and National Guard units, and the 83 built could be equipped with a .30 in (7.62 mm) machine gun on the nose and a flexible gun in the rear cockpit.

The USN received 40 NA-28 aircraft based on the BT-9, which it designated the NJ-1, as well as 16 NA-52s, designated the SNJ-1, 36 NA-65 as SNJ-2s, and 25 NA-79 also as SNJ-2s.

In March 1937, the Commonwealth Aircraft Corporation of Australia purchased an NA-32 (NA-16-1A, with fixed undercarriage) and an NA-33 (NA-16-2K with retractable undercarriage) along with a manufacturing license. The first CAC Wirraway, based on the NA-33, flew on 27 March 1939, of which 755 aircraft were built.

In August 1937, Mitsubishi Jukogyo K.K. purchased a single NA-16, NA-16-4R (NA-37), powered by the 450 hp (340 kW) Pratt & Whitney R-985-9CG, including manufacturing rights. A second N-16, NA-16-4RW (NA-47), powered by a smaller Wright engine, was ordered in December 1937. After being evaluated by the Imperial Japanese Navy, Kyusu and K.K. Watanabe Tekkosho chose to ignore the NAA design almost entirely, and built 176 of the somewhat similar K10W1 from 1941 to 1942, which the Allies gave the code name Oak. After WWII, the Japanese Air Self Defense Force operated 195 Texans (9 T-6Ds, 11 T-6Fs, and 175 T-6Gs) and the Japanese Maritime Self Defence Force operated 62 (10 SNJ-4s, 41 SNJ-5s, and 11 SNJ-6s).

According to Dan Hagedorn, "the BC-1A series may be regarded as the true beginning of the modern AT-6 series". In December 1938, the British Commonwealth started receiving the first of 400 Harvard Mark Is (NA-49), for use in the Central Flying School. They were powered by the 600 hp (450 kW) Pratt & Whitney R-1340-S3H1 Wasp. In May 1939, the RCAF ordered 30 Harvard Mark Is (NA-61). Then in November 1939, the British Purchasing Commission ordered the first of eventually 1275 Harvard Mark IIs (NA-66, NA-75, NA-76, and NA-81) for the RAF and RCAF.

On 23 April 1939, NAA received a contract for 251 BT-14s and 94 AT-6s. The BT-14 (NA-58) was a fixed-gear aircraft with a metal-skinned fuselage 14 inches longer than the BT-9. In 1941, 27 BT-14s were refitted with the 400 hp (300 kW) R-985-11 and designated as BT-14A-NAs. In June 1939, NAA received an order for 94 AT-6-NAs (NA-59), powered by the Wright R-1340-47 and able to mount two .30 in (7.62 mm) machines guns.

The USAAC AT-6A and the USN SNJ-3 were based on the NA-77 and NA-78 designs. Pratt & Whitney R-1340-49 Wasp radial engines powered the USAAC aircraft, while R-1340-38s powered the USN aircraft. The USAAC received 1847 AT-6As, and the USN received 270 SNJ-3s.

The AT-6B (NA-84) was built for armament training and could mount a .30 in (7.62 mm) machine gun on the right nose cowl and right wing and in the rear cockpit and could carry a light bomb rack. The aircraft was powered by the 600 hp (450 kW) R-1340-AN-1 engine. The USAAC received 400.

The NA-88 design was used to build 2,970 AT-6Cs (747 of which went to the British Commonwealth as Harvard IIas), 2401 SNJ-4s, 2604 AT-6Ds (537 of which went to the British Commonwealth as Harvard IIIs), and 1357 SNJ-5s. The first AT-6C aircraft was delivered on 12 February 1942. The 12-volt electrical system was changed to a 24-volt system in the AT-6D, for standardization amongst the service. The AT-6D, which was also armament-capable, and early versions included a wing gun camera and a high-pressure oxygen system. The AT-6D used two toggle starter switches, rather than the foot-pedal starter, and the first AT-6D was delivered on 22 July 1943. The USN received an additional 630 AT-6Ds direct from the USAAF, redesignating them SNJ-5s, for a total of 1987. Similarly, the NA-121 design was used to build the final wartime Texans and included 800 AT-6Ds (of which 211 went to the USN as SNJ-5s), and 956 AT-6Fs (of which 411 went to the USN as SNJ-6s). They were capable of carrying a 20 US gal (76 L; 17 imp gal) centerline drop tank.

From 1942, Canada's Noorduyn built 2,557 R-1340-AN-1-powered Harvard IIs under license, paid for by USAAF Lend-Lease funds as the AT-16, but they were designated as the Harvard II.B. After WWII, many remained in service with the RCAF.

The NA-168 series consisted of remanufactured AT-6s and SNJs for the USAF, starting in 1949. The Air Training Command received 641 aircraft, designated T-6G-NT, of which 416 eventually were sent to U.S. Military Assistance Program countries. U.S. National Guard units received an additional 50 aircraft, of which 28 eventually were sent to France. An additional 59 aircraft were liaison/trainer aircraft, designated LT-6G-NA, for the Korean War. These aircraft could be deployed with two detachable .30 in (7.62 mm) machine-gun pods and four HVARs or four 100 lb (45 kg) bombs, plus a 55 US gal (210 L; 46 imp gal) auxiliary drop tank. Alternatively, they could carry the gun pods and 12 2.25 in (57 mm) SCA markings rockets or six 100 lb (45 kg) bombs. The T-6G-NAs had a 140 US gal (530 L; 120 imp gal) fuel capacity, while previous models had a 110 US gal (420 L; 92 imp gal) capacity. The rear cockpit also had the same instruments as the front cockpit. Then in 1951, the USAF placed an order for 824 T-6Gs, designated T-6G-1-NH, for the Air Training Command.

The Canada Car and Foundry built 285 Harvard 4s, designated NA-186, under the Mutual Defense Assistance Program (MDAP) and an additional 270 aircraft directly for the RCAF. In April 1951, the USAF ordered an additional 107 T-6Gs for the MDAP, designated NA-188. They placed an order for 11 training aircraft in March 1952, designated NA-195, and then a final batch of 110 aircraft in June for MDAP, designated NA-197.

== Operational history ==
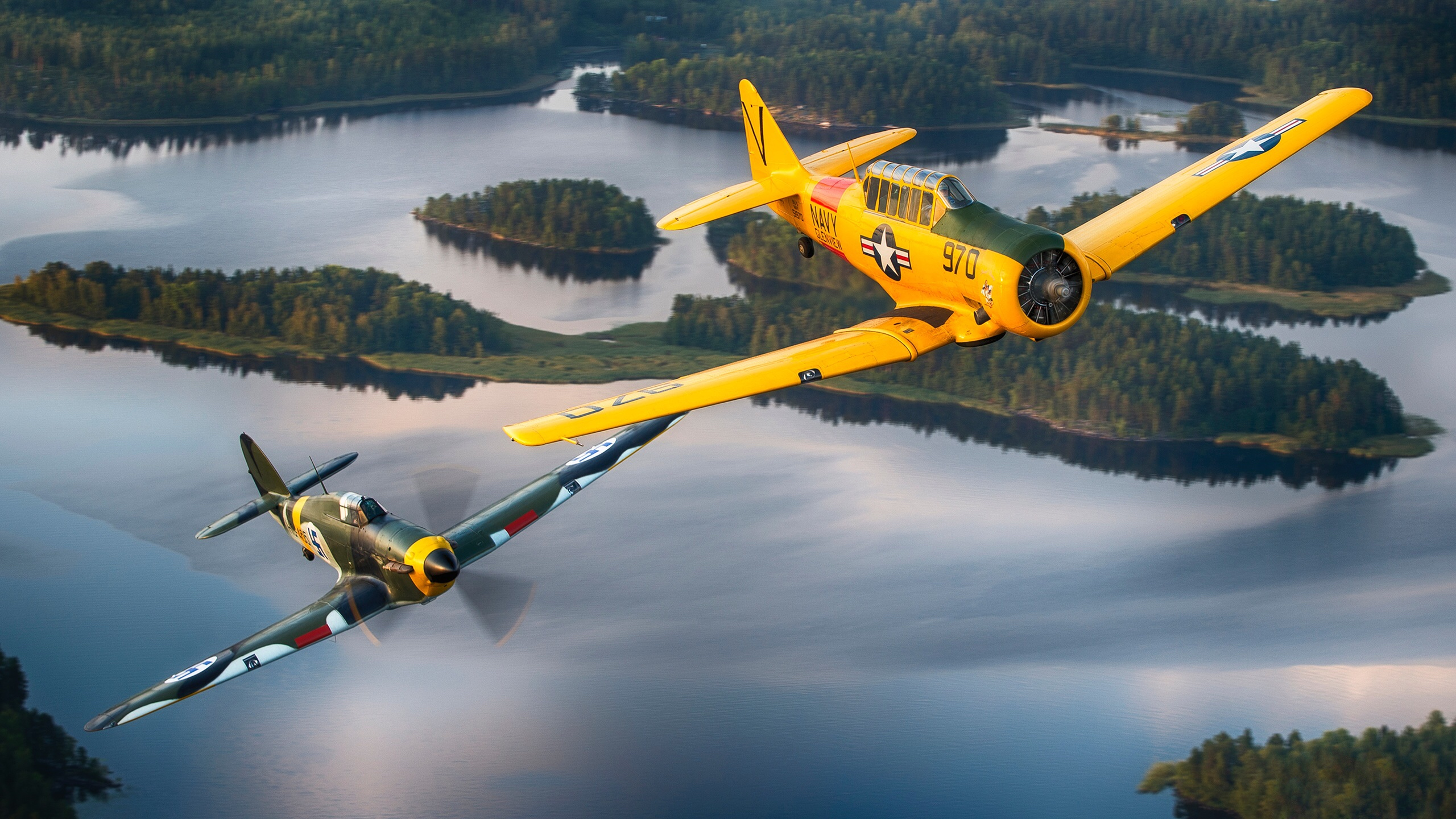
A Finnish Air Force Hawker Hurricane and a U.S. Navy T-6 Texan in 2014.

The aircraft was mainly used for training, but in many cases, it was also repurposed into combat roles. The aircraft served in over 60 air forces around the world during the 20th century. After serving in air forces, it also went on to be displayed at air shows and museums as a warbird.

=== Combat use ===
The British used Harvards during World War II in North Africa, but not in a combat role. They were used extensively for preparing pilots in-theatre for flying US aircraft types, whose handling and controls differed from British aircraft.

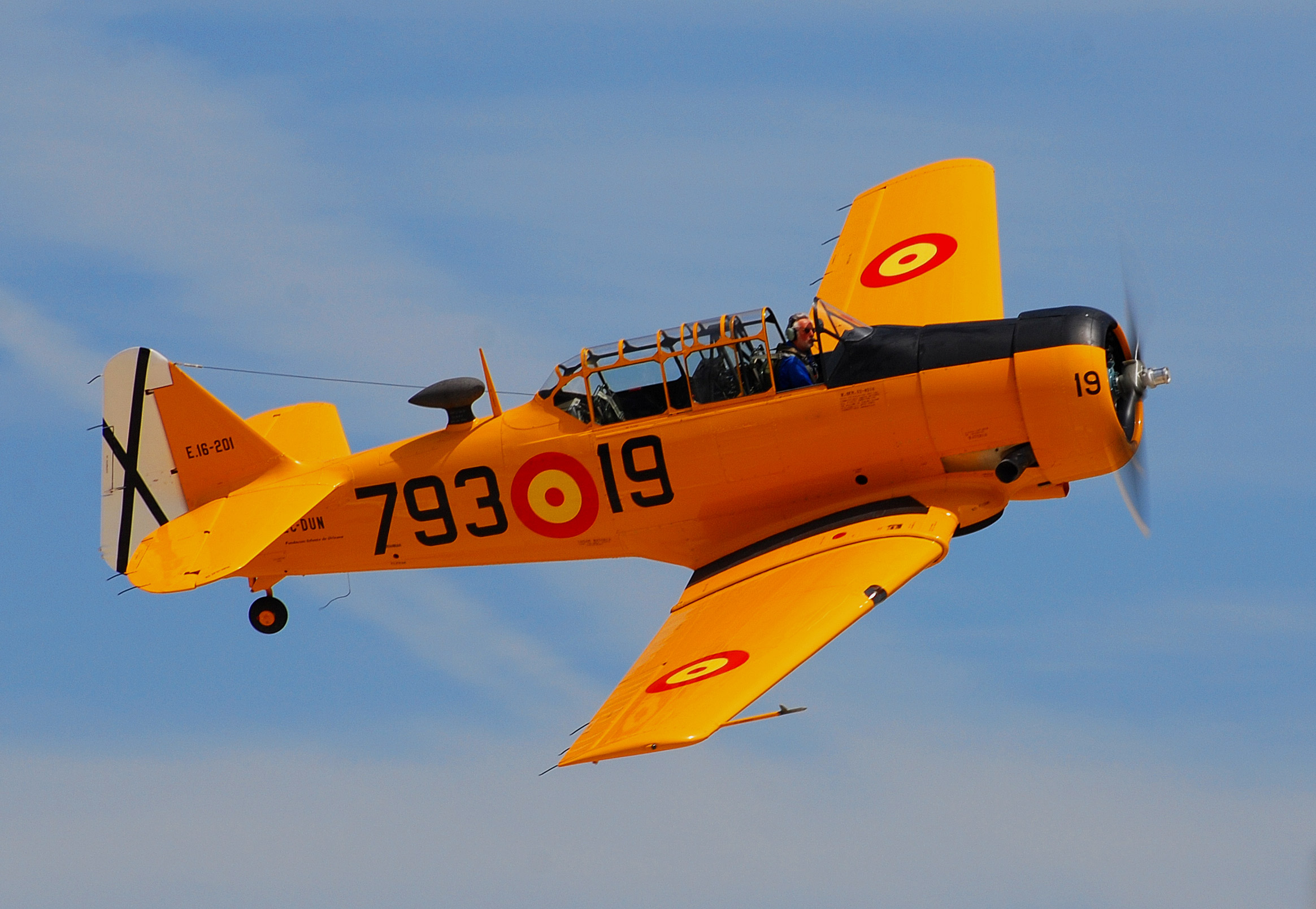
T-6 Texan of the Spanish Air Force

Peru used its seven T-6 fighter bombers in the Ecuadorian–Peruvian War equipped with two 7.65 mm (0.30 in) guns, while carrying up to four 116 lb (53 kg) bombs. Twenty AT-6s were employed by the 1st and 2nd Fighter Squadrons of the Syrian Air Force in the 1948 Arab-Israeli War, providing ground support for Syrian troops and launching airstrikes against Israeli airfields, ships, and columns, with one plane lost to antiaircraft fire. They also engaged in air-to-air combat on a number of occasions, with a rear gunner shooting down an Israeli Avia S-199 fighter.

The Israeli Air Force (IAF) bought 17 Harvards and operated nine of them in the final stages of the 1948 Arab-Israeli War, against the Egyptian ground forces, with no losses. In the Sinai Campaign, IAF Harvards attacked Egyptian ground forces in Sinai Peninsula with two losses.

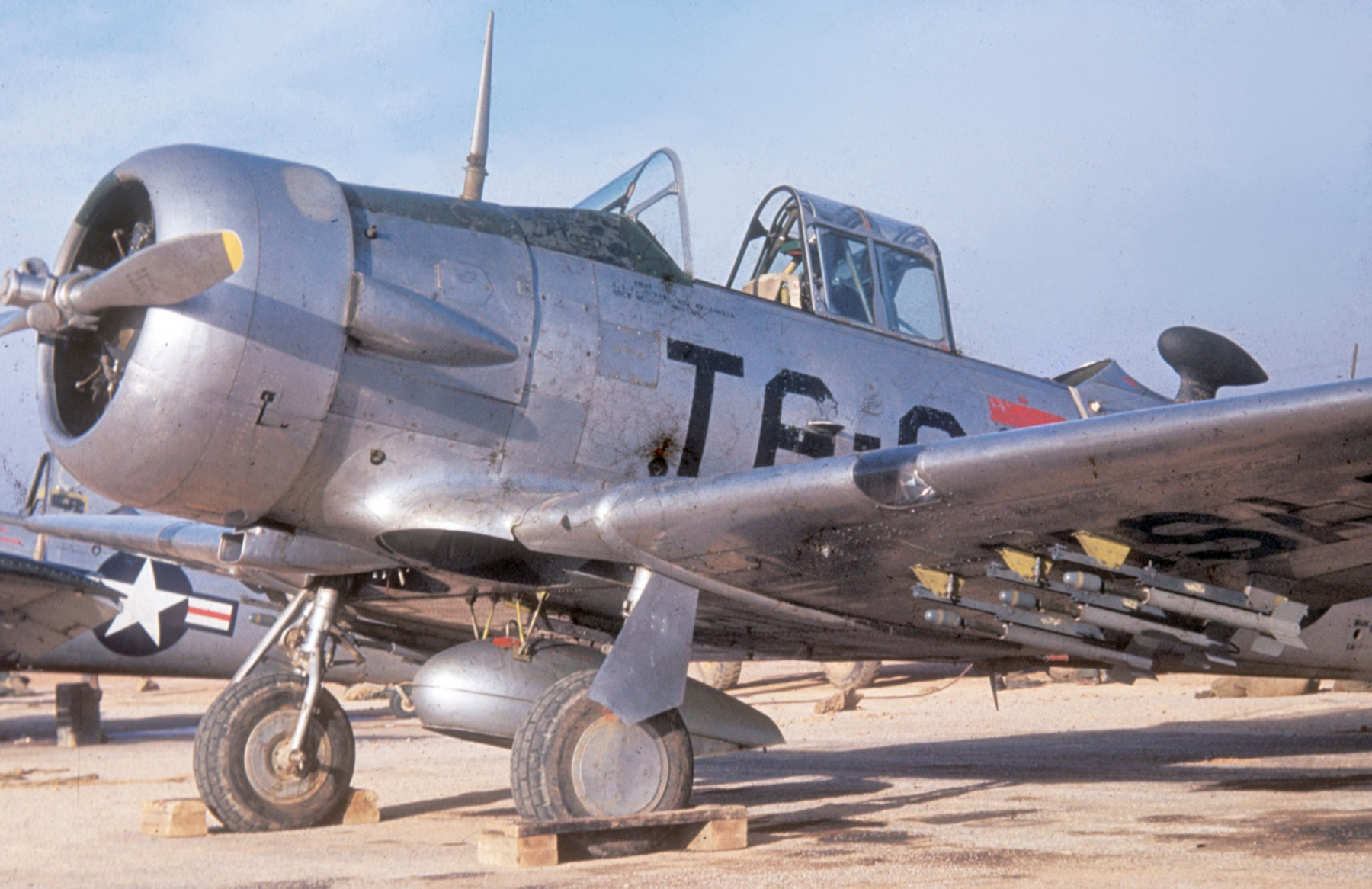
A USAF T-6 forward air control aircraft in Korea

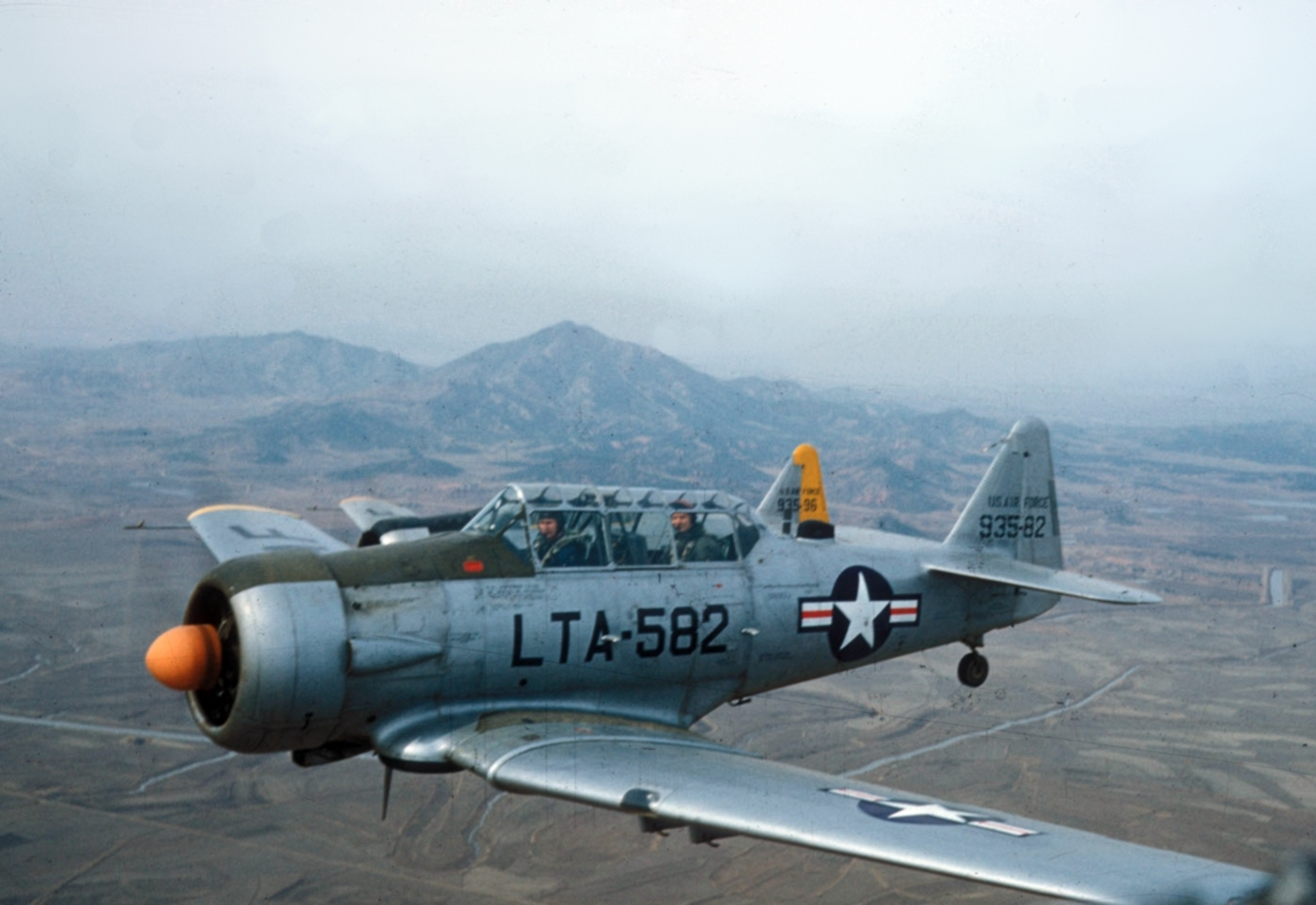
An LT-6G in flight over Korea in 1952

The Royal Hellenic Air Force employed three squadrons of British- and American-supplied T-6D and -G Texans for close air support, observation, and artillery spotting duties during the Greek Civil War, providing extensive support to the Greek army during the Battle of Gramos. Communist guerillas called these aircraft Ο Γαλατάς, O Galatas, 'The Milkman', because they saw them flying very early in the morning. After the "Milkmen", the guerillas waited for the armed Spitfires and Helldivers.

During the Korean War, and to a lesser extent, the Vietnam War, T-6s were pressed into service as forward air control aircraft. These were designated T-6 "Mosquitos".

No. 1340 Flight RAF used the Harvard in Kenya against the Mau Mau in the 1950s, where they operated with 20 lb (9.1 kg) bombs and machine guns against the rebels. Some operations took place at altitudes around 20,000 ft (6,100 m) above mean sea level. A Harvard was the longest-serving RAF aircraft, with an example, taken on strength in 1945, still serving in the 1990s (as a chase plane for helicopter test flights—a role for which the Shorts Tucano's higher stall speed was ill-suited).

The T-6G was also used in a light-attack or counterinsurgency role by France during the Algerian War in special Escadrilles d'Aviation Légère d'Appui (EALAs), armed with machine guns, bombs and rockets. At its peak, 38 EALAs were active. The largest unit was the Groupe d'Aviation Légère d'Appui 72, which consisted of up to 21 EALAs.

From 1961 to 1975, Portugal deployed more than 100 T-6Gs to perform counterinsurgency operations during the Portuguese Colonial War. During this war, almost all the Portuguese Air Force bases and air fields in Angola, Mozambique, and Portuguese Guinea had a detachment of T-6Gs.

On 16 June 1955, rebel Argentine Navy SNJ-4s bombed Plaza de Mayo in Buenos Aires, Argentina; one was shot down by a loyalist Gloster Meteor. Navy SNJ-4s were later used by the colorado rebels in the 1963 Argentine Navy Revolt, launching attacks on the 8th Tank Regiment columns on 2 and 3 April, knocking out several M4 Sherman tanks and losing one SNJ to antiaircraft fire.

In 1957–58, the Spanish Air Force used T-6s as counterinsurgency aircraft in the Ifni War, armed with machine guns, iron bombs, and rockets. The planes achieved an excellent reputation for reliability, safety, and resistance to damage.

The Pakistan Air Force used T-6Gs in the India–Pakistan war of 1971 as a night ground-support aircraft, hitting soft transport vehicles of the Indian Army. In the early hours of 5 December, during a convoy interdiction mission in the same area, Squadron Leader Israr Quresh's T-6G Harvard was hit by Indian antiaircraft groundfire and a shell fractured the pilot's right arm. Profusely bleeding, the pilot flew the aircraft back with his left hand and landed safely. The World War II-vintage propeller trainers were pressed into service and performed satisfactorily in the assigned role of convoy escorts at night. For the Indian Air Force, the T-6 based at Sulur remained the backbone of pilot training until they were replaced by the HPT-32 from the late 1970s. A single unit flies for the IAF heritage flight.

The South African Air Force received their first T-6s in October 1942 to be used by the Joint Air Training Scheme. By July 1944, 633 Harvard Mk IIA T-6s and IIIs had been shipped to South Africa with another 555 (379 MkIIAs and 176 Mk IIIs) to arrive by October 1945. Another 65 (AT-6Ds and 30 T-6Gs) were ordered between 1952 and 1956. The aircraft also saw some action during the South African Border War. The T-6 remained in service until 1995 as a basic trainer, mainly as a result of the United Nations arms embargo against South Africa's apartheid policies. They were replaced by Pilatus PC-7 MkII turboprop trainers.

=== Research testbed ===
The Harvard 4 has been used in Canada as a testbed aircraft for evaluating cockpit attitude displays. Its aerobatic capability permits the instructor pilot to maneuver the aircraft into unusual attitudes, then turn the craft over to an evaluator pilot in the "blind" rear cockpit to recover, based on one of several digitally generated attitude displays.

== Accidents and incidents ==
A known design concern with the T-6/SNJ series involves the fuel tank selector valve, which allows the pilot to switch between left, right, and reserve fuel tanks during flight. Over time, wear in the selector mechanism can introduce play in the valve shaft, potentially causing the valve to slip into an intermediate position that restricts fuel flow to the engine. Among T-6 hobbyist operators, a common practice has been to avoid switching the fuel tank selector during flight to mitigate this risk, although this workaround is not passed on to new owners.

In 1997, the Federal Aviation Administration (FAA) approved Supplemental Type Certificate SA00636CH, which modified the AT-6 fuel system to use only "On" and "Off" positions, eliminating the need to switch between tanks in flight. In February 2018, the FAA issued Special Information Bulletin SAIB CE-18-10 regarding a 2016 AT-6A accident attributed to the fuel selector valve.

On 16 October 2024, an SNJ-3 (registration OH-NAT) crashed shortly after takeoff from Räyskälä airfield in Finland when its engine lost power due to fuel starvation caused by a worn fuel tank selector valve. The pilot attempted to turn back to the runway, but the aircraft struck trees at the edge of the forest bordering the airfield. Both occupants were killed, and the aircraft was destroyed by the impact and a subsequent fire. The Finnish Safety Investigation Authority (OTKES) investigation found that the valve's selector shaft had 5.7 mm (0.22 in) of play in its angular gear, allowing it to drift to a position restricting fuel flow. OTKES recommended that the FAA inform SNJ/T-6 type owners and operators about the risks associated with the aging of the fuel tank selector valve mechanism.

== Operators ==
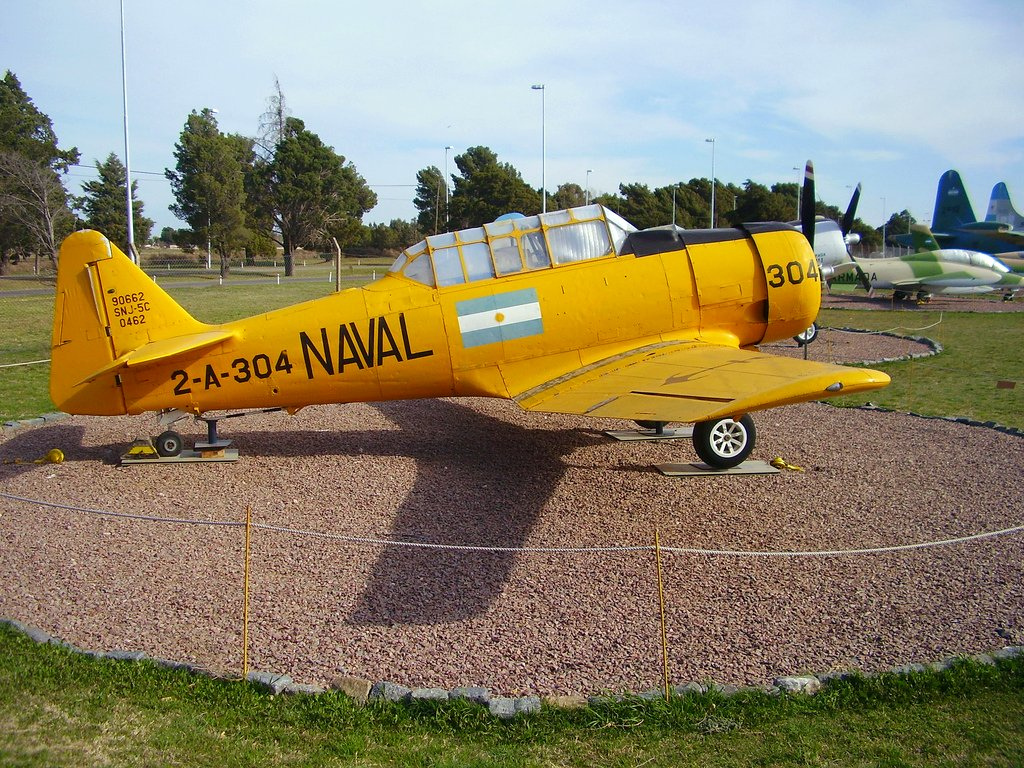
ex-Argentine Navy SNJ-4, Naval Aviation Museum, 2010

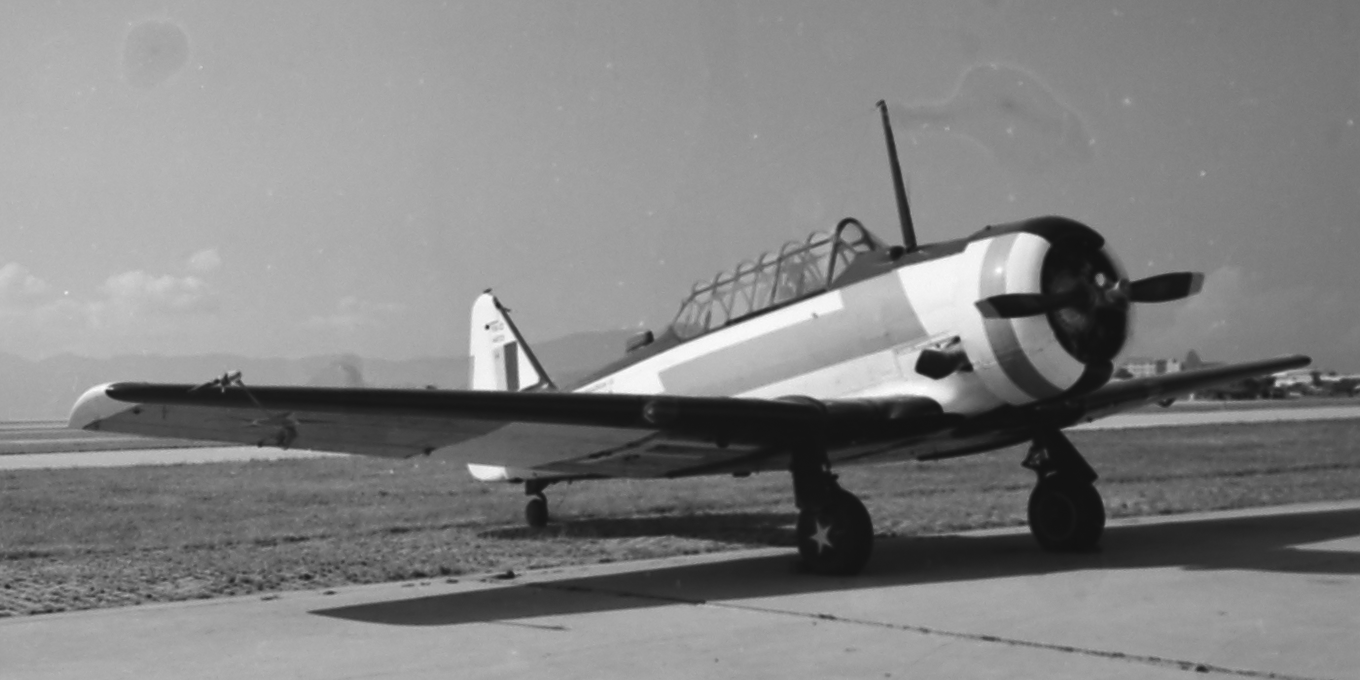
Brazilian Air Force T-6. Smoke Squadron, 1976. National Archives of Brazil

Argentina

- Argentine Army Aviation (SNJ-4)
- Argentine Naval Aviation (SNJ-4 and 30 SNJ-5Cs for carrier operations)

Austria

- Austrian Air Force

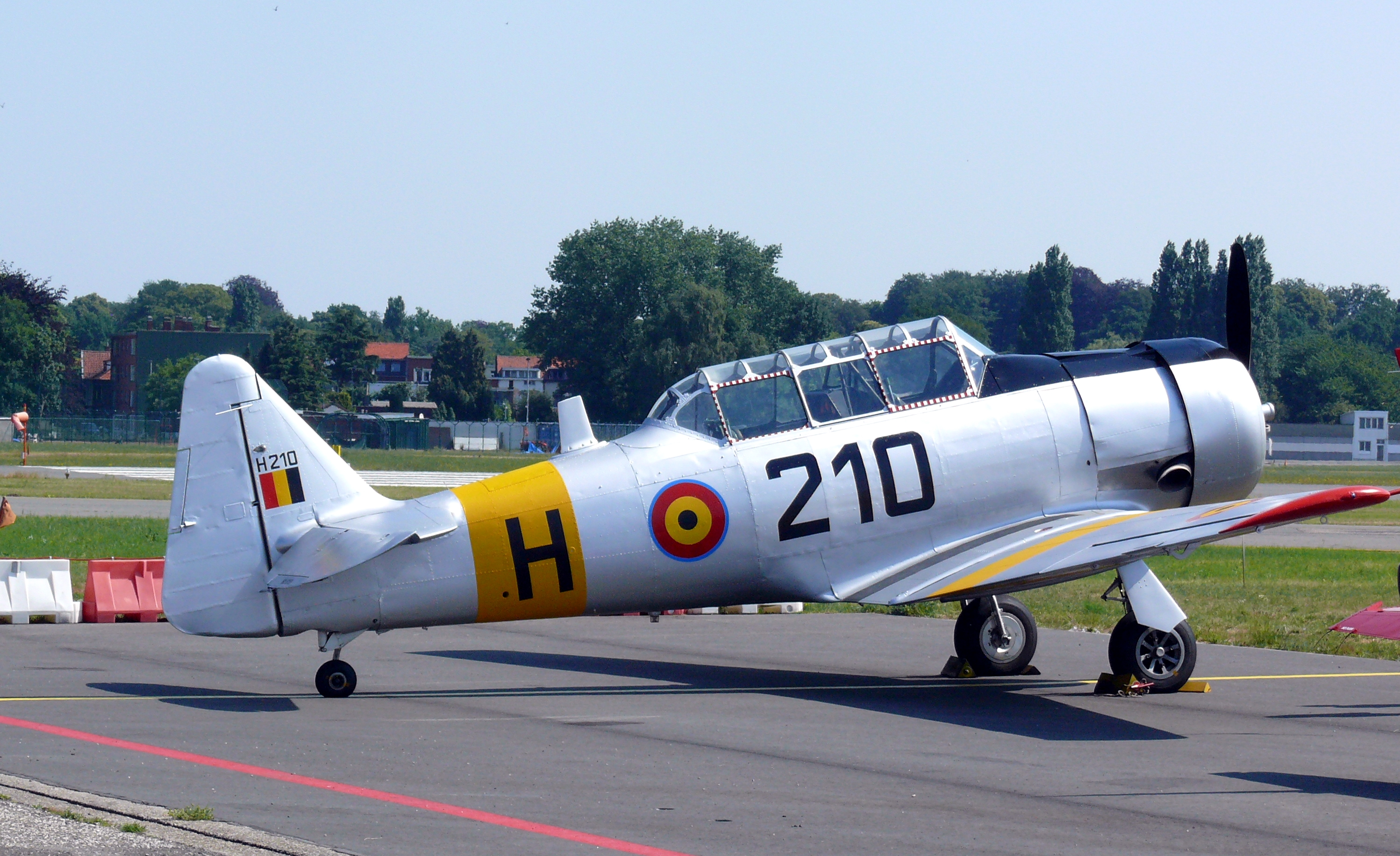
Belgian Air Force T-6G

Belgium

- Belgian Air Force

Biafra

- Biafran Air Force

Bolivia

- Bolivian Air Force
- Naval Aviation

Brazil

- Brazilian Air Force

Cambodia

- Royal Khmer Aviation (AVRK)

Canada

- Royal Canadian Air Force
- Royal Canadian Navy
- National Research Council (still in use)

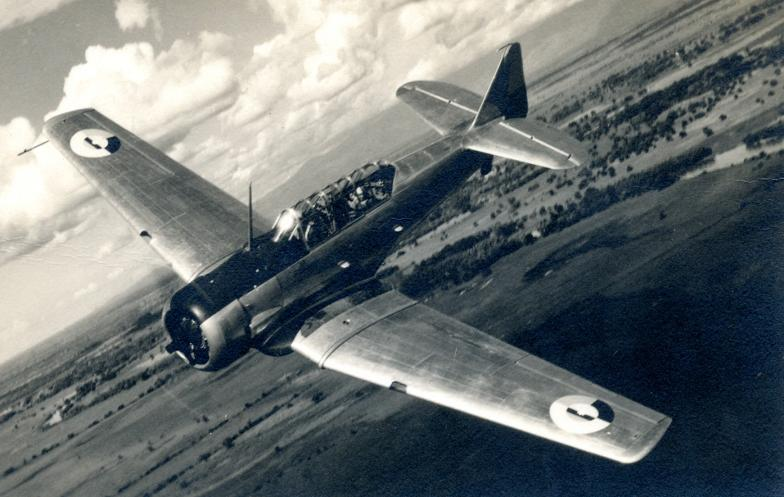
Colombian Air Force AT-6 Texan during World War II

Republic of China (Taiwan)

- Republic of China Air Force

Chile

- Chilean Air Force

Colombia

- Colombian Air Force

Republic of the Congo

- Congolese Air Force

Cuba

- Cuban Air and Air Defense Force

Denmark

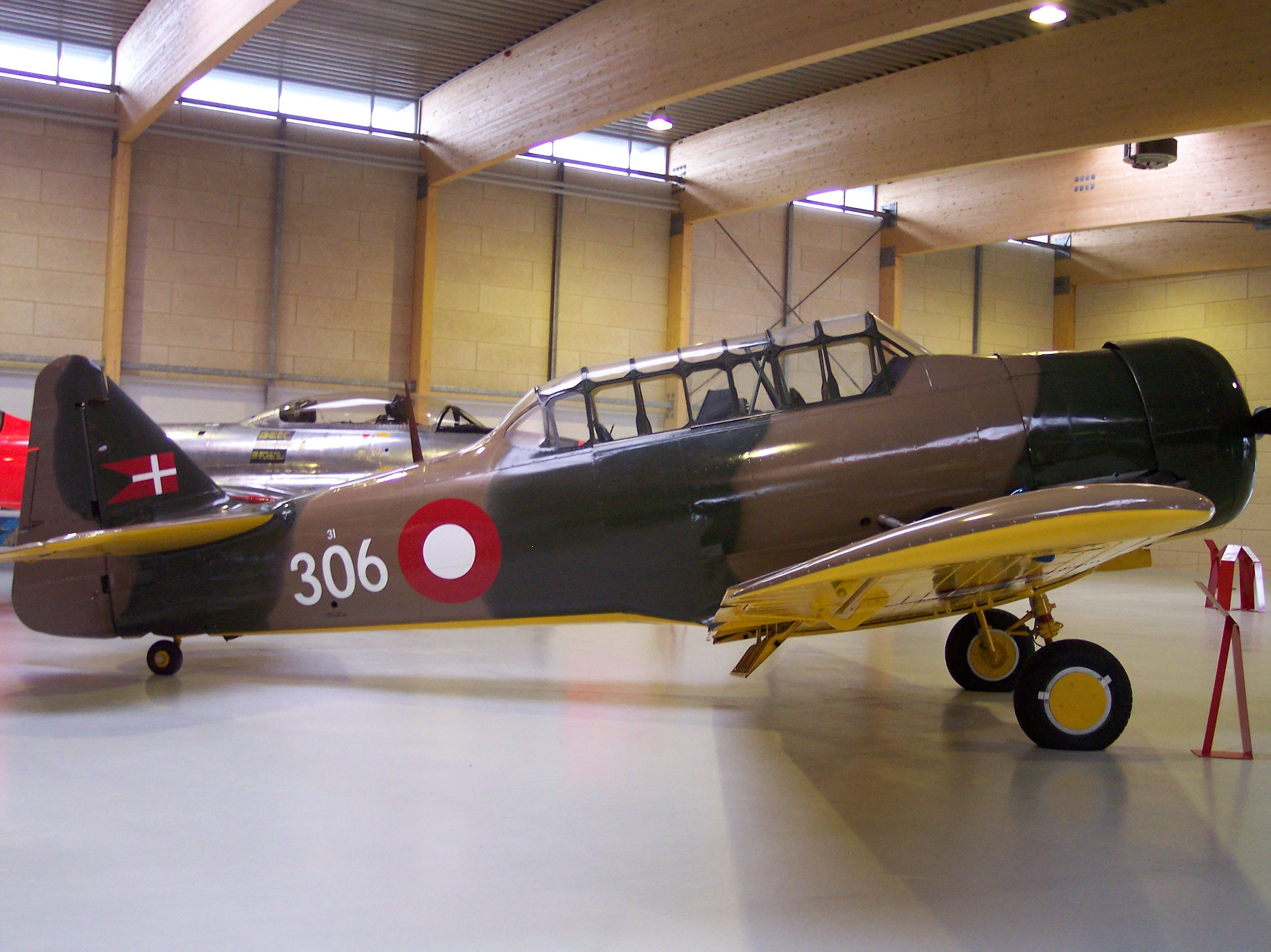
Danish Harvard II

- Royal Danish Air Force

Dominican Republic

- Dominican Air Force

El Salvador

- Air Force of El Salvador

France

- French Air Force

Gabon

- Gabon Air Force

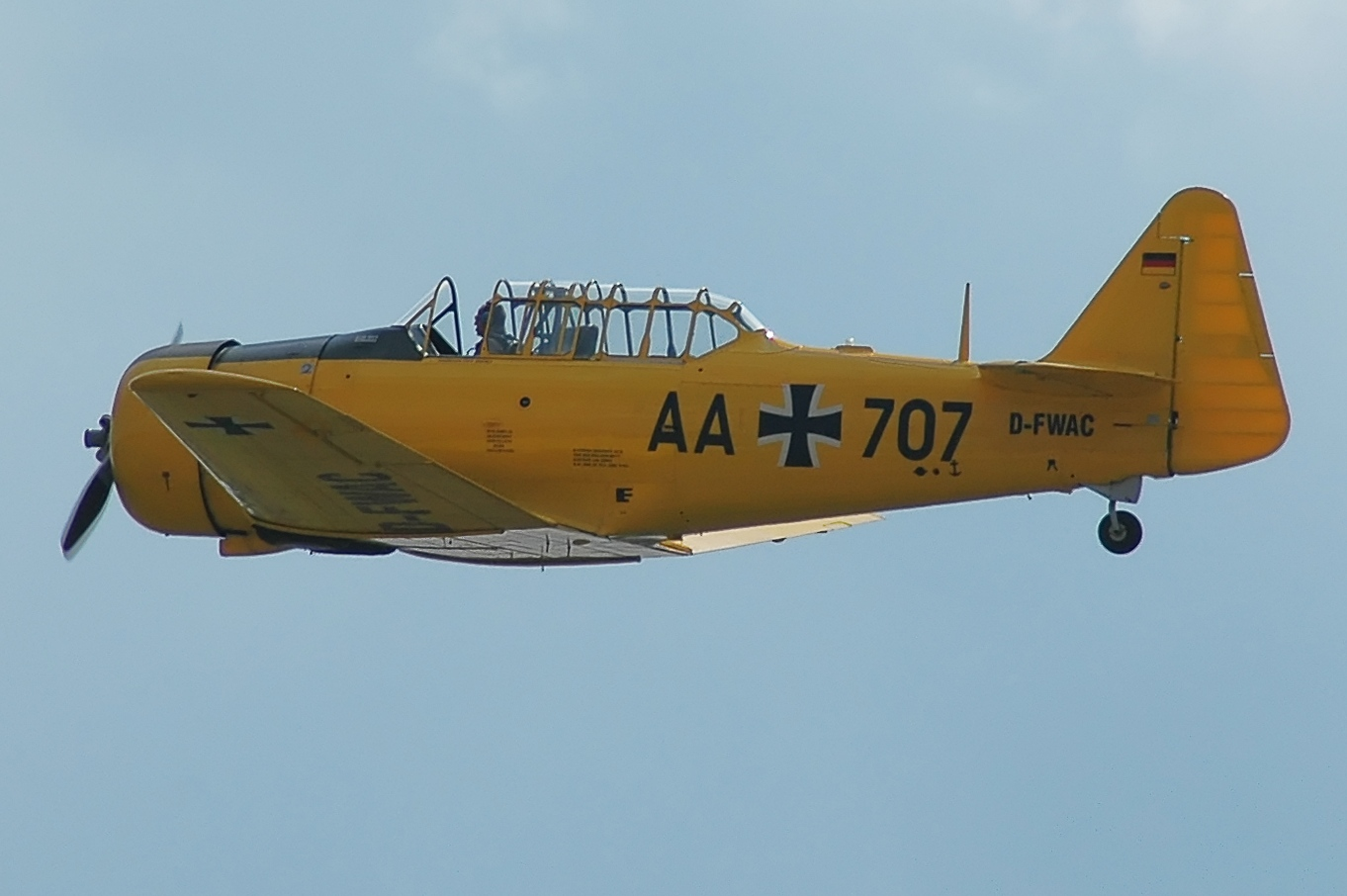
Restored T-6D in Luftwaffe markings

Germany

- German Air Force (Bundeswehr Luftwaffe)

Greece

- Hellenic Air Force

Haiti

- Haitian Air Corps

Hong Kong

- Royal Hong Kong Auxiliary Air Force

Honduras

- Honduran Air Force

India

- Royal Indian Air Force
- Indian Air Force

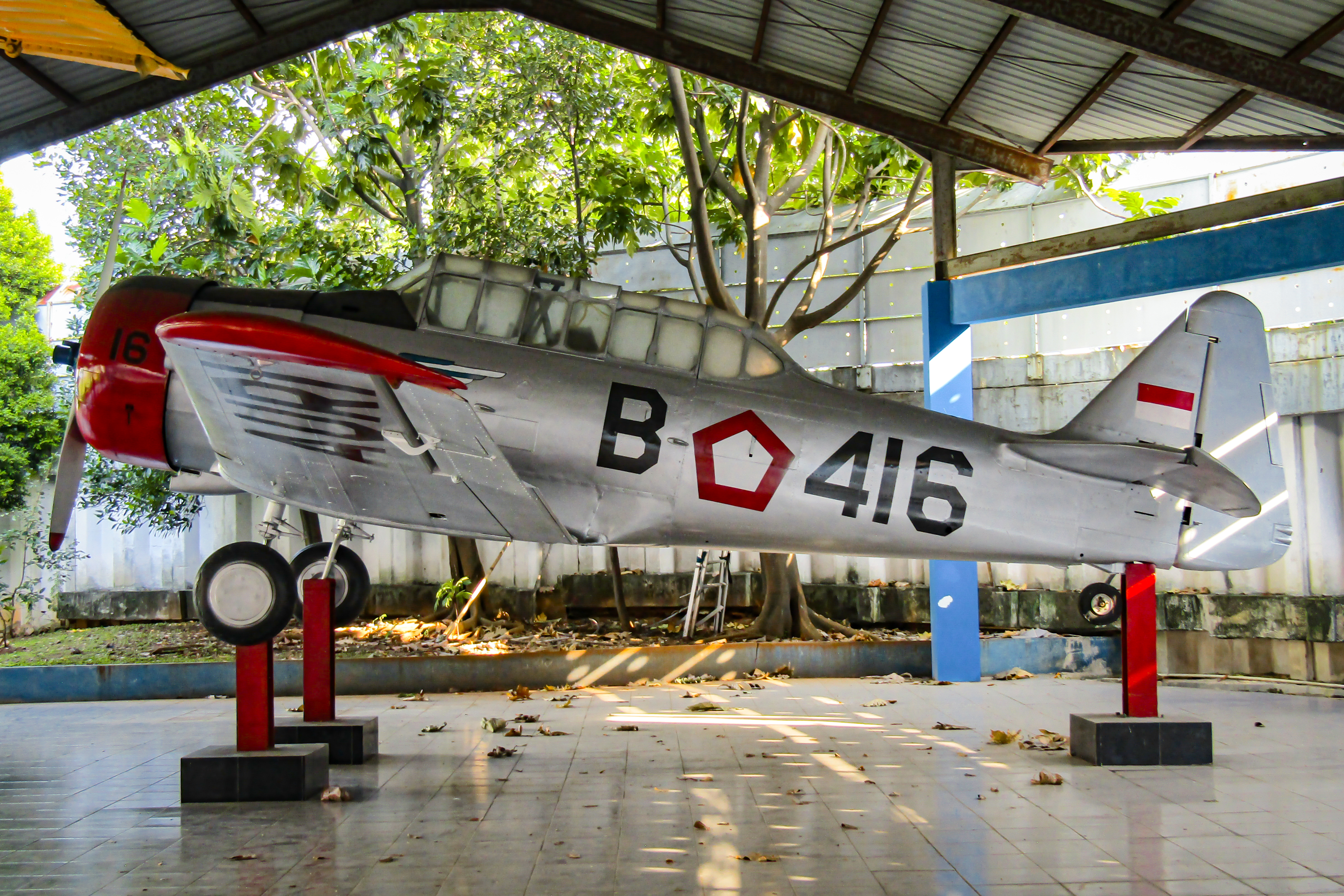
Indonesian Air Force Harvard IIB on display at Satria Mandala Museum

Indonesia

- Indonesian Air Force – received up to 40 Harvard IIBs from the Netherlands, bought 25 AT-6s from the United States

Iran

- Iranian Air Force

Iraq

- Iraqi Air Force – bought 15 aircraft in the early 1950s; six of them were donated to Lebanon in 1956

Israel

- Israeli Air Force

Italy

- Italian Air Force operated 238 aircraft from 1949 until 1979

Japan

- Japan Air Self-Defense Force
- Japan Maritime Self-Defense Force

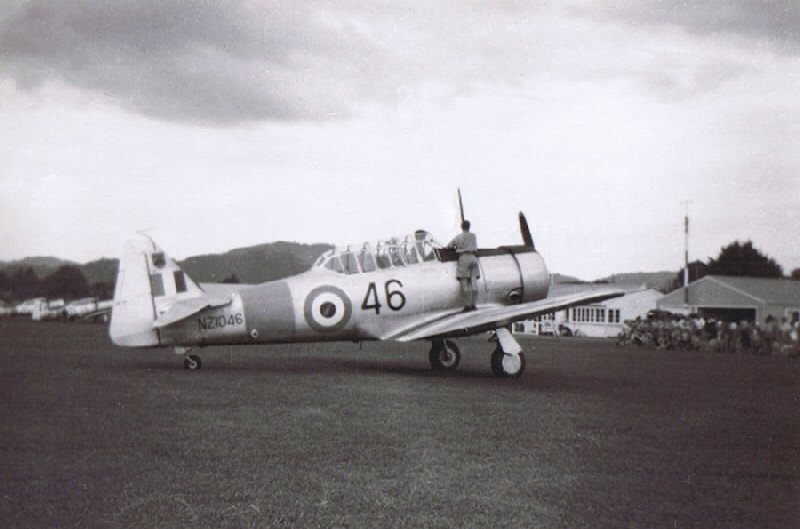
RNZAF Harvards at RNZAF Station Onerahi, Whangarei, New Zealand, 1961

Katanga

- Force Aérienne Katangaise

Lebanon

- Lebanese Air Force

Republic of Korea

- Republic of Korea Air Force

Kingdom of Laos

- Royal Lao Air Force

Mexico

- Mexican Air Force Total of 120 delivered, 47 AT-6 and 73 T-6C

Morocco

- Royal Moroccan Air Force

Netherlands

- Royal Netherlands Air Force
- Dutch Naval Aviation Service
- Royal Netherlands East Indies Army Air Force – Post war

Mozambique

- Mozambique Air and Air Defense Forces

New Zealand

- Royal New Zealand Air Force (1 maintained for historic flight)
- New Zealand Territorial Air Force

Norway

- Royal Norwegian Air Force (1 maintained for historic flight)

Nicaragua

- Fuerza Aérea de Nicaragua (G.N) Escuela Militar de Aviación 1948-1979

Pakistan

- Pakistan Air Force

Paraguay

- Paraguayan Air Force
- Paraguayan Naval Aviation

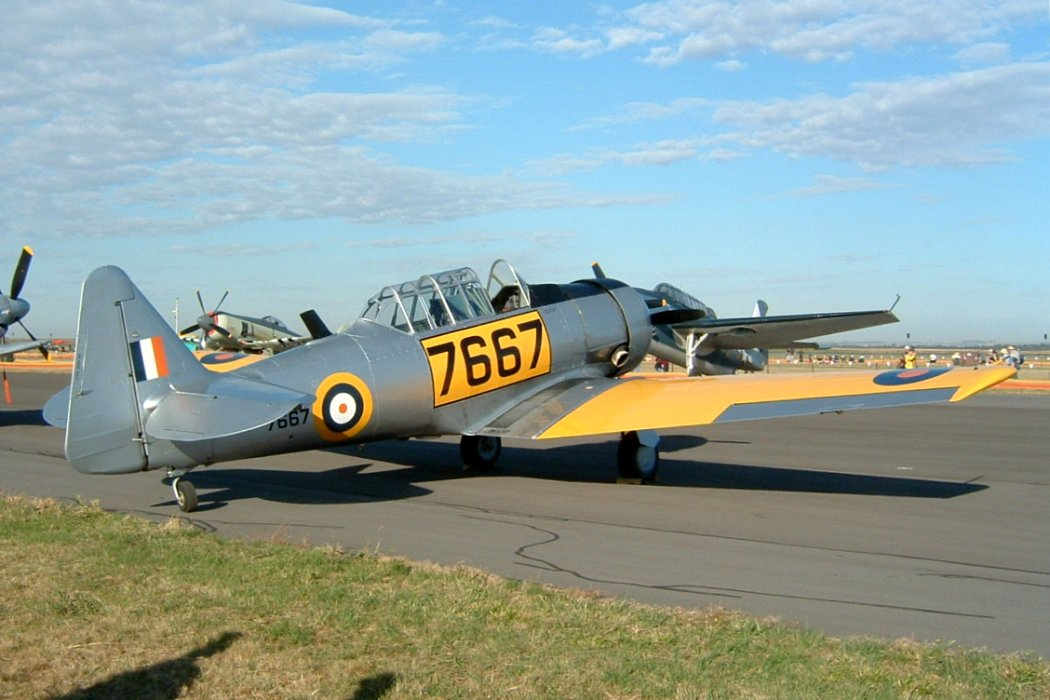
South African Air Force Harvard IIA (equivalent to the AT-6C) in World War II era markings

Philippines

- Philippine Air Force

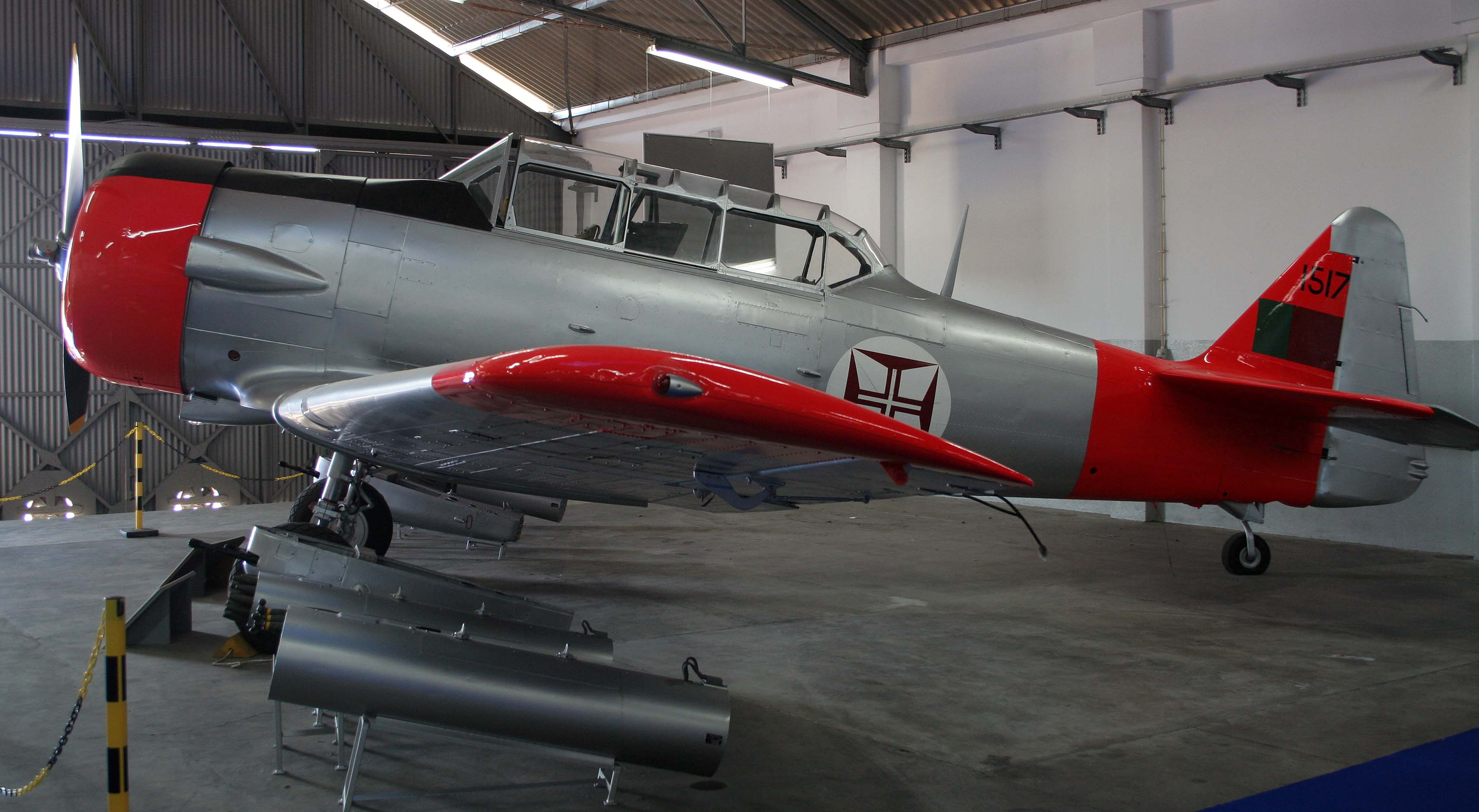
T-6G in Portuguese Air Force museum

Portugal

- Portuguese Air Force
- Portuguese Naval Aviation

South Africa

- South African Air Force

Southern Rhodesia

- Southern Rhodesian Air Force

South Vietnam

- Republic of Vietnam Air Force

Saudi Arabia

- Royal Saudi Air Force

Spain

- Spanish Air Force

Soviet Union

- Soviet Air Forces

Sweden

- Swedish Air Force 145 Harvard IIb as Sk 16A, 106 T-6A, T-6B, SNJ-3, SNJ-4 as Sk 16B and 6 SNJ-2 as Sk 16C.

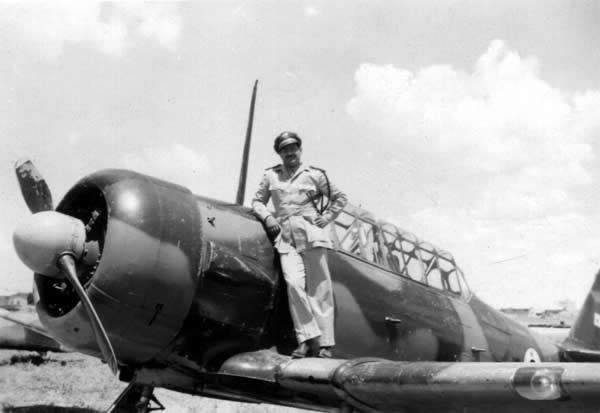
Syrian Harvard

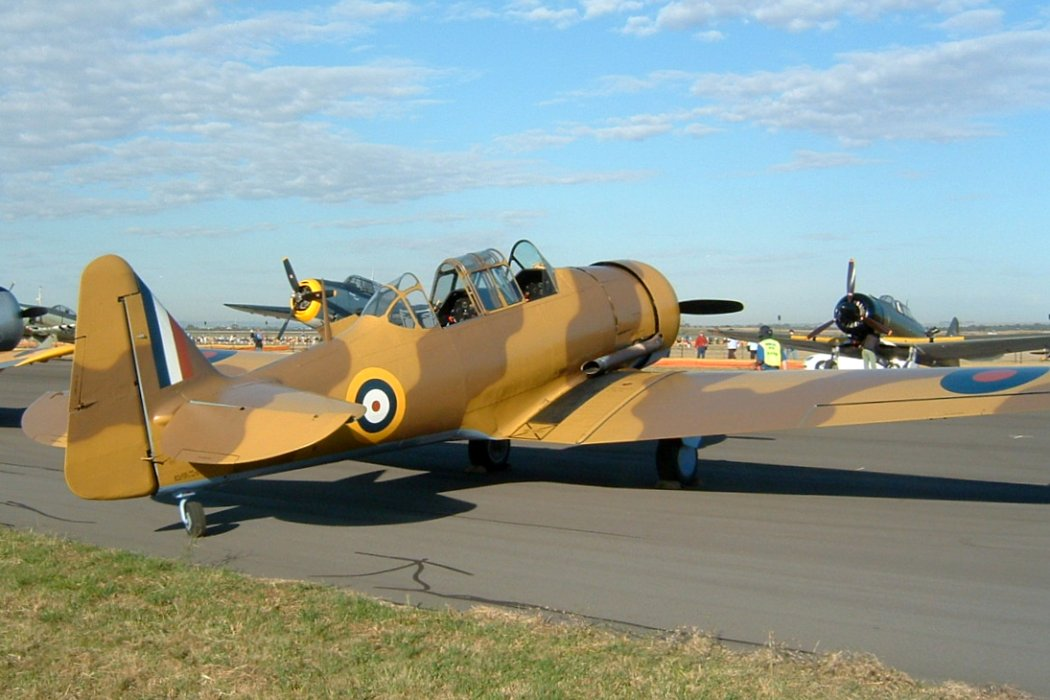
Restored Harvard II in RAF desert camouflage colours

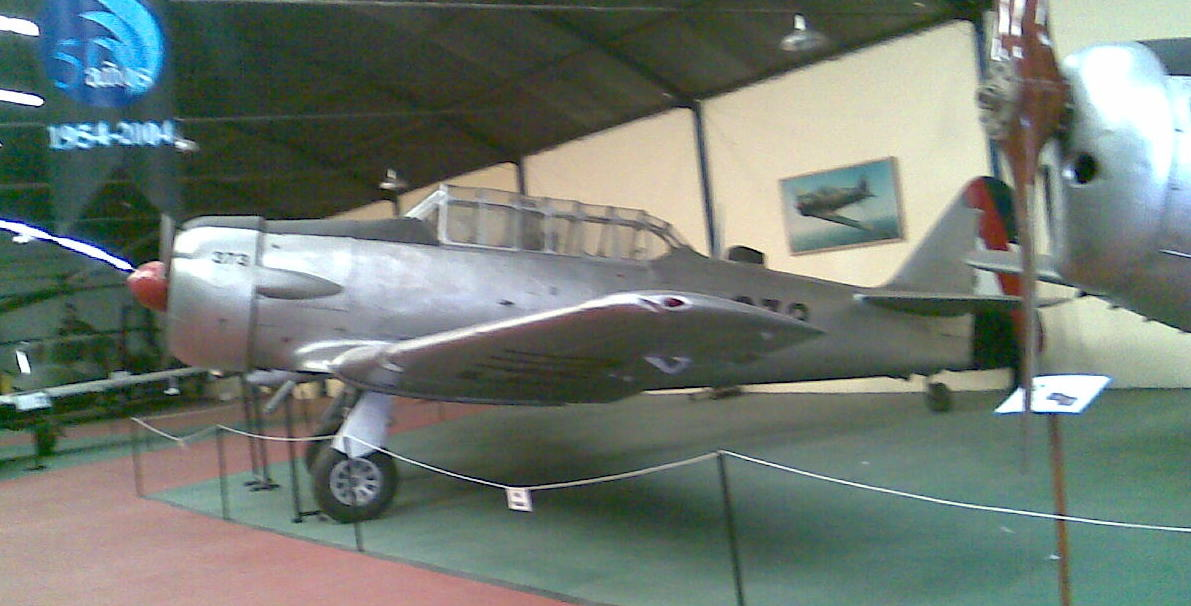
T-6G Texan in Uruguayan Air Force Aeronautic Museum in Montevideo, Uruguay.

Switzerland

- Swiss Air Force

Syria

- Syrian Air Force

Thailand

- Royal Thai Air Force
- Royal Thai Navy

Tunisia

- Tunisian Air Force

Turkey

- Turkish Air Force: 196 planes of various types

United Kingdom

- Royal Air Force
- Royal Navy
- Qinetiq (retired in 2016)

United States

- United States Army Air Corps/Army Air Forces
- United States Air Force
- United States Navy
- United States Marine Corps
- United States Coast Guard

Uruguay

- Uruguayan Air Force
- Aviacion Naval Uruguaya

Venezuela

- Venezuelan Air Force

Kingdom of Yemen

- Yemeni Air Force

Yugoslavia

- SFR Yugoslav Air Force

Zaire

== Specifications (T-6G) ==
T-6G line drawing

Data from Jane's Fighting Aircraft of World War II

General characteristics

- Crew: two (student and instructor)
- Length: 29 ft (8.8 m)
- Wingspan: 42 ft (13 m)
- Height: 11 ft 8 in (3.56 m)
- Wing area: 253.7 sq ft (23.57 m^{2})
- Empty weight: 4,158 lb (1,886 kg)
- Gross weight: 5,617 lb (2,548 kg)
- Powerplant: 1 × Pratt & Whitney R-1340-AN-1 Wasp radial engine, 600 hp (450 kW)

Performance

- Maximum speed: 208 mph (335 km/h, 181 kn) at 5,000 ft (1,500 m)
- Cruise speed: 145 mph (233 km/h, 126 kn)
- Range: 730 mi (1,170 km, 630 nmi)
- Service ceiling: 24,200 ft (7,400 m)
- Rate of climb: 1,200 ft/min (6.1 m/s)
- Wing loading: 22.2 lb/sq ft (108 kg/m^{2})
- Power/mass: 0.11 hp/lb (kW/kg)

Armament

- Provision for up to 3 × 0.30 in (7.62 mm) machine guns

== In popular culture ==
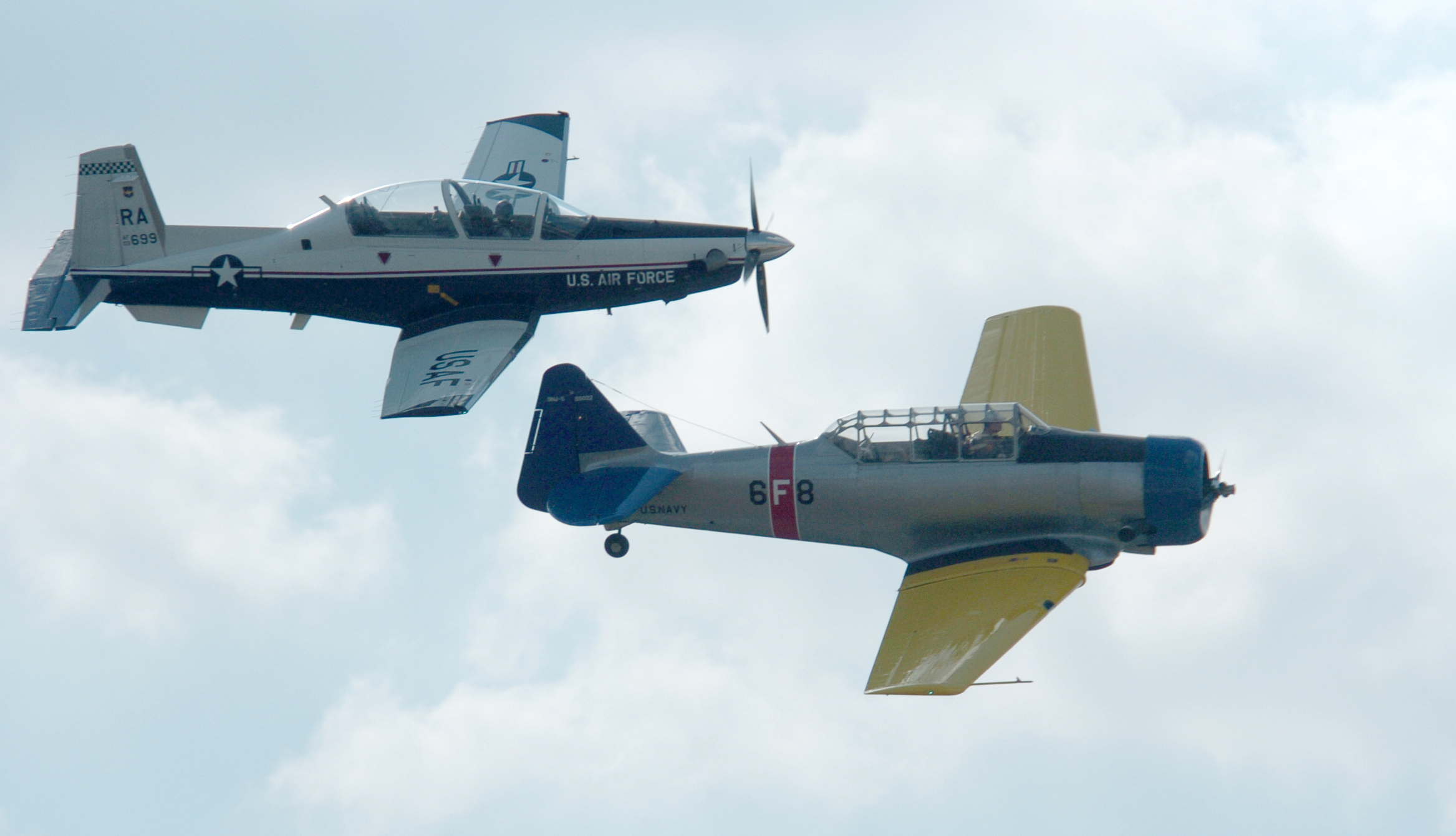
SNJ with the new T-6 Texan II, left

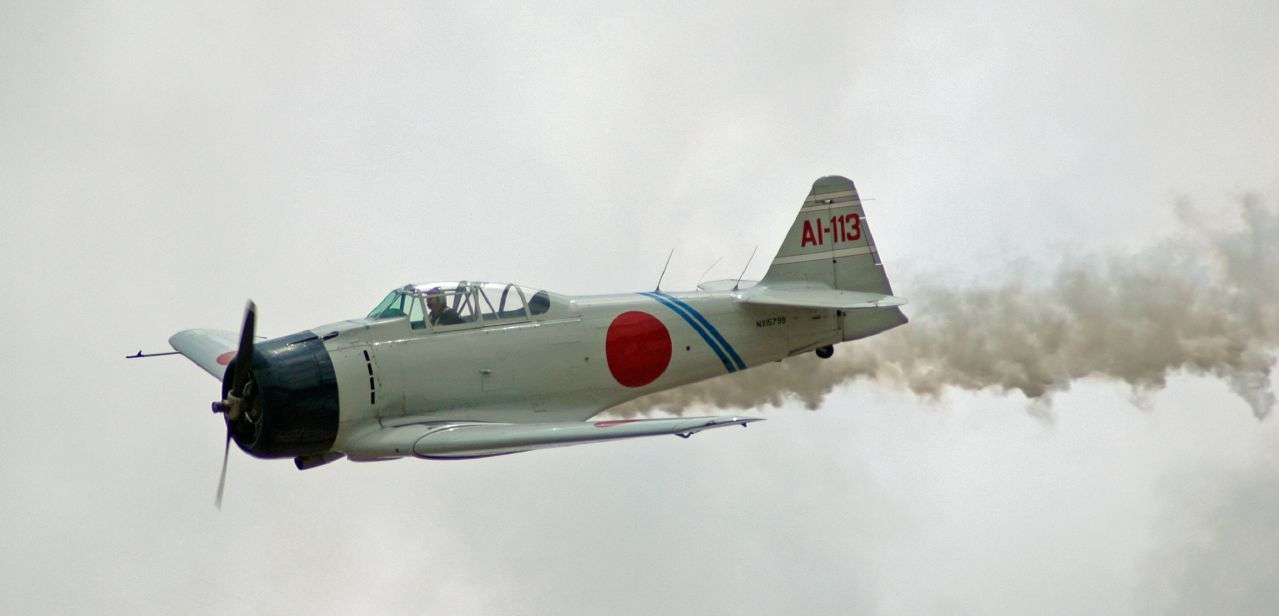
Harvard converted to resemble a Mitsubishi A6M Zero.

In the September 1944 issue of The Sportsman Pilot, USAAF Capt. Paul K. Jones' article stated, "The Six is a plane that can do anything a fighter can do—and even more. Naturally not as fast, she makes up for speed in her ease of handling and her maneuverability. She's a war machine, yes, but more than that she's a flyer's airplane. Rolls, Immelmans, loops, spins, snaps, vertical rolls—she can do anything—and do it beautifully. For actual combat, more guns, more speed and more power is needed. But for the sheer joy of flying—give me an AT-6."

After World War II, the National Air Races established a unique racing class for the AT-6/Texan/Harvard aircraft; this class continues today at the Reno National Air Races each year.

Since the Second World War, the T-6 has been a regular participant at air shows, and was used in many movies and television programs. Single-seat T-6s, painted in Japanese markings to represent Mitsubishi A6M Zero fighters and Nakajima B5N bombers, made appearances in A Yank in the R.A.F. (1941), Tora! Tora! Tora! (1970), Baa Baa Black Sheep (1976-1978), and The Final Countdown (1980). In A Bridge too Far (1977) the T-6 represented the razorback Republic P-47 Thunderbolt. Some were modified for the Dutch film Soldaat van Oranje (1977) to represent the Dutch pre–World War II fighter Fokker D.XXI.

The New Zealand Warbirds "Roaring 40s" aerobatic team use ex–Royal New Zealand Air Force Harvards. The Flying Lions Aerobatic Team uses Harvards acquired from the South African Air Force.

== See also ==
- Beechcraft T-6 Texan II
- North American T-6 Texan variants

Related development

- CAC Wirraway
- North American A-27
- North American BT-9
- North American NA-16
- North American NA-64 Yale
- North American P-64

Aircraft of comparable role, configuration, and era

- Arado Ar 96
- Fiat G.49
- FMA I.Ae. 22 DL
- Kyushu K10W
- Macchi MB.323
- Miles Master
- Percival Provost
- Piaggio P.150
- PZL TS-8 Bies
- Soko 522
- Valmet Vihuri
- VL Pyry
- Yakovlev Yak-11

Related lists

- List of aircraft of World War II
- List of military aircraft of the United States
- List of aircraft of the RAF
- List of aircraft of the RNZAF
