= Kyūshū K10W =

WW2 Japanese intermediate training aircraft

K10W
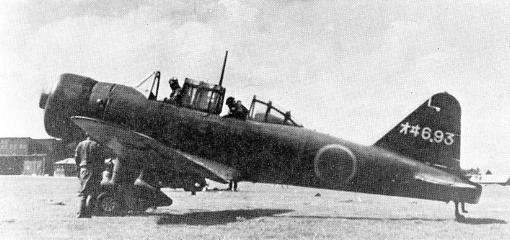

General information
- Type: Intermediate trainer (K10W1)
- Manufacturer: Kyūshū Hikōki K.K. and Nippon Hikōki K.K.
- Primary user: Imperial Japanese Navy Air Service
- Number built: 176

History
- Manufactured: February 1943 - August 1944
- Introduction date: 1943
- First flight: 1941
- Retired: 1945

The Kyūshū K10W (Allied reporting name "Oak") was a single engine, low wing fixed undercarriage monoplane training aircraft which served in the Imperial Japanese Navy Air Service in the latter part of World War II. Its full Navy designation was the Type 2 Land-based Intermediate Trainer (二式陸上中間練習機, Ni-shiki rikujō chūkan renshū-ki).

== Design and development ==
It was designed by the Kyūshū Aircraft Company to the 14-Shi Intermediate Trainer specification of mid-1939, which required a design similar to the North American NA-16 following the Mitsubishi's purchase of an NA-16-4R and an NA-16-4RW on behalf of the Japanese Navy. Design work commenced in January 1940, and the first prototype was ready by April 1941. Despite the similarity of the K10W to other contemporary Japanese aircraft, such as the Tachikawa Ki-55 and Mitsubishi Ki-51, it suffered from stall and stability problems that resulted in sixteen pre-production testing aircraft being built. Work at Kyuhsu on the Q1W maritime patrol bomber and K11W carrier crew trainer were given a higher priority. Kyūshū would build only nine production aircraft before production was transferred in 1943 to Nippon Hikōki (a small company that did a lot of subcontract work), who, in turn, built 150 examples before production ended in August 1944.

The Japanese had purchased two NA-16's, and Western sources have long believed that the K10W1 was a development of these. However, a close study of the "Oak", as it was code named by the Allies, shows that they shared nothing beyond a similar configuration. Whereas the NA-16's featured a steel tube structure covered with metal or fabric panels, the K10W1 was of flush riveted stressed skin construction throughout (excepting the fabric covered control surfaces) with a slightly smaller wingspan, narrower chord wings, a longer fuselage, and a higher aspect ratio tailplane. The entire cockpit was further forward, and the wings were swept forward rather than aft as on the NA-16. In addition, controls were run internally, and footrests retracted rather than being fixed. A version of the K10W built from wood was planned as the K10W2 but was never built.

== Operational service ==
The K10W1 was not popular with crews, possibly due to ongoing handling problems, and only served with a small number of units, which included the Oi, Go, Takarazuka, and 81st Kokutais (Naval Air Groups) as trainers. Japanese records do not show that any were used for Kamikaze attacks, although a small number were definitely used as target tugs for gunnery training and as unit hacks attached to operational bases, where they probably assisted in getting new pilots up to speed.

== Specifications (K10W1) ==
Data from Arawasi - From American Acorn to Japanese Oak

General characteristics

- Crew: 2
- Length: 8.83 m (29 ft 0 in)
- Wingspan: 12.36 m (40 ft 7 in)
- Height: 3.705 m (12 ft 2 in) rigging position
- Empty weight: 1,476 kg (3,254 lb)
- Gross weight: 2,033 kg (4,482 lb)
- Powerplant: 1 × Nakajima Kotobuki 2 Kai-1 9 cylinder air-cooled radial engine, 450 kW (600 hp)
- Propellers: 2-bladed wooden propeller

Performance

- Maximum speed: 294 km/h (183 mph, 159 kn)
- Range: 830 km (520 mi, 450 nmi)
- Service ceiling: 6,770 m (22,200 ft)
- Time to altitude: 5,000 m (16,000 ft) in 17 minutes 30 seconds
- Wing loading: 91.6 kg/m^{2} (18.8 lb/sq ft)

Armament

- Guns: 1 × 7.7mm machine-gun
- Bombs: 4 small practice bombs

== See also ==
- 1941 in aviation

Aircraft of comparable role, configuration, and era

- CAC Wirraway
- North American BT-9
- North American NA-16

Related lists

- List of aircraft of World War II
