= Hitachi Jimpu =

Jimpu
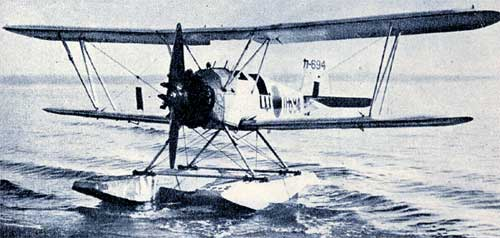
- A typical mounting on a Yokosuka K4Y1
- Type: 7-cylinder air cooled radial
- National origin: Japan
- Manufacturer: Gasuden/Hitachi
- First run: 1927
- Major applications: Yokosuka K2Y; Yokosuka K4Y
- Number built: 8,300 to 12,500

The Gasuden Jimpu or Kamikaze (later produced by Hitachi) was a Japanese seven-cylinder air-cooled radial aircraft engine from the 1920s, 1930s and 1940s. It was the first aircraft engine produced by Tokyo Gas and Electric (東京瓦斯電気工業, Tokyo Gasu Denki), often abbreviated to Gasuden, and the first production engine produced in Japan. It was produced in large numbers to power training and light aircraft before and during the Pacific War. First run in 1927, production of the engine totalled between 8,300 and 12,500 units.

== Design and development ==
The early development of aircraft in Japan was fully dependent on engines from abroad, although many of these designs were license built by Japanese companies. Gasuden was no exception, building Le Rhone rotaries in the early 1920s. However, by 1926, the company had gained enough experience to develop its own first engine. Taking inspiration from the Armstrong Siddeley Mongoose, the company developed a seven-cylinder star-shaped radial made of alloy and using an integral impellor-based carburettor. The prototype was first run in 1927 and was the first indigenous design to achieve production in Japan.

The resulting engine was a single row radial with seven cylinders of bore 115 mm (4.5 in) and stroke 120 mm (4.7 in). Running on 80 Octane fuel, the engine was rated at sea level at 150 hp (112 kW). The engine had no compressor, although some later models were fitted with a single speed mechanical supercharger to boost performance.

Initially, the engine was first known as the divine wind (神風, Kamikaze), but was later better known as the encampment wind (陣 風, Jimpu) as the range of engines produced by the company increased. Production ran from 1928 to 1944. Large numbers were delivered, primarily for training and other light aircraft. Amongst the more numerous were the Yokosuka K2Y2 Type 3, a derivative of the Avro 504N which was produced from 1929 to 1940, and the Yokosuka K4Y1 seaplane produced between 1933 and 1940, mainly by Watanabe. In May 1939, Hitachi acquired Tokyo Gas and Electric Company, merging the aeronautical part of the business with Hitachi Aircraft. The engine was rebranded Hitachi. Production totalled between 8,300 and 12,500 units.

== Variants ==
Jimpu 2
130–165 hp (97–123 kW)
Jimpu 3
150–180 hp (112–134 kW)
Jimpu 6
130–160 hp (97–119 kW)
Jimpu Kai
150 hp (112 kW)

The Jimpu 5 or Hitachi Tempu was a 9-cylinder derivative that produced between 240 and 280 hp (179 and 209 kW). The Tempu became an important engine for the company, taking 53% of production in July 1944.

== Applications ==
- Aichi AB-3 130 hp
- Aiba Tsubami IV 130 hp
- Gasuden KR-1 150 hp
- Gasuden KR-2 150 hp
- Hitachi T.2 150 hp
- Kawanishi K8K1 160 hp
- Tachikawa KKY-2 150 hp
- Tachikawa R-38 150 hp
- Watanabe K8W1 160 hp
- Yokosuka E6Y 160 hp
- Yokosuka K2Y2 130 hp
- Yokosuka K4Y1 130 hp

== Specifications ==
Data from Japanese Aero-Engines 1910–1945.

=== General characteristics ===
- Type: 7-cylinder, single row, air cooled radial engine
- Bore: 115 mm (4.5 in)
- Stroke: 120 mm (4.7 in)
- Displacement: 8.37 L (511 in^{3})
- Length: 885 mm (34.8 in)
- Diameter: 970 mm (38 in)
- Dry weight: 184 kg (406 lb)

=== Components ===
- Fuel type: 80 Octane petrol
- Reduction gear: Direct drive

=== Performance ===
- Power output:
  - Take-off: 160 hp (119 kW) at 2,050 rpm at sea level
  - Cruise: 130 hp (97 kW) at 1,800 rpm at sea level

== See also ==
Related lists

- List of aircraft engines
