= Kyūshū Q1W Tōkai =

Japanese anti-submarine patrol aircraft

Q1W Tōkai
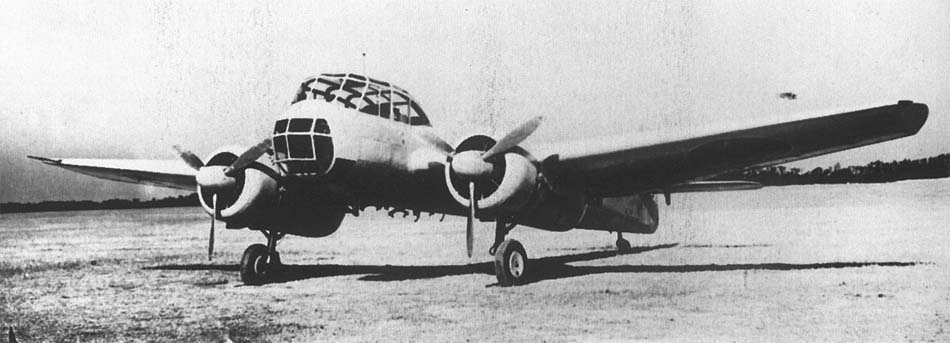
- A Kyūshū Q1W1

General information
- Type: Anti-submarine light bomber
- Manufacturer: Kyūshū Aircraft Company
- Primary user: Imperial Japanese Navy
- Number built: 153

History
- Introduction date: January 1945
- First flight: September 1943
- Retired: August 1945

The Kyūshū Q1W Tōkai (東海, Eastern Sea) was a land-based anti-submarine patrol bomber aircraft designed and produced by the Japanese aviation manufacturer Kyūshū Aircraft Company. The Allied reporting name was "Lorna".

The Tōkai was developed in response to an Imperial Japanese Navy (IJN) requirement for a dedicated anti-submarine aircraft during World War II. Although somewhat similar in appearance to the Junkers Ju 88 medium bomber operated by the Luftwaffe, the Q1W was a much smaller aircraft with significantly different design details. It was powered by a pair of relatively low-power Hitachi GK2 Amakaze 31 radial engines and capable of flying for long periods at low speeds. The Tōkai was provisioned with a Type 3 radar unit and a magnetic anomaly detector; it could strike detected submarines with 250 kg (551 lb) depth charges.

The first prototype was completed in September 1943, and quantity production was authorised in early 1944; however, few aircraft were produced due to the Pacific War having gone poorly for Imperial Japan. Introduced in 1945 as the Navy Patrol Plane Tokai (Eastern Sea) Model 11, it was normally used to protect Japanese convoys, but proved to be extremely vulnerable when intercepted by Allied fighters. The Tōkai had a relatively brief service history prior to the Surrender of Japan, which ended the conflict and led to all remaining aircraft being swiftly decommissioned. No examples have been preserved.

== Design and development ==
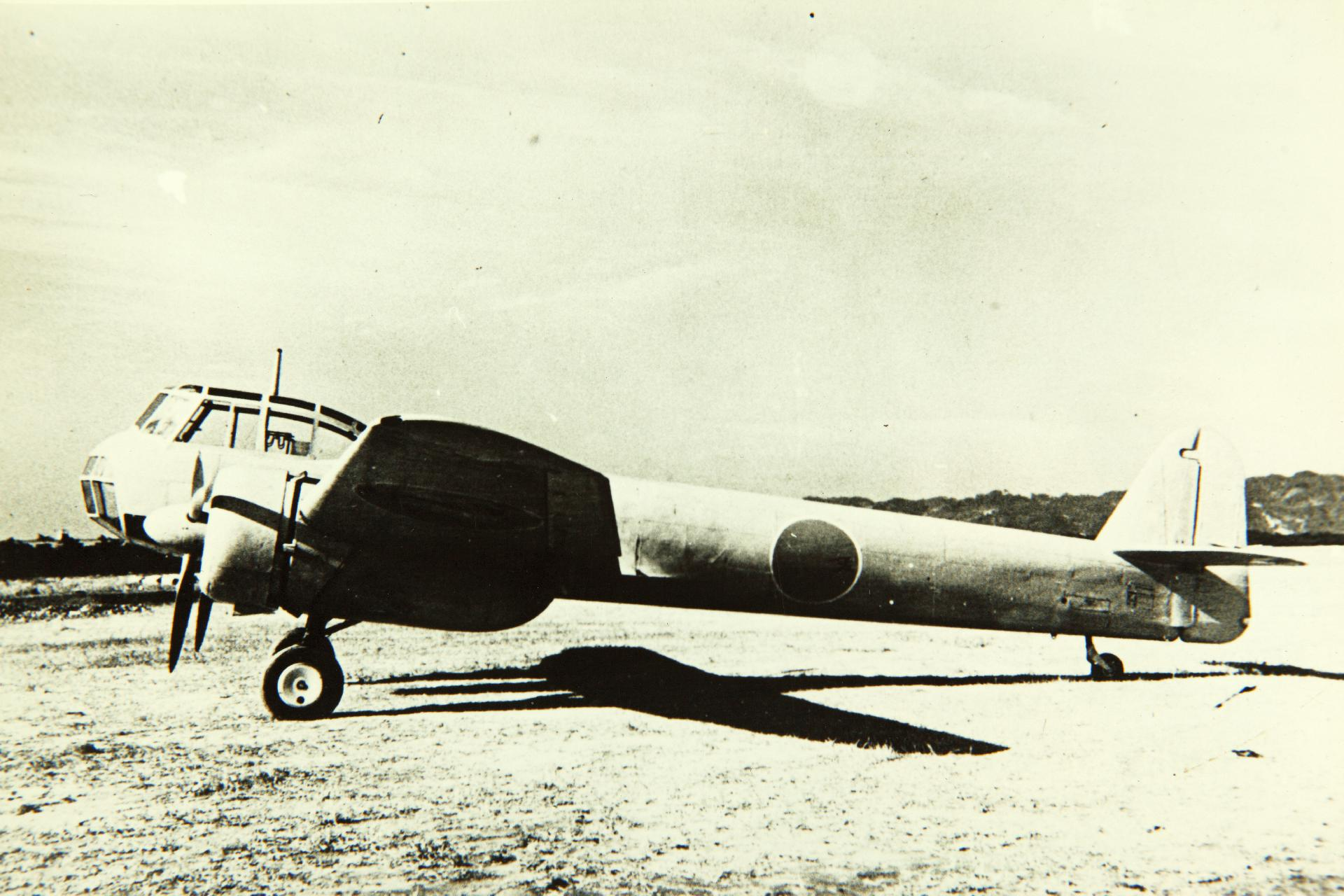
Kyūshū Q1W Tōkai maritime reconnaissance

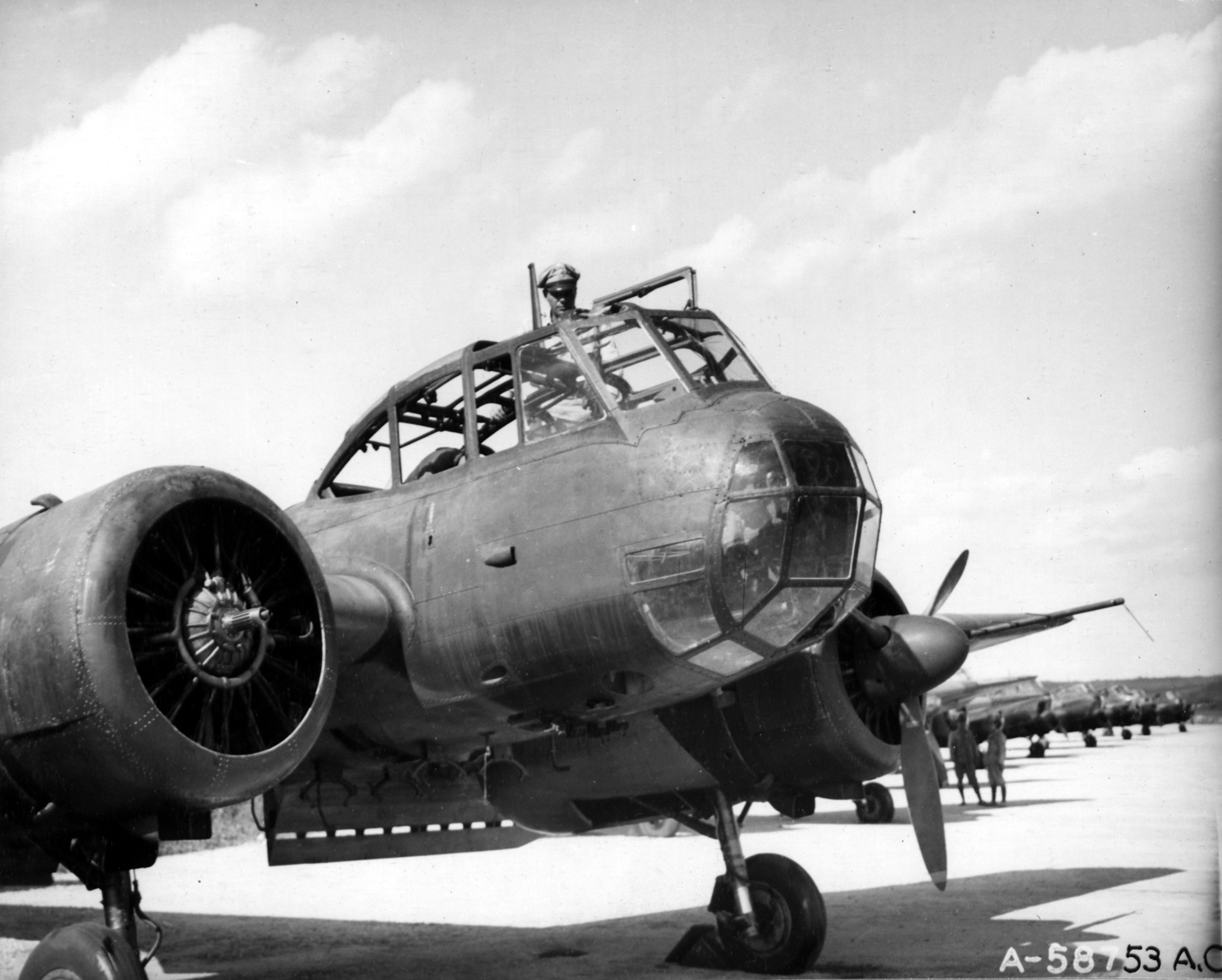
Captured Kyūshū Q1W examined by US personnel in 1945

The origins of the Q1W Tōkai can be traced back to 1942 and the early months of the Pacific War; live combat experiences with the Allies had led several officers within the Imperial Japanese Navy (IJN) to recognise the value of purpose-built aircraft to perform anti-submarine warfare (ASW) missions. Accordingly, the 17-Shi specification was issued, seeking a three-seat aircraft that possessed a relatively long range while capable of flying at low speeds. The desired attack profile of the envisioned aircraft involved a fairly steep dive. The IJN also stipulated a compacted development timeframe in order to quickly introduce the type to service.

The Kyūshū Aircraft Company tasked its design team with producing a response; they decided to opt for a twin-engine configuration as well as a similar cockpit arrangement to Nazi Germany's Junkers Ju 88, the latter choice provided good external visibility and permitted easy communication amongst the aircrew. Measures were also incorporated to reduce production workload, such as the adoption of a constant taper along both the leading and trailing edges of the wing. Power was provided by a pair of Hitachi GK2 Amakaze 31 nine-cylinder radial engines, each capable of producing up to 610 hp and driving a three-bladed Variable-pitch propeller. To enable it to better detect submarines, the aircraft was equipped with a relatively bulky Type 3 radar set as well as magnetic anomaly detector apparatus. The standard armaments fitted included a single flexibly-mounted rear-facing 7.7 mm machine gun and a pair of 250 kg (551 lb) depth charges; the nose of the aircraft could fitted with up to two 20 mm Type 99 cannon.

In September 1943, the prototype was completed; it quickly demonstrated its ability to easily fulfil all of the IJN's specified requirements as well as that it possessed relatively pleasant handling characteristics. Initially receiving the designation Navy Experimental 17-Shi Patrol Plane from the IJN, the service authorised quantity production of the type as the Navy Patrol Plane Tokai (Eastern Sea) Model 11 in early 1944. The type was never available in large numbers due to the declining military position of Imperial Japan in the latter half of the Pacific War. Those aircraft that did enter service were stationed in Japan, Taiwan, and China, where they were typically tasked with the protection of Japanese convoys transporting badly needed raw materials, including oil, from the Dutch East Indies and the Malaya. They were not particularly effective operationally, as their slow speed and relatively meagre self-defence capabilities left them particularly helpless against Allied fighters.

Efforts were made to further develop the Tōkai. The Q1W2 Tōkai Model 21 featured a wooden rear fuselage, and the Q1W1-K Tōkai Ren (Eastern Sea Trainer) was intended to train electronic warfare operators; the latter never progressed beyond the prototype stage. Production of the type was terminated in August 1945 around the same time as the Surrender of Japan.

Several competitors to the Tōkai emerged around the same period; specifically, Kyūshū built the K11W1 Shiragiku, a bomber training plane (also used in Kamikaze strikes) and the Q3W1 Nankai, a specialized antisubmarine version of the K11W. The latter was of all-wood construction and was destroyed during a landing accident on its first flight. Another specific anti-submarine airplane was the Mitsubishi Q2M Tai'yō, which was derived from Mitsubishi Ki-67 "Hiryū" torpedo-bomber, but this did not progress beyond the preliminary design stage.

== Variants ==
Q1W1
One prototype.
Q1W1 Tōkai Model 11
Main production model.
Q1W2 Tōkai Model 21
Version with tail surfaces in wood, built in small numbers.
Q1W1-K Tōkai-ren
Trainer with capacity for four, all-wood construction. One prototype built.

== Specifications (Q1W1) ==
Data from Japanese Aircraft of the Pacific War

General characteristics

- Crew: 3
- Length: 12.09 m (39 ft 8 in)
- Wingspan: 16 m (52 ft 6 in)
- Height: 4.12 m (13 ft 6 in)
- Wing area: 38.2 m^{2} (411 sq ft)
- Empty weight: 3,102 kg (6,839 lb)
- Gross weight: 4,800 kg (10,582 lb)
- Max takeoff weight: 5,318 kg (11,724 lb)
- Powerplant: 2 × Hitachi GK2 Amakaze 31 nine-cylinder air-cooled radial engines, 455 kW (610 hp) each
- Propellers: 3-bladed variable-pitch propellers

Performance

- Maximum speed: 322 km/h (200 mph, 174 kn)
- Range: 1,342 km (834 mi, 725 nmi)
- Service ceiling: 4,490 m (14,730 ft)
- Rate of climb: 3.8 m/s (750 ft/min)
- Wing loading: 126 kg/m^{2} (26 lb/sq ft)
- Power/mass: 0.19 kW/kg (0.12 hp/lb)

Armament

- 1 × flexible rearward-firing 7.7 mm Type 92 machine gun
- 1 or 2 × fixed forward-firing 20 mm Type 99 cannon sometimes fitted
- 2 × 250 kg (550 lb) bombs or depth charges

Avionics

- Type 3 Model 1 MAD (KMX)
- Type 3 Ku-6 Model 4 Radar
- ESM Antenna equipment

== See also ==
Aircraft of comparable role, configuration, and era

- Douglas B-18B Bolo
- Lockheed Hudson
- Lockheed PV-1 Ventura

Related lists

- List of aircraft of World War II
