= Hitachi T.2 =

T.2

General information
- Type: Trainer
- National origin: Japan
- Manufacturer: Hitachi

History
- First flight: early 1940s

The Hitachi T.2 was a trainer aircraft built in Japan in the early 1940s. It was a conventional, single-bay sesquiplane with wings braced by N-struts. The pilot and instructor sat in tandem, open cockpits, and the undercarriage was of fixed, tailskid type.

== Specifications ==
General characteristics

- Crew: Two, pilot and instructor
- Powerplant: 1 × Gasuden Jimpu 3 , 82 kW (110 hp)
