= Watanabe K8W =

1930s Japanese trainer floatplane

K8W

General information
- Type: Floatplane trainer
- National origin: Japan
- Manufacturer: Watanabe
- Primary user: Imperial Japanese Navy
- Number built: 3

History
- First flight: 1938

The Watanabe K8W was a Japanese floatplane trainer designed and built by Watanabe for the Imperial Japanese Navy.

== Development and design ==
In 1937, the Imperial Japanese Navy drew up a specification for a 12-shi (Note: In the Japanese Navy designation system, specifications were given a Shi number based on the year of the Emperor's reign it was issued. In this case 11-Shi stood for 1936, the 11th year of the Shōwa era.) primary floatplane trainer to replace its Yokosuka K4Y or Navy Type 90 Primary Seaplane Trainer. The specification was issued to the established builders of aircraft for the Navy, Kawanishi and Watanabe and to the relative newcomer Nihon Hikoki (also known as "Nippi"). The specification required use of the same Gasuden Jimpu radial engine used by the K4Y, and the three designs showed little changes from the aircraft they were to replace.

Watanabe's design, which was given the short designation K8W1, was, like the other two designs, a single-engine biplane with a fabric-covered steel-tube fuselage and a wooden wing with two floats. The trainee and instructor sat in individual open cockpits. The first of three prototypes made its maiden flight in 1938. The Watanabe design was judged inferior to that of the Kawanishi design and thus did not enter production.

== Specifications ==
Data from

General characteristics

- Crew: 2
- Length: 8.70 m (28 ft 7 in)
- Wingspan: 10.00 m (32 ft 10 in)
- Wing area: 25.0 m^{2} (269 sq ft)
- Empty weight: 750 kg (1,653 lb)
- Gross weight: 1,015 kg (2,238 lb)
- Powerplant: 1 × Gasuden Jimpu 2 seven-cylinder air-cooled radial engine, 97–119 kW (130–160 hp)
- Propellers: 2-bladed wooden propeller

Performance

- Maximum speed: 170 km/h (106 mph, 92 kn)
- Cruise speed: 120 km/h (75 mph, 65 kn)
- Range: 420 km (260 mi, 230 nmi)
- Endurance: 4 hr
- Service ceiling: 3,500 m (11,500 ft)
- Time to altitude: 20 min to 3,500 m (11,500 ft)
