= Kyūshū K11W Shiragiku =

Japanese trainer aircraft

K11W Shiragiku
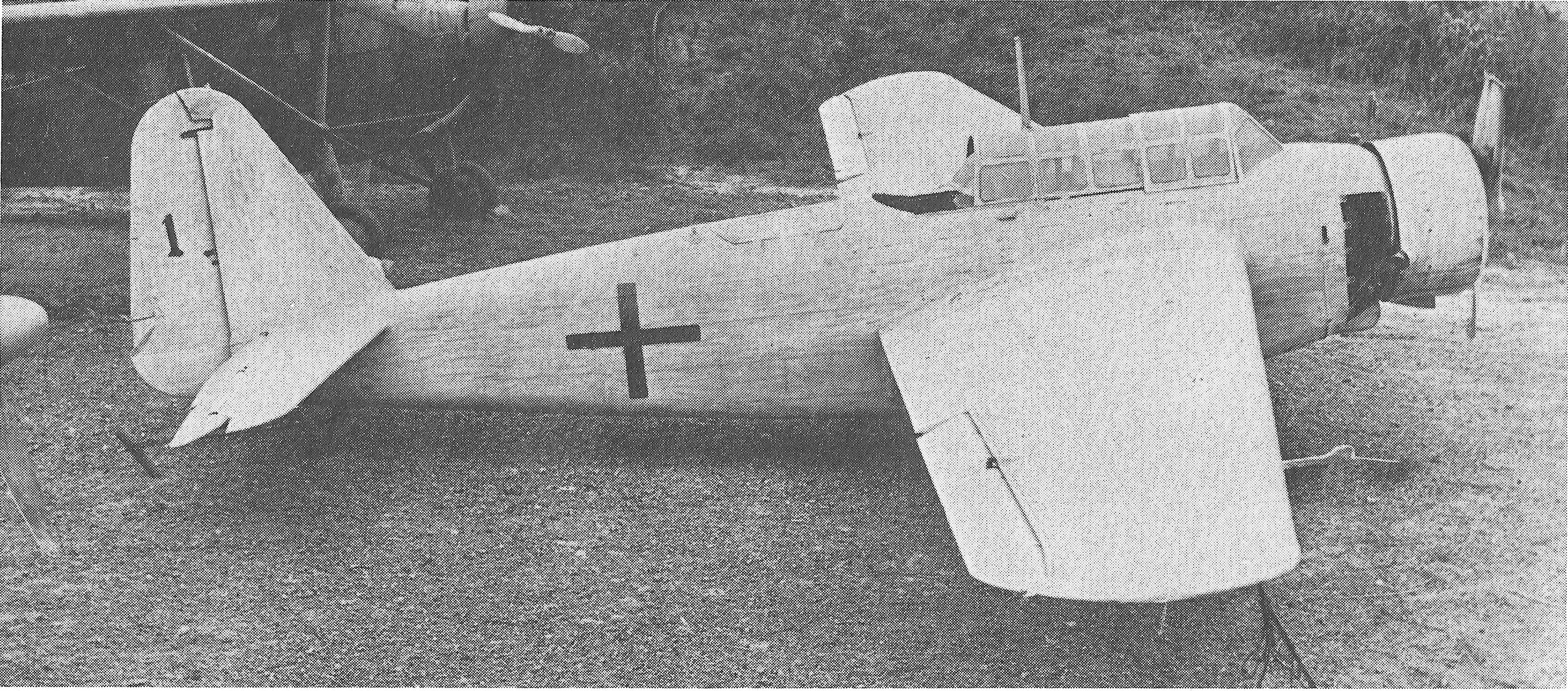
- Kyūshū K11W in 1945 surrender markings (painted white and with green crosses in the place of the red Hinomarus).

General information
- Type: Bomber crew trainer (K11W1)
- Manufacturer: Kyūshū Aircraft Company
- Primary user: Japan
- Number built: 798

History
- Manufactured: 1942-1945
- Introduction date: 1943
- First flight: November 1942

The Kyūshū K11W Shiragiku (白菊, White Chrysanthemum) was a land-based bombing trainer aircraft designed and produced by the Japanese aviation manufacturer Kyūshū Aircraft Company. As indicated by its Japanese designation, "training aircraft for on-board work (機上作業練習機, Kijō sagyō renshū-ki), it was designed to train crews in operating equipment for bombing, navigation, and communication, as well as navigation techniques.

Developed during the early 1940s and flown for the first time in November 1942, quantity production of the type started that same month, permitting it to enter service with the Imperial Japanese Navy Air Service (IJNAS) in mid-1943 and thus was active during the latter half of World War II. In addition to the standard K11W1 trainer variant, a limited number of K11W2 anti-submarine warfare (ASW) and transport aircraft were also produced. Numerous aircraft were modified to carry extra explosives and expended on kamikaze missions during the last stages of the Pacific War. Production of the type was maintained right up until the Surrender of Japan in August 1945.

== Design and development ==
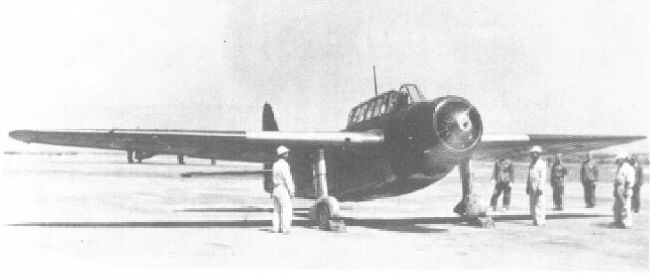
A Kyushu K11W Shiragiku, note the non-retractable landing gear.

The origins of the Kyūshū K11W can be traced back to late 1940 and the issuing of the 15-Shi specification by the Imperial Japanese Navy (IJN) that sought a modern replacement for the decade-old Mitsubishi K3M trainer aircraft for the training of complete bomber crews. The Watanabe Tekkōjo (later split off as the Kyūshū Aircraft Company) opted to respond with a clean-sheet design. In terms of its general configuration, the proposed aircraft featured a single engine, a mid-mounted wing, a relatively deep belly and a retractable undercarriage; it somewhat resembled the contemporary North American O-47 observation aircraft. As originally designed, it featured all-metal construction, except for the fabric-coverings of the flight control surfaces.

The crew were divided into two separate compartments; the pilot and radio operator/gunner seat beneath a glazed canopy above the wing while the trainee bombardier, trainee navigator, and instructor were located in the lower fuselage beneath the wing. Power was provided by a single Hitachi GK2B Amakaze 21 nine-cylinder radial engine, which drove a twin-bladed metal propeller. For armaments training, it was furnished with a single rear-facing flexibly-mounted 7.7 mm machine gun and the ability to carry a pair of 30 kg (66 lb) bombs.

In November 1942, the prototype performed its maiden flight; the subsequent flight test programme proceeded rapidly and was relatively trouble-free. This satisfactory performance resulted in the issuing of a production contract, which designated the type as the Navy Operations Trainer Shirigiku. The K11W entered IJN service in mid-1943.

As Imperial Japan's circumstances in the Pacific War deteriorated, several changes were made to the aircraft. An all-wooden variant, the K11W2, was introduced in limited numbers to conduct utility transport and anti-submarine warfare (ASW). Furthermore, the K11W served as the basis for the Q3W1 Nankai (南海, South Sea) anti-submarine patrol aircraft; differences included the adoption of retractable landing gear and its general enlargement, however, development of the Q3W1 was suspended in January 1945. One late-stage modification of the standard aircraft, to enable the carriage of a single 250 kg (551 lb) bomb, was made to make the type more suited to its improvised use for conducting kamikaze attacks.

Production of the type was terminated in August 1945 shortly after the Surrender of Japan.

== Variants ==
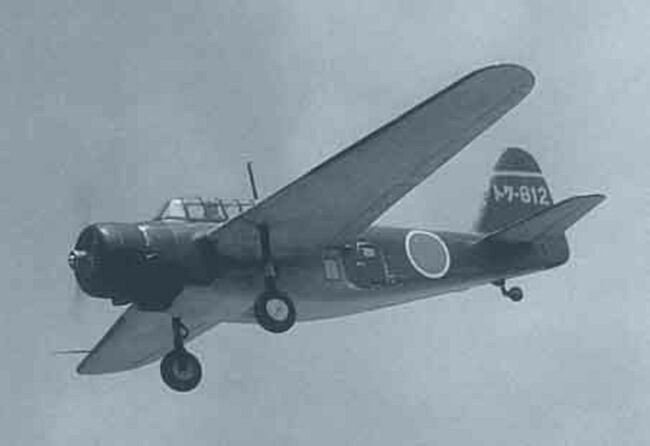
A Kyushu K11W Shiragiku of the Tokushima Kōkūtai (Naval Air Group of Tokushima) in flight.

- K11W1

The basic bomber crew trainer, of all-metal construction with fabric-covered control surfaces.

- K11W2

Anti-submarine warfare and transport version of all-wood construction.

- Q3W1 Nankai

Dedicated anti-submarine warfare aircraft based on the K11W. One built.

== Specifications (K11W1) ==
Data from Japanese Aircraft of the Pacific War

General characteristics

- Crew: five
- Length: 10.24 m (33 ft 7 in)
- Wingspan: 14.98 m (49 ft 2 in)
- Height: 3.93 m (12 ft 11 in)
- Wing area: 30.5 m^{2} (328 sq ft)
- Empty weight: 1,677 kg (3,697 lb)
- Gross weight: 2,640 kg (5,820 lb)
- Powerplant: 1 × Hitachi GK2B Amakaze 21 nine-cylinder air-cooled radial piston engine, 384 kW (515 hp)

Performance

- Maximum speed: 230 km/h (140 mph, 120 kn) at 1,700 m (5,600 ft)
- Cruise speed: 175 km/h (109 mph, 94 kn) at 1,000 m (3,300 ft)
- Range: 1,760 km (1,090 mi, 950 nmi)
- Service ceiling: 5,620 m (18,440 ft)
- Time to altitude: 3,000 m (9,800 ft) in 19 minutes and 35 seconds

Armament

- Guns: 1 × 7.7 mm rear-firing machine gun
- Bombs: 2 × 30 kg (66 lb) bombs on training role, or 1 × 250 kg (550 lb) bomb on kamikaze missions

== See also ==
Related lists

- List of aircraft of World War II
