= Kyushu Hikoki =

Japanese manufacturer of military aircraft

The Kyūshū Hikōki K.K. (九州飛行機, Kyūshū Aircraft Company Ltd) was a Japanese manufacturer of military aircraft during World War II. While it mainly manufactured other firms' designs, it was notable for the radical J7W "Shinden" fighter. Named after Kyushu island where the company was based.

The company originated from Fukuoka-based Watanabe Tekkōjo (Watanabe Steel Foundry), which started building aircraft in 1935. In 1943 the aircraft division was spun off as Kyūshū Hikōki, while the original company was renamed Kyūshū Heiki (Kyūshū Armaments).

After the war, the company was renamed Watanabe Jidōsha Kōgyō (Watanabe Automobile Industries) and manufactured automobile bodies and parts. It was dissolved in 2001.

== Products ==
- E9W - 1935 submarine-based reconnaissance floatplane
- J7W 震電 Shinden (Magnificent Lightning) - 1945 pusher fighter prototype
- K6W - WS-103 seaplane for Royal Siamese Navy
- K8W - 1938 floatplane trainer prototype, lost to the Kawanishi K8K
- K9W カエデ Kaede (Maple) - 1939 basic trainer; license-built Bücker Bu 131 Jüngmann
- K10W - 1943 intermediate trainer
- K11W 白菊 Shiragiku (White Chrysanthemum) - 1943 crew trainer
- Q1W 東海 Tōkai (Eastern Sea) - 'Lorna' 1945 ASW/patrol aircraft
- Q3W 南海 Nankai (South Sea) - 1945 ASW/patrol aircraft prototype based on the K11W
