= Kawanishi E11K =

Japanese flying boat

E11K
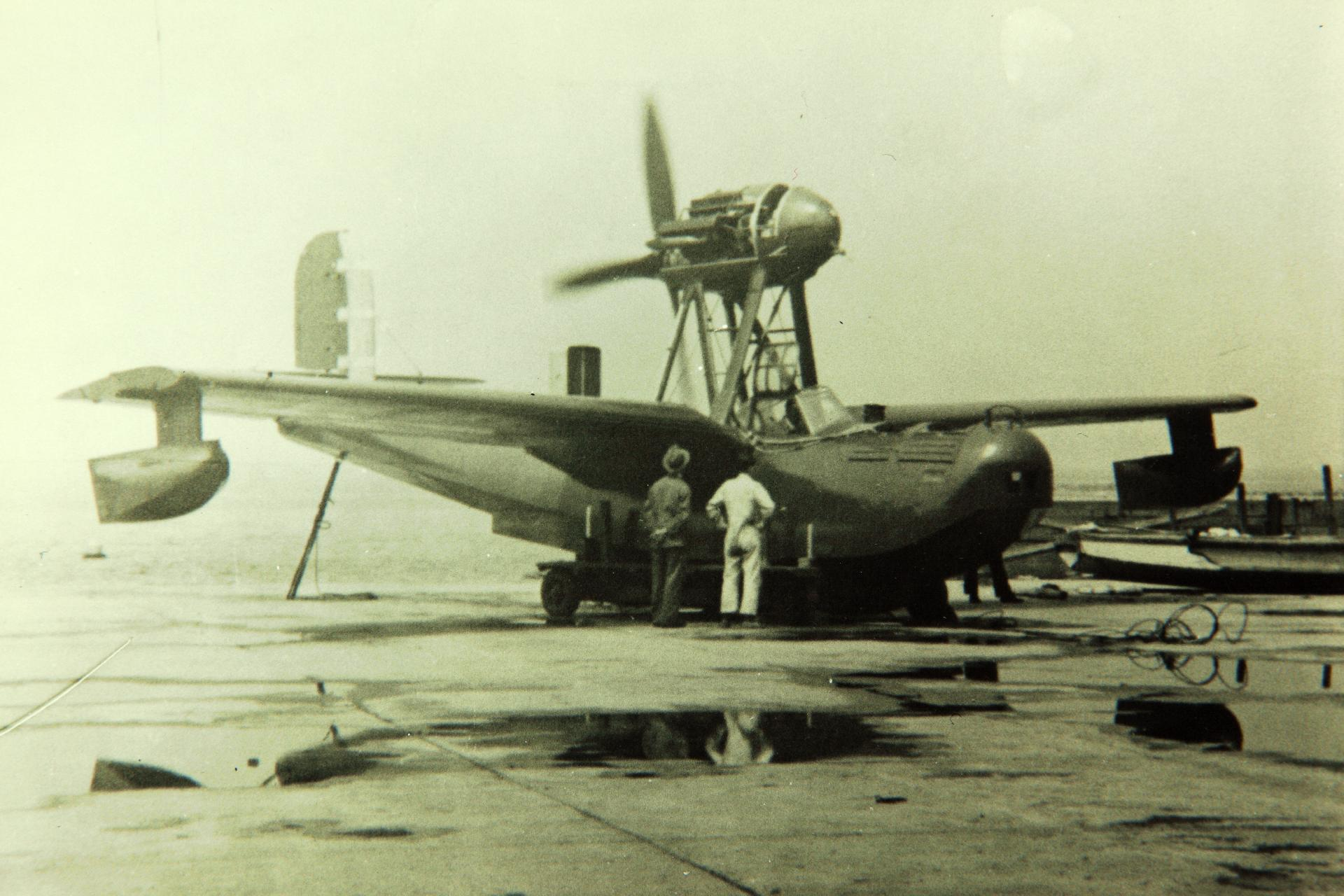

General information
- Type: Night reconnaissance/transport flying boat
- National origin: Japan
- Manufacturer: Kawanishi Aircraft Company
- Primary user: Imperial Japanese Navy
- Number built: 2

History
- First flight: 11 June 1937

The Kawanishi E11K was a Japanese flying boat of the 1930s. It was designed as a night reconnaissance aircraft for the Imperial Japanese Navy (IJN) but was not accepted. The two aircraft that were built were used as transports as the Type 96 Transport Flying Boat during the Second World War.

== Development and design ==
In 1936, the IJN drew up a requirement for an aircraft to replace the Aichi Type 96 Reconnaissance Seaplane as a specialised night reconnaissance aircraft which was intended to spot naval gunfire in night actions and to shadow enemy forces at night, allowing submarines to be directed to targets. The requirement was passed to Aichi and Kawanishi, with both companies producing aircraft to meet the Navy's needs. While Aichi produced a biplane similar to the aircraft that was to be replaced, Kawanishi designed a gull winged cantilever monoplane. It was powered by a single Hiro Type 91 W engine in a pusher configuration, mounted on struts above the wing and driving a four-bladed propeller. The radiator was mounted in a fairing above the rear fuselage so that it was located in the propeller's slipstream. It was fitted with retractable wingtip floats, while its wings folded to aid storage aboard the cruisers of the Japanese Navy.

The first of two prototypes of Kawanishi's design, the Experimental 11-Shi Special Reconnaissance Seaplane,^{[a]} with the short designation E11K, made its maiden flight on 11 June 1937. It proved to have poor stability and water handling, while the engine installation overheated. It was unsuitable for the night reconnaissance role, with the Aichi design proving generally superior and being ordered into production as the Aichi E11A.

== Operational history ==
The two prototypes were fitted with retractable beaching gear, in order to serve as a utility transport aircraft, and was accepted into service by the Japanese Navy as the Type 96 Transport.^{[b]} These aircraft were used as liaison aircraft for reconnaissance seaplane squadrons and remained in use well into the Second World War.

== Specifications ==
Data from Japanese Aircraft 1910–1941

General characteristics

- Crew: 3
- Length: 11.90 m (39 ft 1 in)
- Wingspan: 16.19 m (53 ft 1 in)
- Height: 4.504 m (14 ft 9 in) (Transport aircraft 4.40 m (14 ft 5.25 in))
- Wing area: 38 m^{2} (410 sq ft)
- Empty weight: 2,170 kg (4,784 lb) (Transport aircraft 2,720 kg (5,996 lb))
- Gross weight: 3,300 kg (7,275 lb) (Transport aircraft 3,860 kg (8,509 lb))
- Powerplant: 1 × Hiro Type 91-1 water-cooled twelve-cylinder W engine, 450 kW (620 hp)
- Propellers: 4-bladed

Performance

- Maximum speed: 232 km/h (144 mph, 125 kn)
- Cruise speed: 130 km/h (81 mph, 70 kn)
- Range: 1,520 km (940 mi, 820 nmi)
- Endurance: 8.4 hr
- Service ceiling: 3,795 m (12,450 ft)

== See also ==
Aircraft of comparable role, configuration, and era

- Aichi AB-4
- Aichi E10A
- Aichi E11A
- Beriev MBR-2
- Kawanishi E10K
- Loire 130

Related lists

- List of military aircraft of Japan
- List of flying boats and floatplanes

== Footnotes ==
- ^{a} In the Japanese Navy designation system, specifications were given a Shi number based on the year of the Emperor's reign it was issued. In this case 11-Shi stood for 1936, the 11th year of the Shōwa era.
- ^{b} Kawanishi had made a similar modification to its earlier Kawanishi E10K, which had lost out to the Aichi E10A, producing the Navy Type 94 Transport.
