= Kawanishi E10K =

Japanese flying boat

E10K/Navy Type 94 Transport

General information
- Type: Night reconnaissance/Transport flying boat
- National origin: Japan
- Manufacturer: Kawanishi Aircraft Company
- Primary user: Imperial Japanese Navy
- Number built: 1

History
- First flight: 10 September 1934

The Kawanishi E10K, also known as Kawanishi Type T, Kawanishi Navy Type 94 Transport Seaplane and Kawanishi Navy Experimental 9-Shi Night Reconnaissance Seaplane, was a small Japanese flying boat of the 1930s. It was a single-engined biplane intended to meet a requirement for a night reconnaissance aircraft for the Imperial Japanese Navy but was not selected for production, the single prototype being converted to a transport and operated as the Navy Type 94 Transport.

== Design and development ==
In 1934, the Imperial Japanese Navy issued a specification for a night reconnaissance aircraft, intended to shadow enemy ships at night, allowing submarines to be directed to their targets and, in a surface action, to spot for the guns of the fleet. This concept had been tested with the Aichi Experimental 6-Shi Night Reconnaissance Flying boat, which had proved unsuitable for service use. The aircraft was required to have good endurance and slow speed stability to help its crews in flying long missions at night, while it also needed to be suitable for catapulting from warships.

Contracts were awarded to both Aichi and Kawanishi to design and build prototypes to meet the requirement. Kawanishi's design, with the company designation Kawanishi Type T was a single-engined tractor configuration biplane of all-metal construction. Its single-bay wings, which folded backwards for storage on ship, were based on those of the Kawanishi E7K reconnaissance floatplane, while the Nakajima Kotobuki radial engine was mounted forward of the top wing. The stressed-skin hull held a crew of three, with pilot and co-pilot sitting in an enclosed cockpit, while the gunner/observer sat in the nose, armed with a single flexibly mounted machine gun.

== Operational history ==
The Type T made its maiden flight on 10 September 1934. Testing proved unsuccessful, with water handling problems and poor stability in the air, and the Navy considered it unsuitable for the night reconnaissance role, instead ordering the competing Aichi design into production as the E10A.

Kawanishi converted the Type T to a utility transport, fitting it with a retractable beaching gear, and, as such, it entered service with the Navy as the Navy Type 94 Transport but no production followed.

== Specifications (Type 94 Transport) ==
Data from Japanese Aircraft 1910–1941

General characteristics

- Crew: 3
- Length: 15.00 m (49 ft 3 in)
- Wingspan: 11.00 m (36 ft 1 in)
- Height: 4.40 m (14 ft 5 in)
- Wing area: 52.0 m^{2} (560 sq ft)
- Empty weight: 2,300 kg (5,071 lb)
- Gross weight: 3,380 kg (7,452 lb)
- Powerplant: 1 × Nakajima Kotobuki 4-kai 9-cylinder air-cooled radial engine, 530 kW (710 hp)
- Propellers: 3-bladed fixed-pitch metal propeller

Performance

- Maximum speed: 189 km/h (117 mph, 102 kn)
- Cruise speed: 110 km/h (69 mph, 60 kn)
- Range: 1,190 km (740 mi, 640 nmi)
- Service ceiling: 3,460 m (11,350 ft)

== See also ==
Aircraft of comparable role, configuration, and era

- Aichi E10A
- Aichi E11A
- Kawanishi E11K

== Notes ==
- ^{a} In the Japanese Navy designation system, specifications were given a Shi number based on the year of the Emperor's reign it was issued. In this case 9-Shi stood for 1934, the 9th year of the Shōwa era.
