= Kawanishi K-3 =

Japanese civil transport aircraft

General information
- Type: Civil passenger and general purpose transport aircraft
- National origin: Japan
- Manufacturer: Kawanishi Aircraft
- Designer: Eiji Sekiguchi
- Number built: 1

History
- First flight: 1921
- Developed from: Kawanishi K-1

The Kawanishi K-3 was a Japanese, fast, multi-purpose civil transport aircraft from the early 1920s. Despite its good performance it was eclipsed by the release of Army surplus machines and only one was built.

== Design and development ==
The K-3, completed in October 1921, was designed as a fast civil transport able to carry two passengers or mail and other cargo. It was a development of the Kawanishi K-1 completed in December 1920 and was more powerful, aerodynamically cleaner and faster. Like most aircraft of its period it had a wooden structure and was fabric-covered.

It was a single bay biplane with rectangular plan wings braced by parallel pairs of interplane struts. The upper wing was joined to the upper fuselage by a cabane formed by pairs of transverse outward-leaning inverted V-struts to the forward wing spar and similar but longitudinal V's to the rear. The lower wing was joined as usual to the lower fuselage longerons.

At the end of World War I Japan received a large number of Maybach engines, designed to power airships, as part of its war reparations. The K-3 was the first Japanese aircraft to use one, a Maybach Mb.IVa six cylinder, water-cooled, upright straight engine producing 260–305 hp (194–227 kW). Its radiator was mounted horizontally in the upper wing centre section to reduce drag. It was nose-mounted and smoothly faired into the fuselage behind. An open, underwing cockpit seated two passengers side-by-side, with the pilot in a second open cockpit well behind the wing trailing edges.

The K-3 had a fixed, conventional undercarriage with mainwheels on a single axle with pairs of faired landing legs and rearward drag struts mounted on the lower fuselage longerons. There was a short tailskid.

== Operational history ==
The K-3 first flew in the early winter of 1921. It was the fastest civil aircraft in Japan, with the speed of a fighter and the load-carrying ability of a light bomber. Kawanishi had hopes of commercial success but instead the light civil transport market was filled by the lower-powered and slower Nakajima Type 5 Trainers released by the Army and no more K-3s were built.

In 1926 the sole K-3 was modified to take a straight six, 200–230 hp (150–170 kW) Benz Bz.IIIaV engine as well as other changes to become the Kawanishi K-3B.

== Variants ==
Kawanishi K-3
Prototype with 260–305 hp (194–227 kW) Maybach Mb.IVa.
Kawanishi K-3B
Prototype with 200–230 hp (150–170 kW) Benz Bz.IIIaV and airframe modifications.

== Specifications (K-3) ==
Data from Japanese Aircraft 1910-1941

General characteristics

- Crew: one
- Capacity: two passengers
- Length: 8.86 m (29 ft 1 in)
- Wingspan: 10.03 m (32 ft 11 in)
- Height: 2.60 m (8 ft 6 in)
- Wing area: 30.5 m^{2} (328 sq ft)
- Airfoil: RAF 15
- Empty weight: 970 kg (2,138 lb)
- Gross weight: 1,400 kg (3,086 lb)
- Powerplant: 1 × Maybach Mb.IVa six cylinder water-cooled inline, 194–227 kW (260–305 hp)
- Propellers: wooden

Performance

- Maximum speed: 230 km/h (140 mph, 120 kn)
- Landing Speed: 97 km/h (60 mph; 52 kn)
- Endurance: 5 hr
- Service ceiling: 8,500 m (27,900 ft)
- Time to altitude: 10 min to 3,000 m (9,800 ft)
