= Kawanishi K-6 =

Japanese civil utility floatplane

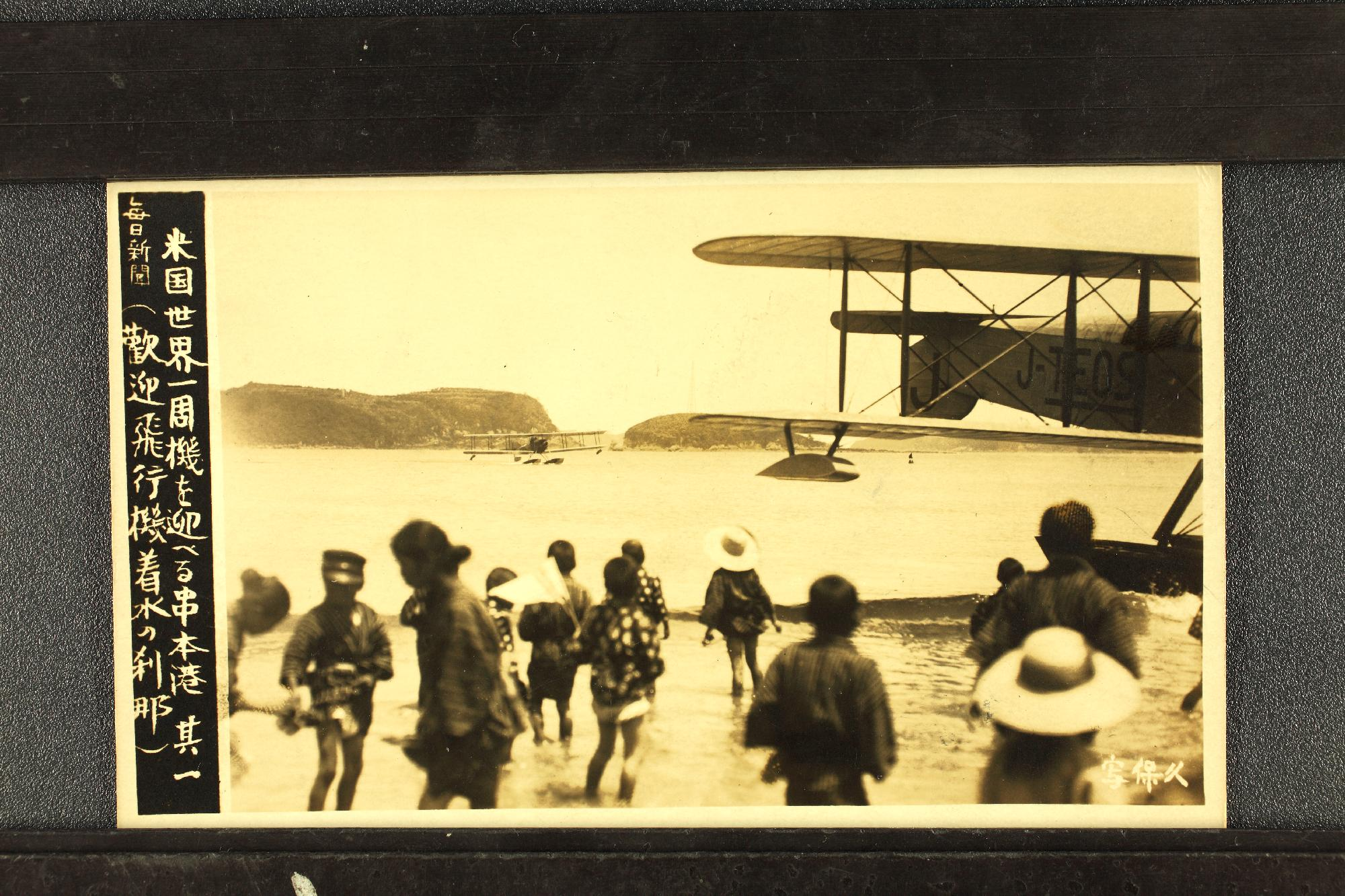

General information
- Type: Three seat civil floatplane transport
- National origin: Japan
- Manufacturer: Kawanishi
- Designer: Eiji Sekiguchi
- Primary user: Japan Aviation
- Number built: 1

History
- First flight: 1923

The Kawanishi K-6 was a passenger-carrying biplane floatplane, built in Japan in the 1920s. The sole example took part in an around Japan flight then flew as a transport with Japan Aviation.

== Design and development ==
Kawanishi's first floatplane design was the K-5, which though foreseen as Japan's first successful large seaplane transport turned out to lack the power to take-off carrying any significant load. As no more powerful engine than the 260–305 hp (194–227 kW) Maybach Mb.IV was available, the K-5's development was abandoned late in 1922. Instead, Eiji Sekiguchi designed a new, smaller, lighter aircraft with the same engine. This, the K-6, was informed by the latest control and stability research from Göttingen. It was completed in November 1923 and was intended to be used by Kawanishi's Nippon Koku KK (Japan Aviation Co. Ltd)

The K-6 was a two bay biplane with fabric covering over a wooden structure. Its equal span wings were rectangular in plan out to rounded tips and braced together without stagger by parallel pairs of interplane struts. The pilot's open cockpit was between the wings, close behind the upright, water-cooled Maybach. The K-6's two passengers were in a separate cockpit behind him, originally open but later enclosed under multi-panel glazing faired smoothly into the upper rear fuselage. The latter was flat sided and remained deep to the tail; its surface served to stabilize the aircraft in yaw and there was no conventional fixed fin. The K-6 had a straight-edged, round-topped rudder, hinged on the extreme fuselage and cut-away for elevator movement, which was unusual in projecting only below the fuselage. Its tailplane was mounted on top of the fuselage and braced to the lower fuselage longerons with pairs of parallel struts.

The sides of its flat-surfaced floats met at bow and stern. Each float had a shallow step under the trailing edge. They were held under the fuselage on fore and aft struts to the lower longerons.

== Operational history ==
Soon after completion it was decided that instead of immediate commercial use the K-6 should be part of the Around Japan Flight, an event sponsored by Nippon Koku KK and the Daimai Tonichi Shimbun newspaper. Some modifications followed: the passenger seats were replaced with extra fuel tanks, the engine radiator was moved, shallow fins were added on the tailplane undersides together with outrigger floats under the wing. Normally well above the water, these limited roll when afloat. The July 1924 flight began and ended at Osaka and covered 4,389 km (2,727 mi; 2,370 nmi). The K-6, flown by Yukichi Goto with flight engineer Minezo Yonesawa, covered the route in eight days, though flying for only 33 hr 48 min.

On 2 December 1924 the K-6 won the seaplane category in the competitive Round Ise Bay event, covering three circuits totalling 850 km (530 mi; 460 nmi) in 6 hr 30 min. After that the K-6, with passenger seats reinstalled, was returned to transport duties. No more were built as Kawanishi's attention turned to its successor, the K-7.

== Specifications ==
Data from Japanese Aircraft 1910-1941.

General characteristics

- Crew: one
- Capacity: two passengers
- Length: 9.90 m (32 ft 6 in)
- Wingspan: 13.60 m (44 ft 7 in)
- Height: 3.95 m (13 ft 0 in)
- Wing area: 43.6 m^{2} (469 sq ft)
- Airfoil: RAF 15
- Empty weight: 1,150 kg (2,535 lb)
- Gross weight: 1,890 kg (4,167 lb)
- Powerplant: 1 × Maybach Mb.IVa six cylinder, water-cooled inline, 194–227 kW (260–305 hp)
- Propellers: 2-bladed wooden

Performance

- Maximum speed: 167 km/h (104 mph, 90 kn)
- Alighting speed: 95 km/h (59 mph; 51 kn)
- Endurance: 4 hr
- Service ceiling: 7,000 m (23,000 ft)
- Time to altitude: 17 min to 3,000 m (9,800 ft)
