= Aichi AB-6 =

AB-6

General information
- Type: Reconnaissance floatplane
- National origin: Japan
- Manufacturer: Aichi
- Designer: Tetsuo Miki
- Number built: 1

History
- First flight: 1933
- Developed from: Heinkel He 62

The Aichi AB-6, or Aichi Experimental 7-Shi Reconnaissance Seaplane, was a prototype Japanese reconnaissance floatplane. It was a single-engined, three-seat biplane intended for the Imperial Japanese Navy, but only one was built, the rival aircraft from Kawanishi, the E7K being preferred.

== Design and development ==
In 1932, the Imperial Japanese Navy raised a specification for a long-range floatplane reconnaissance aircraft to replace its Yokosuka E1Y and E5Y operating from its seaplane tenders and battleships, requesting prototypes from Aichi and Kawanishi. Aichi's entry, the Aichi AB-6 or Aichi Experimental 7-Shi Reconnaissance Seaplane,^{[a]} designed by Tetsuo Miki, was based on the Heinkel He 62, one example of which had been imported by Aichi the previous year for evaluation against a similar requirement. The AB-6 was a biplane with folding wings for storage aboard ship, of all-metal construction with fabric covering, and powered by a single Hiro Type 91 W12 engine. Its crew of three, pilot, observer and radio operator/gunner were accommodated in an enclosed cockpit.

== Operational history ==
The prototype was completed in February 1933 and made its maiden flight from Nagoya harbor. While it had good handling in the air, its speed, take-off, and landing performance was disappointing, and the aircraft was modified to try to improve matters. It was fitted with revised wings, of different aerofoil section and with full-span leading edge slats. The original Hamilton-Standard two-bladed metal variable-pitch propeller was first replaced by a two-bladed wooden propeller and then a four-bladed wooden unit. Despite these changes, Kawanishi's design remained superior, and in 1934, was ordered into production as the Navy Type 94 Reconnaissance Seaplane, or Kawanishi E7K.

== Specifications (final configuration) ==
Data from Japanese Aircraft 1910–1941

General characteristics

- Crew: 3
- Length: 10.44 m (34 ft 3 in)
- Wingspan: 12.98 m (42 ft 7 in)
- Height: 4.80 m (15 ft 9 in)
- Wing area: 40.61 m^{2} (437.1 sq ft)
- Empty weight: 1,920 kg (4,233 lb)
- Gross weight: 3,020 kg (6,658 lb)
- Max takeoff weight: 3,300 kg (7,275 lb)
- Powerplant: 1 × Hiro Type 91 water-cooled W12 engine, 470 kW (630 hp)

Performance

- Maximum speed: 230 km/h (140 mph, 120 kn) at sea level
- Cruise speed: 150 km/h (92 mph, 80 kn) at 1,000 m (3,300 ft)
- Stall speed: 81 km/h (50 mph, 44 kn)
- Endurance: 11.9 h
- Service ceiling: 4,850 m (15,910 ft)
- Time to altitude: 3,000 m (9,840 ft) in 14 min 54 s

Armament

- Guns: 1× fixed, forward firing 7.7 mm machine gun, 1 flexibly mounted in rear cockpit and 1× under fuselage

== See also ==
Aircraft of comparable role, configuration, and era

- Kawanishi E7K

== Notes ==
- ^{a} In the Japanese Navy designation system, specifications were given a Shi number based on the year of the Emperor's reign it was issued. In this case 7-Shi stood for 1932, the 7th year of the Shōwa era.
