= Kawanishi K-8 Transport Seaplane =

Japanese mail floatplane

K-8 Transport Seaplane
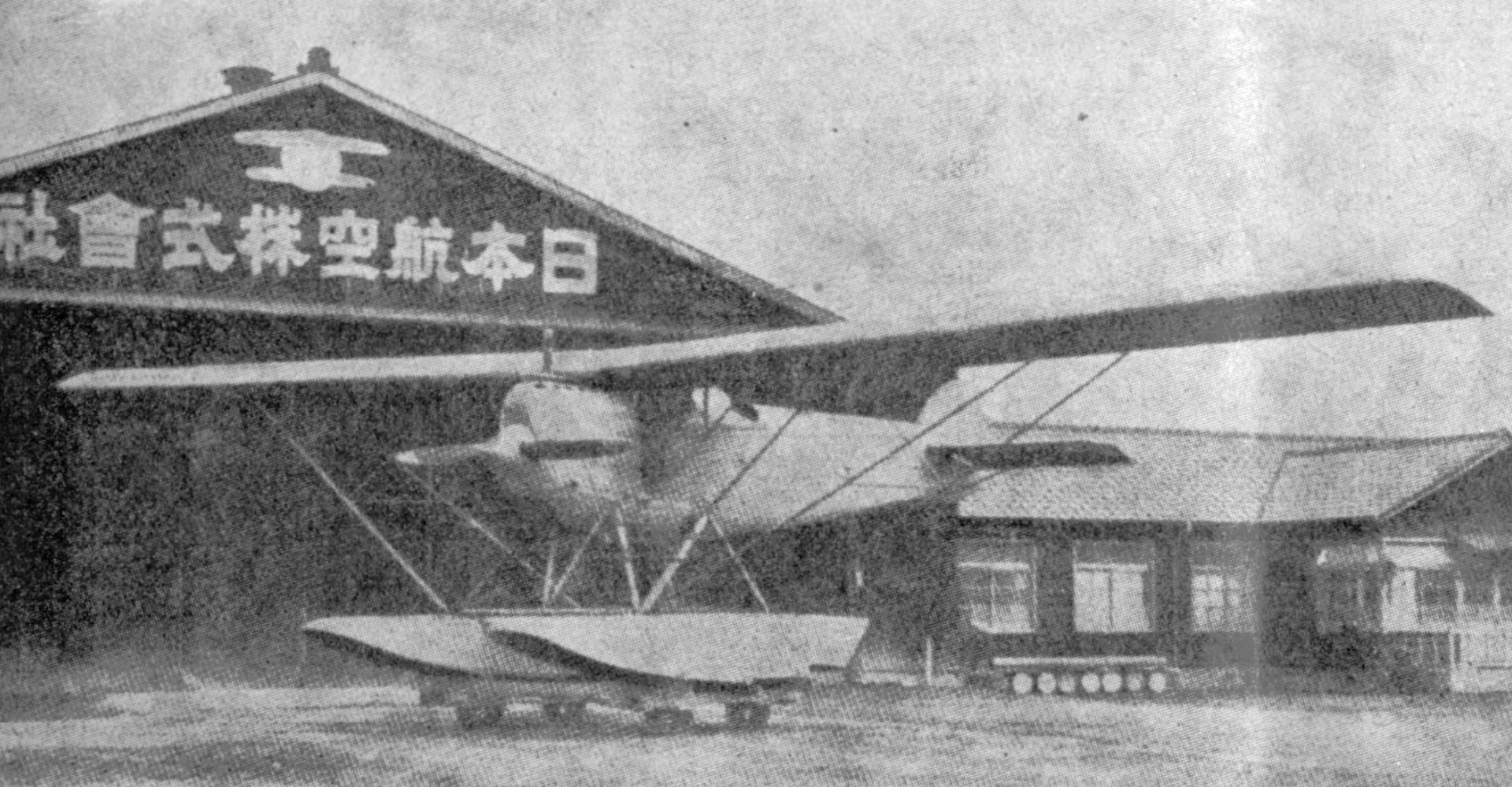
- A K-8A floatplane (ignore the image title, caption and info)

General information
- Type: Mailplane
- National origin: Japan
- Manufacturer: Kawanishi Aircraft Company
- Designer: Eiji Sekiguchi
- Primary user: Nippon Koku KK
- Number built: 7

History
- First flight: 1926

The Kawanishi K-8 Transport Seaplane was a Japanese single-engined floatplane of the 1920s. Seven were built in 1926 and 1927, and were used to operate airmail services.

== Design and development ==
In early 1925, Eiji Sekiguchi, chief designer of the aircraft department of Kawanishi Kikai Setsakuho (Kawanishi Machinery Manufacturing Works), started work on a long-range floatplane for use by Nippon Koku K.K. the airline subsidiary of Kawanishi on airmail services. The resulting design, the Kawanishi K-8A, was a single-engined monoplane with a fabric covered wooden structure. It was powered by a 305 hp (227 kW) Maybach Mb.IVa water-cooled inline-engine, as used in Kawanishi's successful K-7 biplane, but was larger and heavier than the K-7. The aircraft was fitted with a twin-float undercarriage, while the crew of two sat in open cockpits. The first prototype was completed in January 1926 with a shoulder-wing layout, but following aircraft had the wing raised to a parasol wing arrangement. The aircraft demonstrated relatively poor performance, but showed good stability, making it popular for long-distance flights. A total of 5 K-8As were completed in 1926, all going to Nippon Koku K.K..

The design attracted the attention of the Teiko Kaibo Gitai, (the Imperial Maritime Defence Volunteer Association), a patriotic organization, who placed an order for two modified aircraft, the Kawanishi K-8B, with reduced span wings, a slimmer fuselage and the crew cockpits moved rearwards. These two aircraft were completed in 1927, demonstrating improved performance.

== Operational history ==
The five K-8As were all used by Nippon Koku for its airmail service between Osaka and Fukuoka. The two K-8Bs were used to carry out two formation tours around Japan in April and May 1927 in an effort to promote aviation. They were then leased free-of-charge to Nippon Koku on the condition that they would be transferred to the Imperial Japanese Navy on request. They joined the K-8As on the Osaka–Fukuoa airmail route, and were heavily used before they were retired in April 1929.

== Variants ==
Kawanishi K-8A Transport Seaplane
Single-engined mailplane for Nippon Koku. Five built.
Kawanishi K-8B Transport Seaplane
Modified version of K-8A, with reduced wingspan 16.0 m (52 ft 6 in) and improved performance (185 km/h (115 mph; 100 kn) speed and 9 hour endurance). Two built for Teiko Kaibo Gitai, and later used by Nippon Koku.

== Operators ==
Japan
Nippon Koku K.K.

== Specifications (K-8A) ==
Data from Japanese Aircraft 1910–1940

General characteristics

- Crew: 2
- Length: 10.935 m (35 ft 11 in)
- Wingspan: 17.6 m (57 ft 9 in)
- Height: 3.68 m (12 ft 1 in)
- Wing area: 39.0 m^{2} (420 sq ft)
- Airfoil: Göttingen 420
- Empty weight: 1,320 kg (2,910 lb)
- Gross weight: 1,930 kg (4,255 lb)
- Powerplant: 1 × Maybach Mb.IVa 6-cylinder water-cooled inline piston engine, 227 kW (305 hp)
- Propellers: 2-bladed fixed-pitch propeller

Performance

- Maximum speed: 165 km/h (103 mph, 89 kn) at sea level
- Alighting speed: 91 km/h (57 mph; 49 kn)
- Endurance: 7 hours
- Service ceiling: 6,500 m (21,300 ft)
- Wing loading: 49.5 kg/m^{2} (10.1 lb/sq ft)
- Power/mass: 9.9 kg/kW (16.3 lb/hp)
