= Kawanishi K-10 Transport =

Japanese civil transport aircraft

K-10 Transport

General information
- Type: Civil transport
- National origin: Japan
- Manufacturer: Kawanishi Aircraft
- Designer: Eiji Sekiguchi
- Primary user: Nippon Koku KK
- Number built: 2

History
- First flight: late summer 1926

The Kawanishi K-10 Transport was a 1920s Japanese passenger and mail transport. Two were built, one briefly serving a route between cities in Japan, Korea and China.

== Design and development ==
The K-10 was designed by Eiji Sekiguchi to carry passengers and mail on the challenging, over-water Osaka- Seoul - Dalian (Derien) route. In the 1920s these cities were Japanese possessions.

It was a single bay biplane with a fabric-covered wooden structure. The wings were rectangular in plan out to rounded tips and braced together with a pair of parallel interplane struts on each side. The wing centre-section and fuselage were joined by two N--form cabane struts.

Originally the K-10 was powered by a 400 hp (300 kW) V12 Lorraine 12D engine driving a four-bladed propeller. Its two passengers sat side-by-side in an open cockpit ahead of the pilot. This engine was soon replaced by a 260–305 hp (194–227 kW), six cylinder Maybach Mb.IVa, its rectangular radiator beneath it and with a two-bladed propeller. Room was found for four passenger seats in an enclosed cabin between the wings. The fuselage was flat-sided, with rounded decking, and the tail was conventional, with a blunted rectangular fin and narrow, rectangular rudder.

It had fixed, conventional landing gear with wheels on a single axle. Both faired drag struts and slender legs, fitted with conspicuous, square shock absorbers, were mounted on the lower fuselage.

== Operational history ==
The first of two K-10s was completed in August 1926 and made its first flight soon after. In September it joined the sole Kawanishi K-7B carrying mail on the Osaka - Seoul - Dalian (Derien) route, completing six of these tours before retirement.

Soon after, on 2 October 1926, it appeared at the Kansai Aviation Day display, carrying passengers to enhance Japanese aviation awareness.

== Operators ==
- Nippon Koku KK

== Specifications (Maybach engine) ==
Data from Japanese Aircraft 1910-1941

General characteristics

- Crew: one
- Capacity: four passengers
- Length: 8.90 m (29 ft 2 in)
- Wingspan: 13 m (42 ft 8 in)
- Height: 3.55 m (11 ft 8 in)
- Wing area: 44.85 m^{2} (482.8 sq ft)
- Empty weight: 1,057 kg (2,330 lb)
- Gross weight: 1,762 kg (3,885 lb)
- Powerplant: 1 × Maybach Mb.IVa six cylinder water-cooled, upright inline, 194–227 kW (260–305 hp)
- Propellers: 2-bladed wooden

Performance

- Maximum speed: 172 km/h (107 mph, 93 kn) at sea level
- Landing speed: 79 km/h (49 mph; 43 kn)
- Endurance: 7 hr
- Service ceiling: 6,000 m (20,000 ft)
