= Kawanishi K-2 =

Japanese racing aircraft

General information
- Type: Single seat racing aircraft
- National origin: Japan
- Manufacturer: Kawanishi Aircraft
- Designer: Eiji Sekiguchi
- Number built: 1

History
- First flight: Summer 1921

The sole Kawanishi K-2 was the first specialized Japanese racing aircraft. The advanced, single-seat low-wing monoplane's first flight was in the late summer of 1921. It had a promisingly high maximum speed but a career limited by numerous minor accidents produced no victories or records.

== Design and development ==
In the early 1920s, the Japanese Imperial Flying Association sponsored flying exhibitions which included competitive racing. Yukichi Goto had piloted the Kawanishi K-1 mailplane at such events and suggested that the company should build a specialized racing aircraft. The K-2 was the result and was advanced for its biplane-dominated times. Like them, the K-2 had a wooden structure and was fabric covered but was a low wing monoplane. As originally designed, the K-2 had an internally braced cantilever wing but Goto suggested the addition of bracing wires. Later these wires were replaced by short, parallel pairs of struts from the upper fuselage longerons to the wing spars. The form of bracing used for the first flight, made in the summer of 1921, is not known but most photographs show it with struts.

The K-2 was powered by a 200–244 hp (149–182 kW) Hall-Scott L-6 water-cooled, upright straight six engine. The cowling was carefully faired into the fuselage behind it, streamlining in keeping with the rest of the K-2 apart from its radiator and landing gear. The radiator was mounted just above the fuselage near the rear of the engine in a rather rectangular profile enclosure. The pilot's open cockpit was well behind the wing trailing edge. Behind it the lower fuselage was flat-sided and tapering in plan, with a rounded decking topped by a fairing which began as a headrest and deepened rearwards. Near the tail the upper and lower fuselage sides merged to make flat surfaces which stabilized the aircraft in yaw; there was no separate fin. Instead, the narrow balanced rudder was hinged on the extreme fuselage. The K-2's rectangular plan horizontal tail was mounted on top of the main fuselage structure, well forward of the rudder.

Its conventional, fixed landing gear was not faired. The main wheels were on split axles, hinged centrally on the vertex of a transverse V-strut mounted on the lower fuselage longerons. The landing legs and trailing drag struts were also mounted on the lower fuselage.

== Operational history ==
In early tests the K-2 reached a speed of 235 km/h (146 mph), suggesting a competitive racing future but a series of accidents, some involving propeller damage, prevented an attack on the national speed record. On 11 July 1921 it was unofficially timed at 257 km/h (160 mph; 139 kn).

== Specifications ==
Data from Japanese Aircraft 1910-1941

General characteristics

- Crew: one
- Length: 6.57 m (21 ft 7 in)
- Wingspan: 9.67 m (31 ft 9 in)
- Height: 2.35 m (7 ft 9 in)
- Wing area: 13.2 m^{2} (142 sq ft)
- Airfoil: Durand 52
- Empty weight: 680 kg (1,499 lb)
- Gross weight: 860 kg (1,896 lb)
- Powerplant: 1 × Hall-Scott L-6 water-cooled, upright straight six, 149–182 kW (200–244 hp)
- Propellers: 2-bladed wooden

Performance

- Maximum speed: 260 km/h (160 mph, 140 kn)
- Landing Speed: 105 km/h (65 mph; 57 kn)
- Service ceiling: 7,600 m (24,900 ft)
