= H4H =

H4H may refer to:

- Habitat for Humanity, an international housing charity
- Help for Heroes, a British veteran's organization
- Hiro H4H, a Japanese interwar bomber
- Human for Human, Polish agencja rekrutacji
