= LFG Roland G.I =

1910s German bomber aircraft prototype

G.I
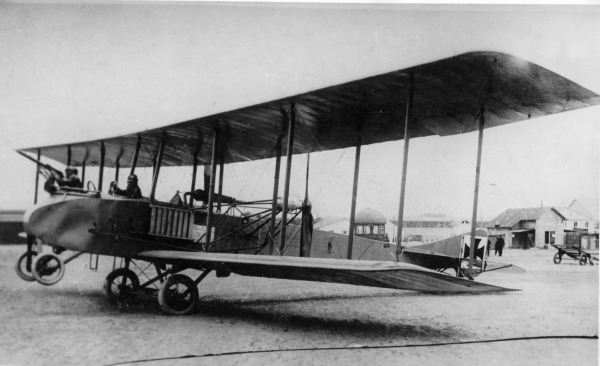

General information
- Type: Two-seat bomber
- National origin: Germany
- Manufacturer: LFG Roland (Luft-Fahrzeug-Gesellschaft)
- Number built: 1

History
- First flight: 1915

The LFG Roland G.I was a large prototype single-engine biplane bomber built in Germany in 1915, during World War I. It had a single engine buried in the fuselage driving pusher configuration propellers mounted on outriggers.

== Design and development ==
The G.I was a biplane with a span of over 30 m (98 ft). Although it had twin pusher propellers mounted between the wings and an Idflieg G designation (heavy bomber), it had only a single engine, mounted in the fuselage over the centre of gravity and linked to the propellers by gears and shafts. Hazet radiators mounted on the sides of the fuselage between the wings provided cooling to the adjacent engine.

The G.I had unstaggered unequal span wings, straight edged and of constant chord and with three bays per side defined by parallel interplane struts. Its fuselage was flat sided with a rounded nose containing the gunner's position. The pilot's cockpit was immediately behind the gunner but ahead of the wing leading edge. The Maybach Mb.IVa water-cooled six cylinder inline engine was directly behind the pilot driving two propellers placed on outriggers in the inner bays. The fuselage was tapered toward the tail, where a broad chord, triangular fin carried a rectangular rudder that extended below the fuselage. The undercarriage was conventional, with wheels on a single axle mounted on a pair of V-struts to the fuselage. There was also a tail skid and a pair of smaller wheels mounted under the nose to avoid nose-overs.

== Specifications ==
Data from Gray and Thetford p.463

General characteristics

- Crew: Two
- Length: 15.9 m (52 ft 2 in)
- Wingspan: 30.1 m (98 ft 9 in)
- Empty weight: 2,750 kg (6,063 lb)
- Gross weight: 4,300 kg (9,480 lb)
- Powerplant: 1 × Maybach Mb.IVa 6 cylinder water-cooled in-line piston engine, 183 kW (245 hp)
- Propellers: 2-bladed

Performance

- Maximum speed: 160 km/h (99 mph, 86 kn)

Armament

- Guns: 1 × 7.9 mm (0.31 in) calibre Parabellum MG14 machine gun operated by nose-gunner

== Bibliography ==
- Herris, Jack (2014). Roland Aircraft of WWI: A Centennial Perspective on Great War Airplanes. Great War Aviation Centennial Series. Vol. 9. Aeronaut Books. ISBN 978-1-935881-20-9.
