= Kawanishi J6K Jinpū =

Japanese fighter design

J6K Jinpū
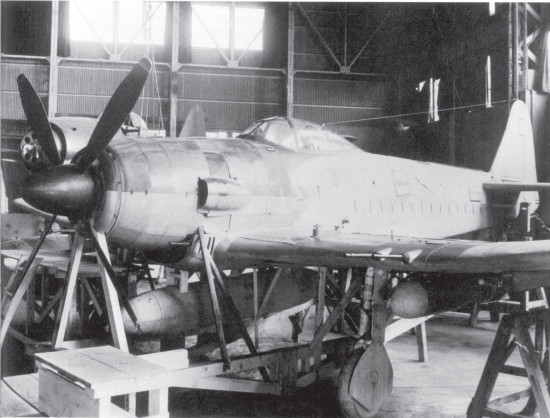
- J6K1 Jinpū in development

General information
- Type: Interceptor aircraft
- National origin: Japan
- Manufacturer: Kawanishi Aircraft Company
- Status: design only
- Primary user: Imperial Japanese Navy Air Service (intended)
- Number built: 0

History
- Developed from: Kawanishi J3K

The Kawanishi J6K Jinpū (陣風, Squall) was an interceptor fighter design developed by the Japanese company Kawanishi Kōkūki KK in the early 1940s. It was based on the earlier Kawanishi J3K.

== Design and development ==
The J6K1 was an improved version of the J3K1 with a more powerful engine. Instead of using the Mitsubishi MK9A, it used the Nakajima NK9A Homare 42 engine. The design reached the mockup phase, but not long before the worsening war situation prompted its cancellation in 1944.

== Specifications (J6K1 as designed) ==
Data from

General characteristics

- Crew: 1
- Powerplant: × Nakajima NK9A Homare 42 18-cylinder two-row air-cooled radial piston engine, 1,600 kW (2,200 hp)
- Propellers: 4-bladed constant-speed propeller

Performance Armament

- Guns:
- 2× 13.2 mm (0.520 in) Type 3 aircraft machine guns
- 2× 30 mm (1.181 in) Type 5 cannon

== See also ==
Aircraft of comparable role, configuration, and era

- Fiat G.55 Centauro
- Hawker Tempest
- Kawanishi N1K2-J
- Kawasaki Ki-100
- Lavochkin La-7
- Messerschmitt Bf 109G
- Mitsubishi J2M3
- North American P-51D Mustang
- Reggiane Re.2005 Sagittario
- Republic P-47N Thunderbolt

Related lists

- List of aircraft of Japan during World War II
- List of aircraft of World War II
- List of fighter aircraft
- List of military aircraft of Japan
