= Heinkel He 62 =

Type of aircraft

He 62, AB-5

General information
- Type: Reconnaissance seaplane
- National origin: Germany
- Manufacturer: Heinkel, Aichi

History
- First flight: 1932

The Heinkel He 62 was a reconnaissance seaplane designed in Germany in the early 1930s. It was a conventional, single-bay biplane with unstaggered wings of equal span. The pilot and gunner sat in tandem, open cockpits. A few aircraft were supplied to Japan, where Aichi built a version as the AB-5, and used it as the basis for the AB-6, but no series production took place. The AB-5 used a locally produced Nakajima Kotobuki in place of the Siemens engine fitted to the German-built aircraft.

== Specifications (He 62) ==
General characteristics

- Crew: Two, pilot and gunner
- Length: 8.48 m (27 ft 10 in)
- Wingspan: 11.70 m (38 ft 5 in)
- Height: 3.67 m (12 ft 1 in)
- Wing area: 36.7 m^{2} (395 sq ft)
- Empty weight: 1,842 kg (4,068 lb)
- Gross weight: 2,920 kg (6,438 lb)
- Powerplant: 1 × Siemens-built Bristol Jupiter , 336 kW (450 hp)

Performance

- Maximum speed: 235 km/h (147 mph, 128 kn)
