= Kawanishi J3K =

Japanese fighter design

J3K

General information
- Type: Fighter
- National origin: Japan
- Manufacturer: Kawanishi Aircraft Company
- Status: Design only
- Primary user: Imperial Japanese Navy Air Service (intended)
- Number built: 0

History
- Retired: 1945

The Kawanishi J3K (long designation: Navy Kawanishi 17-shi Interceptor fighter Otsu (B)) was an interceptor fighter developed by the Japanese company Kawanishi Kōkūki KK in the early 1940s. A further development was the Kawanishi J6K.

== Design and development ==
The J3K was developed in parallel to the Kawanishi N1K-J Shiden but was abandoned in the early stages of development.

== Specifications ==
Data from

General characteristics

- Length: 10.12 m (33 ft 2 in)
- Wingspan: 12.5 m (41 ft 0 in)
- Max takeoff weight: 4,370 kg (9,634 lb)
- Powerplant: 1 × Mitsubishi MK9A 18-cylinder two-row air-cooled radial piston engine, 1,600 kW (2,200 hp)
- Propellers: 4-bladed Constant-speed propeller

Performance

- Maximum speed: 685 km/h (426 mph, 370 kn)
- Service ceiling: 10,800 m (35,400 ft)

Armament

- Guns:
- 2× 13.2 mm (0.520 in) Type 3 aircraft machine guns
- 2× 30 mm (1.181 in) Type 5 cannon

== See also ==
Related lists

- List of aircraft of Japan during World War II
- List of aircraft of World War II
- List of fighter aircraft
- List of military aircraft of Japan
