= Kawanishi Aircraft Company =

Japanese aircraft manufacturer

- Industry: Aircraft production
- Founded: 1920
- Defunct: 1945
- Successor: Shin Meiwa Industries
- Headquarters: Hyōgo Prefecture, Japan

The Kawanishi Aircraft Company (川西航空機, Kawanishi kōkūki) was a Japanese aircraft manufacturer active during World War II.

== History ==
The company was founded as Kawanishi Engineering Works in 1920 in Hyōgo Prefecture as an outgrowth of the Kawanishi conglomerate, which had been funding the Nakajima Aircraft Company. Kawanishi built its first aircraft, the Kawanishi K-1 Mail-carrying Aircraft in 1921, and set up an airline, Nippon Koku K.K. (Japan Aviation Co. Ltd) in 1923, designing and building several aircraft for the airline's use. It was forced by the Japanese government to shut down Nippon Koku in 1929, however, with its routes being transferred to the government-owned Nippon Koku Yuso K.K. (Japan Air Transport Co. Ltd.) Kawanishi then split off the former Kawanishi Engineering Works, forming Kawanishi Kokuki KK in 1928, taking all of the Kawanishi Engineering Works' assets.

While Kawanishi was best known for its seaplanes, such as the Kawanishi H6K and H8K flying boats, its N1K-J land-based fighter -derived from their Kawanishi N1K1 floatplane fighter- was considered one of the best in the war. After Japan's defeat, the company was reborn as Shin Meiwa Industries (later ShinMaywa), and continued to create flying boats such as the PS-1 and US-2.

== Products ==
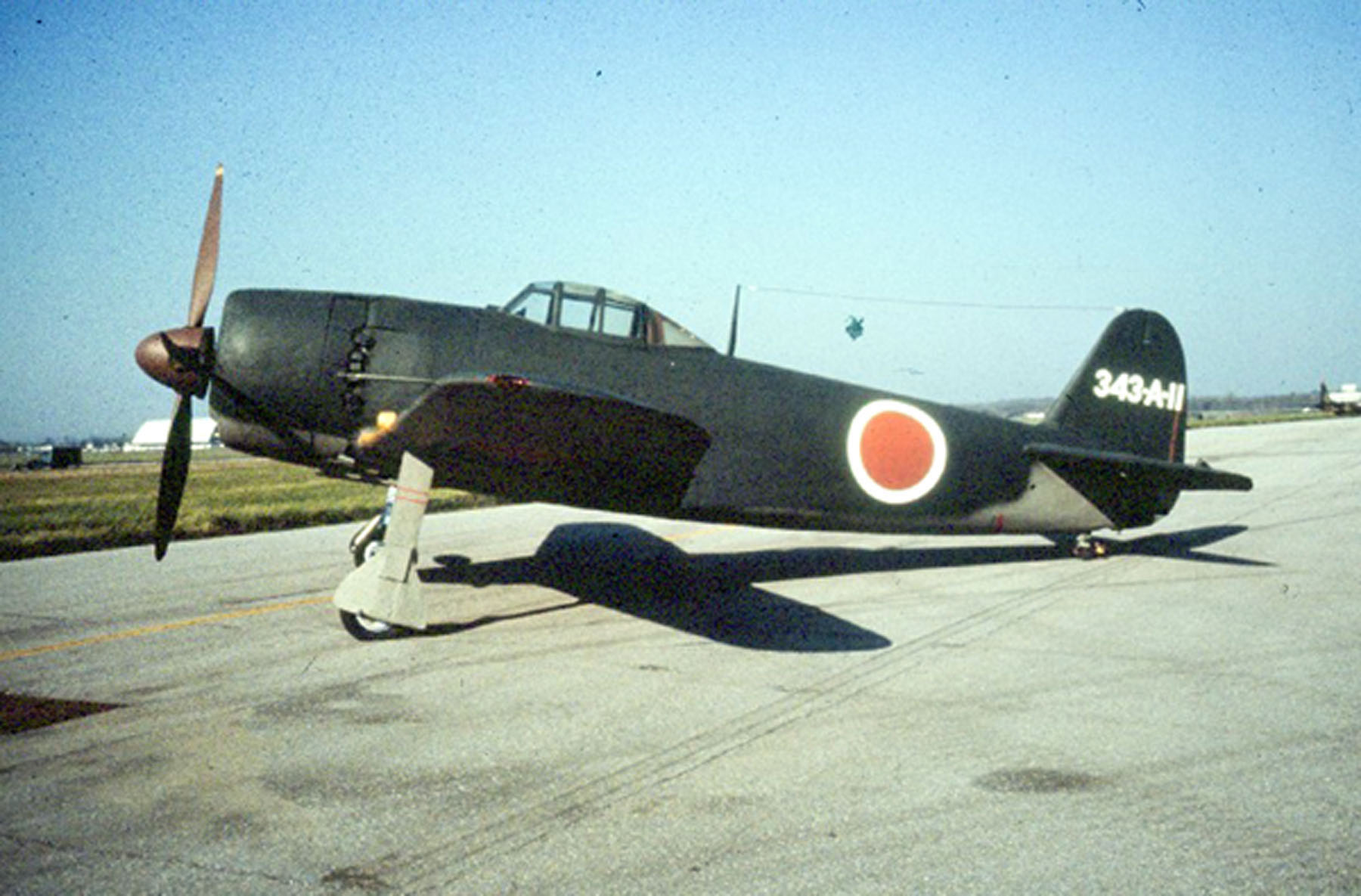
Kawanishi N1K

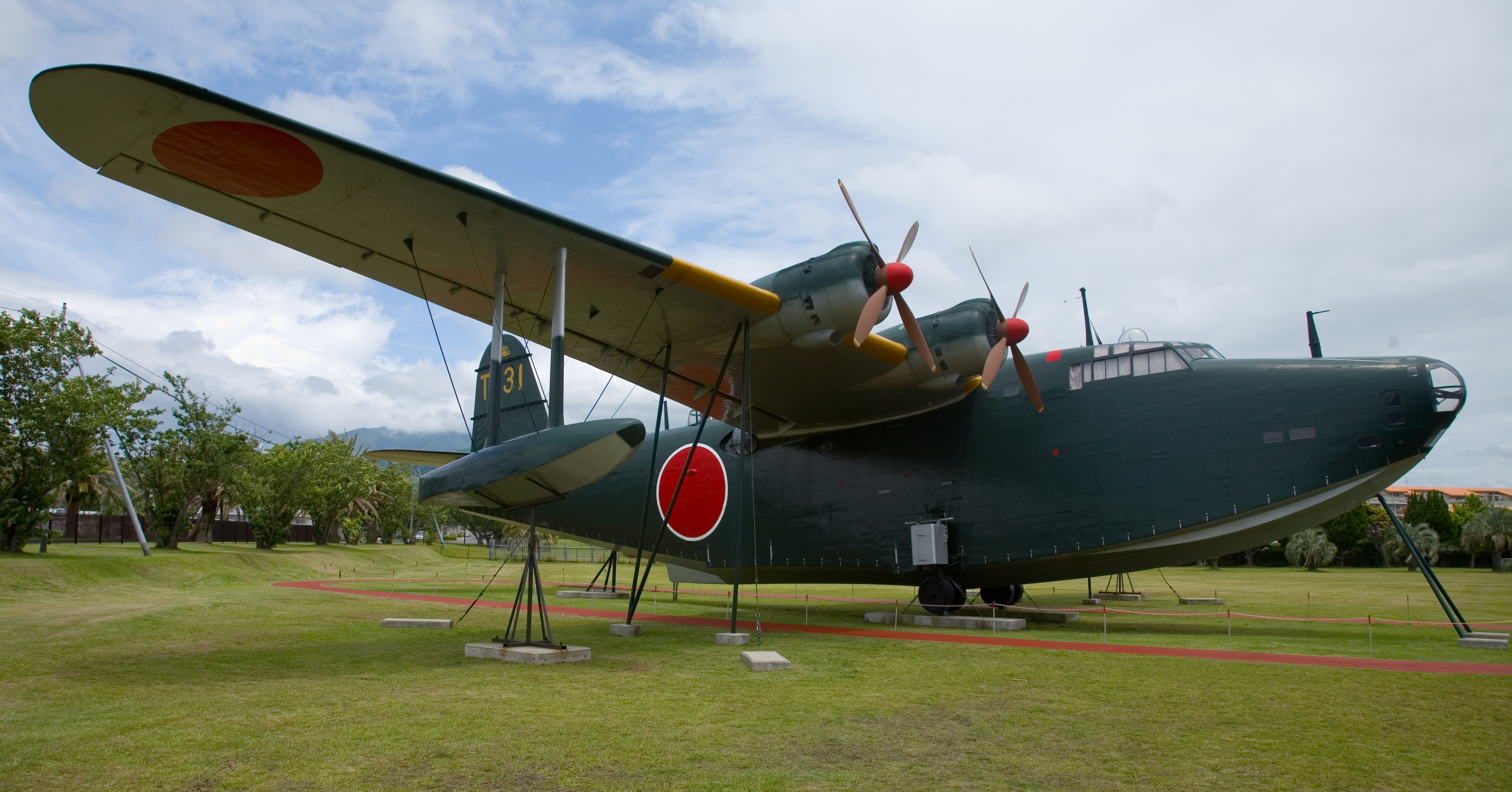
Kawanishi H8K flying boat

=== Floatplanes ===
- E5K - 1931 three-seat reconnaissance floatplane, Kawanishi-built version of Yokosuka E5Y; 20 built
- E7K - 1933 three-seat reconnaissance floatplane; 533 built
- E8K - 1933 reconnaissance floatplane prototype, cancelled as it was inferior to the Nakajima E4N2; one built
- E10K - 1934 night reconnaissance/transport flying boat; one built, but cancelled in favor of the Aichi E10A; prototype converted into a transport
- E11K - 1937 night reconnaissance flying boat; two built, but cancelled in favor of the Aichi E11A
- E12K - 1937 two-seat reconnaissance floatplane project
- E13K - 1938 three-seat reconnaissance floatplane; two built, but cancelled in favor of the Aichi E13A
- E15K Shiun - 1941 reconnaissance floatplane; 15 built

=== Bombers ===
- G9K Gunzan - proposed land-based heavy bomber based on the H8K, remained a project, the "G9K Gunzan" name being a post-war extrapolation.
- K-100 - twin-engine land-based bomber project
- TB - four-engine heavy bomber project

=== Flying boats ===
- H3K - 1930 patrol/training flying boat; 5 built
- H6K - 1936 patrol flying boat developed from the H3K; 215 built
- H8K - 1941 patrol flying boat; 167 built
- H11K Soukū - transport flying boat project; mockup only
- K-60 - long-range 80 ton flying boat project
- K-200 - proposed turbojet-powered long-range flying boat, not built
- KX-3 - 500 ton, 12 engine flying boat project

=== Fighters ===
- K-11 - 1927 carrier-based fighter
- A8K - 1945 projected carrier-based fighter based on the J6K
- J3K - 1942 interceptor fighter, not built
- J6K Jinpū - 1943 interceptor fighter based on the J3K; mockup only
- N1K Kyōfū - 1942 floatplane fighter
- N1K1-J/N1K2-J Shiden/Shiden Kai - 1942 land-based fighter conversion of N1K

=== Trainers ===
- K6K - 1938 floatplane trainer prototype; 2 built
- K8K - 1938 floatplane trainer; 15 built

=== Transports ===
- H6K2-L/H6K4-L - unarmed transport conversions of H6K
- H8K1-L/H8K2-L/H8K4-L Seikū - transport conversions of H8K; H8K4-L remained a project as all H8K4s were lost in 1945
- H11K1-L - projected transport version of H11K

=== Suicide attack aircraft ===
- Baika - projected kamikaze aircraft based on the Fieseler Fi 103R, not built

=== Civil aircraft ===
- K-1 - 1920 mail plane
- K-2 - 1921 single-seat racer
- K-3 - 1921 multipurpose transport aircraft developed from the K-1
- K-5 - 1922 floatplane mail plane
- K-6 - 1923 three-seat biplane airliner
- K-7A Transport Seaplane - 1925 six-seat biplane floatplane airliner
- K-7B Mail-carrying Aircraft - mail plane modification of K-7A
- K-8 Transport Seaplane - 1926 floatplane mail plane
- K-9 - cargo aircraft project
- K-10 Transport - 1926 mail plane/six-seat airliner
- K-12 Sakura - 1928 experimental long-range record-breaking aircraft

== Sources ==
- Francillon, René J. (1979). Japanese aircraft of the Pacific War. London: Putnam. ISBN 0-370-30251-6. OCLC 6124909. (new edition 1987 by Putnam Aeronautical Books, ISBN 0-85177-801-1.)
- Green, William (1962a). Warplanes of the Second World War: Volume Five, Flying Boats. Macdonald. ISBN 0-356-01449-5. OCLC 655865554.
- Green, William (1962b). War Planes of the Second World War: Volume Six, Floatplanes. Macdonald & Co. ISBN 0-356-01450-9. OCLC 654973389.
- Mikesh, Robert C. and Shorzoe Abe. Japanese Aircraft, 1910–1941. London: Putnam & Company Ltd., 1990. ISBN 0-85177-840-2.
- Richards, M.C. "Kawanishi 4-Motor Flying-Boats (H6K 'Mavis' and H8K 'Emily')". Aircraft in Profile Volume 11. Windsor, Berkshire, UK: Profile Publications Ltd., 1972.
