= Gotha WD.8 =

German reconnaissance floatplane World War I, 1915

WD.8
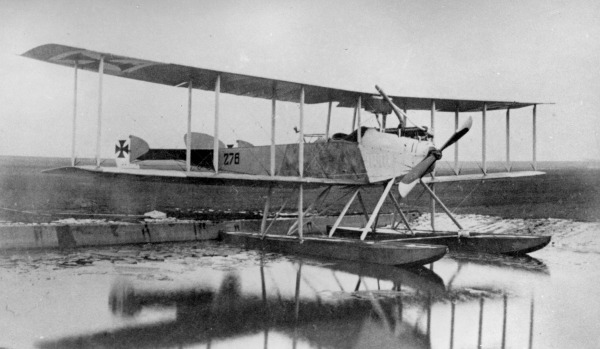
- A forward oblique view of the WD.8

General information
- Type: Maritime reconnaissance aircraft
- National origin: Germany
- Manufacturer: Gothaer Waggonfabrik
- Number built: 1

History
- First flight: 1916

The Gotha WD.8 (Wasser Doppeldecker - "Water Biplane") was a single-engine maritime patrol floatplane developed during World War I by Gothaer Waggonfabrik for the Imperial German Navy's (Kaiserliche Marine) Naval Air Service (Marine-Fliegerabteilung). The WD.8 was a single-engine version of the WD.7 developed for comparative purposes. The single prototype built was deemed "totally unsuitable" by the Naval Air Service and was later sold to the Ottoman Empire.

== Design and description ==
The airframe of the WD.7 was used to create the WD.8 reconnaissance floatplane, substituting a single water-cooled 240-horsepower (180 kW) Maybach Mb.IVa straight-six engine in the nose for the two wing-mounted 120-horsepower (89 kW) engines of the earlier aircraft.

== Specifications ==
Data from Gotha Aircraft of WWI: A Centennial Perspective on Great War Airplanes; German Aircraft of the First World War

General characteristics

- Crew: 2
- Length: 11.2 m (36 ft 9 in)
- Upper wingspan: 16 m (52 ft 6 in)
- Lower wingspan: 14.8 m (48 ft 7 in)
- Height: 4.1 m (13 ft 5 in)
- Wing area: 55.5 m^{2} (597 sq ft)
- Empty weight: 1,254 kg (2,765 lb)
- Gross weight: 1,778 kg (3,920 lb)
- Powerplant: 1 × Maybach Mb.IVa water-cooled straight-six engine, 180 kW (240 hp)
- Propellers: 2-bladed

Performance

- Maximum speed: 138 km/h (86 mph, 75 kn)
- Range: 480 km (300 mi, 260 nmi)
- Service ceiling: 4,500 m (14,800 ft)
- Time to altitude: 6.5 minutes to 1,000 m (3,300 ft)
  - 25 minutes to 2,500 m (8,200 ft)

Armament

- Guns: 1 × fixed, forward-firing 7.92 mm (0.312 in) Parabellum MG 14 machine gun
  - 1 x 7.92 mm Parabellum MG 14 in the rear cockpit

== Bibliography ==
- Gray, Peter & Thetford, Owen (1987) [1970]. German Aircraft of the First World War (2nd ed.). London: Putnam. ISBN 0-85177-809-7.
- Herris, Jack (2013). Gotha Aircraft of WWI: A Centennial Perspective on Great War Airplanes. Great War Aviation Centennial Series. Vol. 6. Charleston, South Carolina: Aeronaut Books. ISBN 978-1-935881-14-8.
- Metzmacher, Andreas (2021). Gotha Aircraft 1913–1954: From the London Bomber to the Flying Wing Jet Fighter. Brimscombe, Stroud: Fonthill. ISBN 978-1-78155-706-8.
- Nowarra, Heinz J.; Robertson, Bruce & Cooksley, Peter G. (1966). Marine Aircraft of the 1914–1918 War. Letchworth, UK: Harleyford Publications. OCLC 123198808.
- Schmeelke, Michael (2018). Zeebrugge: Naval Air Station Flanders I 1914–1918. n. p.: Aeronaut Books. ISBN 978-1-935881-46-9.
