= Kawanishi K-12 Sakura =

Japanese experimental long-range aircraft

K-12 Sakura
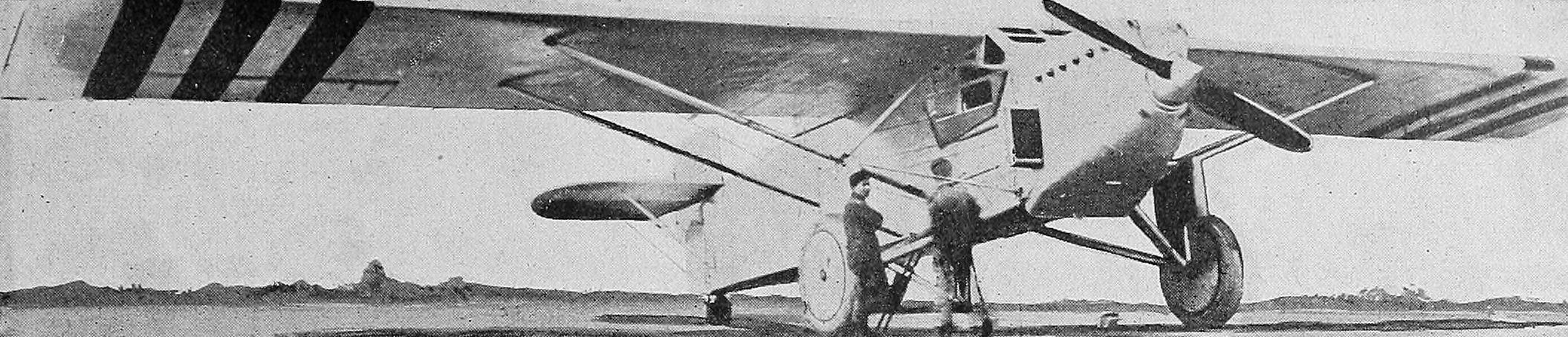

General information
- Type: Long range record breaking aircraft
- National origin: Japan
- Manufacturer: Kawanishi Aircraft Company
- Number built: 2

History
- First flight: 1928

The Kawanishi K-12 Sakura (Japanese: さくら, lit. 'Cherry Blossom') was a Japanese experimental long-range aircraft of the 1920s, intended to be the first aircraft to fly non-stop across the Pacific Ocean. Two examples of the K-12, a single-engined high-winged monoplane were built. As testing showed that its performance was inadequate, it was abandoned, no attempt being made on the trans-Pacific flight.

== Development and design ==
In September 1927 the Japanese aircraft company Kawanishi Engineering Works starting the design of an aircraft meant to carry out a non-stop flight across the Pacific between Japan and the United States, hoping to win a cash prize offered by a major Japanese newspaper for the first aircraft to make such a flight. Kawanishi's design, the K-12 Sakura, was a large high-winged monoplane of all-wooden construction, with a fixed tailwheel undercarriage, powered by a single BMW VI V12 engine, licence built by Kawasaki. Two aircraft were planned, the first to be used for training and as a stand-by for the second aircraft, which was to make the Pacific attempt. When completed in May 1928, it was the largest aircraft to be built yet by Kawanishi, and the largest and heaviest single-engined landplane to be built in Japan.

The aircraft was christened the Nichi-Bei-Go (Japan-US Model), and was planned to carry out the trans-Pacific flight over the North Pacific later in the year. However, during flight testing, it was discovered that the airframe was too heavy and could not carry sufficient fuel to safely make the flight to the United States, with it not being practicable to modify the aircraft to solve these problems. It was therefore abandoned, with the first prototype being left hanging from the ceiling of the assembly shop of the Kawanishi factory for several years, allegedly as an example of "How not to design and build a Special- Purpose Aeroplane".

== Specifications ==
Data from Air Pictorial, February 1963

General characteristics

- Crew: Two
- Length: 11.60 m (38 ft 1 in)
- Wingspan: 19.05 m (62 ft 6 in)
- Height: 3.60 m (11 ft 10 in)
- Wing area: 57.00 m^{2} (613.5 sq ft)
- Empty weight: 1,920 kg (4,233 lb)
- Gross weight: 3,580 kg (7,893 lb)
- Max takeoff weight: 5,500 kg (12,125 lb)
- Powerplant: 1 × BMW VI liquid-cooled V12 engine, 410 kW (550 hp)

Performance

- Maximum speed: 210 km/h (130 mph, 110 kn)
- Range: 5,528 km (3,435 mi, 2,985 nmi) estimates following initial testing
