= Mitsubishi 3MT5 =

Japanese bomber

3MT5
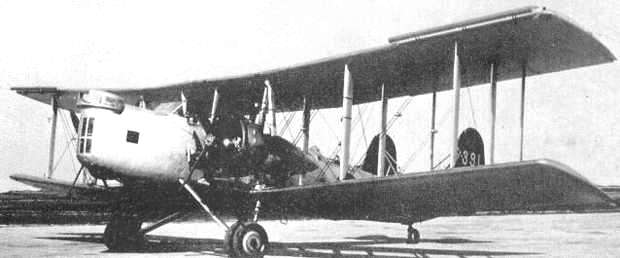

General information
- Type: Bomber
- National origin: Japan
- Manufacturer: Mitsubishi
- Primary user: Imperial Japanese Navy
- Number built: 11

History
- First flight: 19 October 1932

The Mitsubishi 3MT5 was a Japanese bomber of the 1930s. It was a twin-engined biplane that was intended to operate from Japanese aircraft carriers, but proved to be unsuitable for carrier use, and the eleven aircraft built were instead used as land-based trainers.

== Design and development ==
In 1929, the Imperial Japanese Navy Air Service developed a requirement for a large twin-engined carrier-based torpedo-bomber, with an order being placed with Mitsubishi in January 1930. Design of the new aircraft has entrusted to a team led by the British engineer G. E. Petty. The design process was prolonged, as the Navy kept changing their requirements, and the first of eleven prototypes, designated 3MT5 by Mitsubishi and the 7-Shi Twin-engine Carrier Aircraft by the Navy, was completed in September 1932. The new torpedo bomber was a two-bay biplane with folding wings, and was of mixed construction, with a wood and metal fuselage and a metal wing structure with fabric covering. It had a fixed tailwheel undercarriage, and was powered by two Mitsubishi A4 radial engines (later developed into the Mitsubishi Kinsei) driving two-bladed propellers.

The first prototype made its maiden flight on 19 October 1932, with a further three prototypes (all designated 3MT5A by Mitsubishi) being completed in 1932. The remaining five prototypes (3MT5) were completed in 1933 incorporating modifications based on initial testing, with a twin tail replacing the single fin and rudder of the first four aircraft, three-bay wings and four-bladed propellers being fitted. Despite these changes, the aircraft was difficult to control, and suffered from severe vibration, which on one test flight in March 1934, resulted in all four ailerons being torn off the wings of one of the prototypes, which was safely landed. These problems could not be resolved, and the lengthy development meant that the type was now obsolete, so no production followed.

There is sometimes confusion between this aircraft and the 'Mitsubishi Navy 8-shi Experimental Attack Bomber' (also designated Mitsubishi G1M), which was a monoplane, two entirely different aircraft.

== Operational history ==
The 3MT5 was not considered suitable for use aboard aircraft carriers, and was therefore relegated to land-based operations as the Navy Type 93 Land-Based Attack Aircraft. Unfit for combat, it was mainly used as a trainer with the Tateyama Kōkūtai for more modern twin-engined aircraft.

== Designations ==
The Mitsubishi 3MT5 was variously designated:-

Mitsubishi 3MT5
Mitsubishi 3MT5A
Mitsubishi Navy 7-shi Experimental Carrier Attack Bomber
Mitsubishi Navy Type 93 Land Attack Bomber
Mitsubishi G1M (also used for the (8-shi Experimental Attack Bomber))

== Specifications (3MT5) ==
Data from Japanese Aircraft 1910–1941

General characteristics

- Crew: 3–5
- Length: 12.05 m (39 ft 6 in)
- Wingspan: 20.70 m (67 ft 11 in)
- Height: 4.70 m (15 ft 5 in)
- Wing area: 102.3 m^{2} (1,101 sq ft)
- Empty weight: 3,940 kg (8,686 lb)
- Gross weight: 6,400 kg (14,110 lb)
- Powerplant: 2 × Mitsubishi A4 14-cylinder two-row radial engine, 600 kW (800 hp) each
- Propellers: 4-bladed wooden

Performance

- Maximum speed: 235 km/h (146 mph, 127 kn)
- Range: 2,306 km (1,433 mi, 1,245 nmi) (reconnaissance)
- Combat range: 991 km (616 mi, 535 nmi)
- Time to altitude: 3,000 m (9,840 ft) in 13 min

Armament

- Guns: 2× flexibly mounted 7.7 mm machine guns in nose and 1× in dorsal position
- Bombs: 1,000 kg (2,200 lb) bombs or one 800 kg (1760 lb) torpedo
