= Mitsubishi G1M =

Japanese attack bomber

G1M
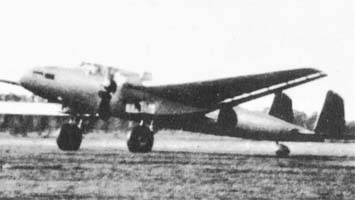

General information
- Type: Long-range reconnaissance aircraft and attack bomber
- National origin: Japan
- Manufacturer: Mitsubishi
- Status: Prototype only
- Number built: 1

History
- First flight: April 1934

The Mitsubishi G1M was a long-range twin-engined attack bomber built by Mitsubishi for the Imperial Japanese Navy in the 1930s.

== Design and development ==
The sole prototype G1M, initially designated Mitsubishi Navy Experimental 8-Shi Special Reconnaissance Aircraft and re-designated Mitsubishi Navy Experimental 8-Shi Land based Medium Attack Aircraft before first flight, was a predecessor of the Mitsubishi G3M, an important step for the Navy air force towards more capable land-based bombers such as the Mitsubishi G4M "Betty".

There is sometimes confusion between this aircraft and the Mitsubishi 3MT5 (also designated 'Mitsubishi G1M' and 'Navy Experimental 7-shi Carrier Attack Bomber'). The 3MT5 was a biplane, and the 8-shi experimental Attack Bomber was a monoplane, two entirely different aircraft.

== Specifications ==
Data from Japanese Aircraft, 1910–1941

General characteristics

- Crew: 5
- Length: 15.83 m (51 ft 11 in)
- Wingspan: 25 m (82 ft 0 in)
- Height: 4.53 m (14 ft 10 in)
- Wing area: 75 m^{2} (810 sq ft)
- Empty weight: 4,775 kg (10,527 lb)
- Gross weight: 7,003 kg (15,439 lb)
- Powerplant: 2 × Hiro Type 91 water-cooled W12 engine, 480 kW (650 hp) each

Performance

- Maximum speed: 266 km/h (165 mph, 143 kn)
- Range: 4,408 km (2,739 mi, 2,380 nmi)
- Service ceiling: 4,600 m (15,100 ft)
- Time to altitude: 16 min 54 sec to 3,000 m (9,800 ft)

Armament

- Guns: 2× flexibly mounted 7.7 mm machine guns (one mounted in the nose and one in dorsal position)
