= Albatros L 58 =

L 58
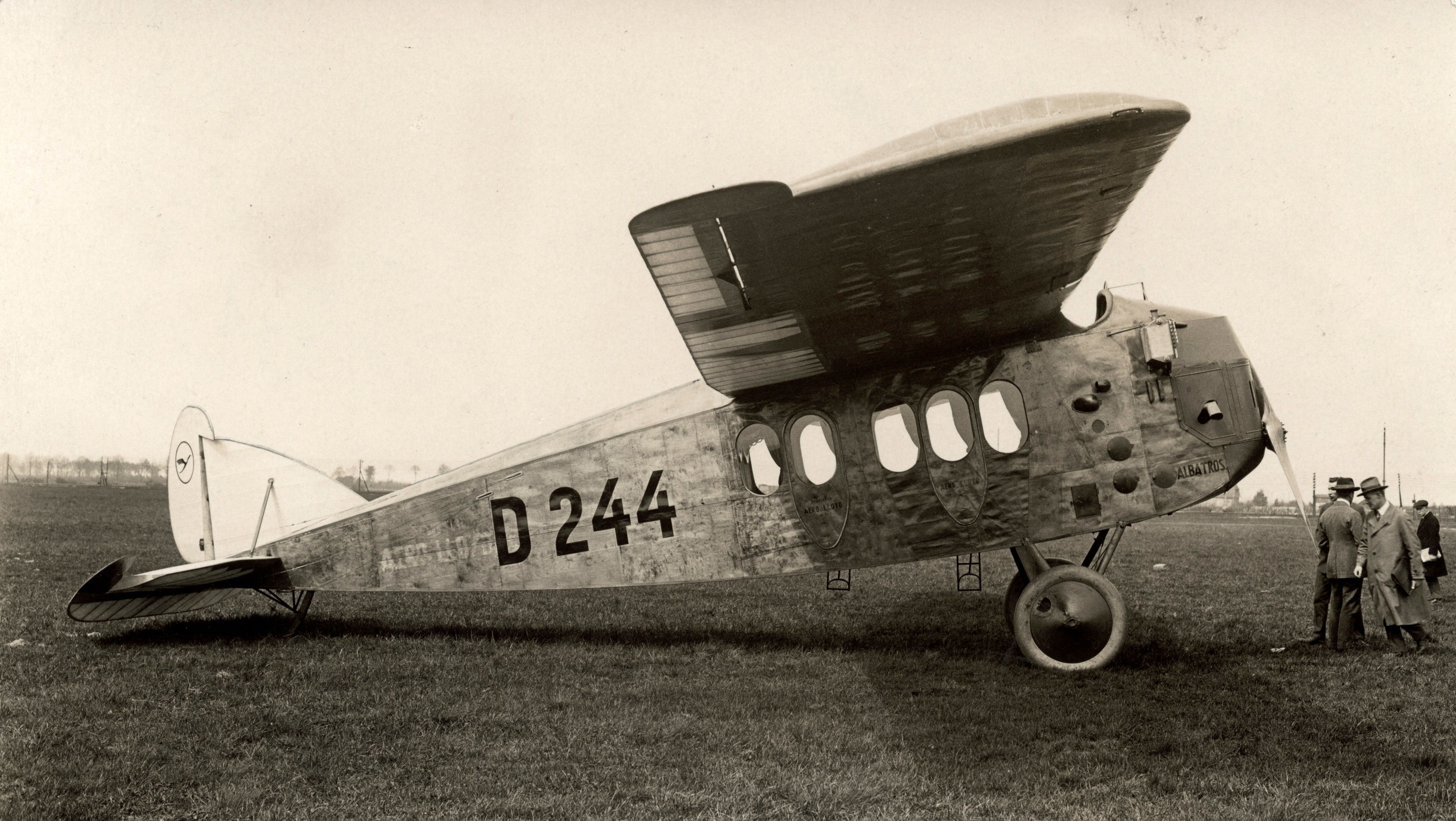

General information
- Type: Airliner
- Manufacturer: Albatros Flugzeugwerke
- Primary user: Deutsche Luft Hansa and its predecessor companies
- Number built: 7

History
- First flight: 1923

The Albatros L 58 was a German airliner of the 1920s. It was a single-engine cantilever monoplane which accommodated the pilot in an open cockpit at the top of the fuselage, and seated five-six passengers within it.

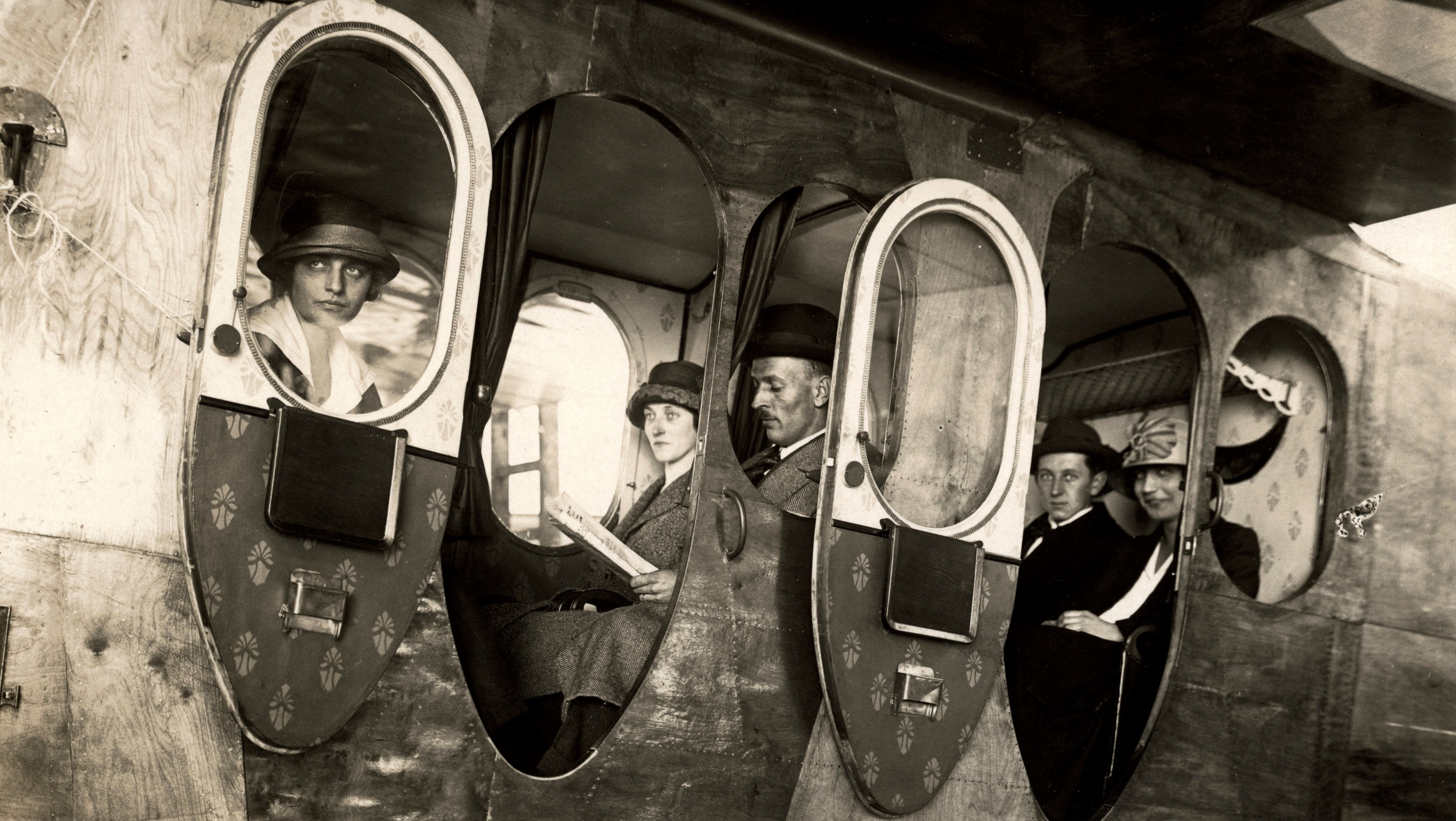

== Variants ==
- L 58 – original production version with Maybach Mb.IVa engine and eight-passenger capacity
- L 58a – version with Rolls-Royce Eagle VIII engine and six-passenger capacity

== Operators ==
- Germany
  - Deutsche Luftreederei
  - Deutsche Aero-Lloyd
  - Deutsche Luft Hansa

== Specifications (L 58) ==
General characteristics

- Crew: one pilot
- Capacity: 5 passengers
- Length: 10.89 m (35 ft 9 in)
- Wingspan: 18.00 m (59 ft 0 in)
- Height: 3.80 m (12 ft 6 in)
- Wing area: 44.5 m^{2} (479 sq ft)
- Empty weight: 1,370 kg (3,020 lb)
- Gross weight: 2,250 kg (4,960 lb)
- Powerplant: 1 × Maybach Mb.IVa , 180 kW (240 hp)

Performance

- Maximum speed: 150 km/h (90 mph, 78 kn)
- Range: 540 km (340 mi, 300 nmi)
- Service ceiling: 3,500 m (11,500 ft)
- Rate of climb: 1.4 m/s (280 ft/min)
