= Aichi AB-4 =

Japanese reconnaissance flying boat prototype

AB-4
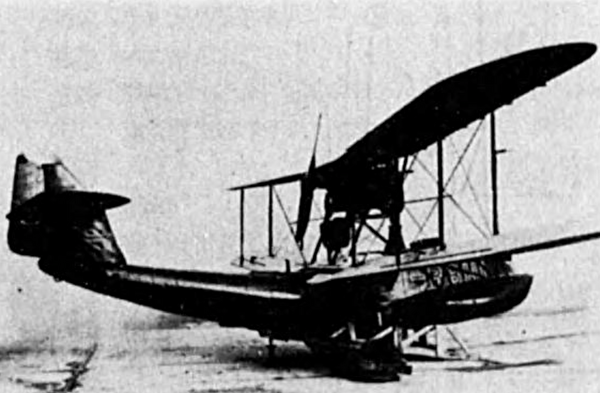

General information
- Type: Night reconnaissance flying boat
- National origin: Japan
- Manufacturer: Aichi Kokuki
- Primary users: Imperial Japanese Navy Nippon Koku Yuso Kenkyusho
- Number built: 6

History
- First flight: May 1932

The Aichi AB-4 was a Japanese flying boat of the 1930s. A single engined biplane, the AB-4 was intended to carry out night reconnaissance for the Imperial Japanese Navy. Six were built and accepted into service as the Experimental 6-Shi Night Reconnaissance Flying boat, three of which were converted to civil transports.

== Development and design ==
In 1931, the Imperial Japanese Navy instructed the Aichi Tokei Denki Seizo KK. (Aichi Watch and Electric Machinery Company, Ltd), who had been involved in aircraft manufacture, particularly for the Navy, since 1920, to design a small catapult-launched night reconnaissance aircraft, intended to observe nocturnal shipping movements, spot naval gunfire during night engagements and to direct friendly submarines. The resulting design, designated AB-4 ("Aichi Biplane") by Aichi was a single-engined pusher biplane flying boat of all-metal construction. Its single-bay wings folded backwards for storage aboard ship, while its crew of three were housed in open cockpits. It was powered by a single Gasuden Urakaze water-cooled six-cylinder inline engine driving a two blade propeller.

The first prototype flew in May 1932, and while handling was generally good, it had poor control during take-off and landing, and a poor view for the pilot. Despite this, a further five prototypes were ordered for evaluation.

== Operational history ==
The six prototypes, designated Experimental 6-Shi Night Reconnaissance Flying Boat were subject to extensive testing and evaluation by the Japanese Navy. While the Navy decided not to order further production of the AB-4, it had a continued requirement for a dedicated night reconnaissance aircraft, which resulted in the Specification that led to the Aichi E10A, which entered service in 1936.

In 1935, three of the six AB-4s were sold to the Japanese Airline Nippon Koku Yuso Kenkyusho, (NKYK). The first aircraft was converted to a cargo transport, while the second and third aircraft were converted to passenger airliners, with the pilot's cockpit moved to the extreme nose (replacing the existing gunners position) and an enclosed passenger cabin, for five and six passengers respectively, added. The third prototype replaced the Gasuden engine with a more powerful Napier Lion.

The three AB-4s were used by NKYK in scheduled services from Osaka, and for sightseeing flights. One crashed into a factory chimney on 27 May 1937, killing all five aboard.

== Specifications (Experimental 6-Shi Night Reconnaissance Flying boat) ==
Data from Japanese Aircraft 1910-1941

General characteristics

- Crew: 3
- Length: 9.75 m (32 ft 0 in)
- Wingspan: 13.5 m (44 ft 3 in)
- Height: 3.94 m (12 ft 11 in)
- Wing area: 47.1 m^{2} (507 sq ft)
- Empty weight: 1,610 kg (3,549 lb)
- Gross weight: 2,350 kg (5,181 lb)
- Max takeoff weight: 2,600 kg (5,732 lb) when catapult-launched
- Powerplant: 1 × Gasuden Urakaze 6-cylinder water-cooled inverted in-line piston engine 220–250 kW (300–330 hp)
- Propellers: 2-bladed wooden fixed-pitch pusher propeller

Performance

- Maximum speed: 164 km/h (102 mph, 89 kn)
- Cruise speed: 113 km/h (70 mph, 61 kn)
- Stall speed: 84 km/h (52 mph, 45 kn) at 1,000 m (3,300 ft)
- Service ceiling: 3,500 m (11,500 ft)
- Time to altitude: 2,800 m (9,200 ft) in 60 minutes 50 seconds
- Wing loading: 50 kg/m^{2} (10 lb/sq ft)
- Power/mass: 0.095 kW/kg (0.058 hp/lb)

Armament

- Guns: 1× 7.7 mm (0.303 in) machine gun on a flexible mount in the bow cockpit
- Bombs: Flares

== See also ==
Aircraft of comparable role, configuration, and era

- Aichi E10A
- Aichi E11A
