= Hiro H4H =

Japanese flying boat

H4H
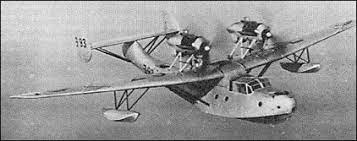

General information
- Type: Patrol flying boat
- National origin: Japan
- Manufacturer: Hiro Naval Arsenal
- Primary user: IJN Air Service
- Number built: 47

History
- Introduction date: 1933
- First flight: 1931

The Hiro H4H (or Hiro Navy Type 91 Flying Boat) was a 1930s Japanese bomber or reconnaissance monoplane flying boat designed and built by the Hiro Naval Arsenal for the Imperial Japanese Navy.

== Design and development ==
First appearing in 1931, the H4H1 was a twin-engined, high-wing monoplane flying boat. Powered by two 500 hp (597 kW) Hiro 91-1 engines strut-mounted above the wing, it was produced by the Kawanishi company and entered service in 1933.

An improved version of the design, the H4H2, followed into production two years later. The H4H2 had redesigned twin fins and rudders and was powered by two 800 hp (597 kW) Myojo radial engines. A total of 47 aircraft of both versions were produced.

Both the H4H1 and H4H2 remained in front-line naval service through the 1930s.

== Variants ==
H4H1 (Hiro Navy Type 91 Model 1 Flying Boat)
Variant powered by two 500hp (597kW) Hiro 91-1 engines.
H4H2 (Hiro Navy Type 91 Model 2 Flying Boat)
Variant powered by two 800hp (597kW) Myojo radial engines.

== Operators ==
Japan

- Imperial Japanese Navy Air Service

== Specifications (H4H2) ==
Data from

General characteristics

- Length: 54 ft 4.25 in (16.57 m)
- Wingspan: 76 ft 11.5 in (23.46 m)
- Height: 20 ft 5 in (6.22 m)
- Wing area: 890.20 sq ft (82.70 m^{2})
- Empty weight: 10,280 lb (4,663 kg)
- Gross weight: 16,534 lb (7,500 kg)
- Powerplant: 2 × Myojo radial piston engine , 800 hp (597 kW) each

Performance

- Maximum speed: 145 mph (233 km/h, 126 kn)
- Range: 793 mi (1,260 km, 689 nmi)
- Service ceiling: 11,880 ft (3,620 m)

Armament

- 1 × 7.7mm (0.303in) Machine Gun (mounted over bow cockpit)
- 2 × 7.7mm (0.303in) Machine Guns (mounted over midship cockpit)
- 2 × 250kg (551lb) bombs

== See also ==
Related lists

- List of military aircraft of Japan
- List of seaplanes and flying boats
