= Kawanishi E7K =

Japanese reconnaissance floatplane

E7K
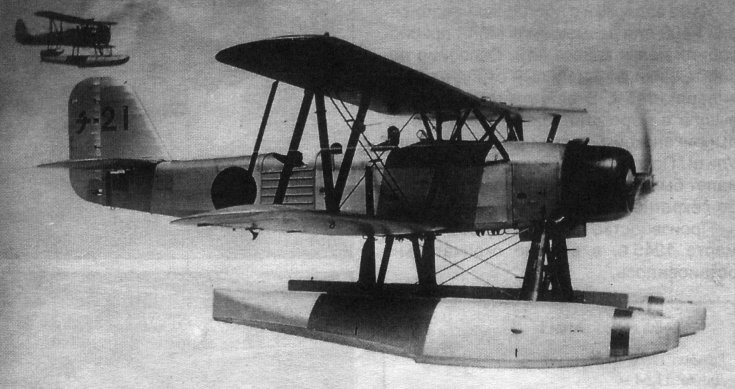

General information
- Type: reconnaissance floatplane
- Manufacturer: Kawanishi Aircraft Company
- Primary user: IJN Air Service
- Number built: 533

History
- Introduction date: 1935
- First flight: 6 February 1933
- Retired: 1943

The Kawanishi E7K was a three-seat reconnaissance seaplane that was designed and produced by the Japanese aviation manufacturer Kawanishi Aircraft Company. It was allocated the reporting name Alf by the Allies.

The initial model of the aircraft, the E7K1, had been designed in response to a request from the Imperial Japanese Navy (IJN) for a successor to the Kawanishi E5K. Powered by a single Hiro Type 91 W-12 inline engine, the prototype E7K1 made its maiden flight on 6 February 1933. The type was ordered into production under the designation Navy Type 94 Reconnaissance Seaplane. Introduced to IJN service in 1935, the aircraft was relatively popular, but proved to be somewhat unreliable due to engine-related difficulties. In August 1938, the first E7K2, powered by a Mitsubishi MK2 Zuisei 11 radial engine, made its first flight; this model would also be procured by the IJN under the Navy Type 94 Reconnaissance Seaplane Model 2 designation. While the majority of aircraft completed were produced by Kawanishi, a minority of both E7K1s and E7K2s ere assembled by another manufacturer, Nippon Hikoki K.K., as well.

By the start of the Pacific War, the E7K1 was considered to be obsolete and thus was largely relegated to secondary roles as a trainer and liaison aircraft. The newer E7K2 did see frontline use, performing convey escort, anti submarine patrol, and aerial reconnaissance missions, into 1943. Both models were used in the closing months of the conflict to conduct kamikazi attacks.

== Design and development ==
In February 1932, the Imperial Japanese Navy (IJN) requested the Kawanishi Aircraft Company produce a replacement for the company's earlier Kawanishi E5K as part of the 7-Shi requirement, which also resulted in the Hiro G2H. Kawanishi's design team, headed by Eiji Sekiguchi, quickly produced a response, the design being internally designated as the Model J and subsiquently assigned the designation E7K1. In terms of its general configuration, it was an equal span biplane equipped with twin floats. The E7K1 was powered by a single Hiro Type 91 W-12 liquid-cooled inline engine, capable of producing up to 462 kW (620 hp), that drove a twin-bladed wooden propeller. Defensive armament comprised as single forward-facing 7.7 mm machine gun, a flexibly-mounted rear-facing machine gun, and a third machine gun that faced downwards and rearwards. Bomb racks were also installed under the wing's center-section to carry up to four 30 kg bombs. The aircraft's crew of three (the pilot, observer, and radio operator) were seated individually within open cockpits.

The first prototype conducted its maiden flight on 6 February 1933, less than a year after design work had commenced. This prototype was handed over to the IJN for service trials three months later. These trials were competitive, being flown against the competing Aichi AB-6, which had also been designed to fulfil the same 7-Shi requirement. Reportedly, the Kawanishi aircraft demonstrated superior performance and handling to the AB-6. In late 1933, a second E7K1 prototype was delivered to the IJN. In May 1934, the E7K1 was ordered into production as the Navy Type 94 Reconnaissance Seaplane (九四式水上偵察機).

It entered service with the IJN in early 1935. In response to high demand, a second production line for the type was set up in April 1937, operated by Nippon Hikoki K.K.. Operations of the E7K1 were often hindered by the unreliability of its Hiro engine. While later production E7K1s were fitted with a more powerful version of the Hiro 91, but this change did not meaningfully improve reliability. In 1938, Kawanishi developed an improved E7K2 that was powered by a Mitsubishi MK2 Zuisei 11 radial engine that drove a four-bladed propeller instead; it made its first flight in August 1938. Three months later, the E7K2 was ordered into production by the IJN as the Navy Type 94 Reconnaissance Seaplane Model 2, while the earlier E7K1 was redesignated to Navy Type 94 Reconnaissance Seaplane Model 1.

== Operational history ==
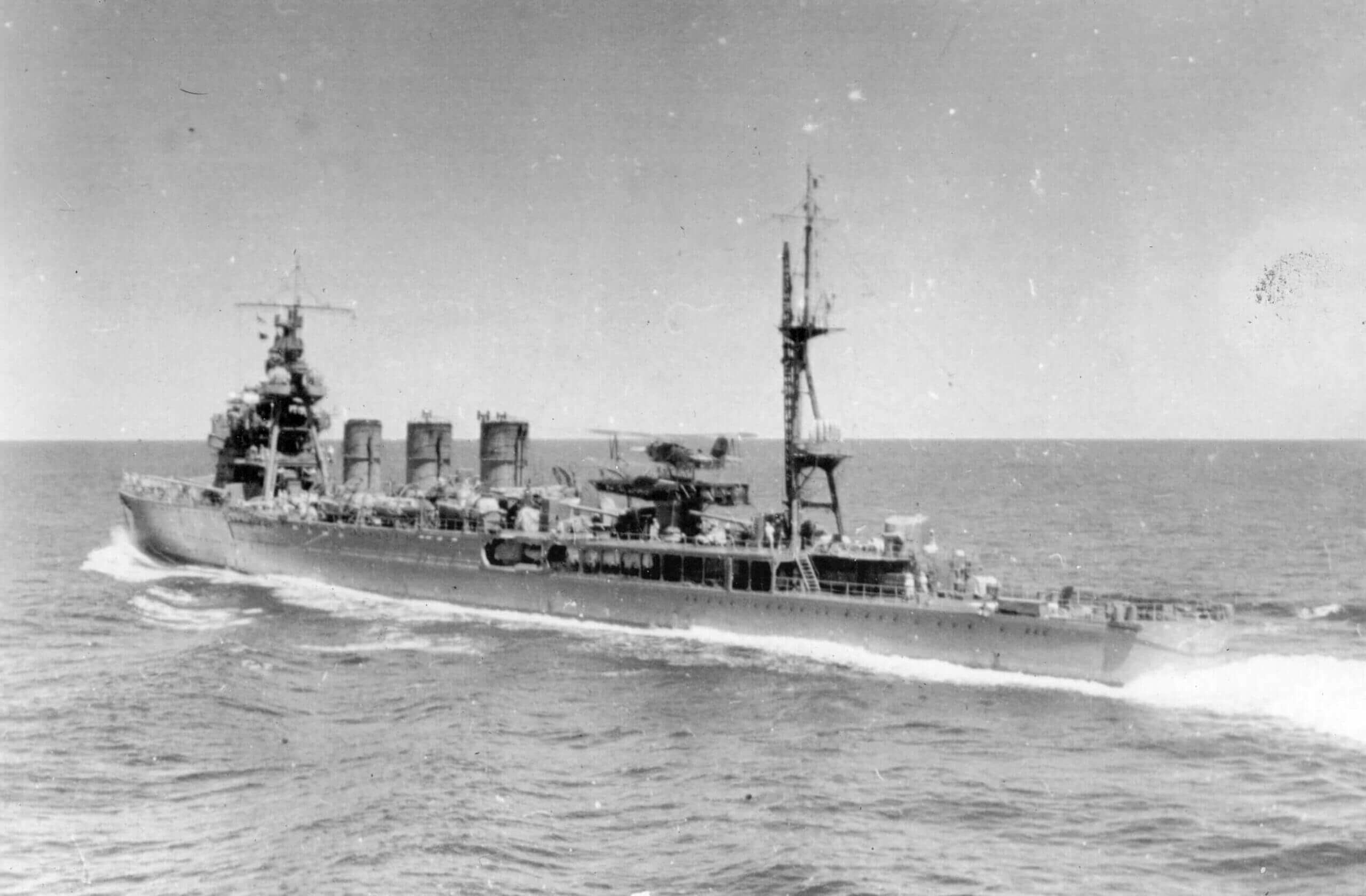
E7K2 ready for launch aboard the cruiser Abukuma, 1941

Introduced to operational service in early 1935, the E7K was operated from various warships, shore bases, and seaplane tenders to perform coastal patrol and maritime reconnaissance. It quickly garnered a reputation for being relatively easy to handle; this attribute may have contributed to the type's selection for several experimental programmes, including its use as a mothership for the Yokosuka MXY4 radio controlled drone.

The IJN made extensive use of the type throughout the late 1930s up to the beginning of the Pacific War in December 1941, by which point the aircraft was considered to be approaching obsolesce. Thereafter, the remaining E7K1s were relegated to second-line roles, these typically being training and liaison duties. The more capable E7K2 continued in front-line service with the IJN until 1943. These aircraft were typically used to conduct convey escort, anti submarine patrol, and aerial reconnaissance missions.

During the closing stages of the conflict, the remaining aircraft of both versions were expended in kamikaze attacks upon the forces of the advancing Allies.

== Variants ==
E7K1
Production version with a Hiro Type 91 520 hp water-cooled W-12 engine, 183 built (including 57 built by Nippon Hikoki K.K.)
E7K2
Re-engined version with a Mitsubishi Zuisei 11 radial engine, about 350 built (including 60 built by Nippon Hikoki K.K.)

== Operators ==
Japan

- Imperial Japanese Navy Air Service

== Specifications (E7K2) ==
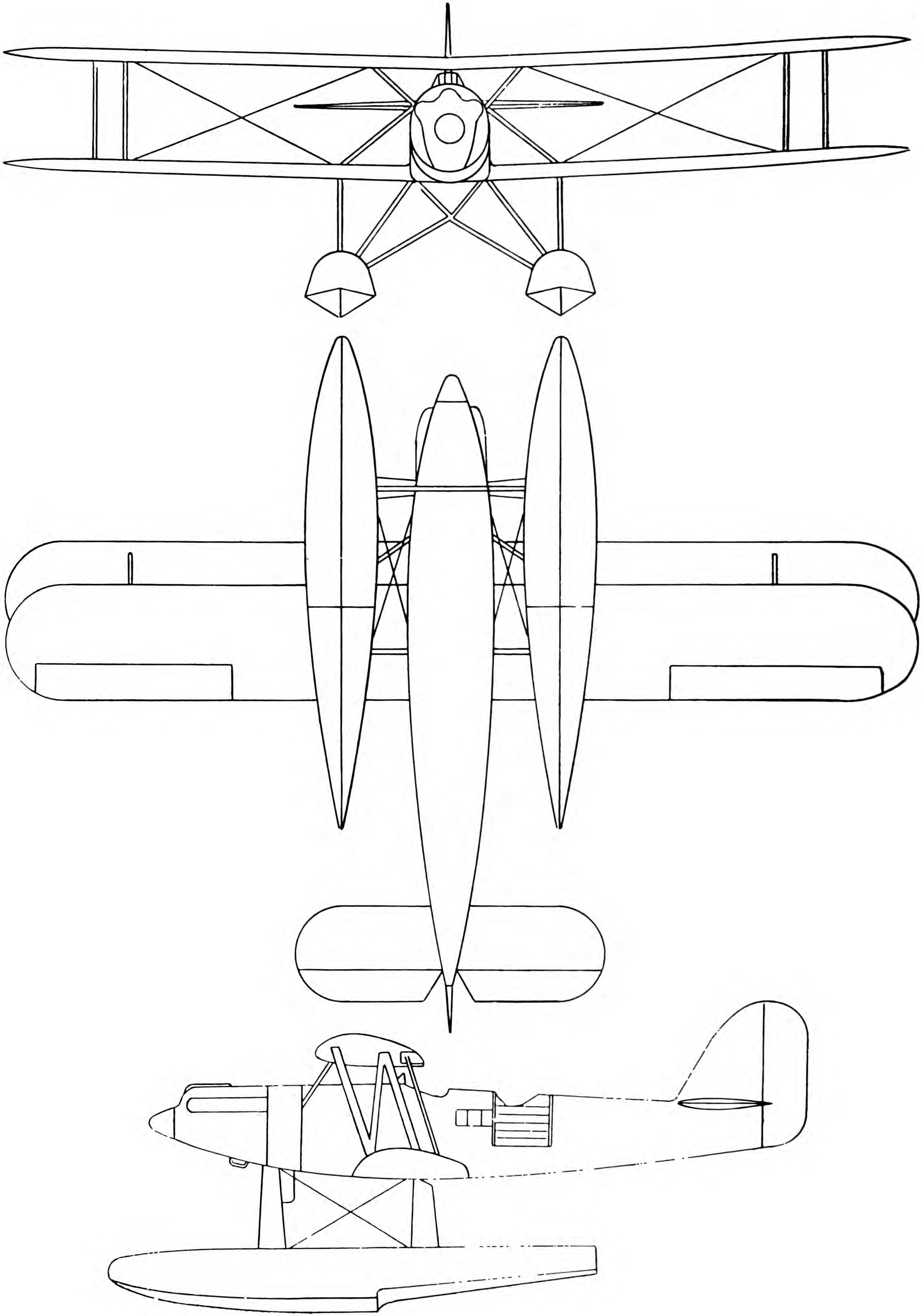
3-view drawing of the Kawanishi E7K

Data from Japanese Aircraft of the Pacific War, War Planes of the Second World War

General characteristics

- Crew: 3
- Length: 10.41 m (34 ft 2 in)
- Wingspan: 14 m (45 ft 11 in)
- Height: 4.85 m (15 ft 11 in)
- Wing area: 43.6 m^{2} (469 sq ft)
- Empty weight: 2,100 kg (4,630 lb)
- Gross weight: 3,300 kg (7,275 lb)
- Powerplant: 1 × Mitsubishi MK2 Zuisei 11 14-cylinder air-cooled radial piston engine, 650 kW (870 hp) for take-off

- 630 kW (850 hp) at 2,300 m (7,500 ft)

- Propellers: 2-bladed metal propeller

Performance

- Maximum speed: 276 km/h (171 mph, 149 kn) at 2,000 m (6,600 ft)
- Cruise speed: 185 km/h (115 mph, 100 kn) at 1,000 m (3,300 ft)
- Endurance: 11 hours and 19 minutes
- Time to altitude: 3,000 m (9,800 ft) in nine minutes and six seconds
- Wing loading: 75.7 kg/m^{2} (15.5 lb/sq ft)
- Power/mass: 0.196 kW/kg (0.119 hp/lb)

Armament

- Guns: 1× fixed Type 97 aircraft machine gun (Vickers) and 2× trainable 7.7 mm (0.303 in) Type 92 machine guns (Lewis gun), one dorsal, one ventral
- Bombs: 120 kg (264.6 lb) of bombs

== See also ==
Aircraft of comparable role, configuration, and era

- Aichi AB-6

Related lists

- List of aircraft of World War II
- List of military aircraft of Japan
- List of seaplanes and flying boats
