= Hiro Type 91 =

W12 piston aircraft engine

Type 91
- Type: W-12 water-cooled piston engine
- National origin: Japan
- Manufacturer: Hiro Naval Arsenal
- Developed from: Hiro Type 90

The Hiro Type 91, (full designation Hiro Type 91 520 hp water-cooled W-12), was a 12-cylinder, water-cooled, W engine developed for aircraft use by the Imperial Japanese Navy in the mid-1930s. Power was in the 450 kW (600 hp) range. Its design was derived from the Hiro Type 90. An enlarged more powerful engine, the Hiro Type 90 600 hp water-cooled W-12 had also been developed, producing 600 hp.

== Applications ==
- Aichi E10A
- Aichi E11A
- Hiro H4H
- Kawanishi E7K
- Mitsubishi Ka-9

== Specifications (Type 91 500hp-1) ==
=== General characteristics ===
- Type: 12-cylinder water-cooled W-block (3 banks of 4 cylinders) aircraft piston engine
- Bore: 135 mm
- Stroke: 160 mm
- Displacement: 27.5 L

=== Components ===
- Cooling system: Liquid-cooled

=== Performance ===
- Power output:
- 620 PS for takeoff
- 520 hp for max continuous

== See also ==
Related lists

- List of aircraft engines
