= Aichi E10A =

1934 flying boat by Aichi

E10A
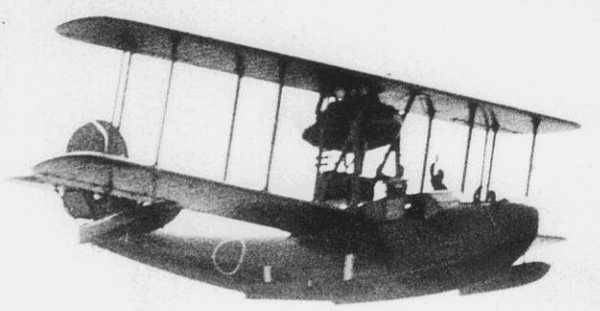

General information
- Type: Night reconnaissance flying boat
- National origin: Japan
- Manufacturer: Aichi Kokuki
- Primary user: Imperial Japanese Navy
- Number built: 15

History
- Introduction date: 1936
- First flight: 1934
- Retired: 1941

The Aichi E10A was a Japanese night reconnaissance flying boat of the 1930s. A single-engined biplane, 15 were built for the Imperial Japanese Navy as the Type 96 Night Reconnaissance Seaplane, serving from 1936 but were retired in 1941 before the Attack on Pearl Harbor.

== Development and design ==
In 1934, based on experience of testing the Experimental 6-Shi Night Reconnaissance Flying boat, the Imperial Japanese Navy drew up a specification for a new night reconnaissance aircraft, intended to shadow enemy fleets during the cover of darkness, with orders being placed with Aichi and with Kawanishi.

Aichi's design, with the company designation AB-12, was a single-engined biplane flying boat of all-metal construction. Its two-bay wings folded rearwards to save space on board ship, while its crew of three were accommodated in an enclosed cabin. It was powered by a pusher water-cooled Aichi Type 91 engine, driving a four-blade wooden propeller.

The first prototype flew in December 1934, and when tested proved to have superior stability to the competing Kawanishi E10K, and so was ordered into production.

== Operational history ==
The AB-12 entered service in August 1936 with the Japanese Navy as the Type 96 Night Reconnaissance Seaplane, with the short designation E10A. Fifteen aircraft were built, remaining in service until 1941, being phased out before the Japanese Attack on Pearl Harbor. Despite this, it was assigned the Allied code name Hank.

== Specifications (E10A) ==
Data from Japanese Aircraft 1910-1941

General characteristics

- Crew: 3
- Length: 11.219 m (36 ft 10 in)
- Wingspan: 15.5 m (50 ft 10 in)
- Height: 4.5 m (14 ft 9 in)
- Wing area: 52.1 m^{2} (561 sq ft)
- Empty weight: 2,100 kg (4,630 lb)
- Gross weight: 3,300 kg (7,275 lb)
- Powerplant: × Aichi Type 91 W-12 water-cooled piston engine, 370 kW (500 hp) to 480 kW (650 hp)
- Propellers: 4-bladed wooden fixed-pitch pusher propeller

Performance

- Maximum speed: 206 km/h (128 mph, 111 kn) at sea level
- Cruise speed: 106 km/h (66 mph, 57 kn) at 1,000 m (3,300 ft)
- Range: 1,852 km (1,151 mi, 1,000 nmi)
- Service ceiling: 4,120 m (13,520 ft)
- Time to altitude: 3,000 m (9,800 ft) in 17 minutes 42 seconds
- Wing loading: 63.2 kg/m^{2} (12.9 lb/sq ft)
- Power/mass: 0.113 kW/kg (0.069 hp/lb)

Armament

- Guns: 1× 7.7 mm machine gun flexibly mounted in nose

== See also ==
Aircraft of comparable role, configuration, and era

- Aichi AB-4
- Aichi E11A
- Supermarine Walrus
