= Kawanishi K-7 Transport Seaplane =

Japanese floatplane airliner

K-7 Transport Seaplane

General information
- Type: Airliner
- National origin: Japan
- Manufacturer: Kawanishi Aircraft Company
- Designer: Eiji Sekiguchi
- Primary user: Nippon Koku KK
- Number built: 11

History
- Introduction date: 1925
- First flight: 1924

The Kawanishi K-7 Transport Seaplane was a Japanese single-engined biplane floatplane of the 1920s. Eleven were built from 1924 to 1927, being used to carry passengers and airmail.

== Design and development ==
In December 1923, Eiji Sekiguchi, chief designer of the aircraft department of Kawanishi Kikai Setsakuho (Kawanishi Machinery Manufacturing Works), started design of a new high speed transport floatplane to equip Nippon Koku KK (Japan Aviation Co. Ltd.), an airline subsidiary of Kawanishi. Sekiguchi designed a single-engined sesquiplane (i.e. a biplane with the lower wing much smaller than the upper wing) of all-wooden construction. Seating for four passengers was provided in an enclosed cabin, while the aircraft's two pilots sat in individual open tandem cockpits aft of the passenger cabin. The aircraft was powered by a single Maybach Mb.IVa water-cooled inline-engine providing 305 hp (228 kW), an engine type usually used to power Zeppelins or Riesenflugzeug like the Zeppelin-Staaken R.VI, received as part of Germany's reparations to Japan after the end of the First World War.

The first example of the new aircraft, the K-7A Transport Seaplane was completed in November 1924, demonstrating both good performance and handling. A further nine K-7As were built by the time production ended in 1927, together with a single example of the K-7B Mail-Carrying Aircraft, a modified version that could be operated either on floats or with a tailwheel undercarriage.

== Operational history ==
The K-7A entered service on Nippon Koku's service between Osaka and Fukuoka in January 1925, mainly carrying airmail rather than passengers. The K-7A proved successful in service, one carrying mail from Fukuoka and Shanghai, China, a distance of over 950 kilometers (590 mi) in May 1926, while the K-7B was used together with the Kawanishi K-10 Transport to operate an airmail route between Osaka and the Japanese occupied city of Dalian in September 1926. The K-7A continued in use until 1929, when Nippon Koku was forced to be disbanded, with its routes transferred to the government owned Nihon Koko Yuso KK (Japan Air Transport).

== Variants ==
K-7A Transport Seaplane
Six-seat airliner/transport floatplane, powered by Maybach MIVa engine. Ten built.
K-7B Mail-carrying Aircraft
Modified version of K-7A, capable of operating with a fixed tailwheel undercarriage or floats, powered by 440 hp (328 kW) Lorraine 1 V12 engine. One built in 1925.

== Operators ==
Japan

- Dai Nippon Kōkū Kabushiki Kaisha The Imperial Japanese Airways, in short Nippon Koku KK.

== Specifications (K-7A) ==
Data from Japanese Aircraft 1910–1941

General characteristics

- Crew: 2
- Capacity: 4 passengers
- Length: 11 m (36 ft 1 in)
- Wingspan: 12 m (39 ft 4 in)
- Height: 4.08 m (13 ft 5 in)
- Wing area: 34 m^{2} (370 sq ft)
- Empty weight: 1,250 kg (2,756 lb)
- Gross weight: 2,000 kg (4,409 lb)
- Powerplant: 1 × Maybach Mb.IVa water-cooled six-cylinder inline engine, 227 kW (305 hp)

Performance

- Maximum speed: 196 km/h (122 mph, 106 kn) at sea level
- Endurance: 6 hr
- Service ceiling: 6,000 m (20,000 ft)
