= Kawanishi K-1 =

Japanese mail plane

General information
- Type: Mail carrier
- National origin: Japan
- Manufacturer: Kawanishi Aircraft
- Designer: Eiji Sekiguchi
- Number built: 1

History
- First flight: December 1920 - early 1921

Kawanishi's first aircraft, the Kawanishi K-1, was designed as a mail carrier. It was the first Japanese aircraft to receive a Certificate of Airworthiness from the Aviation Bureau. It won a prize in a national contest but was not a commercial success and only one was built.

== Design and development ==
Design work on the K-1 began in February 1921 and construction was completed in December 1920. It had an American engine and was influenced by current American engineering practices.

With an all-wood structure and fabric covering it was a two bay biplane with rectangular plan wings, each bay separated by parallel pairs of interplane struts. The upper wing was joined to the fuselage by a cabane formed by parallel pairs of short struts on each side. The lower wing passed just below the fuselage.

The K-1 was powered by a 200–244 hp (149–182 kW) Hall-Scott L-6 water-cooled six cylinder inline mounted in a bullet-shaped nose. Behind the engine the fuselage was flat-sided with rounded decking. There were two open cockpits close together, the forward one under the trailing edge of the wing, which had a cut-out to improve the upward field of view. The tail was conventional with generous horizontal surfaces mounted on top of the fuselage.

Its landing gear was fixed and conventional with a short tail skid but details of the main legs and wheels are lacking.

The first flight was made around the turn of 1920-1. Later, it was re-engined with a 180 hp (130 kW) Daimler engine and directional stability was improved was increased with a new, long, low, flat-topped fin of greater area.

== Operational history ==
In May 1921, quite soon after the first flight, the K-1 competed in the Second Prize-winning Flight Competition, sponsored by the Imperial Flying Association. Flown by Yukicho Goto, it won the distance prize with a flight of 686 km (426 mi; 370 nmi) in 4 hr 50 min. It also gained second prize in the speed contest, reaching 192 km/h (119 mph; 104 kn).

The Japanese Aviation Bureau began issuing Certificates of Airworthiness on 11 May 1921 and the K-1 received the first of these.

Despite its competition success, the K-1 was not accepted as a commercial mail carrier and only one was built.

== Specifications ==
Data from Japanese Aircraft 1910-1941.

General characteristics

- Crew: Two
- Length: 7.50 m (24 ft 7 in)
- Wingspan: 10 m (32 ft 10 in)
- Height: 2.55 m (8 ft 4 in)
- Wing area: 28.5 m^{2} (307 sq ft)
- Airfoil: USA 1
- Empty weight: 775 kg (1,709 lb)
- Gross weight: 1,159 kg (2,555 lb)
- Powerplant: 1 × Hall-Scott L-6 water-cooled six cylinder inline
- Propellers: 2-bladed wooden

Performance

- Maximum speed: 200 km/h (124 mph, 108 kn)
- Landing speed: 85 km/h (53 mph; 46 kn)
- Endurance: 5 hr
- Service ceiling: 6,000 m (20,000 ft)
