= Maybach Mb.IVa =

Mb IVa
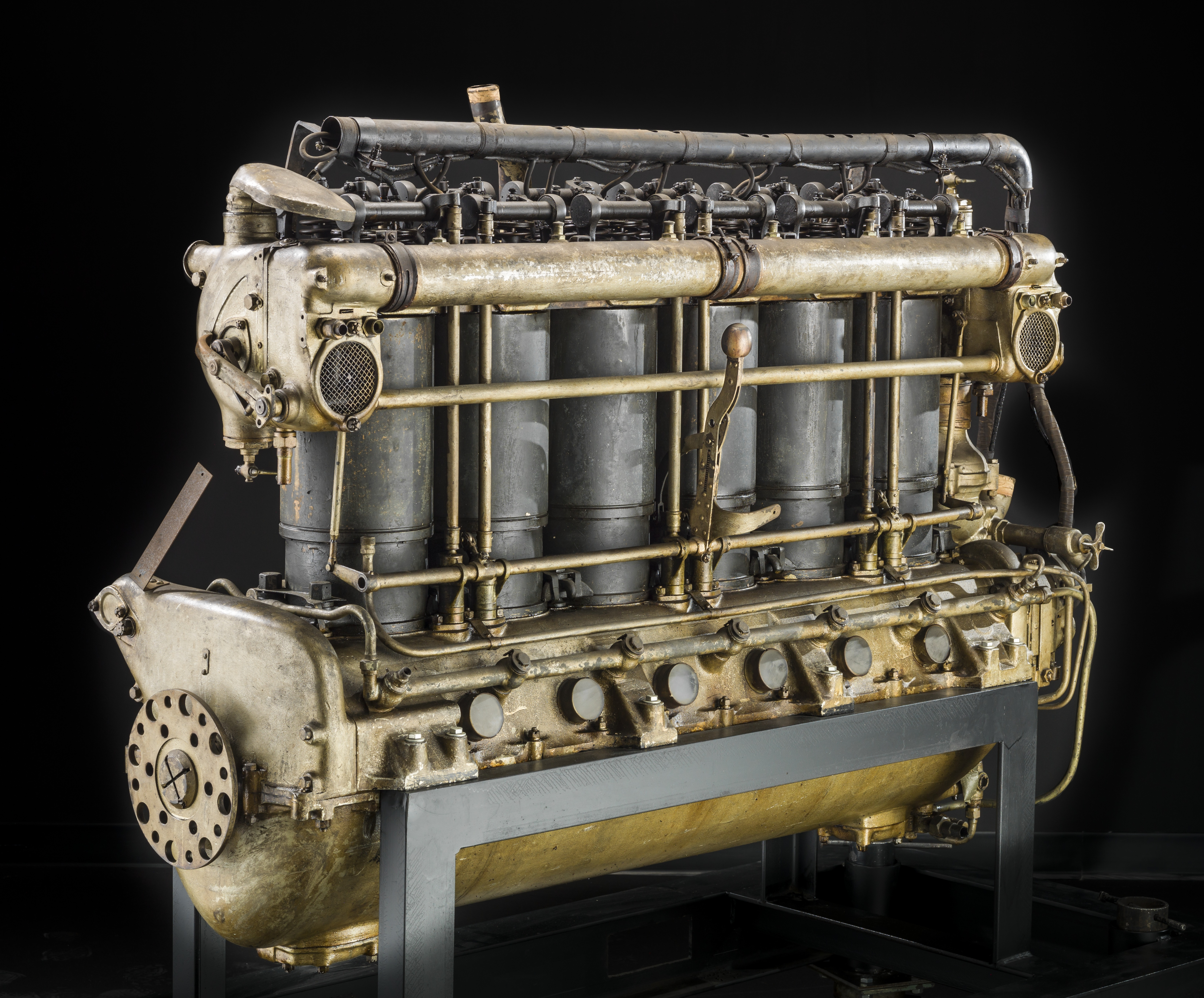
- Mb IVa at the National Air and Space Museum
- Type: 6-cyl water-cooled in-line piston engine
- National origin: Germany
- Manufacturer: Maybach-Motorenbau GmbH
- Designer: Karl Maybach
- Major applications: Zeppelin airships (LZ 105 to 114)
- Manufactured: 1916–1918

The Maybach Mb IVa was a water-cooled aircraft and airship straight-six engine developed in Germany during World War I by Maybach-Motorenbau GmbH, a subsidiary of Zeppelin. It was one of the world's first series-produced engines designed specifically for high-altitude use. It was quite a different engine design than the previous, five valves per cylinder Maybach Mb.IV, not just a simple modification.

== Design and development ==
Like all engines of that time, the previous Maybach design, the Mb IV, lost as much as half of the nominal power of 240 horsepower at high altitude. The new Maybach Mb IVa of 1916 was the first engine designed to overcome this limitation. It did not use a supercharger, but a much more primitive solution. The engine had purposely "oversized" cylinders, and a significantly higher 6.08:1 compression ratio. It was tested on Wendelstein (mountain) at an altitude of 1800 m and rated there at 245 hp. This would theoretically correspond to rating of about 300 hp at sea level; however, the engine was not designed to withstand such power - it needed to be carefully throttled down at low altitude, so it would not exceed the safe level of 245 hp. It had three carburettor settings, to be changed during the flight depending on the altitude.

The engine was falsely given a rating of 260 hp (190 kW) at sea level, so it would not appear inferior to the engines it replaced.

== Applications ==
=== During the First World War ===
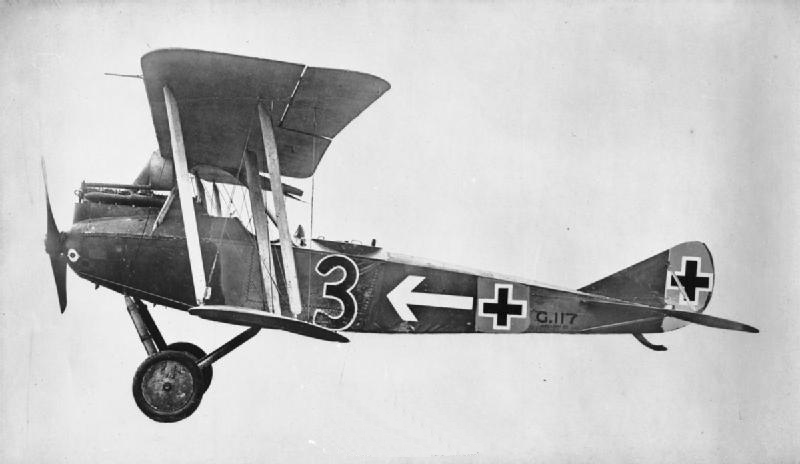
Rumpler C.VII

- Friedrichshafen G.V (one built)
- Gotha G.VIII (one built)
- Gotha G.IX
- Gotha WD.8
- Hansa-Brandenburg W.29
- LFG Roland G.I
- Rumpler C.VII
- Sablatnig C.III
- Zeppelin airships, beginning with LZ 105 up to LZ 114
- Zeppelin-Lindau Rs.III
- Zeppelin-Lindau Rs.IV
- Zeppelin-Staaken R.VI
- Zeppelin-Staaken R.XIV
- Zeppelin-Staaken R.XV

=== After the First World War ===
- Aero A.10
- Albatros L 58
- Heinkel HE 1
- FVM S 21
- Kawanishi K-7 Transport Seaplane
- Fizir F1V-Maybach
- Sablatnig P.III

== Other Maybach engines ==
The earlier Maybach engines were:

- Maybach AZ of 1909: 140 hp (100 kW)
- Maybach CX of 1915: 210 hp (160 kW)
- Maybach DW and IR of 1914: 160 hp (120 kW)
- Maybach HS (there was a variant HSLu, known also as HS-Lu) of 1915: 240 hp (180 kW)
- Maybach Mb III - a new designation for the existing Maybach IR engine
- Maybach Mb IV - a new designation for the existing Maybach HS engine

The power ratings for these older engines are at sea level, unlike the rating of the Mb IVa.

== Specifications (Mb.IVa) ==
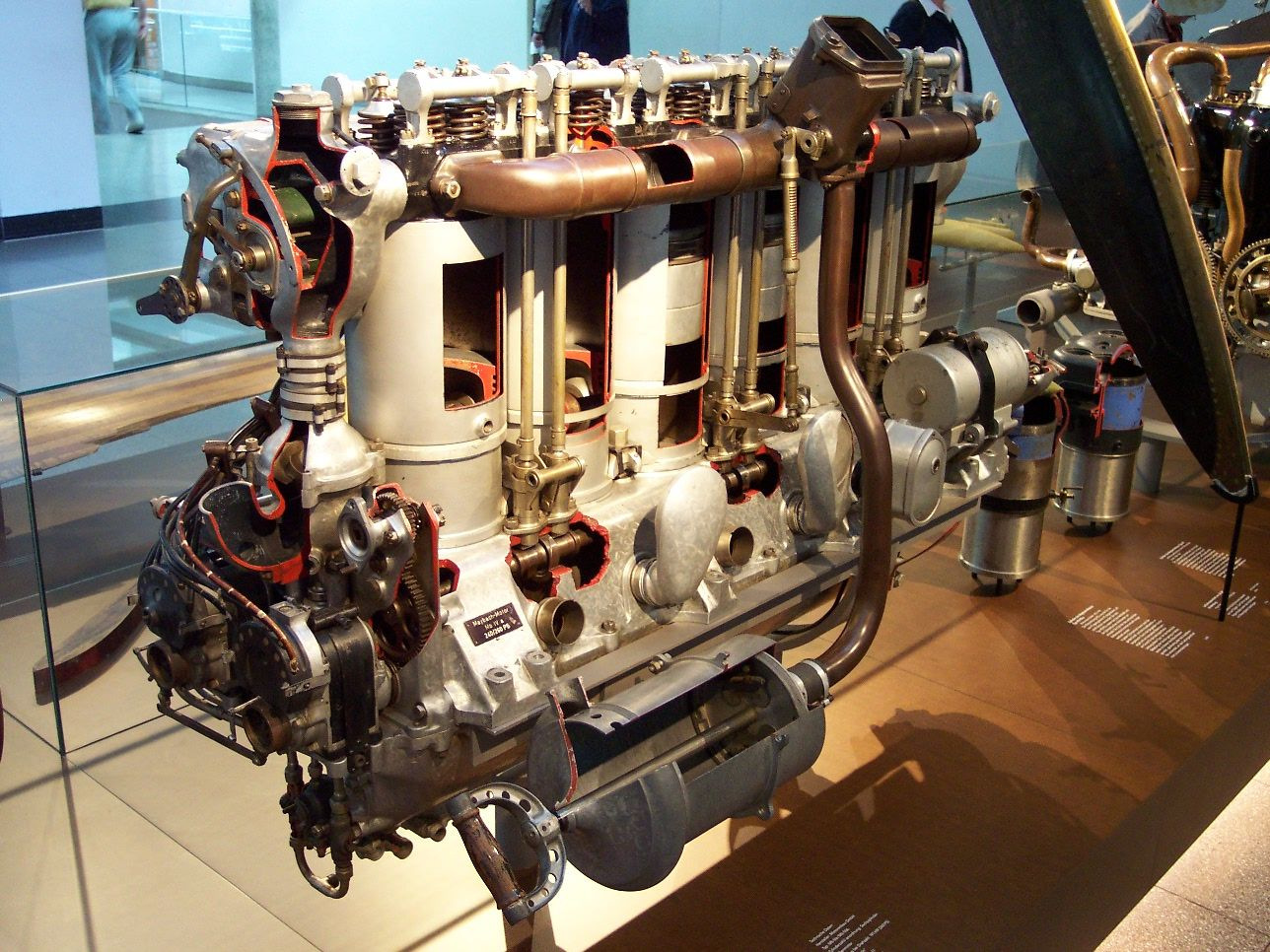
Mb IVa at the Zeppelin Museum Friedrichshafen

Data from Kleinheins.

=== General characteristics ===
- Type: 6-cylinder inline liquid-cooled aircraft engine
- Bore: 165 mm (6.6 in)
- Stroke: 180 mm (7.2 in)
- Displacement: 23.096 l
- Dry weight: 400 kg (881 lb) (later variant with aluminium pistons 390 kg (859 lb))
- Designer: Karl Maybach

=== Components ===
- Cooling system: water-cooled

=== Performance ===
- Power output: 245 hp
- Compression ratio: 6.08:1
- Specific fuel consumption: 200g/PS/h

== See also ==
- Zeppelin

Related lists

- List of aircraft engines
