= Aichi E11A =

1937 flying boat design by Aichi

E11A Type 98 Reconnaissance Seaplane
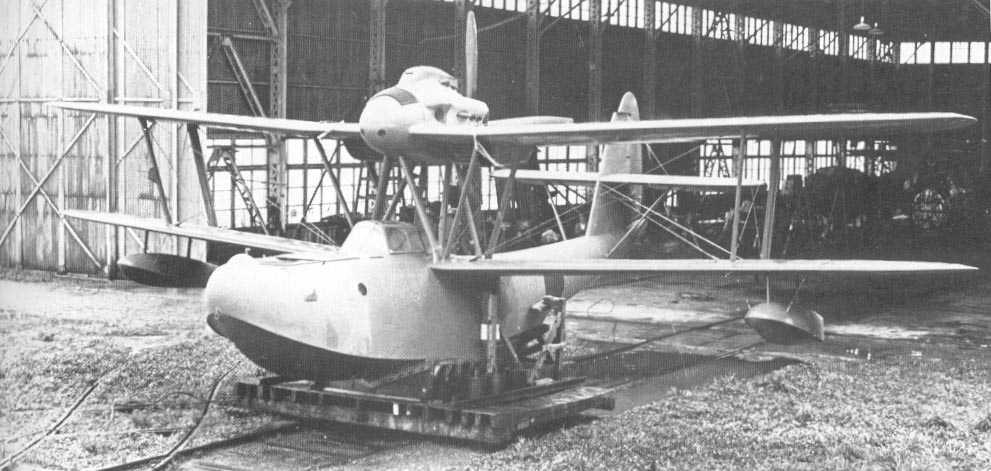

General information
- Type: Gunnery Spotting
- Manufacturer: Aichi Kokuki
- Status: retired
- Primary user: Imperial Japanese Navy Air Service
- Number built: 17

History
- First flight: June 1937

The Aichi E11A (九八夜偵, Kyū-hachi Yatei) was an Imperial Japanese Navy flying boat used during the first year of World War II for maritime patrol duties. The Allied reporting name for this type was "Laura"; the Japanese Navy designation was "Type 98 Reconnaissance Seaplane". The Type 98 was quite similar to the earlier E10A Type 96, whose allied name was "Hank". "Lauras" were rare - only 17 were built. It was designed to be launched from cruisers or battleships in order to spot their shellfire at night. The Type 98s were soon diverted to communications and transport duties.

== Variants ==
- E11A1 : Night reconnaissance flying boat for the Imperial Japanese Navy. Production version.

== Specifications (Aichi E11A1) ==
Data from Warplanes of the Second World War, Volume Five: Flying Boats

General characteristics

- Crew: 3
- Length: 10.71 m (35 ft 2 in)
- Wingspan: 14.49 m (47 ft 6 in)
- Height: 4.52 m (14 ft 10 in)
- Empty weight: 1,927 kg (4,248 lb)
- Gross weight: 3,297 kg (7,269 lb)
- Max takeoff weight: 3,297 kg (7,269 lb)
- Powerplant: 1 × Hiro Type 91 Model 22 W-12 water-cooled piston engine, 460 kW (620 hp)
- Propellers: 4-bladed fixed-pitch pusher propeller

Performance

- Maximum speed: 217 km/h (135 mph, 117 kn) at 2,400 m (7,900 ft)
- Range: 1,945 km (1,209 mi, 1,050 nmi)
- Service ceiling: 4,425 m (14,500 ft)

Armament

- Guns: 1 × 7.7 mm (.303 in) Type 92 machine gun

== See also ==
Aircraft of comparable role, configuration, and era

- Aichi E10A Type 96

Related lists

- List of aircraft of World War II
- List of military aircraft of Japan
