= List of aircraft (K) =

This is a list of aircraft in alphabetical order by manufacturer beginning with K.

== K ==
=== K & S ===
(Kate & Stan McLeod)

- K & S Jungster I
- K & S Jungster II
- K & S SA 102 Point 5 Cavalier

=== K & W ===
see: EKW

=== Kaddy ===
(Douglas Kaddy, West Groton, CT)

- Kaddy 1934 Monoplane

=== Kadiak ===
(Everett E David, Detroit, MI)

- Kadiak KC-1 Speedster

=== Kaess ===
(Kaess Aircraft Engr Co, NJ)

- Kaess CL-1

=== Teruo Kago ===
(Teruo Kago)

- Teruo Kago TK-1

=== KAI ===
(Kazan Aviation Institute)

- KAI-1
- KAI-2
- KAI-3/UPB
- KAI-13
- KAI-15
- KAI-16

=== KAI ===
Korea Aerospace Industries Ltd. (commonly referred to as KAI, Korean: 한국항공우주산업, Hanja: 韓國航空宇宙産業)

- KAI KT-1 Woongbi
- KAI KC-100 Naraon
- KAI T-50 Golden Eagle
- KAI KF-21 Boramae
- KAI KUH-1 Surion

=== Kairys ===
(Jurgis Kairys)

- Kairys JUKA

=== Kaiser ===
(Daniel (or Donald?) Kaiser, Chicago, IL)

- Kaiser 1912 Triplane

=== Kaiser ===
(Daniel Kaiser, Milwaukee, WI) (May be Kiser)

- Kaiser Airliner

=== Kaiser-Fleetwings ===
- Kaiser-Fleetwings A-39
- Kaiser-Fleetwings BQ-2
- Kaiser-Fleetwings BTK

=== Kaiser-Hammond ===
(Kaiser-Stearman Aircraft Co, Oakland, CA)

- Kaiser-Hammond Y-2 Aircar

=== Kalec ===
()

- Kalec 1928 Biplane

=== Kalgoorlie ===
- Kalgoorlie Biplane

=== Kalinauskas, Rolandas ===
(Rolandas Kalinauskas, Prienai, Lithuania)

- Rolandas Kalinauskas RK-1 Swallow
- Rolandas Kalinauskas RK-2 Lightning
- Rolandas Kalinauskas RK-3 Wind
- Rolandas Kalinauskas RK-4 Minija
- Rolandas Kalinauskas RK-5 Ruth
- Rolandas Kalinauskas RK-6 Magic
- Rolandas Kalinauskas RK-7 Orange
- Rolandas Kalinauskas RK-8
- Rolandas Kalinauskas RK-9 Palanga

=== Kalinin OKB ===
- Aleksandrov-Kalinin AK-1
- Kalinin K-2
- Kalinin K-3
- Kalinin K-4
- Kalinin K-5
- Kalinin K-6
- Kalinin K-7
- Kalinin K-9
- Kalinin K-10
- Kalinin K-11
- Kalinin K-12
- Kalinin K-13
- Kalinin K-14
- Kalinin K-15
- Kalinin A-2

=== Kalkert ===
(Albert Kalkert / Ramor Flugzeugbau)

- Kalkert KE.5
- Kalkert KE.7
- Kalkert KE.8
- Kalkert KE.9
- Kalkert KE.14
- Kalkert Ka 430 (assault glider)

=== Kam-Craft ===
- Kam-Craft Kamvair-2

=== Kaman ===
((Charles H) Kaman Aircraft Corp, Bradley Field, Windsor Locks, CT 1953: Bloomfield, CT 1967: Kaman Corp. 1969: Kaman Aerospace division.)

- Kaman H-2 Seasprite
- Kaman H-22
- Kaman H-43 Huskie
- Kaman HOK
- Kaman HTK Huskie
- Kaman HUK Huskie
- Kaman HU2K Seasprite
- Kaman K-16B
- Kaman K-17
- Kaman K-125
- Kaman K-190
- Kaman K-225
- Kaman K-240
- Kaman K-600
- Kaman K-894
- Kaman K-1125, sometimes called Huskie III
- Kaman K-1200
- Kaman K-MAX
- Kaman KSA-100 SAVER

=== Kamerton-N ===
- Kamerton-N Ratnik

=== Kaminskas ===
(Rim (or Ray) Kaminskas, Chino, CA)

- Kaminskas Jungster I
- Kaminskas Jungster II
- Kaminskas Jungster III

=== Kamov ===
- KaSkr-1
- KaSkr-2
- Kamov AK
- Kamov Ka-8
- Kamov Ka-10 "Hat"
- Kamov Ka-15 "Hen"
- Kamov Ka-18 "Hog"
- Kamov Ka-20 "Harp"
- Kamov Ka-22 Vintokryl "Hoop"
- Kamov Ka-25 "Hormone"
- Kamov Ka-26 "Hoodlum-A"
- Kamov Ka-27 "Helix-A"
- Kamov Ka-28 "Helix"
- Kamov Ka-29 "Helix-B"
- Kamov Ka-31 "Helix-E"
- Kamov Ka-32 "Helix-C" and "Helix-D"
- Kamov Ka-37
- Kamov Ka-50 "Hokum-A"
- Kamov Ka-52 "Hokum-B"
- Kamov Ka-56
- Kamov Ka-60
- Kamov Ka-62
- Kamov Ka-90
- Kamov Ka-92
- Kamov Ka-115
- Kamov Ka-126 "Hoodlum-B"
- Kamov Ka-128
- Kamov Ka-136
- Kamov Ka-137
- Kamov Ka-226 "Hoodlum-C"
- Kamov V-50
- Kamov V-60
- Kamov V-80
- Kamov V-100

=== Kansas City ===
(Kansas City Aircraft Co (pres: George or Gordon L Bennett), Richards Field, Kansas City, MO)

- Kansas City A
- Kansas City Cabin

=== Kanter-Moissant ===
- Kanter-Moissant monoplane

=== Kapferer ===
(Henry Kapferer)

- Kapferer Paulhan n°3

=== Kappa 77 ===
- Kappa 77 KP 2U-SOVA

=== Kaproni Bulgarski ===
(Caproni Bulgara SA / Samoletna Fabrika Kaproni Bulgarski)

- Kaproni Bulgarski KB-1 Papillon (Papillon - Butterfly) - (Ca.100)
- Kaproni Bulgarski KB-2A Tchuchuliga (Tchuchuliga - Lark) - (Ca.113)
- Kaproni Bulgarski KB-2UT (Ca.113)
- Kaproni Bulgarski KB-3 Tchuchuliga I (Tchuchuliga I - Lark I) - (Ca.113)
- Kaproni Bulgarski KB-4 Tchuchuliga II (Tchuchuliga II - Lark II) - (Ca.113)
- Kaproni Bulgarski KB-5 Tchuchuliga III (Tchuchuliga III - Lark III) - (Ca.113)
- Kaproni Bulgarski KB-6 Papagal (Papagal -Parrot) - (Ca.309 Ghibli)
- Kaproni Bulgarski KB-11 Fazan (Fazan -Pheasant)
- Kaproni Bulgarski KB-311 Kvazimodo (Ca.311)

=== Karhumäki ===
(Veljekset Karhumäki O/Y / Karhumäen veljekset)

- Karhumäki Karhu 1 Bear 1
- Karhumäki Karhu 2 Bear 2
- Karhumäki Karhu 3 Bear 3
- Karhumäki Tiira Tern
- Karhumäki Karhu 48B
- Karhumäki ViriMis-pronunciation or misspelling??

=== Kari-Keen ===
(Kari-Keen Aircraft Inc (founders: Ernest A Arndt, Swen Swanson, W W Wilson, one other unnamed), 509-511 Plymouth St, Sioux City, IA)

- Kari-Keen 60 Sioux coupe
- Kari-Keen 90 Sioux coupe

=== Karp ===
(Larry Karp, Deer Park, NY)

- Karp Canary hawk

=== Kasyaněnko ===
(Kasyaněnko / Kievskogo Politiechnicheskogo Instituta - KPI)

- Kasyaněnko KPI-5 a.k.a. No.5

=== Kauffman ===
(K K Kauffman, Pittsburgh, PA)

- Kauffman A-1

=== Kaufmann ===
(Charles H Kaufmann, 49 Poinier St, Newark, NJ)

- Kaufmann A

=== Kaufmann ===
(Paul Kaufmann)

- Kaufmann n°1

=== Kawanishi ===
(Kawanishi Kokuki kk - Kawanishi Aircraft Company Ltd.)

- Kawanishi Baika
- Kawanishi F
- Kawanishi G
- Kawanishi K-1
- Kawanishi K-2
- Kawanishi K-3
- Kawanishi K-5
- Kawanishi K-6
- Kawanishi K-7
- Kawanishi K-8
- Kawanishi K-9
- Kawanishi K-10
- Kawanishi K-11
- Kawanishi K-12 Sakura
- Kawanishi K-200
- Kawanishi P
- Kawanishi S
- Kawanishi T
- Kawanishi E5K
- Kawanishi E7K
- Kawanishi E8K
- Kawanishi E10K
- Kawanishi E11K
- Kawanishi E12K
- Kawanishi E13K
- Kawanishi E15K Shiun
- Kawanishi F1K
- Kawanishi G9K
- Kawanishi H3K
- Kawanishi H6K
- Kawanishi H8K
- Kawanishi H11K
- Kawanishi J3K
- Kawanishi J6K
- Kawanishi K6K
- Kawanishi K8K<
- Kawanishi N1K Kyofu, Kyohuu, Shiden, and Shiden-Kai; "Rex"
- Kawanishi Navy Experimental 7-shi Reconnaissance Seaplane
- Kawanishi Navy Experimental 8-shi Reconnaissance Seaplane
- Kawanishi Navy Experimental 9-shi Flying Boat
- Kawanishi Navy Experimental 9-shi Night Reconnaissance Seaplane
- Kawanishi Navy Experimental 9-shi Transport Seaplane
- Kawanishi Navy Experimental 10-Shi Observation Seaplane
- Kawanishi Navy Experimental 11-Shi Advanced Trainer Seaplane
- Kawanishi Navy Experimental 11-shi Night Reconnaissance Seaplane
- Kawanishi Navy Experimental 11-shi Transport Seaplane
- Kawanishi Navy Experimental 12-Shi Two-seat Reconnaissance Seaplane
- Kawanishi Navy Experimental 12-Shi Three-seat Reconnaissance Seaplane
- Kawanishi Navy Experimental 14-Shi Two-seat Reconnaissance Seaplane Shiun
- Kawanishi Navy Experimental 15-Shi Fighter Seaplane Kyohuu
- Kawanishi Navy Experimental 17-Shi Attack Bomber
- Kawanishi Navy Experimental 17-Shi Otsu (B) Type Interceptor Fighter
- Kawanishi Navy Experimental 18-Shi Otsu (B) Type Interceptor Fighter Jinpuu
- Kawanishi Navy Experimental Large-size Transport Flying-Boat Soukuu
- Kawanishi Navy Fighter Seaplane Kyofu
- Kawanishi Navy Interceptor Fighter Shiden
- Kawanishi Navy Interceptor Fighter Shiden Kai
- Kawanishi Navy Training Fighter Shiden Kai Rensen
- Kawanishi Navy Transport Flying Boat Seikuu
- Kawanishi Navy Type 90-2 Flying Boat
- Kawanishi Navy Type 90-3 Reconnaissance Seaplane
- Kawanishi Navy Type 94 Reconnaissance Seaplane
- Kawanishi Navy Type 94 Transport
- Kawanishi Navy Type 96 Transport Flying Boat
- Kawanishi Navy Type 97 Flying Boat
- Kawanishi Navy Type 97 Transport Flying Boat
- Kawanishi Navy Type 0 Primary Trainer Seaplane
- Kawanishi Navy Type 2 Flying Boat
- Kawanishi Navy Type 2 High-Speed Reconnaissance Seaplane

=== Kawasaki ===
(Kawasaki Kokuki Kogyo Kabushiki Kaisha - Kawasaki Aircraft Engineering Company Limited)

- Kawasaki A-6
- Kawasaki C-1
- Kawasaki C-2
- Kawasaki C-5
- Kawasaki Ka 87
- Kawasaki KAL-1
- Kawasaki KAL-2
- Kawasaki KAT-1
- Kawasaki KDA-2
- Kawasaki KDA-3
- Kawasaki KDA-5
- Kawasaki KDA-6
- Kawasaki KDC-2
- Kawasaki KDC-5
- Kawasaki KH-4
- Kawasaki KH-7
- Kawasaki-Vertol KV-107-II
- Kawasaki Igo-1-A
- Kawasaki Igo-1-B
- Kawasaki-Salmson 2-A.-2
- Kawasaki-Dornier Do N
- Kawasaki-Dornier Komet Transport
- Kawasaki-Dornier Merkur Transport
- Kawasaki-Dornier Wal Transport Flying-boat
- Kawasaki Experimental KDA-6 Reconnaissance Aircraft
- Kawasaki Experimental KDC-2 Transport
- Kawasaki Experimental Giyu No.3 Flying-boat
- Kawasaki Experimental Carrier Reconnaissance Aircraft
- Kawasaki OH-1
- Kawasaki P-1
- Kawasaki P-2J
- Kawasaki T-4
- Kawasaki-Vertol 107-II
- Kawasaki YPX
- Kawasaki Ki-3
- Kawasaki Ki-5
- Kawasaki Ki-10
- Kawasaki Ki-22
- Kawasaki Ki-28
- Kawasaki Ki-32
- Kawasaki Ki-38
- Kawasaki Ki-45 Toryu
- Kawasaki Ki-48
- Kawasaki Ki-56
- Kawasaki Ki-60
- Kawasaki Ki-61 Hien
- Kawasaki Ki-64
- Kawasaki Ki-66
- Kawasaki Ki-78
- Kawasaki Ki-81
- Kawasaki Ki-85
- Kawasaki Ki-88
- Kawasaki Ki-89
- Kawasaki Ki-91
- Kawasaki Ki-96
- Kawasaki Ki-100
- Kawasaki Ki-102
- Kawasaki Ki-108
- Kawasaki Ki-119
- Kawasaki Ki-147 I-Go Type1 – Ko
- Kawasaki Ki-148
- Kawasaki Ki-174
- Kawasaki Army Experimental Multi-Seat Convoy Fighter
- Kawasaki Army Experimental KDA-3 Fighter
- Kawasaki Army Type Otsu 1 Reconnaissance Aircraft
- Kawasaki Army Type 87 Night Bomber (1927)
- Kawasaki Army Type 88 Reconnaissance Aircraft (1928)
- Kawasaki Army Type 88 Light Bomber (1928)
- Kawasaki Army Type 92 Model 1 Fighter (1932)
- Kawasaki Army Type 92 Model 2 Fighter
- Kawasaki Army Type 93-1 Single-engined Light Bomber (1933)
- Kawasaki Army Type 95 Fighter (1935)
- Kawasaki Army Type 98 Single-engine Light Bomber (1938)
- Kawasaki Army Type 99 Twin-engined Light Bomber (1939)
- Kawasaki Army Type 1 Freight Transport (1941)
- Kawasaki Army Type 2 Two-seat Fighter (1942)
- Kawasaki Army Type 3 Fighter (1943)
- Kawasaki Army Type 4 Assault Aircraft (1944)
- Kawasaki Army Type 4 Night Fighter
- Kawasaki Army Type 4 Two-seat Fighter
- Kawasaki Army Type 5 Fighter (1945)

=== Kay ===
(Kay Gyroplanes Ltd.)

- Kay Gyroplane 32/1
- Kay Gyroplane 33/1

=== Kayaba Industry ===
- Kayaba Heliplane
- Kayaba Ka-Go
- Kayaba Ka-1
- Kayaba Ka-2
- Kayaba Ku-2
- Kayaba Ku-3
- Kayaba Ku-4
- Kimura HK-1

=== Kazan ===
- Kazan Ansat

=== Kazyanenko ===
(Yevgeny, Ivan and Andrei Kazyanenko)

- Kazyanenko No.5

=== KB SAT ===
(Sovremyenne Aviatsyonne Tekhnologii - Modern Aircraft Technologies)

- KB SAT SR-10

=== KEA ===
(Greek: Κρατικό Εργοστάσιο Αεροπλάνων - State Aircraft Factory)

- KEA Chelidon

=== Keane ===
((Horace) Keane Aeroplanes, North Beach, Long Island NY. c.1921: Acquired rights to ACE (Aircraft Engr Co, NY). c.1925: Keane Aircraft Corp, Keyport NJ. )

- Keane Ace
- Keane HKL-27

=== Keen ===
(Charles F Keen, Madison, WI)

- Keen Special

=== Kegel ===
(Kegel-Flugzeugbau - Kassel / Max Kegel and Fritz Ackermann using the AK logo)

- Kegel Zögling

=== Keitek ===
(Keitek srl, Remanzacco, Italy)

- Keitek Streamer

=== Keleher ===
(James Keleher, Fremont, CA)

- Keleher Lark

=== Keller ===
(Henry S "Pop" Keller, Chicago, IL)

- Keller 1911 Octoplane
- Keller 1925 Monoplane

=== Keller ===
(Fred Keller, Anchorage, AK)

- Keller Prospector STOL

=== Kellett ===
((W Wallace & Roderick G) Kellett Autogiro Corporation, Philadelphia, PA)

- Kellett K-1X
- Kellett K-2
- Kellett K-3
- Kellett K-4
- Kellett KD-1
- Kellett KD-10
- Kellett KH-2
- Kellett KH-15
- Kellett G-1
- Kellett H-8
- Kellett H-10
- Kellett H-17
- Kellett O-60
- Kellett R-2
- Kellett R-3
- Kellett R-8
- Kellett R-10

=== Kellis ===
- Kellis Air-Truck

=== Kellner-Béchereau ===
(Avions Kellner-Béchereau)

- Kellner-Béchereau 23
- Kellner-Béchereau 28VD
- Kellner-Béchereau 29
- Kellner-Béchereau 30
- Kellner-Béchereau E.1
- Kellner-Béchereau E.4
- Kellner-Béchereau EC.4
- Kellner-Béchereau ED.5
- Kellner-Béchereau E.5
- Kellner-Béchereau E.60

=== Kellogg ===
(Harold W Kellogg, Ontario, CA)

- Kellogg Monoplane

=== Kelly ===
(John Henry Kelly, El Dorado, AR)

- Kelly 1930 Monoplane

=== Kelly ===
(Dudley R Kelly, Versailles, KY)

- Kelly-D

=== Kelly ===
(Kevin Kelly )

- Kelly Barbara Jean II

=== KFC ===
(Kelowna Flightcraft Centre)

- KFC Stretch 580

=== Kember ===
(Scott Kember, Sacramento, CA)

- Kember Nazgul

=== Kendall ===
(George C Distel & Ralph A Kendall, Le Sueur, MN)

- Kendall Crescent A

=== Kendall ===
(Dr. Ridley Kendall)

- Kendall Mayfly

=== Kennedy ===
(Kennedy Aeroplanes Limited)

- Kennedy Giant

=== Kensgaila ===
(Kensgaila Aircraft Enterprize / Vladas Kensgaila)

- Kensgaila VK-1 Erelis
- Kensgaila VK-2
- Kensgaila K-20 (VK-3)
- Kensgaila VK-3
- Kensgaila VK-4 Žuvėdra
- Kensgaila VK-5
- Kensgaila VK-6
- Kensgaila VK-7
- Kensgaila VK-8 Ausra
- Kensgaila VK-9
- Kensgaila Arus?

=== Kensinger ===
(Ned Kensinger, Fort Worth, TX)

- Kensinger KF (a.k.a. Special)
- Kensinger Tater Chip

=== Kentucky ===
(Kentucky Aircraft Co, Owensboro, KY)

- Kentucky Aircraft Cardinal

=== Kenyon ===
(Harold & Kenneth Kenyon, Warren, OH)

- Kenyon A

=== Kerestesi ===
(Charles A Kerestesi, Elgin, IL)

- Kerestesi G-1

=== Kerrison ===
(Dr Davenport Kerrison, Jacksonville, FL)

- Kerrison 1909 Biplane

=== Kersey-Hudgins-Kennedy ===
(C C Kersey, James Hudgins, Virgil Kennedy, Ft Worth, TX)

- Kersey-Hudgins-Kennedy 1934 Monoplane

=== Kestrel ===
(Kestrel Aircraft Co (fdr: Donald L Stroud), Norman, OK)

- Kestrel KL-1
- Kestrel K250

=== Kestrel Aircraft Company ===
- Kestrel K-350

=== Ketner ===
(Ketner Air Coach Co )

- Ketner Air Coach

=== Keystone ===
See also: Huff-Daland

- Keystone B-3
- Keystone B-4
- Keystone B-5
- Keystone B-6
- Keystone LB-1
- Keystone LB-3
- Keystone LB-5
- Keystone LB-6
- Keystone LB-7
- Keystone LB-8
- Keystone LB-9
- Keystone LB-10
- Keystone LB-11
- Keystone LB-12
- Keystone LB-13
- Keystone LB-14
- Keystone NK Pup
- Keystone-Loening O-10
- Keystone O-15
- Keystone OK
- Keystone OL
- Keystone-Loening OL
- Keystone PK
- Keystone K-84 Commuter
- Keystone Puffer
- Keystone K-47 Pathfinder
- Keystone K-55 Pronto
- Keystone Pronto
- Keystone K-78 Patrician
- Keystone-Loening K-84 Commuter
- Keystone-Loening K-85 Air Yacht

=== KhAI ===
(Kharkovskii Aviatsionny Institut - Kharkov Aviation Institute, a.k.a. Kharkivskii Aviatsionny Institut - Kharkiv Aviation Institute)

- Kharkiv KhAI Omega
- Kharkiv KhAI-1
- Kharkiv KhAI-2 (powered sailplane)
- Kharkiv KhAI-3 (Aviavnito-3) (Sergei Kirov)
- Kharkiv KhAI-4 (Iskra)
- Kharkiv KhAI-5 (Neman R-10)
- Kharkiv KhAI-6
- Kharkiv KhAI-8
- Kharkiv KhAI-12 (Start)
- Kharkiv KhAI-17
- Kharkiv KhAI-18
- Kharkiv KhAI-19
- Kharkiv KhAI-20
- Kharkiv KhAI-22
- Kharkiv KhAI-24
- Kharkiv KhAI-25
- Kharkiv KhAI-26
- Kharkiv KhAI-27
- Kharkiv KhAI-28
- Kharkiv KhAI-29
- Kharkiv KhAI-30 (Professor Nyeman)
- Kharkiv KhAI-32
- Kharkiv KhAI-33
- Kharkiv KhAI-35 (Entuziast)
- Kharkiv KhAI-36
- Kharkiv KhAI-51
- Kharkiv KhAI-52
- Aviavnito-2 (Blohka)
- Aviavnito-8
- Aviavnito-9
- PS-5
- 60-let KhAI

=== KJ ===
- KJ-1 AEWC
- KJ-200
- KJ-2000
- KJ-3000

=== Kharkiv Aviation Factory ===
(KhAZ - Kharkov Aviatsionny Zavod - Kharkov State Aviation Plant)

- KkAZ ViS-3
- KkAZ ViS-5
- Kharkiv KhAZ-30
- KkAZ ХАЗ-30

=== Khioni ===
(Vassili Nikolayevich Khioni)

- Khioni VKh Anadva
- Khioni VKh Anasalya
- Khioni No.4
- Khioni No.5

=== KHP ===
(Kazan Helicopters Plant, Kazan, Tatarstan)

- KHP Aktai
- KHP Ansat

=== Kidd ===
(T L Kidd, San Antonio, TX)

- Kidd Adventurer

=== Kieger ===
(André Kieger)

- Kieger AK.01
- Kieger AK.3

=== Kiel ===
(Flugzeugbau Kiel G.m.b.H.)

- Kiel FK 166

=== Killingsworth ===
(Richard Killingsworth, Ft Walton Beach, FL)

- Killingsworth DSK-1 Hawk

=== Kimball ===
(Kevin Kimball)

- Kimball McCullocoupe

=== Kimball ===
((Wilbur R) Kimball Aircraft Corp, Naugatuck, CT)

- Kimball 1908 Helicopter
- Kimball 1910 Ornithopter
- Kimball Beetle
- Kimball Tailless

=== Kimbell ===
(Gene Kimbell, Dimmitt, TX)

- Kimbell 1935 Monoplane

=== Kimberley ===
(Gareth J. Kimberley)

- Kimberley Sky-Rider

=== Kimbrel ===
(Michael J. Kimbrel)

- Kimbrel Dormoy Bathtub Mk.1
- Kimbrel Sorrell SNS-2 Guppy

=== Kimfly ===
(Kimfly D.O.O., Vodice, Slovenia)

- Kimfly Alpin
- Kimfly Light Wing M24
- Kimfly Mini Wing Q
- Kimfly River

=== Kinetic ===
(Kinetic Aviation)

- Kinetic Mountain Goat

=== King's ===
(King's Engineering Fellowship and Angel Aircraft Corp, Orange City IA. )

- King's Angel 44

=== Kingsford-Smith ===
(Kingsford Smith Aviation Services Pty. Ltd.)

- Kingsford Smith PL.7
- Kingsford Smith KS-3 Cropmaster
- Kingsford Smith Bushmaster
- Kingsford Smith Kingsmith

=== Kinman ===
(Duane Kinman, Rubidoux, CA)

- Kinman Super Simple I

=== Kinner ===
(Kinner Airplane & Motor Corporation)

- Kinner Airster
- Kinner Airster Monoplane
- Kinner Argonaut
- Kinner Playboy
- Kinner Sportster
- Kinner Sportwing
- Kinner Coupe
- Kinner Courier
- Kinner KE-8
- Kinner Monoplane
- Kinner C-7 Envoy
- Kinner CG-14 Invader
- Kinner RK Envoy
- Kinner LXK
- Kinner Navy Experimental Type K Transport

=== Kinney ===
(Cleveland, OH)

- Kinney HRH

=== Kippers ===
(Harold M Kippers, Mukwonago, WI)

- Kippers K-1 Land Monoplane

=== Kirk ===
(Joe Kirk )

- Kirk Skat

=== Kirkham ===
(Kirkham Aeroplane & Motor Co, Bath, NY)

- Kirkham 1911 Biplane
- Kirkham Air yacht
- Kirkham Racer
- Kirkham Gull

=== Kirkham-Williams ===
((Charles B) Kirkham and (Alford) Williams, Long Island, NY)

- Kirkham-Williams X
- Kirkham-Williams Mercury I

=== Kirsten ===
(Prof Frederick K Kirsten, University of WA)

- Kirsten 1934 Cycloidal Flying machine

=== Kitchen-Lee-Richards ===
see:Lee-Richards

=== Kistler ===
(James Kistler )

- Kistler Skeeter (a.k.a. Scholl F-1)
- Kistler Teenie Too (Skeeter reg!!)

=== Kjeller ===
(Kjeller Flyvemaskinsfabrik)

- Kjeller F.F.6
- Kjeller F.F.7 Hauk (Hannover CL.V)
- Kjeller F.F.8 Make I
- Kjeller F.F.8 Make II
- Kjeller F.F.8 Make III
- Kjeller F.F.9 Kaje I
- Kjeller F.F.9 Kaje II
- Kjeller F.F.9 Kaje III
- Kjeller PK X-1
- Kjeller PK X-2
- Kjeller T.2

=== Kjolseth ===
(Lt. Col. Paul Kjolseth RNoAF)

- Kjolseth PKX-1
- Kjolseth PKX-2 refer to no:Kjeller PK X-2

=== Klampher ===
(G F Klampher, Wichita, KS)

- Klampher 1930 Monoplane

=== Klassen ===
(San Francisco, CA)

- Klassen 1910 Gyroplane

=== Klein ===
(Štefan Klein)

- Klein Aeromobil

=== Klemm ===
(Leichtflugzeugbau Klemm GmbH)

- Klemm L.17w
- Klemm L.20
- Klemm L.25
- Klemm Kl 25
- Klemm Kl 26
- Klemm Kl 31
- Klemm Kl 32
- Klemm L 33
- Klemm Kl 35
- Klemm Kl 36
- Klemm Kl 105
- Klemm Kl 106
- Klemm Kl 107
- Klemm Kl 151
- Klemm Kl 152 unbuilt fighter project, number reused by Focke-Wulf
- Klemm Doppel-Kl 25
- Klemm Alpha

=== Kline ===
(Warren Kline, Miami, FL)

- Kline Red Bird

=== Klinedorf ===
(Karl D Klinedorf, Gary, IN)

- Klinedorf 1936 Monoplane

=== KLM ===
- KLM&TU Flying V

=== Knabenshue ===
(Roy Knabenshue, Los Angeles, CA)

- Knabenshue 1910 Biplane

=== Knapp ===
(Frank Knapp, Palmer, AK)

- Knapp Lil cub
- Knapp Cub X

=== Knepper ===
((Paul H) Knepper Aircraft, Lehighton, PA)

- Knepper KA-1 Crusader
- Knepper KAC-4 Crusader
- Knepper KAC-5 Crusader

=== Knight Twister ===
(Vernon W Payne, Cicero, IL)

- Knight Twister 1934 prototype
- Knight Twister Junior 75-85
- Knight Twister KT
- Knight Twister KT-50
- Knight Twister KT-75
- Knight Twister KT-80
- Knight Twister KT-90
- Knight Twister KT-95
- Knight Twister Kay-Tee Pursuit
- Knight Twister KT-125
- Knight Twister KTD-2
- Knight Twister KTS-1
- Knight Twister KTT-90
- Knight Twister MC-7
- Knight Twister SKT-1 Sunday Knight Twister

=== Knoll ===
((Felix W A) Knoll Aircraft Company, 471 W 1st St, Wichita, KS)

- Knoll KN-1
- Knoll KN-2
- Knoll KN-3
- Knoll KN-4
- Knoll KN-5
- Knoll KN-6
- Knoll KN-22

=== Knoll ===
(Richard Knoll, Ogallala, NE)

- Knoll Z

=== Knoll-Brayton ===
((Felix W A) Knoll-(---) Brayton Aeronautical Corp, Norwich, CT)

- Knoll-Brayton 1931 Monoplane
- Knoll-Brayton Sachem

=== Knoller ===
(Professor Richard Knoller)

- Knoller B.I(Av)
- Knoller B.I(Th)
- Knoller C.I(Ph)
- Knoller C.II(Av)
- Knoller C.II(Lo)
- Knoller C.II(WKF)
- Knoller D.I
- Knoller 30.05
- Knoller 70.01
- Knoller 70.02

=== Knöpfli ===
(Leo Knöpfli)

- Knöpfli Mini-Stol

=== Knowles ===
(Gp. Capt. A.S. Knowles)

- Knowles Duet

=== Knowlton (aircraft constructor) ===
- Knowlton LSP

=== Knowlton ===
(Donald Knowlton)

- Knowlton Jodette

=== Knox ===
(E J Knox, Portland, O.)

- Knox Special 4

=== Kobe Steel ===
- Kobeseiko Te-Gō

=== Kochyerigin ===
- Kochyerigin LR
- Kochyerigin TSh-3
- Kochyerigin DI-6
- Kochyerigin SR
- Kochyerigin R-9
- Kochyerigin LBSh
- Kochyerigin Sh
- Kochyerigin Sh-2
- Kochyerigin MMSh
- Kochyerigin OPB
- Kochyerigin PS-43
- Kochyerigin Bsh-1

=== Kocjan ===
(Antoni Kocjan)

- Kocjan Orlik
- Kocjan Orlik 2 (USAAC - XTG-7)
- Kocjan Orlik 3 Olympic Orlik
- Kocjan Bąk (horse-fly)
- Kocjan Bąk II
- Kocjan Bąk II bis
- Kocjan Czajka (Lapwing)
- Kocjan Czajka II
- Kocjan Czajka III
- Kocjan Czajka bis
- Kocjan Komar (Gnat)
- Kocjan Sokół
- Kocjan Wrona (Crow)
- Kocjan Wrona bis
- Kocjan Sroka (Magpie)
- Kocjan-Grzeszczyk Mewa
- Kocjan TG-7 (Orlik 2)

=== Koechlin & Pischoff ===
- Koechlin monoplane (predecessor to Pivot-Koechlin monoplane)

=== Koehl ===
(Dr. Hermann Koehl and Ernst Von Loessl)

- Koehl KO-1

=== Koehler ===
(Harold Koehler, Akron, OH)

- Koehler Air-Roamer 4
- Koehler Racer

=== Koenig ===
(? Koenig)

- Koenig 04 Tom-Pouss

=== Kohl ===
(Stefan Kohl, Kattenes, Germany)

- Kohl Mythos

=== Koivu and Toomey ===
(Fitchburg, MA)Koivu and Toomey

- Koivu and Toomey 1930 biplane

=== Kokkola ===
(Kalevi & Seppo Kokkola)

- Kokkola Ko-3 Nousukas

=== Kokusai ===
- Kokusai Ki-59
- Kokusai Ki-76
- Kokusai Ki-86
- Kokusai Ki-105 Ohtori
- Kokusai Ku-7
- Kokusai Ku-8
- Kokusai Army Experimental Glider
- Kokusai Army Type 1 Transport
- Kokusai Army Type 3 Command Liaison Plane
- Kokusai Army Type 4 Large Transport Glider
- Kokusai Ta-Go

=== Kolb ===
((Homer) Kolb Co Inc, Phoenixville, PA)

- Kolb Laser
- Kolb Firefly
- Kolb Firestar
- Kolb Flyer
- Kolb Flyer Powered Parachute
- Kolb Flyer SS
- Kolb Kolbra
- Kolb Mark III
- Kolb Slingshot
- Kolb Ultrastar

=== New Kolb Aircraft ===
- Kolb Firefly
- Kolb Firestar
- Kolb Flyer
- Kolb Flyer Super Sport
- Kolb King Kolbra
- Kolb Kolbra
- Kolb Mark III
- Kolb Slingshot
- Kolb Ultrastar

=== Kolitilin-Nikitin ===
(Ben Kolitilin and Misha Nikitin)

- Kolitilin-Nikitin PJ-II

=== KOMTA ===
(Kommissii po Tyazheloi Aviatsii - Commission for Heavy Aviation)

- KOMTA

=== Kompol ===
(Kompol SC, Swiercze, Poland)

- Kompol Jazz

=== Kondor ===
(Kondor Flugzeugwerke G.m.b.H.)

- Kondor Taube Type H
- Kondor W 1
- Kondor W 2C
- Kondor B.I
- Kondor D.I (E 3 production)
- Kondor D 1
- Kondor D 2
- Kondor D 6
- Kondor D 7
- Kondor E 3
- Kondor E 3a
- Kondor Dreidekker

=== Konner ===
(Konner Srl)

- Konner K1

=== Konstruktionskontor Nord ===
(Konstruktionskontor Nord - Flugzeugbau Nord)

- Konstruktionskontor Nord MZF 1
- Konstruktionskontor Nord BKF 1

=== Koolhoven ===
(Sytse Frederick Willem Koolhoven; see also Armstrong-Whitworth and B.A.T.)

(manufactured at Maatschappij voor Luchtvaart 1911)

- Koolhoven Heidevogel

(Manufactured at Nationale Vliegtuig Industrie - NVI 1922-1926)

- Koolhoven F.K.29
- Koolhoven F.K.31
- Koolhoven F.K.32
- Koolhoven F.K.33
- Koolhoven F.K.34

(manufactured at N.V. Koolhoven Vliegtuigen 1926-1940)

- Koolhoven F.K.30 Toerist
- Koolhoven F.K.35 unflown
- Koolhoven F.K.36 unbuilt project
- Koolhoven F.K.37 unbuilt project
- Koolhoven F.K.39 unbuilt project
- Koolhoven F.K.40
- Koolhoven F.K.41
- Koolhoven F.K.42
- Koolhoven F.K.43
- Koolhoven F.K.44 Koolmees
- Koolhoven F.K.45
- Koolhoven F.K.46
- Koolhoven F.K.47
- Koolhoven F.K.48
- Koolhoven F.K.49
- Koolhoven F.K.50
- Koolhoven F.K.51
- Koolhoven F.K.52
- Koolhoven F.K.53 Junior
- Koolhoven F.K.54
- Koolhoven F.K.55
- Koolhoven F.K.56
- Koolhoven F.K.57
- Koolhoven F.K.58
- Koolhoven F.K.59

=== Korchagin ===
- Korchagin Yamal

=== Korean Air ===
- Korean Air Chang-Gong 91

=== Korolyev OKB ===
(Sergey P. Korolyov)

- Korolyev RP-1
- Korolyev RP-318
- Korolyev SK-3 Krasnaya Zvezda

=== Korsa ===
(Flugzeugbau Korsa - Hugo G. Schmid)

- Korsa 1
- Korsa T.2

=== Kortenbach & Rauh ===
- Kortenbach & Rauh Kora 1

=== Korvin ===
(V.L.Korvin, N.G.Mikhelson, M.M.Shishmarev - Корвин, Михельсон, Шишмарев)

- Korvin MK-1 Rybka

=== Koslowski ===
(Charles D Kozlowski, Raritan. NJ)

- Koslowski Short-T

=== Kostin-Siekerin-Taciturnov ===
(L. Kostin, L. Siekerin & V. Taciturnov)

- Kostin-Siekerin-Taciturnov Leningradets

=== Kotliński ===
(Jerzy Kotliński)

- Kotliński JK-1 Trzmiel

=== Koun ===
(Young Ho Koun, Roosevelt Field, NY)

- Kouns-Craft

=== Kovaks ===
(Joseph Kovaks)

- Kovacs K-51 Peregrino

=== Kowalke ===
(Levern P Kowalke, Wall Lake, IA)

- Kowalke

=== Kozlov ===
(Sergei G. Kozlov)

- Kozlov PS (Prozrachnyy Samlyot - transparent aircraft)
- Kozlov EI (Eksperimentalnyi Istrebitel - experimental fighter)
- Kozlov Gigant

=== Kozłowski ===
(Władysław Kozłowski)

- Kozłowski WK.1 Jutrzenka
- Kozlowski WK.3

=== Kraft ===
(Phil Kraft)

- Kraft K-1 Super Fli

=== KEA ===
(KEA: Kratiko Ergostasio Aeroplanon - State Aircraft Factory)

- KEA Chelidon

=== Kraemer ===
(L A Kraemer, Rapid City, SD)

- Kraemer LK-1 Rapid Rambler
- Kraemer LV-1

=== Kraft ===
(Phil Kraft, Oceanside, CA)

- Kraft Super Fli

=== Kramme & Zeuthen ===
(see:-Skandinavisk Aero Industri)

- SAI KZ I
- SAI KZ II
- SAI KZ III
- SAI KZ IV
- SAI KZ VII
- SAI KZ VIII
- SAI KZ X

=== Krapish ===
((Alexander Peter) Krapish Aircraft Co, Kearny, NJ & Squantum, MA)

- Krapish K-1
- Krapish K-2
- Krapish K-3
- Krapish K-4

=== Krasniye Kryl'ya ===
(Taganrog, Russia)

- Krasniye Kryl'ya Deltacraft MD-40
- Krasniye Kryl'ya Deltacraft MD-50C

=== Krauss ===
- Krauss TRS-111

=== Kreider-Reisner ===
((Ammon "Amos" H) Kreider-(Lewis E) Reisner Flying Service. 1927: Kreider-Reisner Aircraft Co, Hagerstown, MD 1929: Acquired by Fairchild Aircraft Corp.)

- Kreider-Reisner A Midget
- Kreider-Reisner C-1
- Kreider-Reisner C-2 Challenger
- Kreider-Reisner C-3 Challenger
- Kreider-Reisner C-4 Challenger
- Kreider-Reisner C-5 Challenger
- Kreider-Reisner C-6 Challenger
- Kreider-Reisner C-7 Challenger
- Kreider-Reisner C-31
- Kreider-Reisner KR-21
- Kreider-Reisner KR-31
- Kreider-Reisner KR-34
- Kreider-Reisner KR-34CA
- Kreider-Reisner KR-35
- Kreider-Reisner KR-125
- Kreider-Reisner KR-135
- Kreider-Reisner XC-31

=== Kreit-Lambrickx ===
( André Kreit & Lambrickx)

- Kreit Lambrickx KL.2

=== Kremp Yu ===
- Kremp Yu monoplane

=== Kress ===
- Kress Drachenflieger

=== Kreutzer ===
(Joseph Kreutzer Corp, 1801 S Hope St, Los Angeles, CA)

- Kreutzer K-1 Air Coach
- Kreutzer K-2 Air Coach
- Kreutzer K-3 Air Coach
- Kreutzer K-5 Air Coach
- Kreutzer T-6 Air Coach

=== Krenzer ===
(Frank Krenzer, Holcomb, NY)

- Krenzer

=== Krier-Kraft ===
(Harold Krier, Wichita, KS)

- Krier-Kraft Acromaster

=== Krist ===
(Chester J. Krist)

- Krist Cloud Cutter

=== Aksel Kristiansen ===
(Aksel Kristiansen)

- Kristiansen Norge A
- Kristiansen Norge B
- Kristiansen Norge C

=== Kronfeld ===
(Robert Kronfeld)

- Kronfeld Vienna
- Kronfeld Austria
- Kronfeld Drone Trainer
- Kronfeld Drone
- Kronfeld Monoplane
- Kronfeld Ground Trainer

=== Krüger ===
(Eric Krüger - or Krueger)

- Krüger EK.51 Welcome
- Krüger two-seater

=== Krumsiek ===
(Wilhelm Krumsiek)

- Krumsiek 1909 Aeroplan

=== Kubicek Aircraft ===
(Kubicek Aircraft spol s.r.o., Brno, Czech Republic)

- Kubicek M-2 Scout
- Kubicek M-4 Irbis
- Kubicek AV-1 Hot-air airship/balloon

=== Kucher ===
(Kucher Airplane Corp, 2206 Valentine Ave, Bronx, NY)

- Kucher Club Plane
- Kucher Red Devil Flivver

=== Kuhelj ===
(Dr. ing. Anton Kuhelj)

- Kuhelj LK-1
- Kuhelj TseTse

=== Kuhnert ===
(Sam W Kuhnert, Camp Hill, PA)

- Kuhnert Photoplane

=== Kuhlia ===
(Mikka Kuhlia)

- Kuhlia MK Ia
- Kuhlia MK Ib
- Kuhlia MK II

=== Kurzenberger ===
(Richard Kurzenberger, Horsehead, NY)

- Kurzenberger Mini-Stuka

=== Kutnar ===
(Virgil Kutnar, San Francisco, CA)

- Kutnar Rotorplane

=== KWD ===
(Kaiserlicht Werft (Danzig))

- K.W. Nos 404-405
- K.W. Nos 467-470
- K.W. Nos 1105-1106
- K.W. No. 1650

=== KWK ===
(Kaiserlicht Werft (Kiel))

- K.W. Nos 463-466

=== KWW ===
(Kaiserlicht Werft (Wilhelmshaven))

- K.W. Nos 401-403
- K.W. Nos 461-462
- K.W. No. 945
- K.W. No. 947

=== Kyushu / Watanabe ===
(Kyushu Hikoki K.K.) (some products were manufactured under the Watanabe name)

- Kyūshū K6W WS-103
- Kyūshū WS-103
- Kyushu J7W Shinden
- Kyushu K9W
- Kyushu K10W
- Kyushu K11W Shiragiku
- Kyushu Navy Experimental 14-Shi Basic Land Trainer Kouyou
- Kyushu Navy Experimental 14-Shi Intermediate Land Trainer
- Kyushu Navy Experimental 15-Shi Operational Trainer Shiragiku
- Kyushu Navy Experimental 17-Shi Patrol Bomber Tokai
- Kyushu Navy Experimental 18-Shi Otsu (B) Type Interceptor Fighter Shinden
- Kyushu Navy Experimental Jet-powered Interceptor Fighter Shinden-Kai
- Kyushu Navy Operations Trainer Shiragiku
- Kyushu Navy Patrol Plane Nankai
