= Ratnik =

Ratnik can refer to:

- Ratniks, a Bulgarian nationalist organization
- Ratnik (program), a Russian infantry combat system
- Kamerton-N Ratnik, a Russian autogyro
- Ratnik (film), a Nigerian science fiction film
- Diane Ratnik (born 1962), Canadian retired volleyball player
- Marcel Ratnik (born 2003), Slovenian footballer
