= Kondor D 7 =

D 7
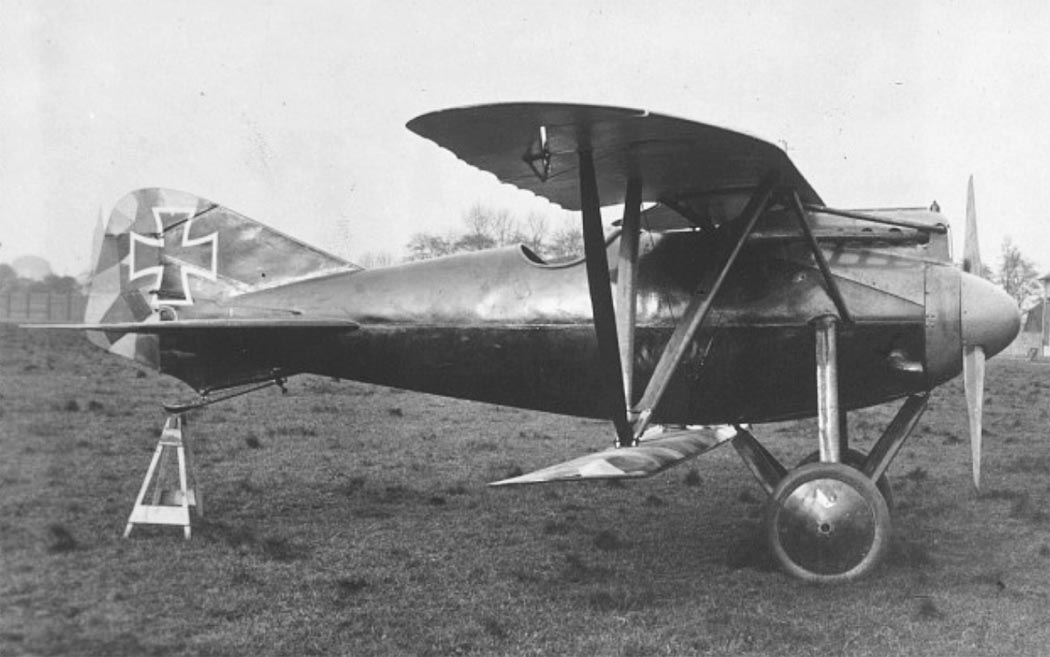

General information
- Type: Fighter aircraft
- National origin: Germany
- Manufacturer: Kondor Flugzeugwerke, Essen
- Designer: Walter Rethel
- Number built: 1

History
- First flight: before May 1918

The Kondor D 7 was a prototype German single seat biplane fighter built over the winter of 1917-18. It was not a success and its development was soon abandoned.

== Design and development ==
In the summer of 1917 Kondor followed the lead of Fokker's Dr.I July 1917 triplane with one of their own. Known only as the Kondor Dreidekker this aircraft, first flown in October 1917, was not a success; its development programme was soon abandoned because of severe vibrational problems. (Note: Very little is known about this aircraft (Green and Sweansborough p.322)) Instead, Kondor used the fuselage, empennage and lower wing of the Dreidekker to produce a biplane or sesquiplane called the D 7.

The common fuselage was a tube steel internal structure with plywood skin, rounded in cross-section. At the front the fuselage reduced smoothly in diameter to a large spinner with a two blade propeller driven by a 160 hp (120 kW) six-cylinder, liquid-cooled upright inline Mercedes D.III engine, though there are hints in the records suggesting an earlier, different engine. The upper part of the engine protruded above the fuselage, enclosed in its own cowling. At the rear the tailplane was mounted at mid-fuselage under a long chord fin with a strongly swept leading edge, carrying a deep rudder. There was a shallow ventral fin. The D 7 had a fixed conventional undercarriage, with each mainwheel's leg placed vertically and mounted at mid-fuselage, assisted by a forward leaning strut attached under the nose. A long tailskid reached rearwards from the forward edge of the ventral fin.

The wings of the D 7 had constant chord and the upper one was supported just above the fuselage on a cabane. The cockpit was aft of its trailing edge, where there was a central rounded cut-out to assist the pilot's upward and forward view. The lower wing, narrower in chord, was not directly attached to the fuselage but supported centrally by rear leaning struts from the undercarriage structure. The interplane struts were also unusual; three struts were attached at the same point on the lower wing, spreading out upwards into an inverted tripod or pair of Vs.

The date of the D 7's first flight is not known though it must have been after October 1917, when the Dreidekker was flying, and before May 1918 when a report from the Idflieg said the D 7 was about to recommence testing with the Mercedes engine. It was not entered into the second D-type (fighter) competition of June 1918, suggesting Kondor were beginning to concentrate on the monoplane designs suggested by the success of the Fokker D.VIII, a process that led to the Kondor E 3.

== Variants ==
Dreidekker
An unsuccessful triplane fighter, first flown in October 1917, which suffered from excessive vibration of the wing structure, development of which was soon abandoned.
Kondor D 7
Utilising the fuselage empennage and undercarriage of the Dreidekker, the D 7 was fitted with biplane wings. Despite flying before May 1918 the D 7 was not entered into the June Idflieg fighter competition and was not developed further.

== Specifications (D 7) ==
Data from Green and Swanborough 1994

General characteristics

- Crew: One
- Length: 6.20 m (20 ft 4 in)
- Wingspan: 8.50 m (27 ft 11 in)
- Height: 2.30 m (7 ft 7 in)
- Wing area: 15.70 m^{2} (169.0 sq ft)
- Empty weight: 590 kg (1,301 lb)
- Gross weight: 785 kg (1,731 lb)
- Powerplant: 1 × Mercedes D.III six-cylinder, liquid-cooled upright inline engine, 120 kW (160 hp)
- Propellers: 2-bladed

Performance

- Maximum speed: 180 km/h (110 mph, 97 kn)
- Endurance: 1.45 hr

== Bibliography ==
- Gray, Peter & Thetford, Owen (1987) [1970]. German Aircraft of the First World War (2nd ed.). London: Putnam. ISBN 0-85177-809-7.
- Green, William & Swanborough, Gordon (2001) [1994]. The Complete Book of Fighters: An Illustrated Encyclopedia of Every Fighter Built and Flown (Revised and Updated ed.). London: Salamander Books. ISBN 1-84065-269-1.
- Herris, Jack (2020). German Aircraft of Minor Manufacturers in WWI: A Centennial Perspective on Great War Airplanes. Gret War Aviation Centennial Series (49). Vol. 1: Alter to Korn. n.p.: Aeronaut Books. ISBN 978-1-935881-85-8.
