= Warsztaty Szybowcowe Wrona =

Wrona
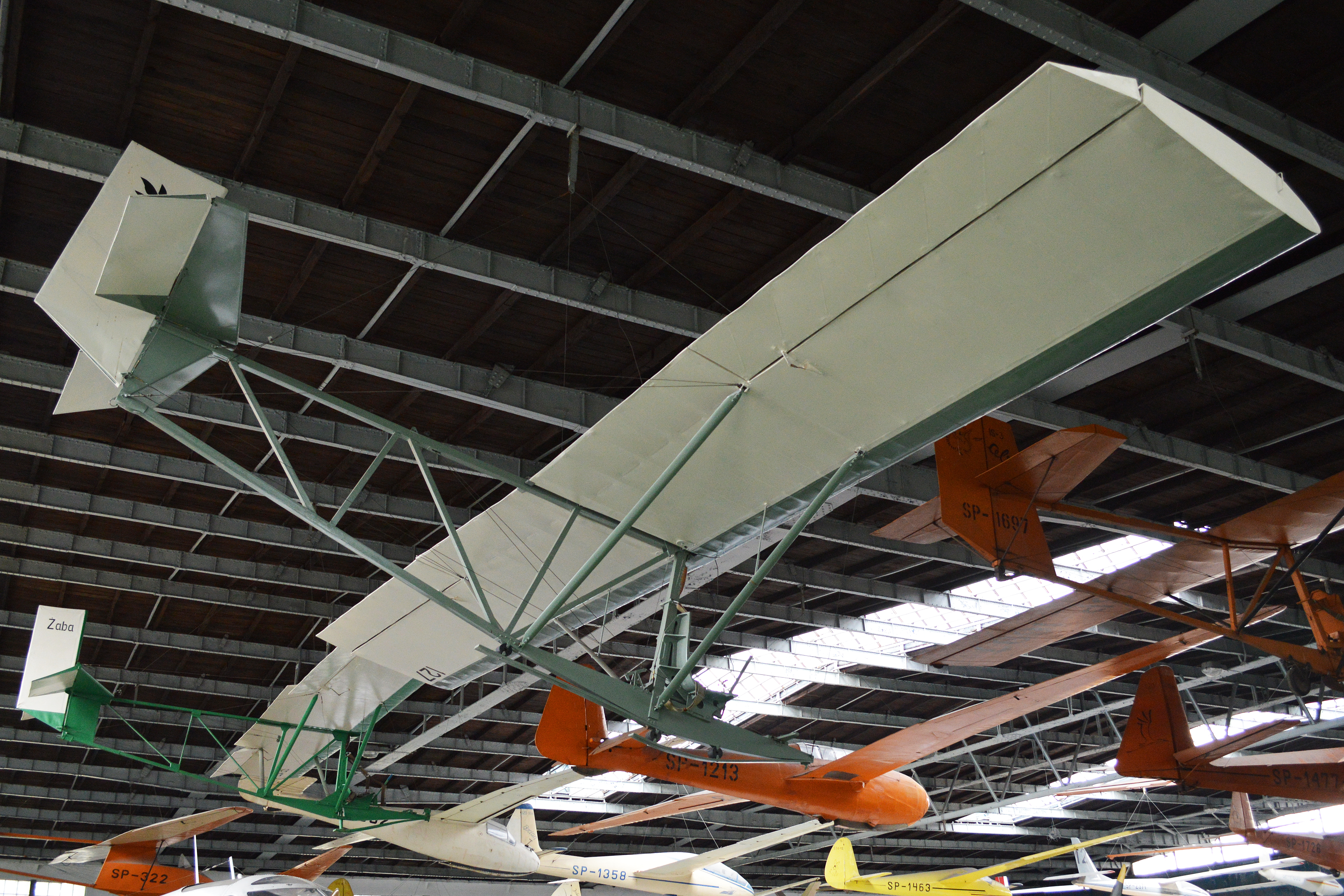
- Wrona bis

General information
- Type: primary trainer glider
- National origin: Poland
- Manufacturer: Warsztaty Szybowcowe
- Designer: Antoni Kocjan
- Number built: more than 430

History
- First flight: 6 September 1932

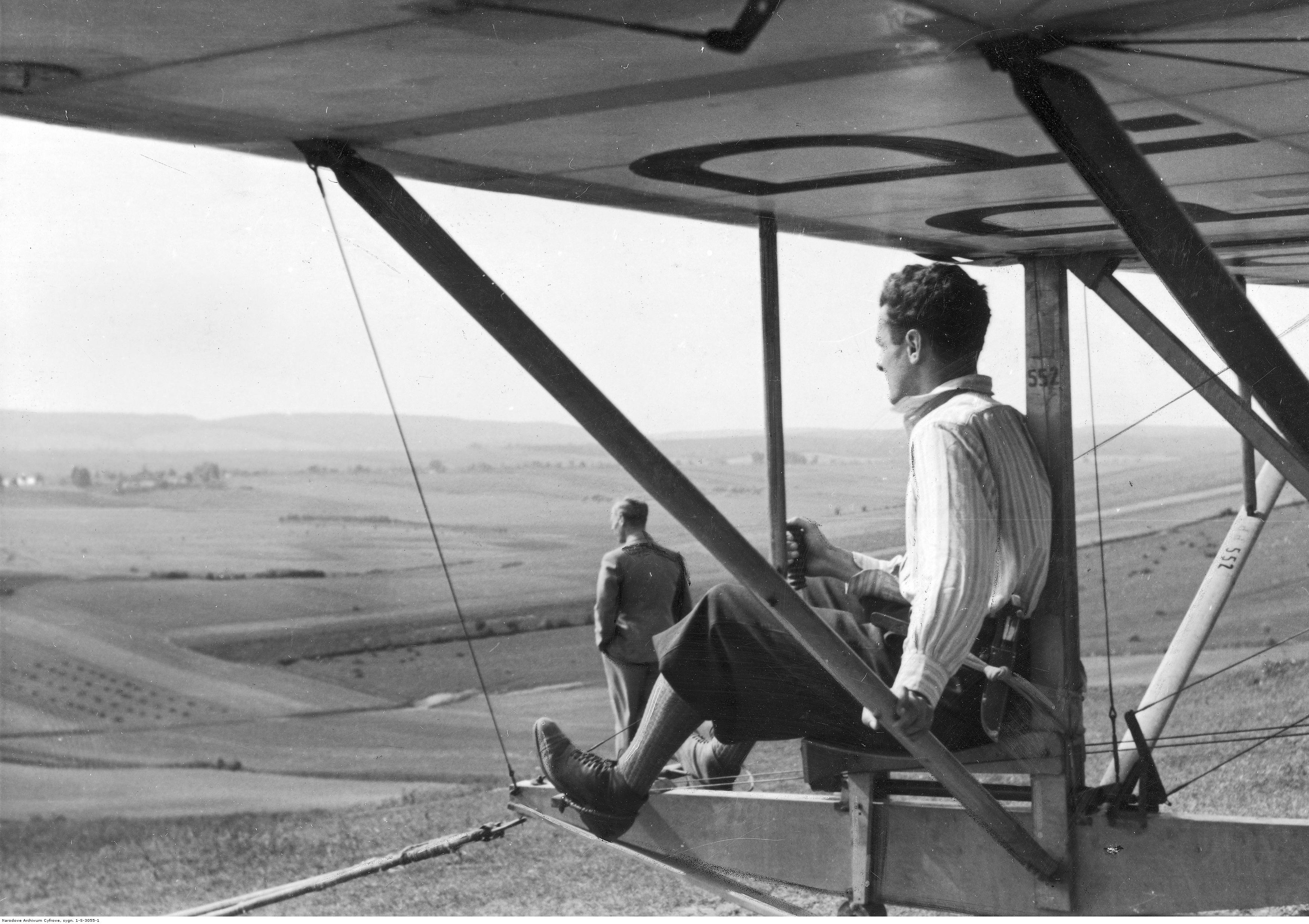
Wrona in 1937

The Warsztaty Szybowcowe Wrona (Glider Workshops Crow), or Kocjan Wrona after its designer, was the most numerous and widely used Polish pre-war primary glider.

== Design and development ==
Designed by Antoni Kocjan, the Wrona was in competition with the Czerwiński and Jaworski CWJ flown in 1931. Both were simple, high-wing and open frame (flat, uncovered girder fuselage) gliders in the style of the earlier German Zögling. With LOPP funding five pre-production airframes were built by Warsztaty Szybowcowe, the first flying from Mokotów on 30 September 1932 piloted by Mieczysław Jonikas.

Its two-part wing, mounted on top of the fuselage, was rectangular in plan and built around two spars. It was plywood-covered ahead of the forward spar, forming a torsion-resistant D-box, with the rest fabric-covered. On each side a pair of parallel struts braced the spars to the lower fuselage. Long, rectangular ailerons reached from strut to tip.

The upper and lower longerons or chords of the open-frame fuselage were joined together with vertical and diagonal braces. The pilot sat, unprotected, under the wing leading edge on a seat on the forward vertical brace. Aft, the Wrona's triangular fin extended above and between the longerons and carried a tall, nearly rectangular rudder which reached down to the lower longeron. Its narrow, triangular tailplane, mounted on the upper longeron, carried rectangular elevators with a deep cut-out for rudder movement. Fixed tail surfaces were ply-covered and the control surfaces fabric-covered. Wronas landed on a tandem pair of sprung skids on the lower longeron.

The early Wronas had a wing with a span of 8.8 m (28 ft 10 in) and area of 13.2 m^{2} (142 sq ft) but by 1934 the revised Worna bis had span and area increased by about 5%. Extended exposure to novice pilots revealed a tendency to enter a spin at high angles of attack caused by over-sensitive elevators. Several proposed solutions were tested and in the later 1930s, the problem was successfully resolved when all Wrona bis had their elevator areas reduced, together with a tailplane of increased area set at a negative angle of incidence (-2º).

== Operational history ==
Wrona production began in 1933 and continued up to the Invasion of Poland in 1939, with about 100 built at Kocjan's Warsztaty Szybowcowe factory and another 250 built under licence in at least seven other European countries. Construction drawings, materials and parts were sold, with at least 50 aircraft built by clubs and similar organizations.

It is not surprising that a basic trainer set no major records; but in June 1938, a Wrona bis made a 6.5 km (4.0 mi; 3.5 nmi) cross-country flight, a first (and last) record for an open girder glider in Poland. In April 1935 another, accompanied by a Warsztaty Lotnicze Czajka, made the first winch launchings in the country.

Only one or two survived the war. One Wrona bis remained in use until 1950, after which it became a museum exhibit. In December 1963 it was acquired by the Polish Aviation Museum in Kraków, where it remains on display.

== Variants ==
Wrona
Prototypes and 1933 production variant.

Wrona bis
Superseded Wrona in 1934 production with a wing of greater span and area. Modified in the late 1930s to overcome over-sensitive elevators and associated spinning tendencies.

== Specifications (Wrona bis) ==
Data from Samoloty

General characteristics

- Capacity: One
- Length: 5.6 m (18 ft 4 in)
- Wingspan: 9.31 m (30 ft 7 in)
- Height: 1.9 m (6 ft 3 in)
- Wing area: 13.9 m^{2} (150 sq ft)
- Empty weight: 75 kg (165 lb)
- Gross weight: 150 kg (331 lb)

Performance

- Maximum glide ratio: 11 at 50 km/h (31 mph; 27 kn)
- Rate of sink: 1.2 m/s (240 ft/min) at 48 km/h (30 mph; 26 kn)
- Minimum speed: 45 km/h (28 mph; 24 kn)
