= Warsztaty Szybowcowe Sroka =

Sroka
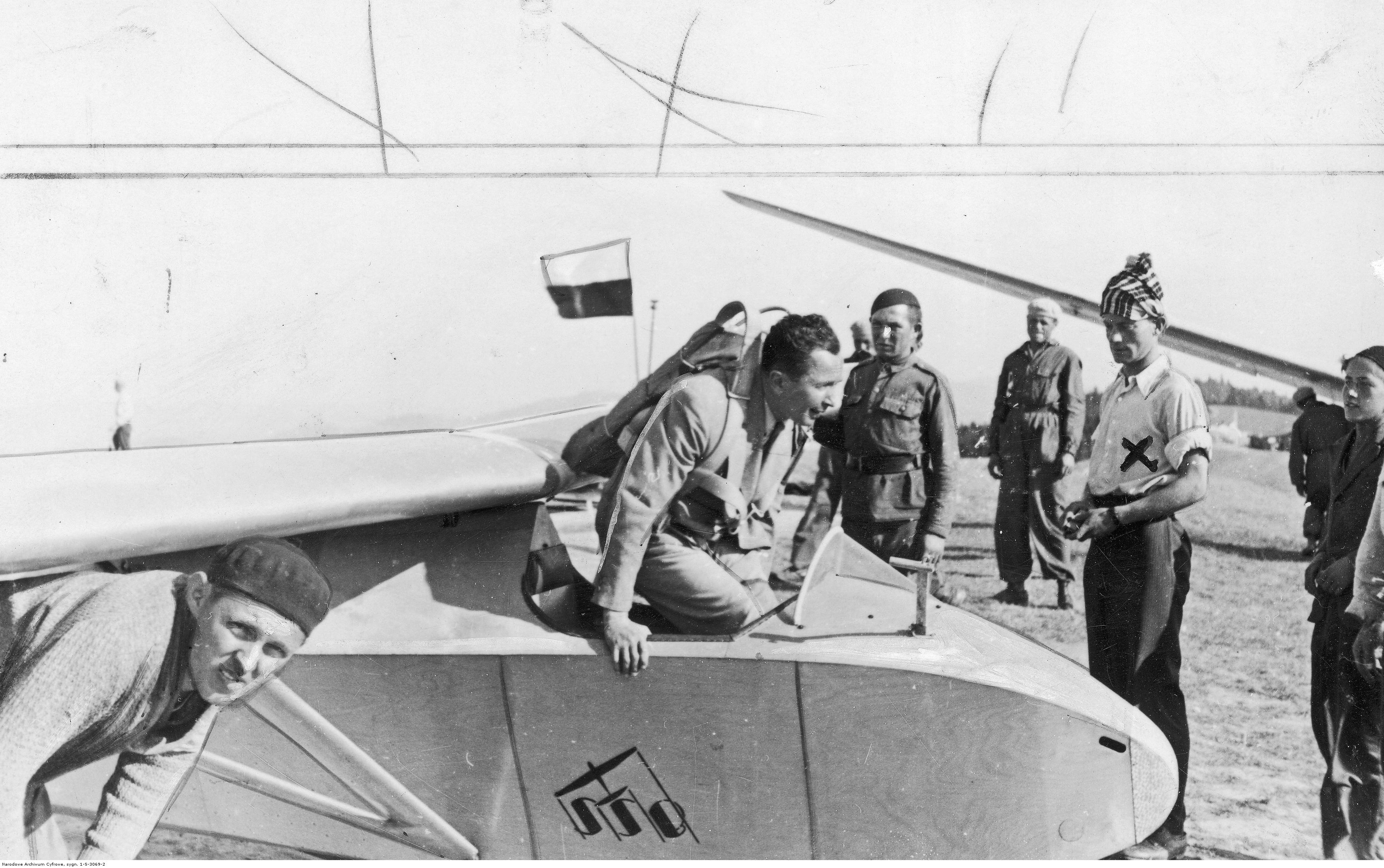

General information
- Type: Intermediate training glider
- National origin: Poland
- Manufacturer: Warsztaty Syzbowcowe
- Designer: Antoni Kocjan
- Number built: 55-60

History
- First flight: 14 April 1934
- Developed from: Warsztaty Szybowcowe Komar

The Warsztaty Szybowcowe Sroka (Glider Workshops Magpie), or Kocjan Sroka after its designer, was a Polish intermediate training glider. About sixty were built between 1934 and 1939.

== Design and development ==
Like its predecessor the Warsztaty Szybowcowe Komar the Sroka was an intermediate glider, designed to bridge the gap in performance between primary and high-performance gliders. The early Komars had some structural weakness that prevented cloud flying, so the smaller Sroka was strengthened and capable of flying faster, though its much lower aspect ratio (8.6 compared with 14.9) wing produced a somewhat lower glide ratio and higher rate of sink.

The Sroka was an all-wood aircraft with a high, two-part wing of constant thickness and rectangular plan out to rounded tips. The two parts joined centrally on the upper fuselage and were built around twin spars. Plywood covering around the leading edge from the forward spar formed a torsion resistant D-box, with fabric-covering aft. It was braced with V-struts on either side from the lower fuselage longerons to the wing spars. Long, constant chord, Frise-type ailerons occupied more than half the span; the Sroka was the first Polish glider to use them.

The Sroka's ply-covered fuselage was hexagonal in section with deep, slightly converging sides. Its open cockpit was just ahead of the wing leading edge. Behind it an upper fuselage ridge enclosed the wing mounting then gradually fell away over a tapering fuselage structure to the tail. The tail unit was similar to that of the Komar with a very small, ply-covered fin and a generous, round-tipped but slightly angular, largely fabric-covered balanced rudder which extended to the keel. The horizontal surfaces were of the all-flying type and fabric-covered apart from ply-reinforced leading edges. They were mounted on the fin just above the fuselage. A sprung skid underneath the forward fuselage usually formed the undercarriage though there were fittings for wheeled gear if the landing surface was suitable.

== Operational history ==
The first Sroka flew on 14 April 1934, piloted by Tadeusz Ciastuła and towed by a car, with air-towed flights following on the 18 and 24 April. It had good manoeuvrability, well balanced controls and pleasant flight characteristics. Production began in 1934 and continued up to the Invasion of Poland in 1939, with between thirty-five and forty built by Warsztaty Szybowcowe and about twenty, under licence, by the Silesian Glider Workshop at Bielsko.

== Specifications ==
Data from J. Cynk, 1974 unless noted

General characteristics

- Crew: One
- Length: 5.2 m (17 ft 1 in) or 6.2 m (20 ft 4 in)
- Wingspan: 11.48 m (37 ft 8 in)
- Height: 1.25 m (4 ft 1 in)
- Wing area: 15.3 m^{2} (165 sq ft)
- Aspect ratio: 8.6
- Empty weight: 92 kg (203 lb)
- Gross weight: 175 kg (386 lb)

Performance

- Maximum glide ratio: 18 best at 64 km/h (40 mph; 35 kn)
- Rate of sink: 0.87 m/s (171 ft/min) at 48 km/h (30 mph; 26 kn)
- Minimum speed:42 km/h (26 mph; 23 kn)
