= NAVO RK-P4/220 =

RK-P4/220

General information
- Type: Reconnaissance aircraft/passenger aircraft
- National origin: Netherlands
- Manufacturer: NAVO Nederlandse Automobiel en-Vleegtuig Onderneming (Dutch Motorcar and Aircraft Co.)
- Designer: Walter Rethel and Keidel
- Number built: 1

History
- First flight: 29 November 1920
- Retired: c. March 1921

The NAVO RK-4/220 was a Dutch aircraft originally designed for unofficial crowd observation but which was completed as an airliner. Only one was built; it flew, but was never certified.

== Design and development ==
NAVO and its only design were result of conditions immediately after World War I, during which the Netherlands had remained neutral. Concern among some in the Netherlands over popular left wing movements in Germany led to vigilante groups arming themselves, but they found it difficult to acquire or import aircraft. After their attempt to purchase Luchtvaartafdeling (LVA) reconnaissance aircraft was rejected, the group in Cuijk contacted Kondor Flugzeugwerke of Gelsenkirchen and their designer Walther Rethel. They set up a company called the Nederlandse Automobiel en- Vliegtuig Onderneming, funded by a Cuijk-based export butcher called J. van der Eyken, to provide a Dutch base for the German engineers and the two Kondor E.III fighter aircraft they brought with them. Meanwhile, the fear of revolution subsided and NAVO decided to develop it into an airliner instead.

The RK-4/220 was probably named after the two designers' initials, the initial number of passengers and the 220 hp (160 kW) of its Benz Bz.IV six cylinder water-cooled upright inline engine. It had an aerodynamically thick parasol wing with a constant chord centre section, tapered outer panels and square tips. The wings were constructed using a method patented by Kondor and previously used on the Kondor E.III, which had prominent flange-type ribs with curved panels between them. Kondor claimed the raised ribs improved the aerodynamics. Small, unbalanced ailerons were extended in from the wing tips. On each side a pair of parallel struts joined the lower fuselage longerons to the outer ends of the wing centre section, assisted by an additional strut on each side which from the top of the forward main support to the front of the engine mounting. Four short vertical struts close to the centreline formed the cabane, to hold the wing just above the fuselage. The rectangular section fuselage had the underside curved to about halfway back, from where it tapered up to the tail. The Benz engine was completely enclosed and cooled by radiators on the nose, and on the leading edge of the wing. Entry to the cabin was by triangular doors in both sides. Aft of the doors two square windows admitted light into the cabin, with the rear ones much lower. The pilot sat in an open cockpit behind the cabin at the trailing edge of the wing. At the rear the horizontal and vertical tail were almost circular, both carrying horn balanced control surfaces. The rudder was a broad, deep oval and the elevators were cropped and with a large V cut-out for rudder movement, and a straight but tapered trailing edge. The RK-4/220 had a fixed narrow-track single-axle conventional undercarriage with V-struts to the lower fuselage, transversely cross-braced with wires. There was a sprung tailskid.

The NAVO made its first flight from the company's field at Maldense Heath between Cuijk and Nijmegen on 29 November 1920. After further test flights it flew to Soesterberg for certification. There were delays to the tests caused by engine problems, then in March NAVO decided to remove it, uncertified, before Van der Eyken's money ran out and it is believed the RK-4/220 was broken up soon after.

== Specifications ==
Data from Wesselink

General characteristics

- Crew: One
- Capacity: Four passengers
- Length: 9.50 m (31 ft 2 in)
- Wingspan: 13.80 m (45 ft 3 in)
- Gross weight: 1,750 kg (3,858 lb)
- Powerplant: 1 × Benz Bz.IV 6-cylinder water-cooled upright inline engine, 160 kW (220 hp)
- Propellers: 2-bladed

Performance

- Maximum speed: 170 km/h (110 mph, 92 kn) at 1000 m (3,280 ft)
