= Kam-Craft Kamvair-2 =

Kamvair-2

General information
- Type: Homebuilt aircraft
- National origin: United States
- Manufacturer: Kam-craft

The Kam-Craft Kamvair-2 is an American aircraft designed for homebuilt construction.

== Design and development ==
The Kamvair-2 is a two- or four-place, strut-braced, high-wing amphibious aircraft, powered by a single engine mounted over the wings. The fuselage is of all-wood construction.

== Specifications (Kamvair-2) ==
Data from Air Trails

General characteristics

- Crew: one
- Capacity: one passenger
- Length: 24 ft 2 in (7.37 m)
- Wingspan: 36 ft (11 m)
- Height: 7 ft 10 in (2.39 m)
- Wing area: 160 sq ft (15 m^{2})
- Empty weight: 1,150 lb (522 kg)
- Gross weight: 1,650 lb (748 kg)
- Fuel capacity: 20 U.S. gallons (76 L; 17 imp gal)
- Powerplant: 1 × Chevrolet Corvair engine conversion 6-cyl horizontally opposed air-cooled piston engine, 125 hp (93 kW)
- Propellers: 2-bladed

Performance

- Maximum speed: 87 kn (100 mph, 160 km/h)
- Cruise speed: 78 kn (90 mph, 140 km/h)
- Stall speed: 17 kn (20 mph, 32 km/h)
- Range: 260 nmi (300 mi, 480 km)
- Service ceiling: 8,000 ft (2,400 m)

== See also ==
Aircraft of comparable role, configuration, and era

- Taylor Coot Low wing amphibious homebuilt
