= Kochyerigin LBSh =

LBSh
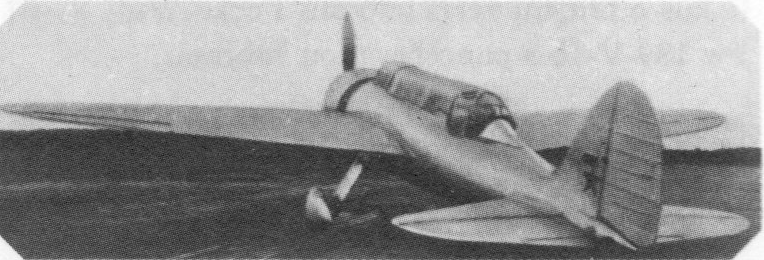

General information
- Type: Light attack aircraft
- National origin: Soviet Union
- Designer: Sergei Aleksandrovich Kochyerigin
- Status: prototype only
- Number built: 2

LBSh (Russian: ЛБШ, initially known simply as Ш, short for shturmovik) was a light ground attack aircraft (shturmovik) designed in 1939 by Sergei Aleksandrovich Kochyerigin.

A low-wing monoplane of mixed construction with fixed undercarriage, the design proved underpowered although decently armed. Offensive armament included two ShVAK 20 mm autocannons in the wing roots, two ShKAS machine guns in the wings and up to 600 kg of bombload. Defensive armament consisted of one turret-mounted ShKAS machine gun firing rearwards.

Only two prototypes were ever built: Sh-1 powered by Tumansky M-88 air-cooled radial engine and Sh-2 powered by earlier Tumansky M-87A. Initially the Sh-1 was accepted by the Soviet aviation into serial production, but the decision was soon overturned and the Factory No. 292 was ordered to focus on Yatsenko I-28 and Yakovlev Yak-1 fighters instead.

General characteristics Performance
