= Kestrel KL-1 =

1990s American single-engined aircraft

KL-1
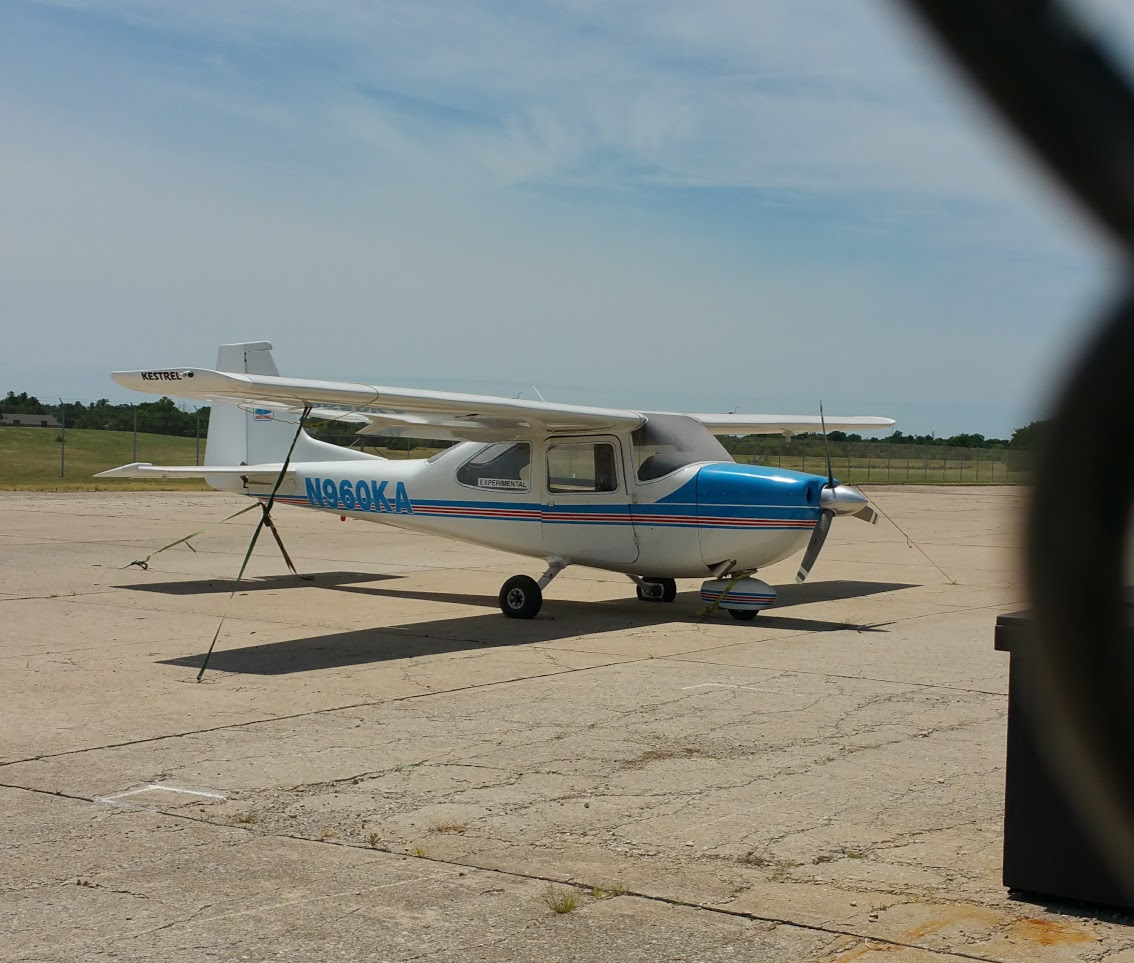

General information
- Type: Single-engine utility aircraft
- National origin: United States
- Manufacturer: Kestrel Aircraft Company
- Number built: 3

History
- First flight: November 19, 1995

The Kestrel KL-1 is an American single-engined four-seat utility aircraft designed and built in the 1990s by the Kestrel Aircraft Company of Norman, Oklahoma.

== Design and development ==
The KL-1 is a composite fuselage cantilever high-wing cabin monoplane designed to meet the requirements of the utility and normal categories of Part 23 of the Federal Aviation Regulations. It had a fixed tricycle landing gear and a conventional four-seat cabin layout. The prototype designated KL-1A and registered N960KA first flew on 19 November 1995 and was powered by a 160 hp (119 kW) Lycoming O-320-D2G piston engine driving a two-bladed fixed pitch propeller.

A number of improved variants of the KL-1 were planned including an armed observation or forward air control version with underwing weapon pylons.

While the prototype was test flying to gain certification the programme was abandoned.

== Variants ==
KL-1A
Baseline four-seat production variant with a 160 hp (119 kW) Lycoming O-320-D2G piston engine, one built.
KL-1B
Proposed de-luxe four-seat variant with a 190 hp (142 kW) Lycoming IO-360-ES piston engine, not built.
KL-1C
Proposed high-performance variant with a 250 hp (186 kW) Continental TSIO-360C piston engine, 2 built.
KL-1D
Proposed six-seat utility and cargo variant with a 325 hp (242 kW) Continental TSIO-550-B engine, and an optional floatplane conversion, not built.
KL-1R
Proposed retractable landing gear variant of the KL-1B with a 190 hp (142 kW) Lycoming IO-360-ES piston engine, not built.
K250A
Proposed military armed observation or forward area control variant of the KL-1C with additional observation windows and underwing weapons pods, not built.

== Specifications (KL-1A) ==
Data from Jane's All the World's Aircraft 1995-1996

General characteristics

- Crew: 1
- Capacity: 3
- Length: 26 ft 9 in (8.15 m)
- Wingspan: 36 ft 9 in (11.20 m)
- Height: 8 ft 11 in (2.73 m)
- Wing area: 179.6 sq ft (16.69 m^{2})
- Empty weight: 1,375 lb (624 kg)
- Gross weight: 2,500 lb (1,134 kg)
- Powerplant: 1 × Lycoming O-320-D2G four-cylinder piston engine. , 160 hp (119 kW)

Performance

- Cruise speed: 143 mph (230 km/h, 124 kn)
- Stall speed: 54 mph (87 km/h, 47 kn)
- Range: 1,088 mi (1,752 km, 945 nmi)
- Service ceiling: 13,000 ft (3,965 m)
- Rate of climb: 700 ft/min (3.6 m/s)

== See also ==
Aircraft of comparable role, configuration, and era

- Cessna 172
