= Kawanishi E13K =

Japanese reconnaissance floatplane

E13K

General information
- Type: reconnaissance floatplane
- Manufacturer: Kawanishi Aircraft Company
- Primary user: IJN Air Service

History
- First flight: 28 September 1938

The Kawanishi E13K, company designation AM-19, was an experimental Japanese 1930s three-seat reconnaissance floatplane. Two prototypes were produced.

== Design and development ==
In 1937, the Imperial Japanese Navy requested the Kawanishi Aircraft Company and Aichi Kokuki to design a replacement for the Navy's E7K seaplanes. Kawanishi's design, given the short designation E13K and long designation Kawanishi Navy 12-Shi Three-seat Reconnaissance Seaplane, was an all-metal, single-float seaplane armed with one Type 92 machine gun and either one bomb under the fuselage or four bombs under the wings.

The first of two E13K prototypes flew on 28 September 1938. In October 1938, the aircraft was transferred to the fleet base for testing, and, even though the E13K outperformed the Aichi E13A except in maximum speed, it was difficult to operate, so the Navy chose the E13A to be the replacement for the E7K. The first prototype suffered an accident due to excessive vibration, and the second vanished during a test flight and was not recovered.

== Operators ==
Japan

- Imperial Japanese Navy Air Service

== Specifications ==
Data from Japanese Aircraft, 1910-1941

General characteristics

- Crew: 3
- Length: 11.725 m (38 ft 6 in)
- Wingspan: 14.49 m (47 ft 6 in)
- Height: 4.453 m (14 ft 7 in)
- Wing area: 34 m^{2} (370 sq ft)
- Empty weight: 2,170 kg (4,784 lb)
- Gross weight: 3,550 kg (7,826 lb)
- Powerplant: 1 × Mitsubishi MK8 Kinsei 3-Kai 14-cylinder air-cooled radial piston engine, 680 kW (910 hp)
- Propellers: 3-bladed variable pitch propeller

Performance

- Maximum speed: 350 km/h (220 mph, 190 kn)
- Cruise speed: 222 km/h (138 mph, 120 kn)
- Alighting speed:107 km/h (66 mph; 58 kn)
- Endurance: 16 hours
- Service ceiling: 6,690 m (21,950 ft)
- Time to altitude: 4,000 m (13,000 ft) in 9 minutes 14 seconds
- Wing loading: 104.4 kg/m^{2} (21.4 lb/sq ft)
- Power/mass: 5.2 kg/kW (8.6 lb/hp)

Armament

- Guns: 1× flexible 7.7 mm (0.303 in) Type 92 machine gun (Lewis gun)
- Bombs: 240–250 kg (530–550 lb) of bombs

== See also ==
Related lists

- List of military aircraft of Japan
- List of seaplanes and flying boats
