= Kinetic Mountain Goat =

Mountain Goat

General information
- Type: Two-seat cabin monoplane
- National origin: United States
- Manufacturer: Kinetic Aviation
- Designer: Bill Montagne

History
- First flight: 1997

The Kinetic Mountain Goat is an American two-seat cabin monoplane, designed by Bill Montagne for his company Kinetic Aviation.

== Design and development ==
The Mountain Goat is a high-wing braced monoplane with a fixed conventional landing gear with a tailwheel. Powered by a 180 hp (134 kW) Lycoming IO-360-B2E flat-four piston engine with a Kinetic-designed two-bladed tractor propeller. The enclosed cabin has two seats in tandem with dual controls, each side has a one-piece Plexiglas door for access.

== Specification ==
Data from Jane's All the World's Aircraft 2003-04.

General characteristics

- Crew: 2
- Length: 24 ft 4 in (7.42 m)
- Wingspan: 35 ft 6 in (10.82 m)
- Height: 6 ft 9 in (2.06 m)
- Wing area: 188.0 sq ft (17.47 m^{2})
- Empty weight: 1,225 lb (556 kg)
- Max takeoff weight: 2,475 lb (1,123 kg)
- Powerplant: 1 × Lycoming IO-360-B2E flat-four piston engine, 180 hp (130 kW)
- Propellers: 2-bladed Kinetic Aviation ground-adjustable pitch

Performance

- Cruise speed: 159 mph (256 km/h, 138 kn) 75% power
- Stall speed: 50 mph (81 km/h, 44 kn) power off and flaps up
- Never exceed speed: 213 mph (342 km/h, 185 kn)
- Range: 659 mi (1,061 km, 573 nmi) with max fuel and 45 minute reserve
- Rate of climb: 1,700 ft/min (8.6 m/s)
