= Warsztaty Szybowcowe Sokół =

Sokół
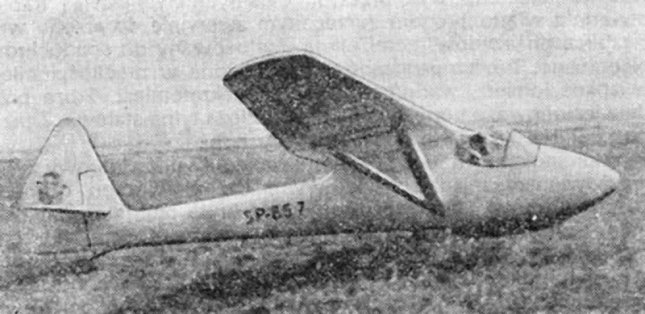

General information
- Type: Aerobatic sailplane
- National origin: Poland
- Manufacturer: Warsztaty Szybowcowe
- Designer: Antoni Kocjan
- Number built: 10

History
- First flight: Spring 1934 or spring 1935

The Warsztaty Szybowcowe Sokół was a 1930s Polish aerobatic sailplane. Ten were built and flown by Polish aeroclubs, participating in national and international events, until the outbreak of the Second World War.

== Design and development ==
The Sokół was designed in response to an official call for an aerobatic glider and was in competition with the Czerwiński CW 7. Cynk, writing in 1971, dates the first flight to the spring of 1934 but Glass's account, written more recently, puts it a year later.

It was an all-wood aircraft, with a two-part, high wing. Each half was built around two spars, with a torsion resistant D-box between the leading edge and the forward spar formed with plywood-covering. Elsewhere the wings were fabric covered. The central 30% of the span was rectangular in plan and the remainder straight-tapered to rounded tips. The half-wings joined on a faired-in structure above the fuselage and each was braced with a faired V-strut from the lower fuselage to the wing spars near the outer end of the inner section. There was significant dihedral over the whole span, emphasised by under-surface airfoil thinning outboard. Ailerons occupied about half the span.

The Sokół's tapered, oval-section fuselage had a plywood semi-monocoque structure with the cockpit immediately ahead of the wing leading edge. On early Sokółs this was open but the improved Sokół bis had an enclosed cockpit. The fuselage structure included a short fin which mounted a large, rounded balanced rudder that reached down to the keel and an all moving tail, largely fabric-covered and with a rudder cut-out, positioned a little above the fuselage. There was a pneumatically sprung landing skid under the forward fuselage.

Two high speed, non-fatal accidents caused by structural failures led to the improved the Sokół bis, the first of which was built in the spring of 1937.

== Operational history ==
One batch of five Sokóls and another batch of five Sokół bis were built and served Polish aeroclubs until the Invasion of Poland in 1939, though the accidents speed-limited the former. One Sokól performed aerobatics at the ISTUS international meeting held in Budapest and another was used in the First Aerobatic Course in Warsaw, held in June 1935. In May-June 1937 a Sokół bis, towed by a RWD-8, visited Romania, Bulgaria, Yugoslavia, Hungary and Austria as part of Warsaw Aeroclubs Balkan rally and in August-September one took part in the International Scout Rally in the Netherlands.

== Variants ==
Sokół
Original version, five built.

Sokół bis
Improved version, five built.

== Specifications ==
Data from Samolotypolskie.pl

General characteristics

- Crew: One
- Length: 5.2 m (17 ft 1 in)
- Wingspan: 11.6 m (38 ft 1 in)
- Height: 1.6 m (5 ft 3 in)
- Wing area: 13.1 m^{2} (141 sq ft)
- Aspect ratio: 10.3
- Empty weight: 105 kg (231 lb)
- Gross weight: 190 kg (419 lb)

Performance

- Maximum glide ratio: 19 at 60 km/h (37 mph; 32 kn) best
- Rate of sink: 0.85 m/s (167 ft/min) minimum, at 54 km/h (34 mph; 29 kn)
- Minimum speed:48 km/h (30 mph; 26 kn)
