= Kawanishi K6K =

Japanese floatplane trainer prototype

K6K

General information
- Type: Floatplane trainer
- Manufacturer: Kawanishi Aircraft Company
- Primary user: IJN Air Service
- Number built: 3

History
- First flight: 30 April 1938

The Kawanishi K6K was a prototype Japanese training aircraft built by the Kawanishi Aircraft Company in the late 1930s.

== Design ==
The K6K was a two-seat, twin-float biplane with a welded steel-tube fuselage, covered in fabric, light alloy, a steel wing covered in fabric, and monocoque floats built from light alloy. It was conceived in response to an Imperial Japanese Navy requirement for an intermediate-level training seaplane. The first flight of the K6K occurred on 30 April 1938, but flight tests revealed poor alighting characteristics, so the K6K was not ordered into production.

== Specifications (K6K) ==
Data from Japanese Aircraft, 1910-1941

General characteristics

- Crew: 2
- Length: 9.3 m (30 ft 6 in)
- Wingspan: 12.2 m (40 ft 0 in)
- Height: 4 m (13 ft 1 in)
- Wing area: 30 m^{2} (320 sq ft)
- Empty weight: 1,300 kg (2,866 lb)
- Gross weight: 1,800 kg (3,968 lb)
- Powerplant: 1 × Nakajima Kotobuki 2-Kai-1 9-cylinder air-cooled radial piston engine to 460 to 580 hp (340 to 430 kW)
- Propellers: 2-bladed fixed pitch propeller

Performance

- Maximum speed: 232 km/h (144 mph, 125 kn)
- Cruise speed: 160 km/h (99 mph, 86 kn)
- Endurance: 6 hours
- Time to altitude: 3,000 m (9,800 ft) in 11 minutes
- Wing loading: 60 kg/m^{2} (12 lb/sq ft)
- Power/mass: 5.3 kg/kW (8.7 lb/hp)
