= Koun Aircraft Dirigible Helicopter =

- Young Ho Koun holding onto the right wing of his Aircraft Dirigible Helicopter - Roosevelt Field, 1939

General information
- Type: Hybrid aircraft and vectored thrust aircraft
- National origin: United States
- Designer: Young Ho Koun
- Number built: 1

History
- Introduction date: 1939

The Kouns-Craft, described and registered as a Koun Aircraft Dirigible Helicopter was a patented experimental vehicle designed by Young Ho Koun, the first Chinese American to develop an aircraft in the United States.

== Design and development ==
Koun, a cook by profession, developed the Aircraft Dirigible Helicopter to demonstrate an aircraft with vertical takeoff and landing capability. The vehicle was constructed over the course of five years.

The vehicle resembled a conventional light aircraft with the exception of two large airfoil-shaped cuffs over the wings intended to hold compressed helium. The designer felt that using compressed helium would provide additional buoyancy, requiring less volume than an unpressurized dirigible. Contemporary reports stated that the helium would only provide ten pounds of lift. The exposed forward mounted engine was designed to tilt for forward or vertical thrust. A set of outrigger wheels on the wingtips were set for stability on the ground.

== Operational history ==
The prototype was assembled at Roosevelt Field, New York in 1939. The CAA gave the aircraft a registration number, but not an experimental certificate. The sole flight attempt was performed in front of media. After many failed engine start attempts, the aircraft was started without the pilot and the vehicle was damaged while securing it. The aircraft was not publicly displayed again.

== Specifications ==
Data from Experimenter

General characteristics

- Capacity: 1
- Wingspan: 30 ft (9.1 m)
- Powerplant: 1 × Continental A-40 , 37 hp (28 kW)
- Propellers: 2-bladed

Performance
