= Warsztaty Szybowcowe Orlik =

Polish glider

Orlik
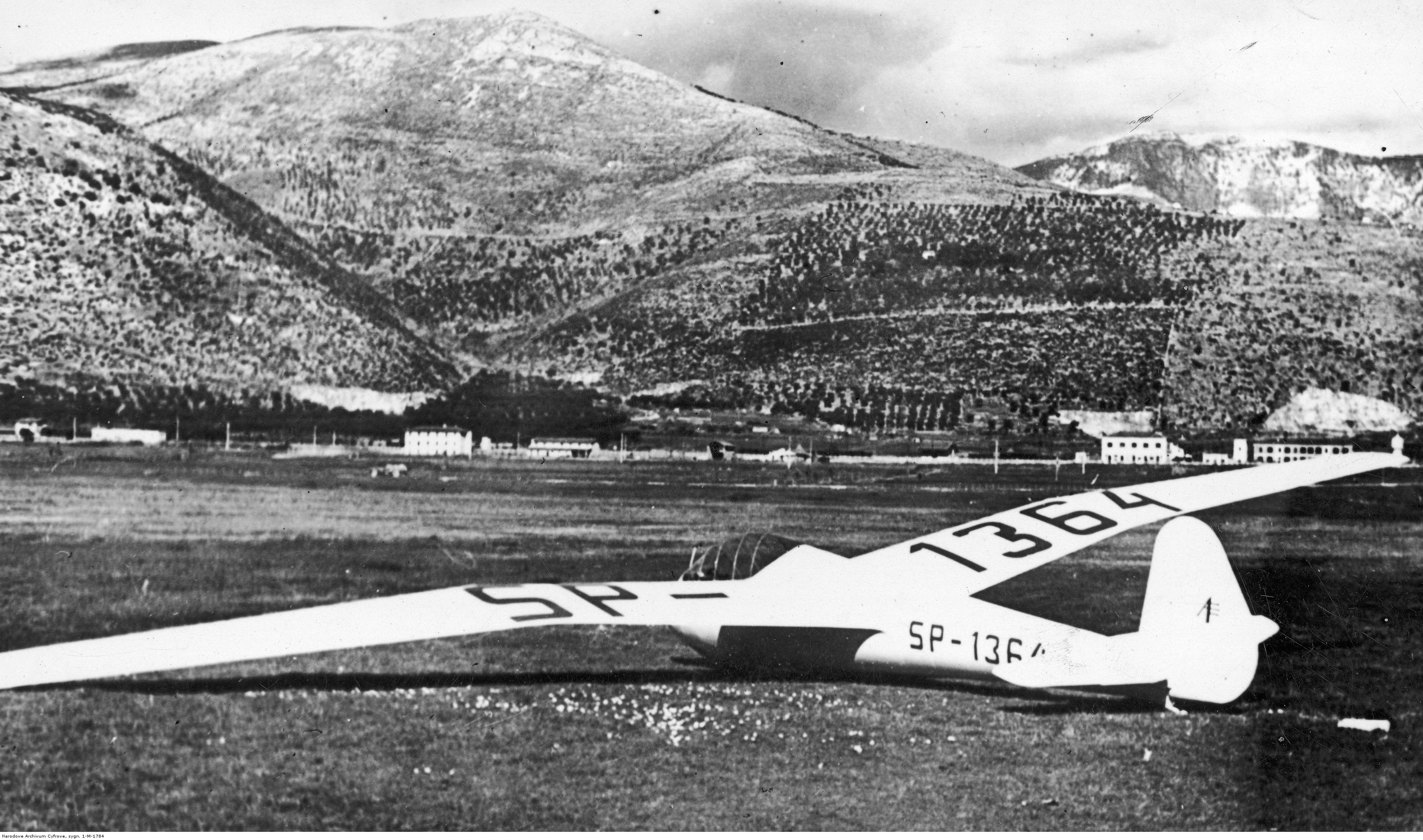

General information
- Type: Glider
- National origin: Poland
- Manufacturer: Warsztaty Szybowcowe
- Designer: Antoni Kocjan
- Status: Production completed
- Number built: 18

History
- First flight: 1937 (Orlik I)

The Warsztaty Szybowcowe Orlik (Glider Workshops Dove), also known as the Kocjan Orlik after the designer, is a family of Polish gull winged gliders that was designed by Antoni Kocjan and produced by Warsztaty Szybowcowe.

== Design and development ==
Kocjan designed the Orlik family of gliders in the late 1930s. The original Orlik had a 14.4 m (47.2 ft) wingspan. The Orlik 2 had a 15.4 m (50.5 ft) wingspan and a glide ratio of 26.5:1. The Orlik 3 was proposed as the One-Design type for the 1940 Summer Olympics, but the DFS Olympia Meise was chosen instead. Regardless, the 1940 Olympics were cancelled by the advent of the Second World War. The development of the series was cut short by Kocjan's murder on 13 August 1944 by the Gestapo as part of the 1944 Warsaw Uprising.

The Orlik gliders were built with a wooden structure, the fuselage covered in wood, while the wings and tail were covered with doped aircraft fabric covering. Glidepath control is via an unusual pair of air brakes located on the underside of the wing just aft of the leading edge, extending from the wing root to the gull bend.

== Operational history ==
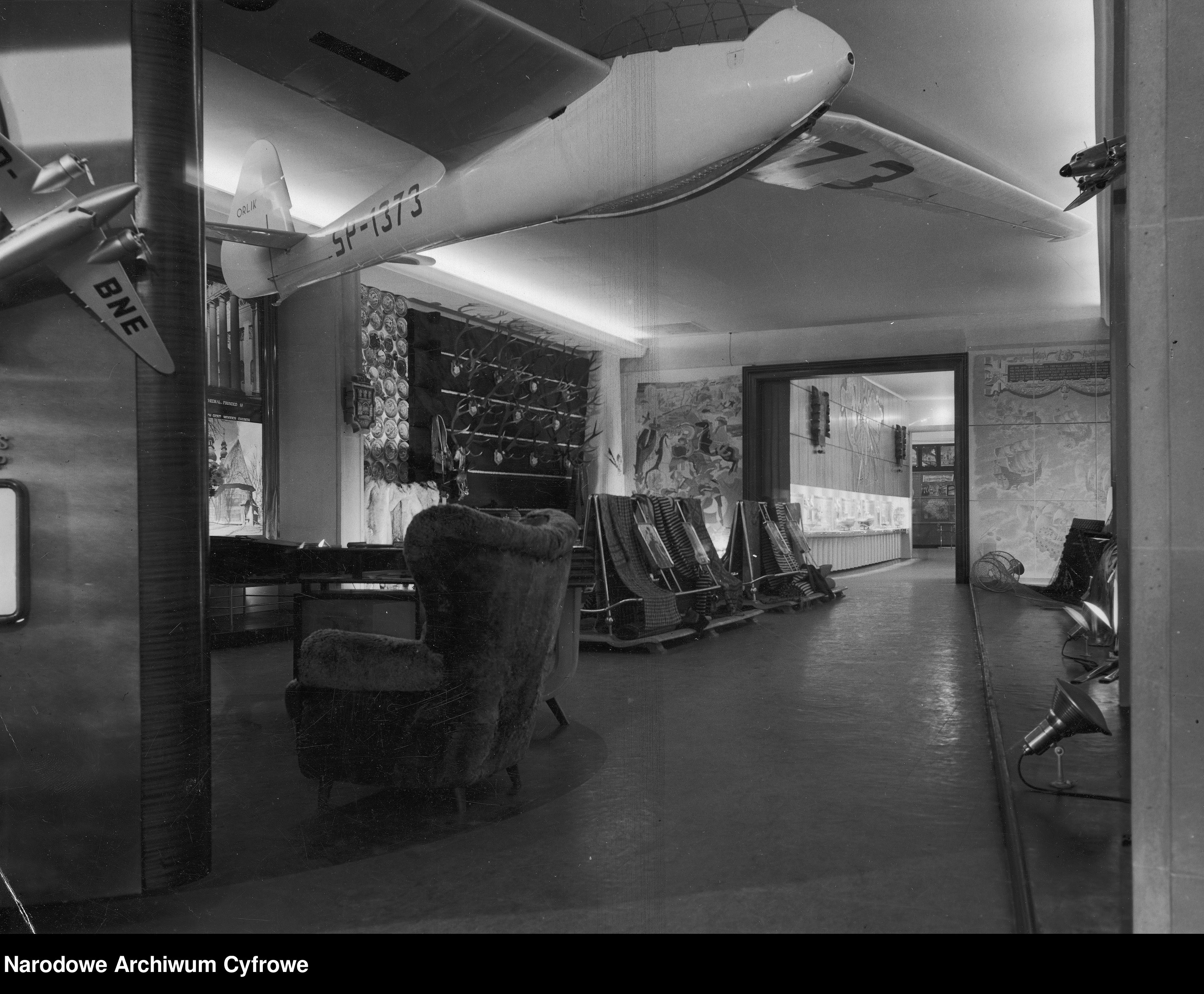
Orlik 2 in New York

One Orlik 2 was exhibited at the 1939 New York World's Fair. After the fair it was purchased by a private buyer and then confiscated by the US government and pressed into military service as a training glider with the designation XTG-7. After the Second World War ended it was sold as surplus and overhauled by Clarence See. It was then purchased by Paul MacCready who flew it in the 1948 and 1949 US Nationals, winning both contests. MacCready also used the aircraft to set a world altitude record of 9,000 m (29,528 ft) in 1948, flying in the Sierra mountain wave. MacCready later sold the Orlik to George Lambros and it was flown by Lyle Maxey in the 1961 US Nationals. Next it was purchased by Eldon M. Wilson who modified the aircraft with a faired fixed main wheel with a brake and added a free-blown bubble canopy. Wilson then sold it to John Serafin who intended to get his Diamond badge in the aircraft. The aircraft was completely rebuilt and restored by Ray Parker. In July 2011 the aircraft was owned by Dale Busque of Andover, Connecticut and was still registered with the Federal Aviation Administration in the Experimental - Exhibition/Racing category.

== Variants ==
Orlik 1
Original 1937 design, with a 14.4 m (47.2 ft) wingspan
Orlik 2
1938 development with a 15.4 m (50.5 ft) wingspan. One example was designated as XTG-7 in United States Army Air Corps service.
Orlik 3
Development for the 1940 Summer Olympics. The chosen type for the Olympics was the DFS Olympia Meise instead.

== Specifications (Orlik II) ==
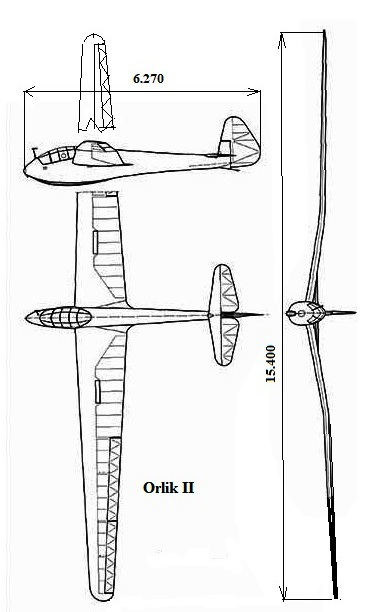
Orlik II

Data from Sailplane Directory and Soaring

General characteristics

- Crew: one
- Wingspan: 15.4 m (50 ft 6 in)
- Wing area: 15.10 m^{2} (162.5 sq ft)
- Aspect ratio: 14.7:1
- Empty weight: 160 kg (352 lb)
- Gross weight: 254 kg (561 lb)

Performance

- Maximum glide ratio: 26.5:1 at 71 km/h (44 mph)
- Wing loading: 16.8 kg/m^{2} (3.44 lb/sq ft)

== See also ==
Related lists

- List of gliders
