= Keitek Streamer =

Italian ultralight trike

Streamer

General information
- Type: Ultralight trike
- National origin: Italy
- Manufacturer: Keitek
- Status: In production (2013)

The Keitek Streamer is an Italian ultralight trike, designed and produced by Keitek of Remanzacco. The aircraft is supplied as a complete ready-to-fly-aircraft.

== Design and development ==
The aircraft was designed to comply with the Fédération Aéronautique Internationale microlight category, including the category's maximum gross weight of 450 kg (992 lb). The aircraft has a maximum gross weight of 450 kg (992 lb). It features a strut-braced "topless" Hazard 12S or 15S hang glider-style high-wing, weight-shift controls, a two-seats-in-tandem open cockpit with a cockpit fairing, tricycle landing gear with wheel pants and a single engine in pusher configuration.

The Streamer has a double surface wing covered in Dacron sailcloth. The Hazard 12S 9.8 m (32.2 ft) span wing has supporting struts and uses an "A" frame weight-shift control bar. The powerplant is a four-cylinder, air and liquid-cooled, four-stroke, dual-ignition 80 hp (60 kW) Rotax 912UL engine. The fuel tank includes internal baffling and the engine oil tank is enclosed inside the fuselage.

With the Hazard 12S wing the aircraft has an empty weight of 185 kg (408 lb) and a gross weight of 450 kg (992 lb), giving a useful load of 265 kg (584 lb). With full fuel of 64 litres (14 imp gal; 17 US gal) the payload is 219 kg (483 lb).

The Hazard 12S wing has an area of 12 m^{2} (130 sq ft) and is intended for experienced pilots, while the Hazard 15S wing has a wing area of 15 m^{2} (160 sq ft) and is envisioned as a school and student training wing. The Hazard 12S wing gives a cruising speed that is 30 km/h (19 mph) faster than the 15S wing.

== Specifications (Streamer with Hazard 12S wing) ==
Data from Bayerl

General characteristics

- Crew: one
- Capacity: one passenger
- Wingspan: 9.8 m (32 ft 2 in)
- Wing area: 12 m^{2} (130 sq ft)
- Empty weight: 185 kg (408 lb)
- Gross weight: 450 kg (992 lb)
- Fuel capacity: 64 litres (14 imp gal; 17 US gal)
- Powerplant: 1 × Rotax 912UL four cylinder, liquid and air-cooled, four stroke aircraft engine, 60 kW (80 hp)
- Propellers: 3-bladed composite

Performance

- Cruise speed: 160 km/h (99 mph, 86 kn)
- Stall speed: 65 km/h (40 mph, 35 kn)
- Wing loading: 37.5 kg/m^{2} (7.7 lb/sq ft)
