= Kozlowski WK.3 =

Polish training aircraft

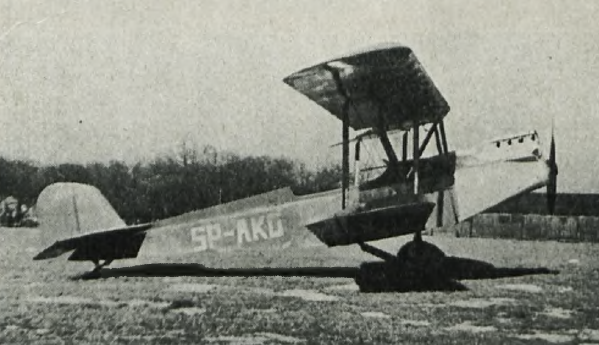

General information
- Type: Civil trainer aircraft
- National origin: Poland
- Designer: Władysław Kozłowski
- Number built: 2

History
- First flight: 28 June 1933

The Kozlowski WK.3 was a one-off Polish biplane trainer. It first flew in 1933 and was later re-engined, serving an aeroclub until the invasion of Poland.

== Design and development ==
The WK.3 was the second of Władysław Kozłowski's designs to be built. It was intended as an aeroclub basic trainer, strong, safe and easy to fly, comfortable and easy to maintain. He built it along with his friend Ludwik Antonowicz, who provided both constructional and financial assistance. They began in June 1932 and had completed the airframe by the following spring. No suitable modern engine was available, but Warsaw Aeroclub provided them with an old, 70 hp (52 kW) Anzani seven-cylinder radial engine. The first flight was on 26 June 1933, piloted by Ignacy Giedgowd. He and two other pilots carried out the initial tests, flying the WK.3 for 163 minutes. They reported good handling with short take-off and landing runs.

The WK.3 was a biplane with wooden structure throughout. The constant chord wings were each built around twin spars, covered with plywood around the leading edge and with fabric elsewhere. The upper wing had a centre-section mounted high above the fuselage on N-form cabane struts and outer panels which were swept at 8° to improve cockpit access and fields of view. The lower wing was unswept. Upper and lower wings were braced together with a pair of parallel interplane struts on each side and both had 4° of dihedral. The ailerons were on the lower wing.

Behind the Anzani engine the fuselage had ply covering over a rectangular-section frame. The tandem cockpits shared a single opening and had dual controls. The fabric-covered horizontal tail was mounted on top of the fuselage and the vertical surfaces were ply-covered. The fin, with a straight swept leading edge and blunt top, mounted a blunted rectangular rudder.

The WK.3 had a simple, fixed and conventional undercarriage. V-struts on either side from the lower longerons supported the mainwheels on a rubber cord damped single axle.

== Operational history ==
It was later re-engined with a more modern, Polish built upright, four-cylinder, air-cooled inline PZInż FS-II, which produced 90 hp (67 kW) and lengthened the nose by 300 mm (12 in). Łódź aeroclub used it from early 1935, probably up to the start of World War II.

== Specifications (PZInż FS-II engine) ==
Data from Samolotypolskie except where noted

General characteristics

- Crew: One pilot
- Capacity: One pupil
- Length: 6.8 m (22 ft 4 in)
- Wingspan: 9 m (29 ft 6 in)
- Height: 2.7 m (8 ft 10 in)
- Wing area: 21.0 m^{2} (226 sq ft)
- Airfoil: Göttingen 654
- Empty weight: 445 kg (981 lb)
- Gross weight: 715 kg (1,576 lb) for aerobatics
- Powerplant: 1 × PZInż FS-II air-cooled upright 4-cylinder inline, 67 kW (90 hp)
- Propellers: 2-bladed

Performance

- Maximum speed: 160 km/h (99 mph, 86 kn)
- Cruise speed: 135 km/h (84 mph, 73 kn)
- Stall speed: 68 km/h (42 mph, 37 kn) minimum speed
- Range: 670 km (420 mi, 360 nmi)
- Service ceiling: 3,700 m (12,100 ft)
- Rate of climb: 3.2 m/s (630 ft/min)
- Take-off distance: 60–80 m (200–260 ft)
