= Keystone Pronto =

1920s US mail plane design

K-55 Pronto
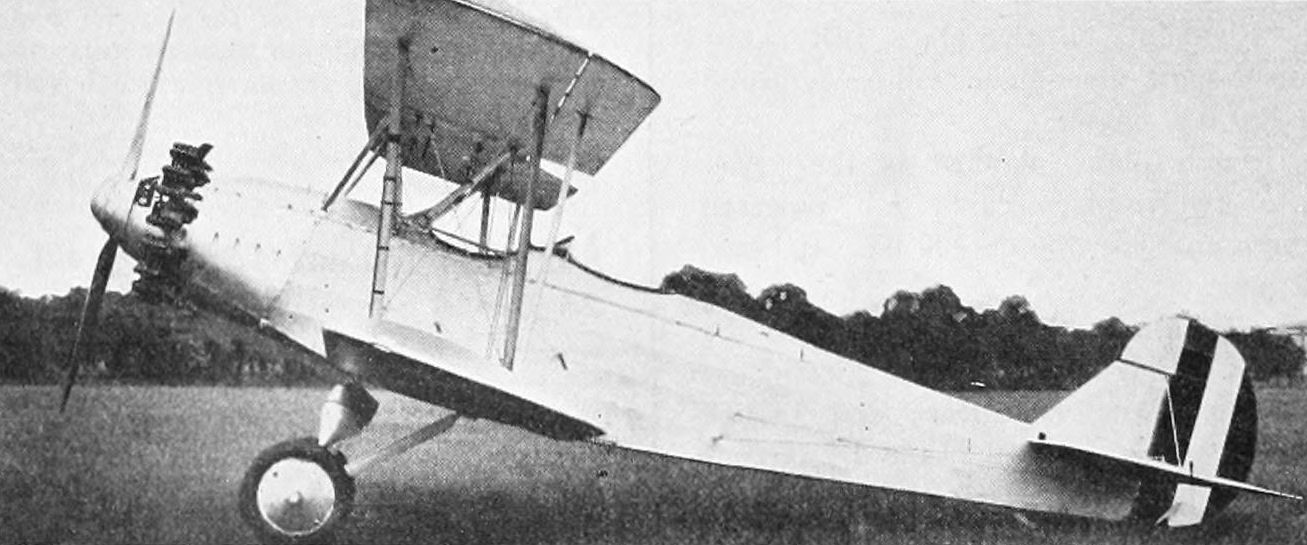

General information
- Type: Mail plane
- National origin: United States
- Manufacturer: Keystone Aircraft
- Primary user: Peruvian Navy

History
- First flight: 1927

The Keystone K-55 Pronto was a mail plane developed in the United States in the late 1920s.

== Design and development ==
The Pronto was a conventional single-bay, unequal-span biplane design with slightly staggered wings. The pilot sat in an open cockpit, in tandem with a second cockpit that could carry two passengers side-by-side. The fixed, tailskid undercarriage had divided main units.

A number of these aircraft were purchased by the government of Peru. Operated by the aviation arm of the Peruvian Navy, these aircraft initiated the first airmail service into the Peruvian Amazon. The first flight of this service was made by two Prontos, piloted by Leonardo Alvariño Herr and Harold B. Grow from Lima to San Ramón on 26 October 1927.

At least one Peruvian Pronto was fitted with pontoons and used to survey the Amazon River for locations suitable for seaplane operations.

In the Colombia-Peru War one Peruvian K-55 flown by Lieutenant Suero was captured by the Colombian Army.

== Operators ==
Peru

- Peruvian Navy

== Specifications ==
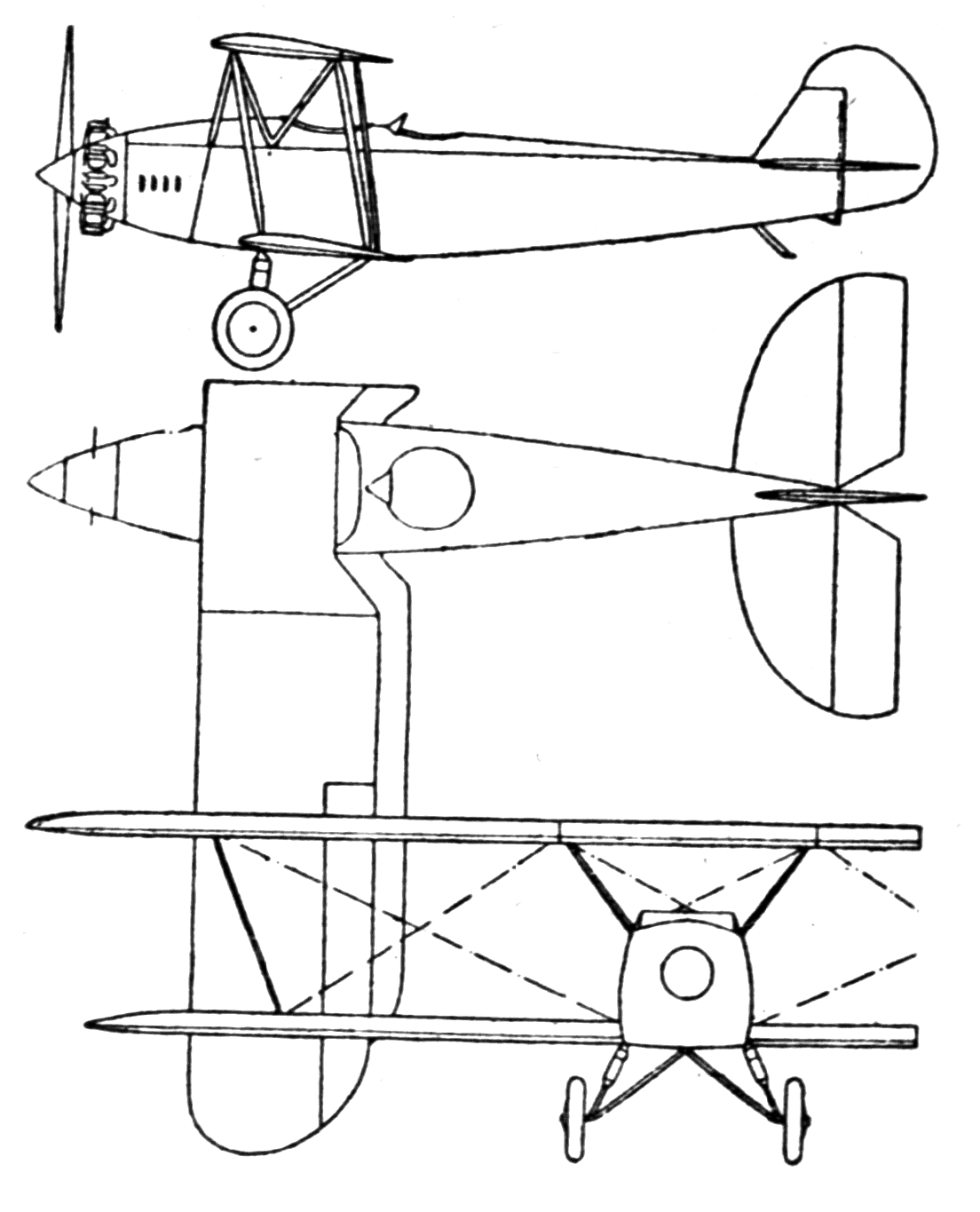
Keystone K-55 Pronto 3-view drawing from Le Document aéronautique April,1928

Data from Jane's all the World's Aircraft 1928

General characteristics

- Crew: 1
- Capacity: 2 pax
- Length: 26 ft 9 in (8.15 m)
- Wingspan: 38 ft 9 in (11.8 m)
- Wing area: 365 sq ft (33.9 m^{2})
- Airfoil: Göttingen 398
- Empty weight: 1,975 lb (896 kg) landplane; 2,375 lb (1,077 kg) floatplane
- Gross weight: 3,285 lb (1,490 kg) landplane; 3,685 lb (1,671 kg) floatplane
- Fuel capacity: 72 US gal (60 imp gal; 270 L) in two upper wing tanks
- Powerplant: 1 × Wright J-5 Whirlwind 9-cylinder air-cooled radial piston engine, 220 hp (160 kW)
- Propellers: 2-bladed

Performance

- Maximum speed: 112 mph (180 km/h, 97 kn) landplane at 3,204 lb (1,453 kg); 106 mph (92 kn; 171 km/h) floatplane at 3,204 lb (1,453 kg)
- Stall speed: 37 mph (60 km/h, 32 kn) landplane
- Range: 500 mi (800 km, 430 nmi)
- Rate of climb: 800 ft/min (4.1 m/s)
- Time to altitude: 10,000 ft (3,000 m) in 16 minutes 30 seconds landplane; 10,000 ft (3,000 m) in 40 minutes floatplane;
- Wing loading: 9 lb/sq ft (44 kg/m^{2}) landplane; 10.1 lb/sq ft (49 kg/m^{2}) floatplane
- Power/mass: 0.0685 hp/lb (0.1126 kW/kg) landplane; 0.0625 hp/lb (0.1027 kW/kg) floatplane
