= Kraft Super Fli =

K-1 Super Fli

General information
- Type: Aerobatic sport aircraft
- National origin: United States
- Manufacturer: Homebuilt
- Designer: Phil Kraft

History
- First flight: December 1974

The Kraft K-1 Super Fli is a single-seat sport aircraft that was designed in the United States in the early 1970s and marketed for homebuilding. It is a low-wing cantilever monoplane of conventional design with fixed, tailwheel undercarriage. The wings have a wooden structure, skinned in plywood, while the fuselage and empennage are built from steel tube, the fuselage skinned in aluminium and the tail in fabric. It has a very similar design to radio controlled craft.

The Super Fli's designer, Phil Kraft, was a champion builder and flier of radio-controlled model aircraft who in 1972 decided to apply this expertise to the design of a full-size aircraft. The design therefore reflected guidelines normally applied to model aircraft, particularly in its wing design, areas, and moments. Kraft also designed a scale model of course, which was published in Model Airplane News and was later kitted by Bridi and Great Planes. Plans for the model remain available from MAN.

== Specifications ==
General characteristics

- Crew: One
- Wingspan: 24 ft 0 in (7.32 m)
- Empty weight: 980 lb (445 kg)
- Gross weight: 1,400 lb (635 kg)
- Powerplant: 1 × Lycoming IO-360-A1D , 200 hp (150 kW)

Performance

- Maximum speed: 200 mph (322 km/h, 170 kn)
- Service ceiling: 12,000 ft (3,660 m)
- Rate of climb: 3,000 ft/min (15.2 m/s)
