= Kimfly =

Slovenian aircraft manufacturer

Kimfly D.O.O.
- Company type: Družba z omejeno odgovornostjo
- Industry: Aerospace
- Founded: 1986
- Headquarters: Vodice, Vodice, Slovenia
- Products: Paragliders
- Website: www.kimfly.si

Kimfly D.O.O. is a Slovenian aircraft manufacturer based in Vodice, Vodice. The company specializes in the design and manufacture of paragliders in the form ready-to-fly aircraft, as well as rescue parachutes.

The company was founded in 1986 and started producing lightweight alpine descent gliders for the Slovenian domestic market. The early designs were all done in conjunction with Michaël Nessler.

The company is a družba z omejeno odgovornostjo, a Slovenian limited liability company.

Designs produced in the mid-2000s included the alpine descent Alpin and the intermediate River. By 2014 the company was producing the intermediate Light Wing M24 and the Mini Wing Q alpine descent wing.

== Aircraft ==
Summary of aircraft built by Kimfly:

- Kimfly Alpin
- Kimfly Light Wing M24
- Kimfly Mini Wing Q
- Kimfly River
