= Kocjan Komar =

Komar
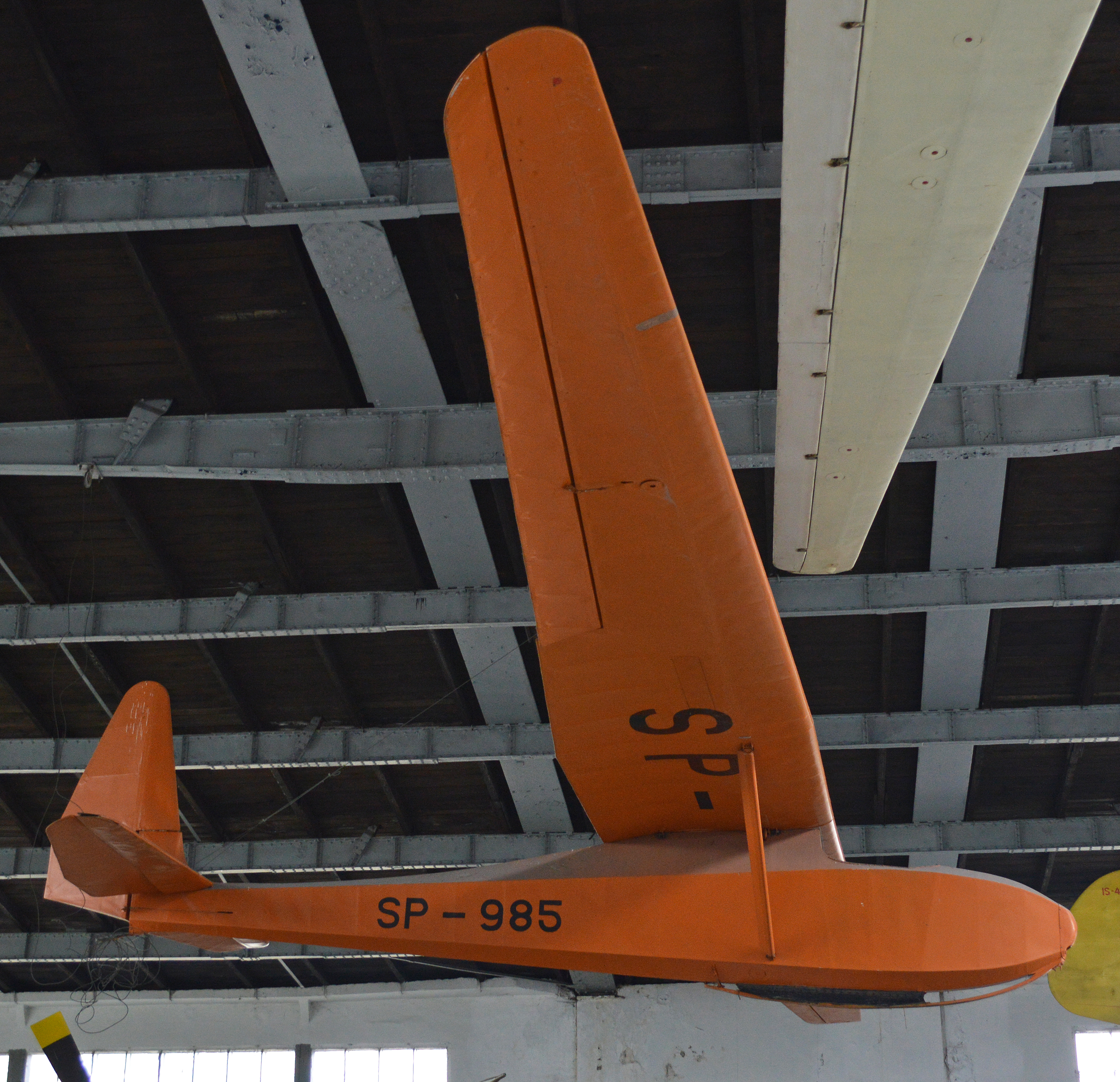
- IS-B Komar 49 in the Polish Aviation Museum, Kraków

General information
- Type: Single-seat glider
- National origin: Poland
- Designer: Antoni Kocjan
- Number built: more than 108

History
- First flight: March 1933

The single-seat Kocjan Komar (Gnat) intermediate trainer, designed in 1932, was the leading and most produced sailplane in pre-war Poland. Production was resumed after World War II as the IS-B Komar and it remained in use until 1965.

== Development ==
Antoni Kocjan designed the Komar in 1932 as an intermediate trainer. Built by Warsztaty Szybowcowe (WS) (Glider Workshops), the prototype first flew in March 1933 and an initial batch of four more followed. Its handling and cross-country performance proved excellent and WS moved to serial production, with sixty more completed before the German invasion in 1939, along with another twenty by SWS at Bielsko and unknown numbers built under WS licences in Bulgaria, Estonia, Finland, Palestine and Yugoslavia.

Some early structural failures were traced to a maximum diving speed of only 90 km/h (56 mph; 49 kn), easily exceeded in cloud, so in 1937 Kocjan responded with the strengthened and slightly heavier Komar Bis which also included a cockpit better equipped for night flights. This took over in production.

After World War II copies of the engineering drawings of the Komar were sent from Yugoslavia to Poland, where Marian Wasilewski introduced revisions that stiffened the structure, provided an elevator in place of its earlier all-flying tail, improved the ailerons and provided a stronger landing skid. Twenty-three IS-B Komars were built.

== Design ==
The Komar was a wooden sailplane. Its high wing had a rectangular plan central section occupying about 40% of the span and double-tapered outer panels with narrow tips. It was built around a single box spar and internal, oblique drag struts near the fuselage. Plywood covering ahead of the spar and around the leading edge formed a torsion resistant D-box. The ply covering extended to the drag struts; the rest of the wing was fabric covered. On each side a strut from the lower fuselage longeron to the spar braced the wing externally. Long ailerons occupied the whole trailing edge of each outer panel.

Its fuselage was hexagonal in section, with deep sides. Its single seat cockpit usually had only a windscreen, though at least one Komar flew with a removable cover. Immediately aft of the cockpit the wing was mounted on a raised, streamlined pylon which fell away behind to a slender rear fuselage. A tall, balanced rudder was mounted on a brief, ply fin. The pre-war aircraft had an all-flying tail mounted on top of the fuselage; both the rear control surfaces had, like the wing, ply-covered leading edges but fabric covering elsewhere.

The Komar landed on a central, sprung skid and a tailskid.

== Operational history ==
Pre-war

The Komar could exploit even weak thermals and set a number of duration records. Most of these were national but one was a women's world record: Wanda Modlibowska flew for 24 hr 14 min in May 1937. Another outstanding flight, the first ever long-distance flight by a sailplane over water, took place on 21 September 1937 between Tallinn in Estonia to Helsinki in Finland, with Vunn flying an Estonian-built Komar. Yugoslav-built Komars took part in international contests, including the prestigious 1937 Rhön contest.

Post-war

On 19–20 October 1949 Stanisław Wielgus, flying "Komar 48" SP-732, established a world record for duration, with a flight lasting 35 hrs 14 min. Komars continued flying with clubs up to 1965.

== Variants ==
Kocjan Komar
First flown 1933.

Kocjan Komar Bis
Strengthened, flown 1937. A total 85 examples, including both variants and the prototype, were built in pre-war Poland.

IS-B Komar 48
Post-war model with increased stiffness, elevators instead of all-moving tail, revised ailerons and strengthened landing skid. Production from July 1948, first flown 16 January 1949. 5 built.

IS-B Komar 49
Production model for 1949 with airbrakes. 18 built, production ended early 1950.

== Aircraft on display ==
- IS-B Komar (SP-985), Polish Aviation Museum, Kraków

== Specifications (Komar bis) ==
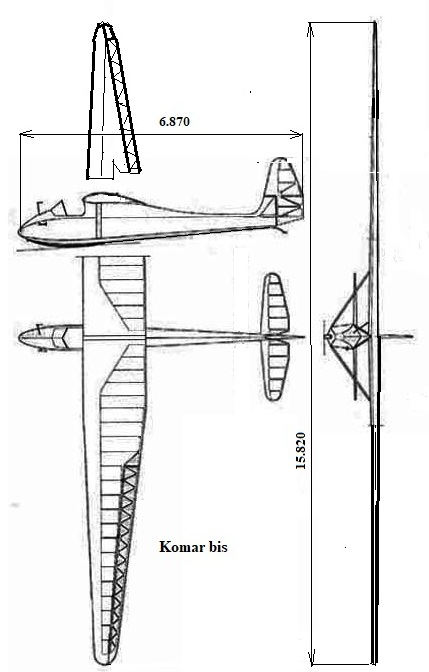

Data from j2mcPlaneurs, Kocjan Kumar bis

General characteristics

- Crew: One
- Length: 6.87 m (22 ft 6 in)
- Wingspan: 15.82 m (51 ft 11 in)
- Height: 1.8 m (5 ft 11 in)
- Wing area: 17.4 m^{2} (187 sq ft)
- Aspect ratio: 14.4
- Airfoil: Göttingen Gö 535 at root, with Gö 549 tip.
- Empty weight: 130 kg (287 lb)
- Gross weight: 210 kg (463 lb)

Performance

- Maximum speed: 140 km/h (87 mph, 76 kn)
- Stall speed: 47 km/h (29 mph, 25 kn) minimum speed
- Maximum glide ratio: best 20 at 50 km/h (31 mph; 27 kn)
- Rate of sink: 0.68 m/s (134 ft/min) at 55 km/h (34 mph; 30 kn)

== See also ==
Related lists

- List of gliders
