= WS Czajka =

Polish secondary training glider

Czajka
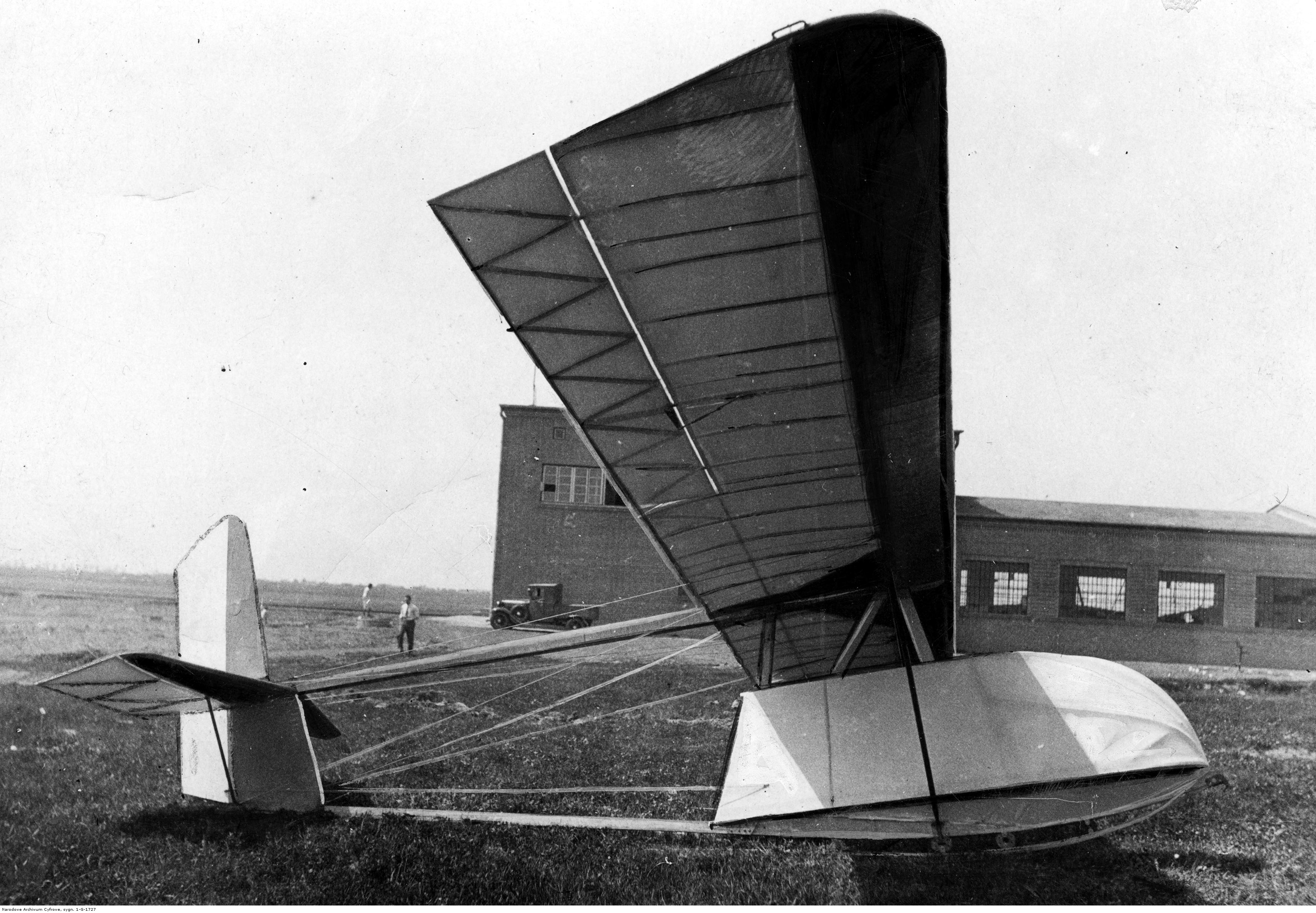
- Czajka II

General information
- Type: Secondary training glider
- National origin: Poland
- Manufacturer: Warsztaty Szybowcowe
- Designer: Antoni Kocjan
- Primary user: Poland
- Number built: more than 160

History
- First flight: 31 April 1931

The Czajka (transl. Lapwing) or Kocjan Czajka after its designer was a Polish secondary training glider which was in continuous production from 1931 to the start of World War II. More than 160 were completed in Warsztaty Szybowcowe in Warsaw.

== Design and development ==
Antoni Kocjan designed the Czajka 1931 at Aviation Section workshops of Mechanic Students' Club of Warsaw University of Technology (KMSPW) at Okęcie near Warsaw. It was intended to provide flight experience at a level between those of the low performing but easy to fly basic trainers and of the high performance cross-country sailplanes. The three prototypes ordered by the government were built here and the first flew on 31 April 1931. These prototypes demonstrated excellent flight characteristics and were popular with their pilots. Eighteen Czajkas in total were built at Okęcie. In 1932, the workshops were separated as Warsztaty Szybowcowe (Glider Workshops) in Warsaw, which undertook further production.

The Czajka was a single-seat, high wing, open frame (uncovered flat girder fuselage) glider. The two-part wing was rectangular in plan apart from blunted, angled tips. Each part was built around a single spar placed well forward, with plywood covering around the leading edge, forming a D-box, and forward of an angled internal drag strut which ran back from the spar to the upper fuselage longeron near the trailing edge. Behind the spar and drag strut the wing was fabric covered. It was mounted on the upper longeron, with a longitudinal N-strut to the lower longeron from the spar and drag strut, and braced on each side with a single, short steel-tube from the lower longeron to the spar at about 25% span. Trapezoidal, largely constant-chord ailerons occupied more than half the span.

The fuselage was extremely simple, with two longerons gently converging rearwards and vertically joined by the forward N-strut, the rudder post and wire bracing from the upper and lower wing spar bracing points. There were four major Czajka variants, which mostly differed in improved accommodation for the pilot. The first prototype, the first Czajka I, had a totally exposed seat on the lower longeron, its back attached to the forward member of the N-strut. On the second prototype, the first Czajka II, the seat was enclosed in a simple, removable fabric-covered nacelle which tapered in plan back to the rear N-strut member. The last prototype, the Czajka III, had a 350 mm (13.8 in) shorter fuselage as well as a span reduced by 1.89 m (6 ft 2 in) and reverted to the exposed seat. The later, 1936, Czajka bis had a ply-covered nacelle as well as a frame strengthened with an additional, vertical tube member at about mid-fuselage. Most produced variants were Czajka II and Czajka-bis.

The tail of the Czajka was conventional and unchanged between the variants. A narrow ply-covered triangular tailplane, mounted on top of the upper longeron and strut-braced to the lower longeron, carried fabric-covered elevators with a gap for rudder movement. The narrow fin was also triangular and, like the slightly tapered, nearly rectangular rudder, reached down to the lower longeron.

The Czajka landed on a rubber-sprung skid mounted on the lower longeron and a tailskid at the foot of the rudder post.

== Operational history ==
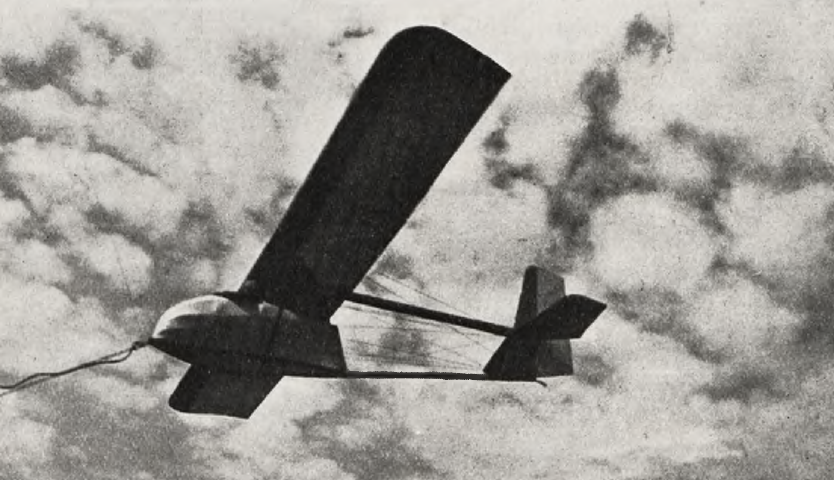
Czajka II

In the summer of 1931, only a few months after the type's first flight, the three Czajkas joined the Lwów students on their fifth annual gliding expedition to Bezmiechowa. During the year Czajkas set three new Polish duration records, the best lasting 12 min 50 sec, as well as setting the first Polish duration record flown by a woman. On 20 September 1932 one set a new national height gained record of 420 m (1,380 ft).

The Czajka contributed to the development of gliding in Poland in other ways. In April 1935 a Czajka II was used in the first winch-launching in the country. There were also international links: the distinguished glider pilot, Slovenian Boris Cijan gained his C certificate in a Czajka at Bezmiechowa and the type took part in some international events.

Orders for the Czajka came from the government, from LOPP and from individual gliding clubs and production, begun in 1931, only ended with the German invasion of Poland in September 1939. Several Polish factories built them as well as club workshops and there were uncompleted airframes at the time of the invasion, so the total number of completed Polish Czajkas, estimated at 160, is uncertain. In addition, production licenses had been purchased in Bulgaria, Estonia, Palestine and Yugoslavia.

== Variants ==
- Czajka I
  Exposed seat.
  Czajka II
  Canvas-covered nacelle.
  Czajka III
  Exposed seat, shorter fuselage and shorter span, lower aspect ratio wing which reduced its best glide angle.
  Czajka bis
  Ply nacelle and strengthened fuselage, flown in 1936.

== Specifications (Czajka bis) ==
Data from General J. Cynk (1971) Performance samoloty

General characteristics

- Crew: One
- Length: 6 m (19 ft 8 in)
- Wingspan: 11.3 m (37 ft 1 in)
- Wing area: 15.5 m^{2} (167 sq ft)
- Aspect ratio: 8.2
- Empty weight: 95 kg (209 lb)
- Gross weight: 170 kg (375 lb)

Performance

- Maximum speed: 169 km/h (105 mph, 91 kn)
- Maximum glide ratio: 13.5 at 53.5 km/h (33.2 mph; 28.9 kn)
- Rate of sink: 0.99 m/s (195 ft/min) minimum, at 45 km/h (28 mph; 24 kn)
- Minimum speed: 39 km/h (24 mph; 21 kn)
