= Kondor E 3 =

1918 German monoplane fighter aircraft

E 3
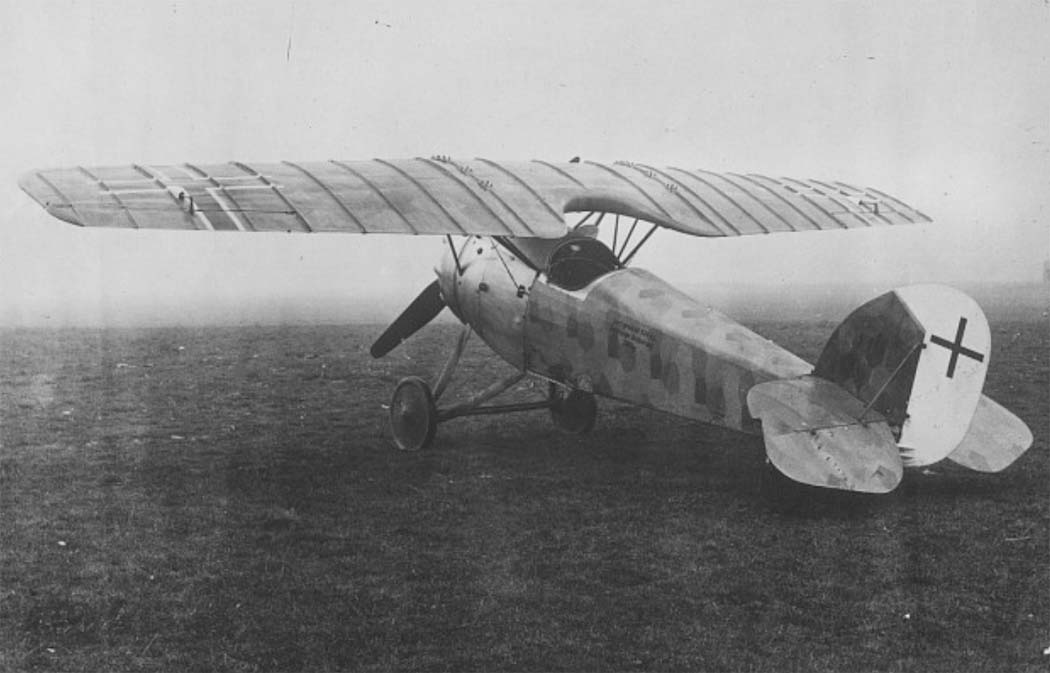
- Kondor E 3a

General information
- Type: Fighter aircraft
- National origin: Germany
- Manufacturer: Kondor Flugzeugwerke, Essen
- Designer: Walter Rethel
- Number built: c. 10

History
- First flight: August or September 1918

The Kondor E 3, sometimes erroneously known as E.III, was a German single seat, monoplane fighter aircraft designed and built close to the end of World War I. Though successful in the third D-type fighter competition at Aldershof in September 1918, only a few were produced, given the Idflieg designation of Kondor D.I.

== Design and development ==
The success of the parasol winged Fokker D.VIII in 1918 led several German aircraft makers to follow suit. The E 3 being Kondor's interpretation of the single-seat cantilever parasol monoplane fighter (E for Eindekker in this company designation), though it was later given the service designation D.I.

The E 3 had a cantilever wing with a section which was centrally thick but thinned towards the wing tips. The wing was straight tapered in plan, with an unswept leading edge, forward sweep on the trailing edge and blunt tips. This was constructed in a novel and patented way, the wing ribs protruding and the gap between them covered with strips of veneer attached by L-shaped strips. The result was a very strong structure; Kondor claimed that the slight though clearly visible rib protrusion also improved the aerodynamics. Wing and fuselage were connected on each side by two struts, one above the other, running from the mid- and upper forward fuselage to a common junction at the wing leading edge together with three forward-leaning struts from the fuselage close to the cockpit to the wing underside.

There were two E 3 variants, differing chiefly in their engines. The original E 3 had a 108 kW (145 hp) Oberursel Ur.III eleven-cylinder rotary engine and the E 3a a 149 kW (200 hp) Goebel Goe III nine-cylinder rotary. The Oberursel had a cutaway, horseshoe-type cowling, the Goebel a complete, circular one. Behind the engine, the fuselage was flat-sided, with the single open cockpit under a large cut-out in the wing's trailing edge for enhanced visibility, tapering to the tail under shallow, rounded decking. Both rudder and elevators were balanced; the rudder reached down to the keel and moved within a cut-out between the elevators as the tailplane was placed on top of the fuselage. The E 3 had a fixed, conventional undercarriage, the mainwheels on a single axle with V-strut legs to the lower fuselage and cross-wire braced.

Though the design process only began in July 1918, the aircraft was rapidly built and made its first flight before going to Adlershof for type testing in September and entering the Third D-type contest against some other new German fighters the following month. These included the Albatros D.XII and the Aviatik D.VII, both biplanes. One senior pilot there reckoned the Kondor the best machine present; it was judged as having flight characteristics only marginally less good than the recently ordered Siemens-Schuckert D.IV biplane and showed none of the high-speed parasol wing vibrations experienced with the Fokker D.VIII.

The higher powered E 3a probably flew for the first in October. It had a top speed of 200 km/h (120 mph; 110 kn) and a much improved rate of climb, reaching 5,000 m (16,000 ft) in 11 minutes.

Confusion has reigned over the Kondor fighter designations, caused by the Idflieg during the second D-type fighter competition at Aldershof, when the two Kondor D 2 prototypes were referred to as D.I and D.II, which were unofficial and fictitious. Standard Kondor practice was a Letter followed by an Arabic numeral separated by a space. This confusion was exacerbated when the production E 3 aircraft were given the official Idflieg designation Kondor D.I.

== Operational history ==
After the competition, Kondor received an order for the E 3; the numbers required are uncertain but seem to have been about 100. However, the November Armistice came with only a few, about 8–10, having been delivered.

A few E 3s were operated after the war. One E 3a was bought by the Swiss Comte Mittelholzer for aerobatic displays. Two others went to an anti-communist Dutch vigilante group, along with the E 3's designer, Walter Rethel. On arrival he produced a reconnaissance aircraft, the NAVO RK-P4/220, for the group.

== Variants ==
Kondor E 3
Company designation for the prototype and production aircraft, powered by 108 kW (145 hp) Oberursel Ur.III engines.
Kondor E 3a
A single prototype powered by a 149 kW (200 hp) Goebel Goe III engine.
Kondor D.I
The official Idflieg designation of the production E 3 aircraft, (the ONLY official use of a Roman numeral D-type designation for Kondor aircraft).

== Specifications (E 3) ==
Data from The Complete Book of Fighters

General characteristics

- Crew: One
- Length: 5.50 m (18 ft 1 in)
- Wingspan: 9.00 m (29 ft 6 in)
- Height: 2.75 m (9 ft 0 in)
- Wing area: 12.75 m^{2} (137.2 sq ft)
- Empty weight: 460 kg (1,014 lb)
- Gross weight: 640 kg (1,411 lb)
- Powerplant: 1 × Oberursel Ur.III 11-cylinder air-cooled rotary piston engine, 108 kW (145 hp)
- Propellers: 2-bladed wooden fixed-pitch propeller

Performance

- Maximum speed: 190 km/h (120 mph, 100 kn)
- Service ceiling: 6,180 m (20,280 ft)
- Time to altitude: 5,000 m (16,000 ft) in 16 minutes

== Bibliography ==
- Gray, Peter & Thetford, Owen (1987) [1970]. German Aircraft of the First World War (2nd ed.). London: Putnam. ISBN 0-85177-809-7.
- Green, William & Swanborough, Gordon (2001) [1994]. The Complete Book of Fighters: An Illustrated Encyclopedia of Every Fighter Built and Flown (Revised and Updated ed.). London: Salamander Books. ISBN 1-84065-269-1.
- Herris, Jack (2020). German Aircraft of Minor Manufacturers in WWI: A Centennial Perspective on Great War Airplanes. Gret War Aviation Centennial Series (49). Vol. 1: Alter to Korn. n.p.: Aeronaut Books. ISBN 978-1-935881-85-8.
- Wesselink, Theo & Postma, Thijs (1982). De Nederlandse vliegtuigen. Haarlem: Romem. ISBN 90-228-3792-0.
