= Kamerton-N Ratnik =

Ratnik

General information
- Type: Light autogyro
- National origin: Russia
- Manufacturer: Kamerton-N Ltd

History
- First flight: 1995

The Kamerton-N Ratnik is a 1990s Russian light autogyro designed and built by Kamerton-N Ltd of Shchyolkovo.

== Design and development ==
The Ratnik, with an enclosed glazed cabin and side-by-side configuration seating for two, was developed by Kamerton-N in partnership with the Chkalov Air Force Science and Research Institute. The Ratnik has a two-blade main rotor and is powered by a 67 hp (50 kW) Samson 760 piston engine driving a pusher propeller inside a duct ring, the rudder is also mounted inside the duct. The autogyro started flight trials in 1995.

== Specifications ==
Data from Brassey's World Aircraft & Systems Directory

General characteristics

- Crew: 2
- Length: 4.95 m (16 ft 3 in) nose to rudder
- Height: 2.5 m (8 ft 2 in) to top of duct
- Max takeoff weight: 600 kg (1,323 lb)
- Powerplant: 1 × Samson 760 piston engine, 50 kW (67 hp)
- Main rotor diameter: 9.0 m (29 ft 6 in)

Performance

- Maximum speed: 150 km/h (93 mph, 81 kn)
- Never exceed speed: 203 km/h (126 mph, 110 kn)
- Minimum control speed: 35 km/h (22 mph, 19 kn)
- Range: 250 km (160 mi, 130 nmi)
- Service ceiling: 4,000 m (13,000 ft)

== See also ==
Related lists

- List of rotorcraft
