= Koolhoven =

Aircraft manufacturer

Koolhoven factory, Waalhaven airport, Rotterdam

N.V. Koolhoven was an aircraft manufacturer based in Rotterdam, Netherlands. From its conception in 1926 to its destruction in the Blitzkrieg in May 1940, the company remained the second major Dutch aircraft manufacturer (after Fokker). Although many of its aircraft were as unsuccessful economically as they were brilliant from a design standpoint, the company managed to score several 'hits', amongst them the FK-58 single-seat monoplane fighter, the FK-50 twin-engine passenger transport, and the FK-41, built in England under licence by Desoutter.

== History ==
In 1920, aircraft designer Frederick "Frits" Koolhoven returned from England to his native Netherlands. The postwar years had not been good to him; the British Aerial Transport Company for which he was chief designer went bankrupt and all other manufacturers were struggling for survival too hard to think of hiring. The Netherlands, Koolhoven hoped, would be better. But there he found that while the Netherlands' new airline KLM was a willing taker for all the aircraft it could get, the market was almost completely dominated by Fokker. Out of other options, Koolhoven returned to his old job and worked as an automobile engineer for the Spyker automobile factory.

In 1921, his luck began to change when a group of businessmen founded the N.V. Nationale Vliegtuig Industrie ("National Aircraft Industry, Incorporated") and hired him as their chief designer. The time was still not yet ripe for a second Dutch aircraft manufacturer and, as with BAT, N.V.I. produced technically advanced designs that attracted attention from all over the world, but received virtually no orders. The company lasted only four years.

At the demise of N.V.I. Koolhoven had become sufficiently business-aware to convince several of the N.V.I. shareholders that the company would still be viable, if only he would have complete control of the operations. Enough of the shareholders agreed and even while N.V.I. was being dissolved, its assets were almost immediately taken over by a new company: N.V. Koolhoven vliegtuigen (Koolhoven aircraft, Inc.).

For its first five years, 1925 to 1930, the company managed to stay afloat by making one-off purpose-built airplanes to order, slowly branching out into the private aircraft sector and trying to break into the military market. In 1930, the company finally struck gold with the FK-41 high-wing tourist monoplane. Although N.V. Koolhoven itself only built 7 FK-41's the airplane was built under licence in England as the Desoutter Mk.I and later improved as the Mk.II.

By 1933 the military market had picked up and Koolhoven increasingly built trainers and observation aircraft for the Dutch air force as well as several other countries. By 1938, with war looming, the company's order books continued to fill as air forces from all over Europe were virtually fighting over each plane that rolled off the production line. Even France found itself buying Koolhoven FK-58 fighters as its own aircraft industry was unable to keep up with the demand from the Armée de l'Air.

In 1938, the Koolhoven factory at Waalhaven covered 8,000 square meters and had 1,200 employees. While still no match for Fokker, Koolhoven had established itself firmly as the number two manufacturer in the Netherlands.

Koolhoven's concept 100 ton flying boat c.1938, cancelled as a result of technical difficulties.

The end came on 10 May 1940. As a prelude to the German invasion of the Netherlands, the Luftwaffe set out to destroy as much as possible of the Dutch Air Force on the ground. On the morning of that day, a massive armada of German bombers appeared over Waalhaven and almost completely destroyed the airfield and its surrounding facilities. This included the Koolhoven factory and within a few hours, the company had been reduced to a pile of rubble and all drawings, models, and documentation of Koolhoven's projects were destroyed. Today, the only photographs remaining of Koolhoven's planes are newspaper clippings and private snapshots.

Frederick Koolhoven died of a stroke on 1 July 1946. His company, although without means of production, continued to exist as a holding. Over the next ten years various attempts were made to start up new projects, but apart from the construction of two prototype sailplanes nothing happened and in 1956 N.V. Koolhoven Aeroplanes closed and was liquidated.

== Aircraft ==
Apart from the Heidevogel of 1911, Koolhoven designed 59 aircraft, which he consecutively numbered FK-1 to FK-59. About half of these were design studies that were never built. Koolhoven designed projects FK-1 to FK-28 in England for Armstrong Whitworth and BAT, projects FK-29 to FK-34 for N.V.I. and projects FK-35 to FK-59 for his own company. The first 'true' Koolhoven airplane therefore would have been the FK-35. However, on formation of the N.V. Koolhoven, Frits Koolhoven took with him the design of the FK-30 "Toerist" light sportsplane originally designed for NVI, but not built. Several "Toerists" built by the new FK Koolhoven therefore constitute the earliest airplanes of that company, if not by production date, then at least by numbering.

The website of the Koolhoven foundation lists 26 Koolhoven designs, starting with the F.K.30 and then going from F.K.35 to F.K.59. It however also notes that the designs F.K.37, 38, 39 and 59 were never built, while only giving pictures of wooden models for the designs F.K.35 and F.K.36. Jane's Encyclopedia of Aviation only lists the Koolhoven designs F.K.40, 41, 42, 43, 46, 48, 49, 51, 52, 53 and 58 but mentions a F.K.50-b bomber project, which the Koolhoven foundation site doesn't.

The best-known of those designs are the F.K.41 high-wing monoplane, which was built under licence as the Desoutter Mk.II and the F.K.50 twin engine transport monoplane, two of which were used by the Swiss aircraft company Alpar. Amongst the military designs, the most successful were the Koolhoven F.K.51 biplane reconnaissance aircraft, which saw service in extensive numbers in the Dutch air force from the mid-1930s until the Second World War, the Koolhoven F.K.52 biplane which was used by the Finnish Air Force and the Koolhoven F.K.58 single-seat monoplane fighter. The latter was the plane ordered by France and flew in the Armée de l'Air during the Battle of France

A complete list of the Koolhoven aircraft and projects is given below:

- Koolhoven Heidevogel early experimental aircraft, one built, 1911
- Koolhoven F.K.30 "Toerist" (Tourist) Light high-wing sports monoplane, 1927
- Koolhoven F.K.35 Seaplane scout and fighter, available as low-wing monoplane or biplane, 1926
- Koolhoven F.K.36 Larger biplane version of the F.K.35, 1926
- Koolhoven F.K.37 Design for a 3-engined airliner for the KLM (not built)
- Koolhoven F.K.39 Various design studies for a monoplane two-seat fighter (not built)
- Koolhoven F.K.40 Airliner for 4 or 5 passengers, 1928
- Koolhoven F.K.41, High-wing monoplane cabin "sport coupe", built under licence by Desoutter in England
- Koolhoven F.K.42 High-wing open cockpit Private plane, 1929
- Koolhoven F.K.43 Three passenger cabin sportsplane/air taxi resemblant of the F.K.41, 1930
- Koolhoven F.K.44 "Koolmees" (Great Tit) Private plane resemblant of the F.K.41/F.K.43
- Koolhoven F.K.45 Biplane aerobatic plane, 1931
- Koolhoven F.K.46 Biplane trainer, 1930
- Koolhoven F.K.47 Biplane private plane/trainer, 1933
- Koolhoven F.K.48 Six passenger twin-engined airliner used by the KLM, 1934
- Koolhoven F.K.49 Twin-engine photo- and cartography aircraft, purpose built for the Dutch air force 1935
- Koolhoven F.K.49A Multi purpose aircraft, 1937
- Koolhoven F.K.50 Eight passenger twin-engined airliner, a more powerful F.K.48, used by Alpair 1935
- Koolhoven F.K.51 Military biplane trainer with open seating, 1935
- Koolhoven F.K.52 Two-seat biplane scout and fighter with enclosed cabin, 1936
- Koolhoven F.K.53 "Junior" low/mid wing light touring plane, 1936
- Koolhoven F.K.54 High-wing monoplane cabin "Executive plane" with retractable gear, 1937
- Koolhoven F.K.55 Experimental high performance fighter with contra-rotating propellers, 1936
- Koolhoven F.K.56 Low-wing monoplane two-seat advanced trainer and scout, 1937
- Koolhoven F.K.57 Twin-engined low-wing executive plane, 1938
- Koolhoven F.K.58 Modern monoplane high performance fighter, 1938
- Koolhoven F.K.59 Multi-purpose development of the F.K.52, no information available whether built, last Koolhoven design, 1940
- NVI F.K.29 Two-passenger, single-engine biplane, one built, 1923
- NVI F.K.31 Two-seat reconnaissance-fighter aircraft, 17 built, 1923
- NVI F.K.32 two-seat training biplane, 1925
- NVI F.K.33 Ten passenger, three-engined airliner, one built for KLM, 1925
- NVI F.K.34 Three-seat reconnaissance seaplane, 1925
