= Koolhoven F.K.50 =

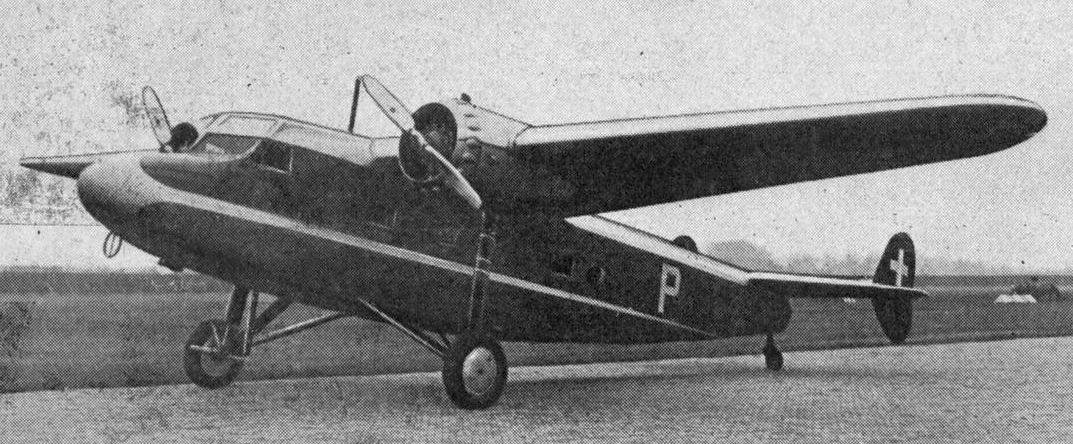

General information
- Type: Eight-passenger light transport monoplane
- Manufacturer: N.V.Koolhoven
- Designer: Frits Koolhoven
- Primary user: Swiss Alpar
- Number built: 3

History
- Introduction date: 1935
- First flight: 1935
- Retired: 1962

The Koolhoven F.K.50 was a 1930s Dutch eight-passenger light transport monoplane designed and built by Koolhoven.

== Development ==
The F.K.50 was designed to meet a requirement from the Swiss airline Swiss Alpar for a light transport capable of operating in Switzerland. The F.K.50 was a cantilever high-wing cabin monoplane with a fixed wide track tailwheel landing gear. The fuselage was of welded steel tube construction, covered with fabric. The tailplane was of similar construction. The wings were wooden construction, covered with plywood. It was powered by two Pratt & Whitney Wasp Junior T1B engines and had a conventional single fin and rudder. The first of two aircraft first flew on the 18 September 1935 and the second flew in March 1936.

A third aircraft, designated F.K.50A, was built in 1938 with a re-designed tail unit with twin vertical tail surfaces. It had a longer nose and larger mainwheels, with a higher all-up weight.

Two bomber variants, designated F.K.50B, were proposed but never built. The first was a straight conversion of the F.K.50; the second would have been powered by 830 horsepower (620 kW) Bristol Mercury VIS radial engines. It would have been operated by a crew of four and carried a 2,200 pounds (1,000 kg) bomb load.

== Operational history ==
The three aircraft operated a regular service between Swiss destinations and onwards to Lyon and Marseille and charter flights to Paris and London.

=== F.K.50 ===
HB-AMI

The first to be built, the aircraft entered service in October 1935. During World War II, the aircraft operated weekly between Berne and Croydon, United Kingdom. The aircraft was scrapped in 1947.

HB-AMO

The second to be built, the aircraft crashed on landing 25 kilometers from Basle Airport on 10 September 1937 with the loss of three lives.

=== F.K.50A ===
HB-AMA

The sole F.K.50A, the aircraft was delivered in 1938. It also operated between Berne and Croydon during World War II. In 1947, it was sold to Liberian operator Maryland Flying Services and re-registered EL-ADV, operating with them until 6 July 1962 when it crashed near Monrovia.

== Variants ==
F.K.50
Two built, single vertical tail. The second aircraft had larger engine nacelles than the first.
F.K.50A
One built, twin tail, longer nose, bigger mainwheels, Higher all-up weight.
F.K.50B
Proposed Bomber variant, not built.

== Operators ==
Switzerland

- Alpar AG

Liberia

- Maryland Flying Services

== Specifications (F.K.50) ==
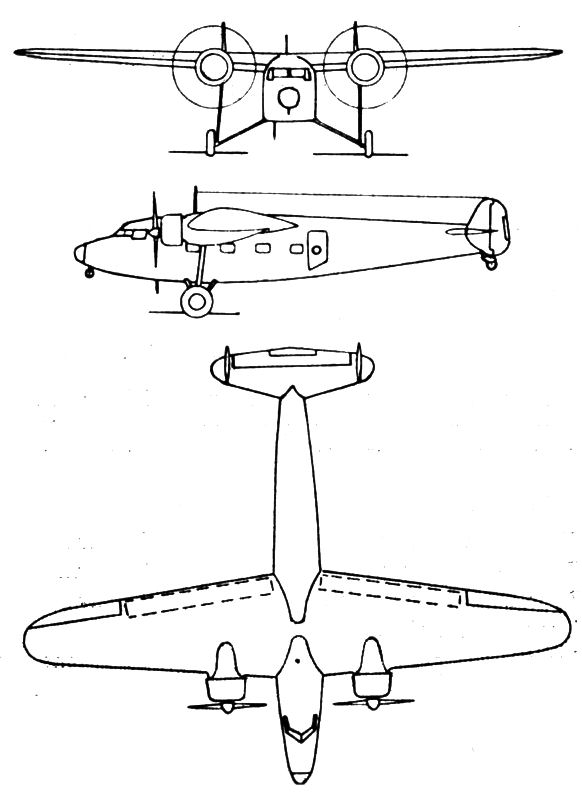
Koolhoven FK-50 3-view drawing from L'Aerophile October 1938

Data from Jane's All the World's Aircraft 1938.

General characteristics

- Crew: 2
- Capacity: 8 passengers
- Length: 14 m (45 ft 11 in)
- Wingspan: 18 m (59 ft 1 in)
- Height: 3.7 m (12 ft 2 in)
- Wing area: 44.7 m^{2} (481 sq ft)
- Empty weight: 2,730 kg (6,019 lb)
- Gross weight: 4,250 kg (9,370 lb)
- Fuel capacity: 410 kg (900 lb) fuel and oil
- Powerplant: 2 × Pratt & Whitney Wasp Junior T1B 9-cylinder air-cooled radial piston engines, 300 kW (400 hp) each
- Propellers: 2-bladed variable-pitch propellers

Performance

- Maximum speed: 265 km/h (165 mph, 143 kn) at sea level
- Cruise speed: 255 km/h (158 mph, 138 kn) at 2,500 m (8,200 ft)
- Landing speed: 95 km/h (59 mph; 51 kn)
- Range: 1,000 km (620 mi, 540 nmi)
- Service ceiling: 5,000 m (16,000 ft)
- Absolute ceiling: 5,500 m (18,000 ft)
- Absolute ceiling on one engine: 1,800 m (5,900 ft)
- Rate of climb: 4.75 m/s (935 ft/min)
- Time to altitude:

- 1,000 m (3,300 ft) in 3 minutes 12 seconds
- 2,000 m (6,600 ft) in 7 minutes 15 seconds
- 3,000 m (9,800 ft) in 12 minutes 42 seconds

- Wing loading: 95.1 kg/m^{2} (19.5 lb/sq ft)
- Power/mass: 0.15 kW/kg (0.09 hp/lb)

== Sources ==
- Taylor, Michael J. H. (1989). Jane's Encyclopedia of Aviation. London: Studio Editions.
- The Illustrated Encyclopedia of Aircraft (Part Work 1982-1985). Orbis Publishing. p. 2260.
