= Koolhoven F.K.56 =

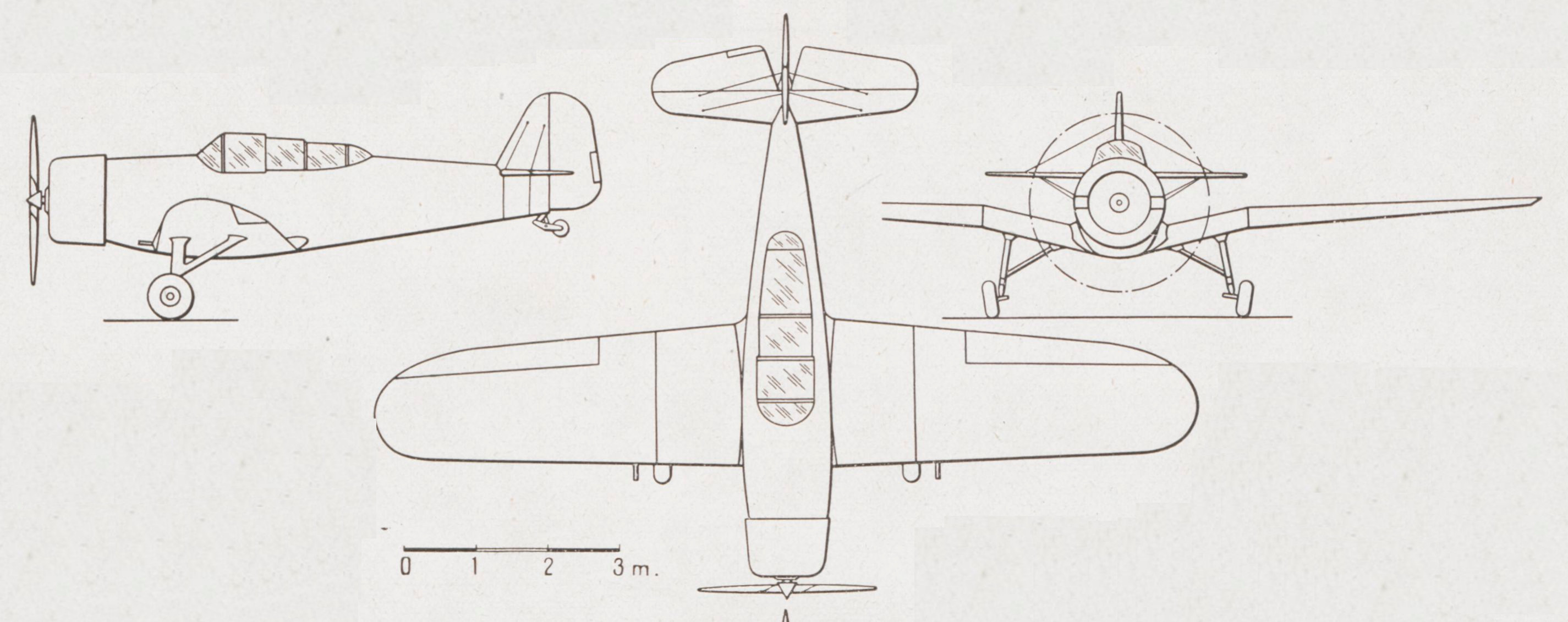
- 3-views of the F.K.56

General information
- Type: Basic training monoplane
- National origin: Netherlands
- Manufacturer: Koolhoven
- Primary user: Netherlands Army
- Number built: 31

History
- First flight: 30 June 1938

The Koolhoven F.K.56 was a 1930s Dutch basic training monoplane designed and built by Koolhoven.

== Development ==
The F.K.56 was a low-wing monoplane powered by a 450 hp (336 kW) Wright Whirlwind R-975-E3 radial piston engine. Designed as a basic trainer, the F.K.56 had two seats in tandem for the instructor and pupil under a fully enclosed canopy. The first prototype flew on 30 June 1938 and had fixed conventional landing gear and a gull wing. The second prototype had retractable landing gear and was powered by a 350 hp (260 kW) Armstrong Siddeley Cheetah X engine. Testing showed that the aircraft was too stable for use as a training aircraft, while the gull wing was too complex for mass production. A new, un-gulled, wing, based on that of the Koolhoven F.K.58 fighter was therefore designed, which was incorporated in a third prototype, which reverted to the Whirlwind engine and was fitted with dual controls. The third prototype flew on 5 December 1939.

Ten aircraft were ordered by the Netherlands Army based on the design of the third prototype. These ten, including the re-worked first and third prototypes, were all delivered before the German invasion of the Netherlands in May 1940.

Earlier in February 1940 the Belgians had ordered twenty F.K.56 basic trainers and seven had been delivered before the rest were destroyed in an air raid on the Waalhaven factory.

== Operators ==
Belgium

- Belgian Air Force

Netherlands

== Specifications ==
Data from

General characteristics

- Crew: 2
- Length: 7.85 m (25 ft 9 in)
- Wingspan: 11.50 m (37 ft 9 in)
- Height: 2.30 m (7 ft 7 in)
- Wing area: 20 m^{2} (220 sq ft)
- Empty weight: 1,058 kg (2,332 lb)
- Max takeoff weight: 1,600 kg (3,527 lb)
- Powerplant: 1 × Wright Whirlwind R-975-E3 Radial piston engine, 336 kW (451 hp)

Performance

- Maximum speed: 300 km/h (190 mph, 160 kn) at a height of 500m (1640 ft)
- Range: 800 km (500 mi, 430 nmi)
- Service ceiling: 7,300 m (24,000 ft)
