= Koolhoven F.K.48 =

F.K.48
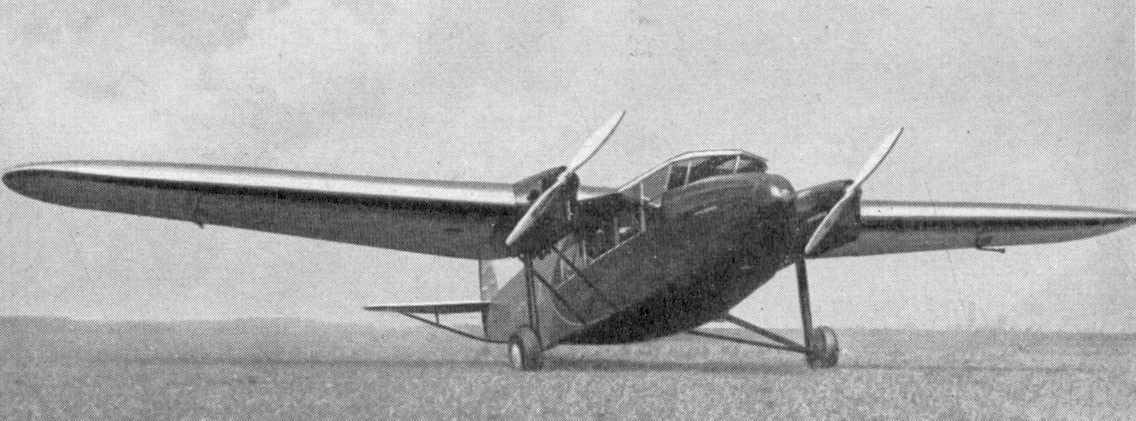

General information
- Type: Airliner
- National origin: Netherlands
- Manufacturer: Koolhoven
- Designer: Frederick Koolhoven
- Primary user: KLM
- Number built: 1

History
- First flight: 24 May 1934

The Koolhoven F.K.48 was an airliner built in the Netherlands in 1934 for KLM.

== Design and development ==
The F.K.48 was a conventional, semi-cantilever high-wing monoplane, powered by two engines mounted on the wing leading edges. The undercarriage was of fixed, tailskid type with divided main units. The fuselage was of welded steel tube construction and covered in fabric, which was oval in cross-section at the nose, transitioning to a rectangular cross-section for the passenger cabin. The wings were wooden structures skinned in plywood.

The sole example built was registered PH-AJX and quickly gained the nickname Ajax. It was used by KLM on the Rotterdam-Eindhoven route until 1936, when it was retired to training and instructional duties within the airline.

== Specifications ==
Data from Flight:A Continental Feeder-Line Type.

General characteristics

- Crew: Two pilots
- Capacity: 8 passengers / 1,000 kg (2,200 lb) payload
- Length: 11.0 m (36 ft 1 in)
- Wingspan: 15.2 m (49 ft 10 in)
- Height: 2.65 m (8 ft 8 in)
- Wing area: 31.15 m^{2} (335.3 sq ft)
- Empty weight: 1,150 kg (2,535 lb)
- Gross weight: 2,150 kg (4,740 lb)
- Powerplant: 2 × de Havilland Gipsy Major 4-cylinder inverted air-cooled in-line piston engines, 97 kW (130 hp) each
- Propellers: 2-bladed fixed pitch propellers

Performance

- Maximum speed: 206 km/h (128 mph, 111 kn)
- Cruise speed: 187 km/h (116 mph, 101 kn)
- Landing speed: 95 km/h (59 mph; 51 kn)
- Range: 850 km (530 mi, 460 nmi)
- Service ceiling: 4,200 m (13,800 ft) theoretical
- Service ceiling: 3,400 m (11,200 ft)
- Rate of climb: 3 m/s (590 ft/min)
