= Koolhoven F.K.30 =

F.K.30 Toerist
- The only Koolhoven F.K. 30 ever built

General information
- Type: Sport aircraft
- National origin: Netherlands
- Manufacturer: Koolhoven
- Designer: Frederick Koolhoven
- Number built: 1

History
- First flight: 1927

The Koolhoven F.K.30 Toerist was a small sport aircraft built in the Netherlands in 1927, intended for use by aeroclubs. The fuselage carried the pilot and one passenger in tandem in a bathtub-like open cockpit. The cantilever parasol wing was mounted above and behind them, with the main wheels of the fixed undercarriage directly below the wing, at the sides of the fuselage. The engine, driving a pusher propeller, was mounted on the aircraft centerline at the aft portion of the wing. The conventional empennage was carried on a boom extending below the propeller arc. The wing, including engine, was designed so that it could be pivoted 90° while on the ground, allowing the aircraft to be stored and transported more easily.

Koolhoven had designed the F.K.30 for Nationale Vliegtuig Industrie, but when the company folded, he built it as the first product of his own company. The aircraft failed to attract the interest of buyers, however, and only the single prototype was constructed, with Koolhoven himself the only person to fly it. It was eventually sold to Clifford B. Harmon, president of the International League of Aviators, but when Harmon failed to take possession, the aircraft was scrapped.

== Specifications ==
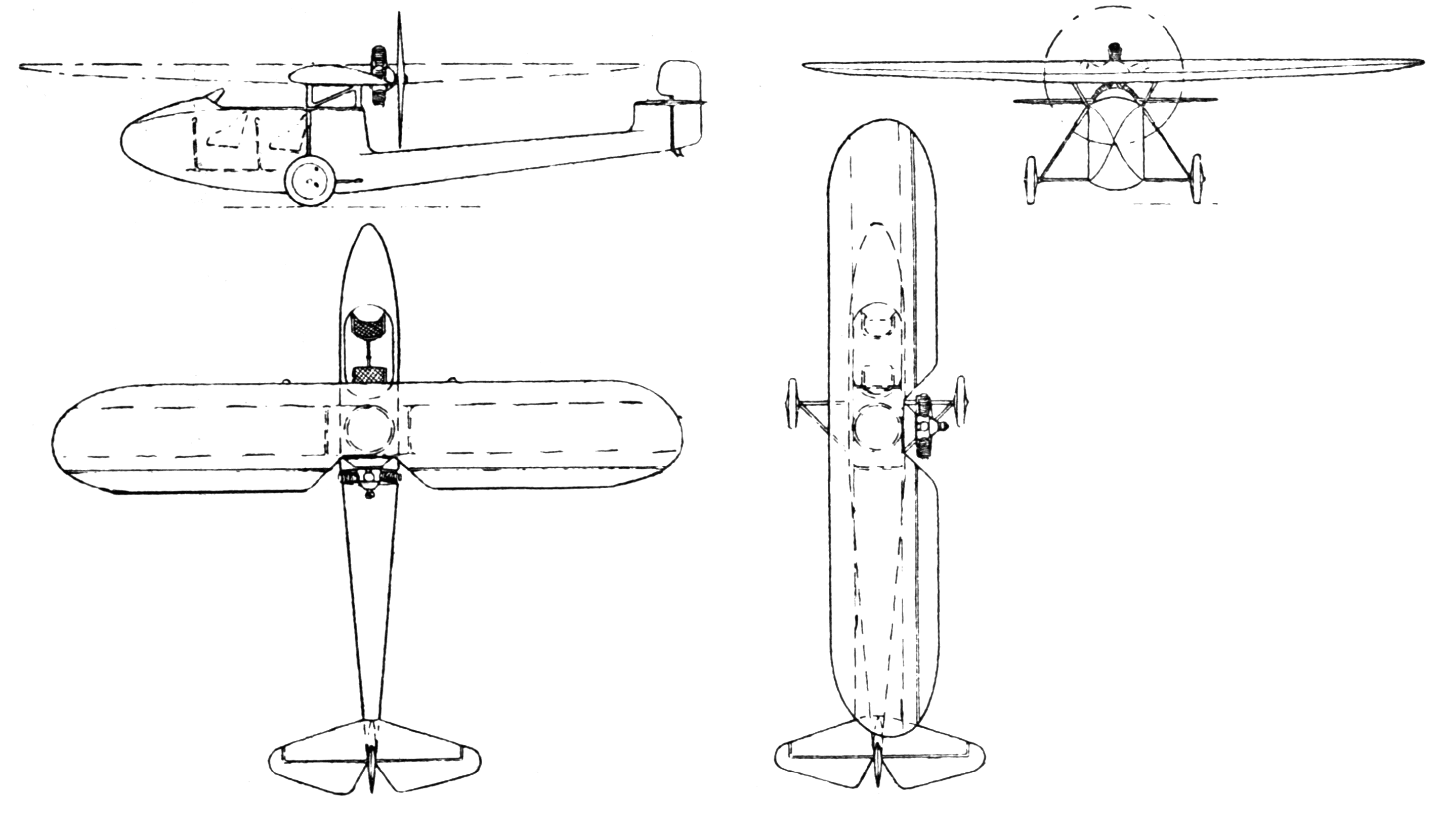
Koolhoven F.K.30 3-view drawing from L'Air March 1,1927

Data from

General characteristics

- Crew: One pilot
- Capacity: 1 passenger
- Length: 7.50 m (24 ft 7 in)
- Wingspan: 10.50 m (34 ft 5 in)
- Gross weight: 630 kg (1,390 lb)
- Powerplant: 1 × Siemens piston engine , 37 kW (50 hp)

Performance

- Maximum speed: 150 km/h (94 mph, 82 kn)
