= Koolhoven F.K.49 =

Dutch aerial survey aircraft

F.K.49
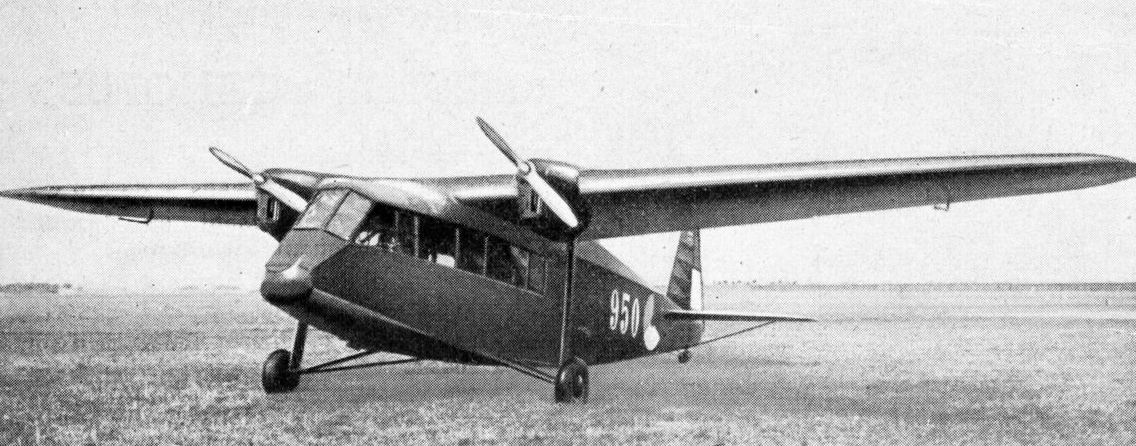

General information
- Type: Survey aircraft
- National origin: Netherlands
- Manufacturer: Koolhoven
- Designer: Frederick Koolhoven
- Primary user: Luchtvaart Afdeling
- Number built: 4, plus 3 unfinished

History
- First flight: 1935

The Koolhoven F.K.49 was a photographic survey aircraft built in the Netherlands in 1935.

== Design and development ==
The F.K.48 was a high-wing cantilever monoplane of conventional design with twin engines carried in nacelles on the leading edges. Usually fitted with fixed, tailwheel undercarriage, a floatplane version was also developed. The aircraft carried an onboard darkroom.

Three examples were purchased by the Dutch Army, but only one of these was ever delivered, the other two were destroyed before completion when the Koolhoven factory was bombed by Germany on 10 May 1940. Others were purchased in small numbers by Turkey, Hungary, and Finland.

== Operational history ==
The sole example delivered to the Dutch Army was eventually used as a general utility type, serving as an air ambulance, parachute trainer, and general transport. The Turkish F.K.49A, powered by Fairchild Ranger engines, had a short service life before the engines caught fire in flight, resulting in a fatal crash. The Finnish Coast Guard (Merivartiolaitos) ordered two examples with floats and powered by Hirth engines. The first of these was delivered via Sweden in 1940, and gave continuous engine trouble; it was withdrawn from service after only 18 hours of flight time, and the second one ordered was never delivered.

== Variants ==
- F.K.49
- F.K.49A - enlarged floatplane version with Ranger engines for Turkish Air Force

== Operators ==
Netherlands

  - Luchtvaart Afdeling (3 ordered, 1 delivered)

Finland

  - Finnish Coast Guard (2 ordered, 1 delivered)

Hungary

- HARITA Kitaati/Genel Komutanligi (Survey and Mapping Command) (1)

Turkey

- General Command of Mapping (Turkey)
- Turkish Air Force (1)

== Specifications (F.K.49) ==
Data from N.V. Koolhoven-Vliegtuigen (1934-1940., Airwar:Koolhoven FK-49

General characteristics

- Crew: 2
- Length: 11.7 m (38 ft 5 in)
- Wingspan: 16 m (52 ft 6 in)
- Height: 3 m (9 ft 10 in)
- Wing area: 35 m^{2} (380 sq ft)
- Empty weight: 1,330 kg (2,932 lb)
- Max takeoff weight: 2,120 kg (4,674 lb)
- Powerplant: 2 × de Havilland Gipsy Major 4-cylinder air-cooled inverted in-line piston engines, 97 kW (130 hp) each
- Propellers: 2-bladed fixed pitch propellers

Performance

- Maximum speed: 202 km/h (126 mph, 109 kn)
- Cruise speed: 178 km/h (111 mph, 96 kn)
- Range: 790 km (490 mi, 430 nmi)
- Service ceiling: 4,300 m (14,100 ft)
