= NVI F.K.33 =

Dutch airliner

F.K.33
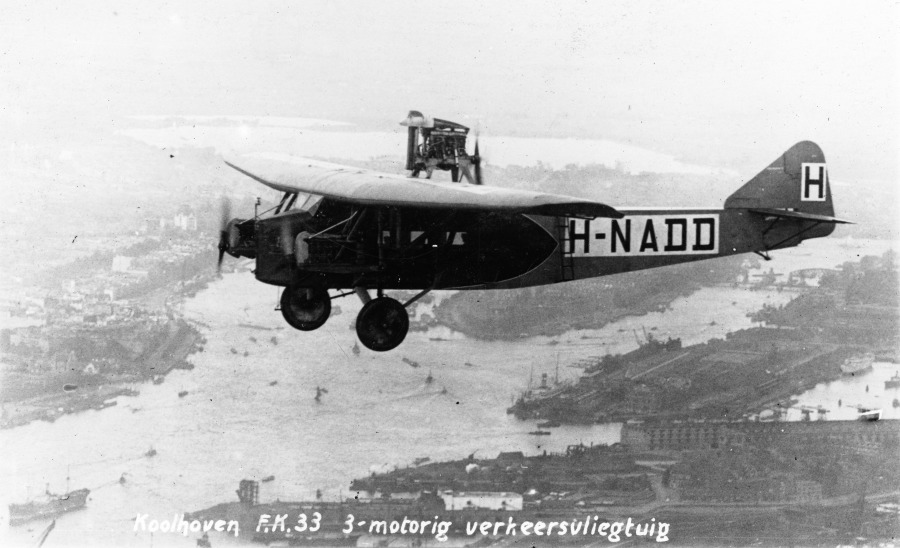

General information
- Type: Airliner
- National origin: Netherlands
- Manufacturer: Nationale Vliegtuig Industrie
- Designer: Frederick Koolhoven
- Primary user: KLM
- Number built: 1

History
- First flight: June 1925

The NVI F.K.33 was an airliner built in the Netherlands in 1925 for use by KLM for night flying.

== Design and development ==
The F.K.33 was a largely conventional high-wing, strut-braced monoplane with seating for ten passengers in an enclosed cabin. A trimotor design, the placement of its engines was unusual. While two engines were mounted among the struts that braced the wings and the main units of the undercarriage, the third engine was mounted pusher-fashion on a set of struts above the wing. The engine installation was further unorthodox in that none of the three engines were enclosed in nacelles, remaining instead fully exposed.

== Operational history ==
KLM successfully operated the type for two years on its Amsterdam-London-Paris-Malmö route, but doing an increasing amount of business with Fokker, did not purchase further aircraft from NVI. The F.K.33 was eventually sold to German airline Aero, but after two accidents within months of purchasing it, they returned it claiming poor workmanship. It was sold again in 1928, to Baumer-Aero, who replaced the Armstrong-Siddeley engines with Junkers L5s and the boarding lights with loudspeakers. In this configuration, it was flown as an advertising machine until 1931. The F.K.33 ended its days requisitioned by the Luftwaffe in 1939 as an instructional airframe.

== Specifications ==
General characteristics

- Crew: Two pilots
- Capacity: 10 passengers
- Length: 17.50 m (57 ft 5 in)
- Wingspan: 24.90 m (81 ft 8 in)
- Height: 4.75 m (15 ft 7 in)
- Wing area: 100.0 m^{2} (1,076 sq ft)
- Empty weight: 2,000 kg (4,400 lb)
- Gross weight: 6,000 kg (13,200 lb)
- Powerplant: 3 × Armstrong Siddeley Puma , 170 kW (230 hp) each

Performance

- Maximum speed: 190 km/h (120 mph, 100 kn)
- Range: 1,500 km (940 mi, 820 nmi)
- Service ceiling: 3,800 m (12,500 ft)
