= Koolhoven F.K.42 =

F.K. 42
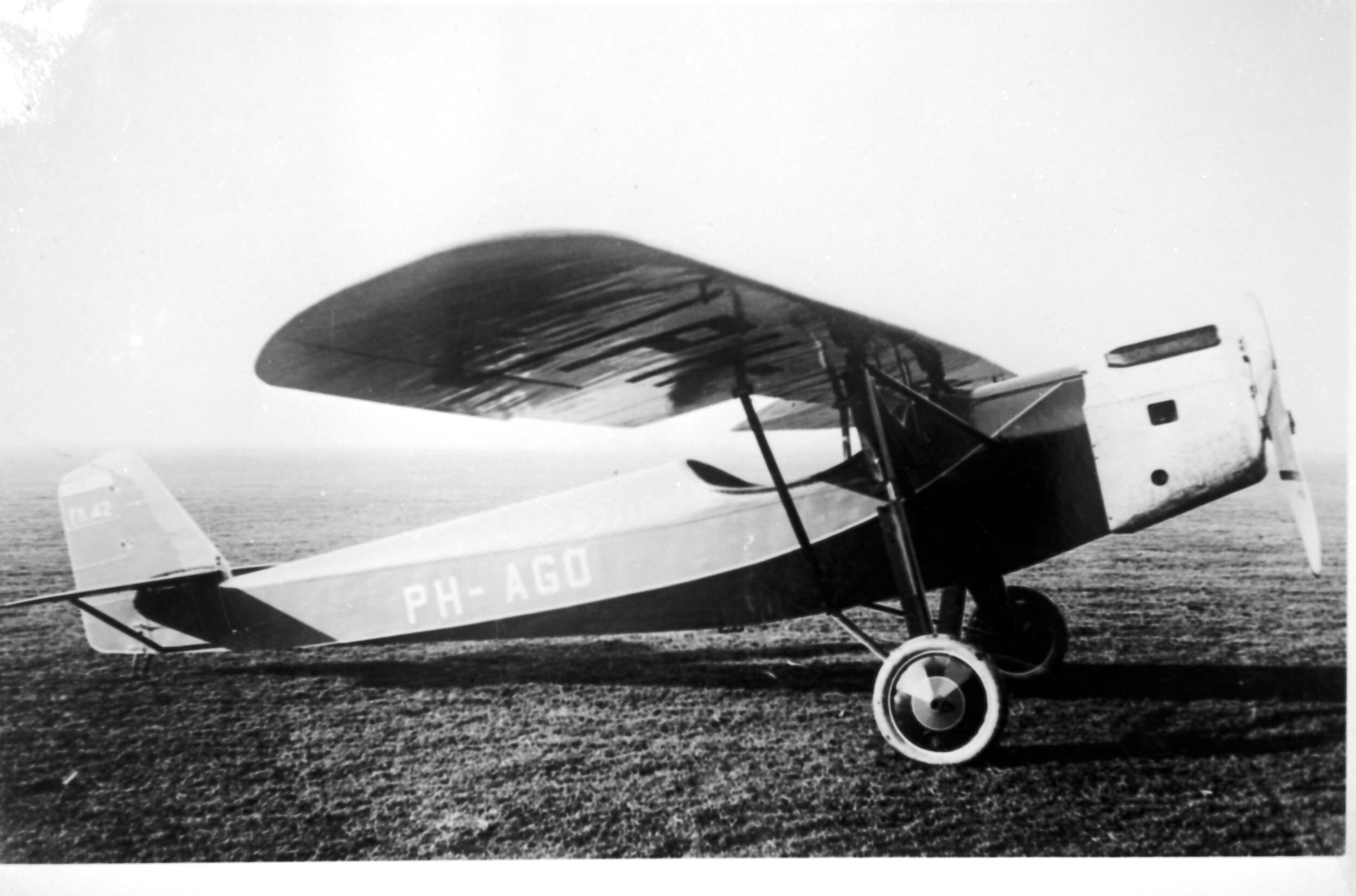

General information
- Type: trainer aircraft
- National origin: Netherlands
- Manufacturer: Koolhoven
- Number built: 1

History
- First flight: May–June 1929

The Koolhoven F.K.42 was a parasol-wing, two-seat training monoplane manufactured by Koolhoven in the Netherlands. Only one was built.

== Design ==
The Koolhoven FK.42 was designed to train civilian pilots and enable them to gain their certificates rapidly on an aircraft similar to those low performance types they were likely to fly later, rather than slowly on specialised aircraft designed to train military pilots. The Farman F.200 was built to the same end.

Its one-piece, wooden parasol wing was built around two box spars and was covered in plywood. On each side two parallel, airfoil-section struts braced the wing from the lower fuselage to the spars, each pair only about 1,200 mm (47 in) from the centreline.

The FK.42 was powered by an air-cooled, 110 hp (82 kW) Cirrus Hermes four-cylinder inline engine, mounted upright in the nose. It was enclosed in an aluminum cowling and had a fuel tank in the central wing between the spars. The fuselage, like the wings, was all-wood; spruce longerons and ply skin gave it flat sides and bottom but there was rounded upper decking. When it first appeared it had two open cockpits in tandem but quite soon the two were merged into a single cockpit. The trainer was flown solo from the rear seat; the pupil's forward position had deployable dual controls.

The empennage was conventional, with the straight-tapered tailplane mounted on top of the fuselage and braced from below with a single strut on each side. The elevators were unbalanced. The fin was triangular and the rudder, again unbalanced and straight-edged, extended down to the keel through an elevator cut-out. The FK.42 had fixed tailskid landing gear with a large track of 3.05 m (10 ft 0 in). The mainwheels were hinged on faired V-struts from the lower fuselage longerons and had long, vertical shock absorber struts to the forward spars at the top of the wing struts, strengthened there by two more short struts per side to the upper fuselage.

== Operational history ==
The date of the FK.42's first flight is not known but it was registered on 5 June 1929 in the company name. Both the FK.42 and the larger, three-seat FK.41 were at the International Light Plane Meeting held in Rotterdam between 27 and 30 June 1929, where Frederick Koolhoven certainly flew the FK.41. Koolhoven, a cautious pilot, found the new trainer reassuring to fly and he took it to several other aircraft meetings. Despite the publicity, no sales were made and only one FK.42 was built. It remained with Koolhoven until February 1932, when it was re-registered to W. de Heer at Rotterdam. It was lost in a crash on 7 July 1932.

== Specifications (FK.42) ==
Data from Les Ailes June 1930

General characteristics

- Crew: Two, instructor and pupil
- Length: 8 m (26 ft 3 in)
- Wingspan: 10.5 m (34 ft 5 in)
- Height: 2.5 m (8 ft 2 in)
- Wing area: 17 m^{2} (180 sq ft)
- Empty weight: 460 kg (1,014 lb)
- Gross weight: 780 kg (1,720 lb)
- Fuel capacity: 120 L (26 imp gal; 32 US gal)
- Powerplant: 1 × Cirrus Hermes I or II 4-cylinder, upright, air-cooled inline, 82 kW (110 hp)
- Propellers: 2-bladed

Performance

- Maximum speed: 188 km/h (117 mph, 102 kn)
- Stall speed: 70 km/h (43 mph, 38 kn)
- Endurance: 2.5 hrs
- Service ceiling: 6,000 m (20,000 ft)
- Time to altitude: 6.2 min to 1,500 m (4,900 ft)
- Wing loading: 45.9 kg/m^{2} (9.4 lb/sq ft)
