= Koolhoven F.K.40 =

Dutch airliner

F.K.40

General information
- Type: Airliner
- National origin: Netherlands
- Manufacturer: Koolhoven
- Designer: Frederick Koolhoven
- Primary user: KLM
- Number built: 1

History
- First flight: 1928

The Koolhoven F.K.40 was a small airliner built in the Netherlands in 1928 for KLM Royal Dutch Airlines. It was a conventional high-wing cantilever monoplane powered by a single engine in the nose. The fuselage was made of welded steel tube construction with a wooden wing skinned in plywood and held in place by four bolts to facilitate removal. The cabin was spacious for an aircraft of its size, and was intended to be readily reconfigured for passengers, mail, or freight. Although up to six seats could be fitted, the only F.K.40 built flew with four.

== Operational history ==
This aircraft, registered PH-AES and nicknamed Piet Haas ("Peter Hare"), was operated by KLM until it was sold into private hands in 1936. Shortly thereafter, it was sold to the Spanish Republican Air Force, and was operated as an air ambulance during the Spanish Civil War.

== Operators ==
Spain

- Spanish Republican Air Force

== Specifications ==
General characteristics

- Crew: Two pilots
- Capacity: 4-6 passengers
- Length: 11.50 m (37 ft 9 in)
- Wingspan: 14.50 m (47 ft 7 in)
- Empty weight: 1,520 kg (3,340 lb)
- Gross weight: 1,900 kg (4,180 lb)
- Powerplant: 1 × Gnome-Rhone Titan , 170 kW (230 hp)

Performance

- Maximum speed: 185 km/h (115 mph, 100 kn)
- Service ceiling: 3,800 m (12,500 ft)
- Rate of climb: 1.7 m/s (335 ft/min)

== See also ==
Related lists

- List of aircraft of the Spanish Republican Air Force
