= Koolhoven F.K.51 =

1930s Dutch biplane trainer

F.K.51
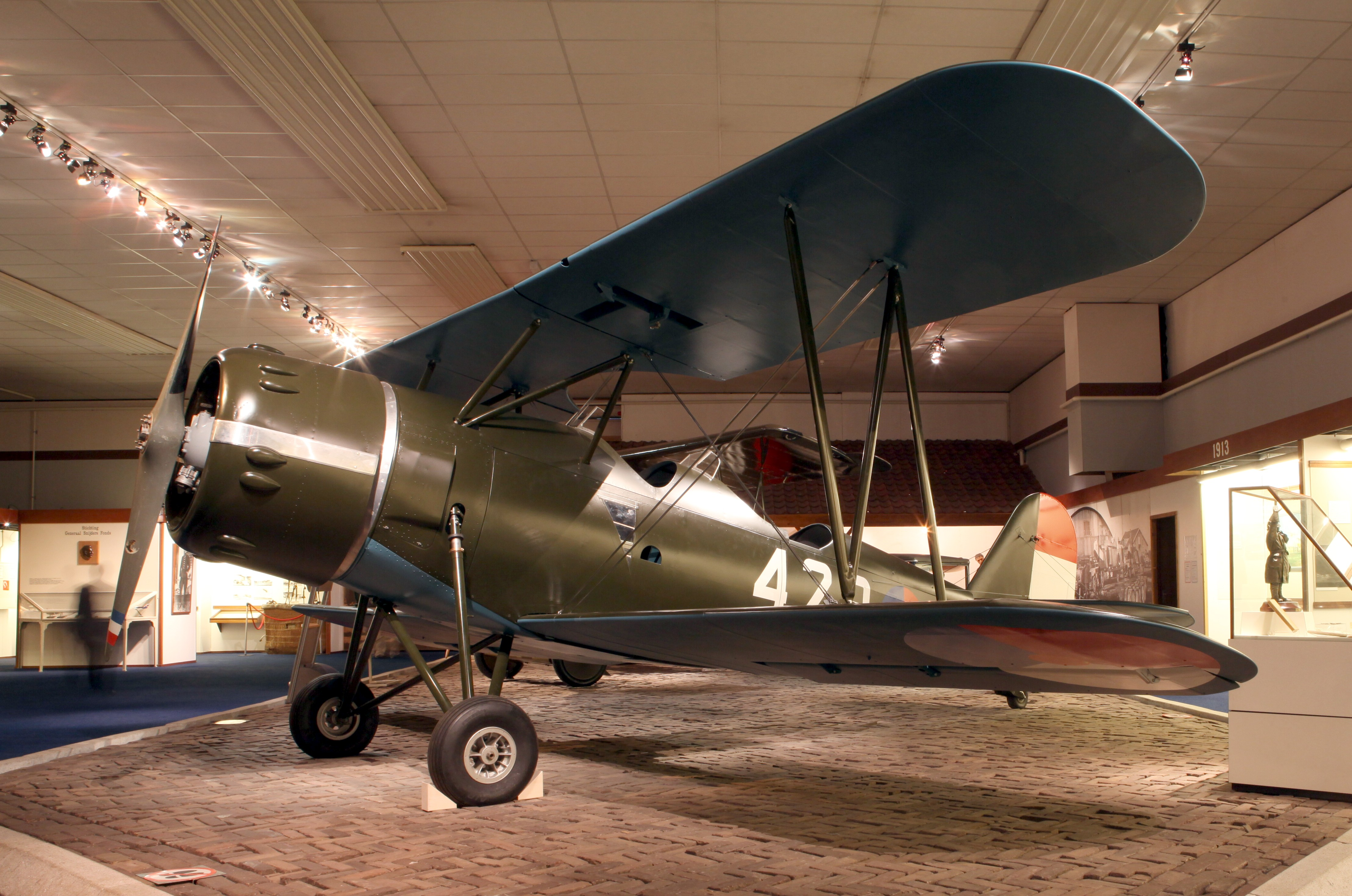
- Koolhoven F.K.51 replica at Militaire Luchtvaart Museum Soesterberg

General information
- Type: Trainer, Reconnaissance Aircraft
- Manufacturer: Koolhoven
- Primary users: Royal Netherlands Air Force Spanish Republican Air Force
- Number built: 142

History
- First flight: 1935

The Koolhoven F.K.51 was a 1930s Dutch two-seat basic training biplane built by the Koolhoven Company.

== Design and development ==
The Koolhoven F.K.51 was the winning design in a 1935 Dutch government contest for a new trainer. Designed by Frederick Koolhoven the prototype biplane trainer first flew on 25 May 1935. The aircraft was an equal-span biplane designed to use a variety of engines of 186 to 373 kW (249 to 500 hp). It was a two-seater and had a fixed tailwheel undercarriage. The Royal Netherlands Air Force (LVA) ordered 25 aircraft in 1936 and 1937, powered by a 201 kW (270 hp) Armstrong Siddeley Cheetah V radial engine. A further 29 aircraft were later ordered with 261 kW (350 hp) Armstrong Siddeley Cheetah IX engine. The Dutch Naval Aviation Service ordered 29 aircraft each powered by a 335 kW (449 hp) Pratt & Whitney radials. The Royal Dutch East Indies Army bought 38 aircraft between 1936 and 1938 each powered by a 313 kW (420 hp) Wright Whirlwind. The Spanish Republican government ordered 28 F.K.51s, 11 with 298 kW (400 hp) Armstrong Siddeley Jaguar IVa radials and 17 aircraft (designated F.K.51bis) each powered by a 335 kW (449 hp) Wright R-975E Whirlwind radials. Production totaled at least 142 aircraft. Twenty-four fuselages of the F.K.51 were assembled at Aviolanda.

== Operational history ==
While the majority of F.K.51s were employed as elementary trainers within the Netherlands or in reconnaissance roles by the Royal Netherlands Air Force in the Dutch East Indies, twenty-eight were clandestinely sold to the Republican government during the Spanish Civil War, all despite a Dutch embargo on the sale of arms to either side of that conflict. Some of those arriving in Spain were used as light bombers by the Republicans in the Cantabrian region of Spain.

The F.K.51s were in active use in Royal Dutch Flight Schools during 1939–1940 in the training of young Dutch pilots.

Some LVA F.K.51s were briefly used for reconnaissance duties following the German invasion of the Netherlands in May 1940, with several F.K.51s being destroyed on the ground by attacking Luftwaffe aircraft. The Dutch Naval Aviation Service's F.K.51s were used to carry neutrality patrols from January 1940, with most being damaged or destroyed during an attack on De Kooy Airfield on 10 May.

In December 1941, the Royal Dutch East Indies Army had 27 F.K.51s available for service, and on 5 December 1941, its flying schools were shut down, allowing the F.K.51s to form two reconnaissance squadrons based on Java.

== Operators ==
Netherlands

- Dutch Naval Aviation Service
- Royal Netherlands Air Force
- Royal Dutch East Indies Army

Spain

- Spanish Air Force

Spain

- Spanish Republican Air Force

== Specifications ==
Data from TracesOfWar.nl : FK-51, Koolhoven, Jane's All the World's Aircraft 1937

General characteristics

- Crew: 2 (one observer or student, one pilot or instructor)
- Length: 7.85 m (25 ft 9 in)
- Wingspan: 9 m (29 ft 6 in)
- Height: 2.8 m (9 ft 2 in)
- Wing area: 27 m^{2} (290 sq ft)
- Empty weight: 990 kg (2,183 lb)
- Gross weight: 1,450 kg (3,197 lb)
- Max takeoff weight: 1,600 kg (3,527 lb)
- Fuel capacity: 220 L (58 US gal; 48 imp gal)
- Powerplant: 1 × Armstrong Siddeley Cheetah IX 7-cylinder, air-cooled radial piston engine, 261 kW (350 hp)
- Propellers: 2-bladed fixed-pitch propeller

Performance

- Maximum speed: 253 km/h (157 mph, 137 kn) at 2,200 m (7,200 ft)

232 km/h (144 mph; 125 kn) at sea level

- Cruise speed: 229 km/h (142 mph, 124 kn) at 2,200 m (7,200 ft)

206 km/h (128 mph; 111 kn) at sea level

- Landing speed: 84 km/h (52 mph; 45 kn)
- Range: 775 km (482 mi, 418 nmi)
- Service ceiling: 6,300 m (20,700 ft)
- Time to altitude:

- 1,000 m (3,300 ft) in 2 minutes 24 seconds
- 2,000 m (6,600 ft) in 5 minutes 12 seconds
- 3,000 m (9,800 ft) in 8 minutes 36 seconds

- Wing loading: 53.8 kg/m^{2} (11.0 lb/sq ft)
- Power/mass: 0.18 kW/kg (0.11 hp/lb)

Armament

- Guns:

- #1 to #10: no armament
- #11 to #25: one or two 7.7 mm (0.303 in) Lewis gun(s) in the wing
- #400 to #428: two 7.7 or 7.9 mm (0.303 or 0.311 in) machine guns, 1 in the wing and 1 for the observer.

Avionics
Provision for one camera

== See also ==
Related lists

- List of Interwar military aircraft
- List of aircraft of the Spanish Republican Air Force

== Bibliography ==
- Ledet, Michel (April 2002). "Le Koolhoven FK-51: un succès commercial" [The Koolhoven FK-51: A Commercial Success]. Avions: Toute l'Aéronautique et son histoire (in French). No. 109. pp. 48–54. ISSN 1243-8650.
- Ledet, Michel (May 2002). "Le Koolhoven FK-51: un succès commercial". Avions: Toute l'Aéronautique et son histoire (in French). No. 110. pp. 39–47. ISSN 1243-8650.
- Ledet, Michel (June 2002). "Le Koolhoven FK-51: un succès commercial (3)". Avions: Toute l'Aéronautique et son histoire (in French). No. 111. pp. 39–49. ISSN 1243-8650.
- Shores, Christopher; Cull, Brian; Izawa, Yasuho (1992). Bloody Shambles: Volume One: The Drift to War to the Fall of Singapore. London: Grub Street. ISBN 0-948817-50-X.
