= Koolhoven (surname) =

Koolhoven is a surname of Dutch origin. Notable people with the surname include:

- Frederick Koolhoven (1886–1946), Dutch aircraft designer
- Martin Koolhoven (born 1969), Dutch filmmaker
