= Koolhoven F.K.57 =

F.K.57

General information
- Type: Executive transport
- National origin: Netherlands
- Manufacturer: N.V. Koolhoven Vliegtuigen, Rotterdam
- Designer: Frederick Koolhoven
- Primary user: J.E.F. de Kok
- Number built: 1

History
- First flight: 20 June 1938

The Koolhoven F.K.57 was a twin-engined, gull-winged monoplane built in the Netherlands as a personal transport for the Director General of Royal Dutch Shell. Only one was made, flying chiefly in Europe in the year before World War II, but destroyed when Germany invaded the Netherlands in May 1940.

== Design and development ==
One of the first aircraft designed as a luxury tourer and aimed in part at the owners and CEOs of large companies as their personal transport was the de Havilland Dragonfly of 1936. One man who had one was J.E.F de Kok, Director General of Royal Dutch Shell, and it was registered PH-KOK after him. In 1938, seeking something faster he had Koolhoven Vliegtuigen design and build a twin-engined long range monoplane for his travels. It was designated the Koolhoven F.K.57 and used the transferred registration PH-KOK.

The F.K.57 was a gull-winged monoplane with a fixed undercarriage, twin tail and cabin for four. The section of wing inboard of the undercarriage had spars which were an integral part of the fuselage structure. Though the wing root was at the bottom of the fuselage, these inner sections had strong dihedral so that the outer parts of the wings, beyond undercarriage and engines, were at a mid-wing position. Koolhoven had used this gull wing arrangement on some earlier aircraft and claimed it combined the stability advantage of the mid wing layout, due to its low centre of gravity with the structural simplicity of the low wing layout. The wings were built up around two box spars, with plywood ribs and bakelite ply covering. The two 205 hp (153 kW) de Havilland Gipsy Six inverted inline engines were mounted at the junction of inner and outer wings in steel tube structures, below the wings but with cowlings faired into them. Twin bladed variable pitch, constant speed propellers rotated into the same direction. Short, fixed, cantilever shock absorbing undercarriage legs were mounted under each engine, normally with faired legs and spatted wheels.

The fuselage was a monocoque wooden structure, flat sided but with a rounded top running from above the cabin to the tail. The cabin seated four in two rows; the two forward seats had dual control and behind them was a carrier for food and a folding table on the starboard side. There was also a refrigerator. Behind the rear seats was a panel with sliding door access to a starboard side toilet The corresponding port-side space was a baggage compartment accessible only from outside. Entry to the cabin was via an over-wing port side door. The tail unit was a cantilever structure with the tailplane an integral part of the upper fuselage, carrying endplate fins with straight swept leading edges above the tailplane and rounded below. The fixed surfaces were plywood skinned, but rudders and the elevator were fabric covered. These control surfaces had in-flight adjustable trim tabs. The F.K.57 first flew on 20 June 1938. There were hopes of an order for a military multi-engine trainer development with a retractable undercarriage, but the Netherlands Army Air Service (LVA) bought Focke-Wulf Fw 58s instead and no more were built.

== Operational history ==
On 22 September 1938 the F.K.57 headed out from Ypenburg with de Kok on board to fly to Shell's oil interests in the Dutch East Indies and beyond. After stops at Brindisi and Baghdad, they reached Karachi on the 24 September, having covered 7,377 km (4,585 mi). The F.K.57 was wireless equipped and the news of the political crisis over Hitler's intention to annex the Czechoslovak Sudetenland, which was resolved with the Munich Agreement of 29 September 1938, was serious enough to cause them to return home, again in three days. The F.K.57 was used by de Kok for flights around Europe for the next year until the outbreak of World War II, when it was impressed into service with the LVA. It was destroyed at Ypenburg, together with many of the LVA's aircraft on the first day of the German invasion of the Netherlands, 10 May 1940.

== Specifications ==
Data from Grey 1972

General characteristics

- Crew: 1/2
- Capacity: 2/3 (4 people in all)
- Length: 9.0 m (29 ft 6 in)
- Wingspan: 13.25 m (43 ft 6 in)
- Height: 2.4 m (7 ft 10 in)
- Wing area: 23.6 m^{2} (254 sq ft)
- Empty weight: 1,380 kg (3,042 lb)
- Gross weight: 2,160 kg (4,762 lb)
- Powerplant: 2 × de Havilland Gipsy Six Series II 6-cylinder air-cooled inverted inline, 153 kW (205 hp) each

Performance

- Maximum speed: 280 km/h (170 mph, 150 kn) at sea level. All performance figures are estimates.
- Cruise speed: 260 km/h (160 mph, 140 kn) at 1,830 m (6,000 ft)
- Range: 1,400 km (870 mi, 760 nmi)
- Service ceiling: 6,000 m (20,000 ft)
- Rate of climb: 6.1 m/s (1,200 ft/min) initial rate

== Cited sources ==
- Grey, C.G. (1972). Jane's All the World's Aircraft 1938. London: David & Charles. ISBN 0-7153-5734-4.
