= Koolhoven FK.47 =

F.K.47
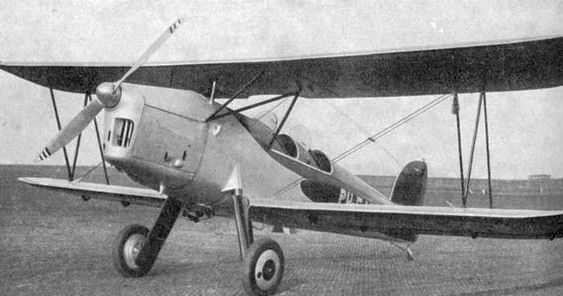

General information
- Type: Two seat tourer and sports aircraft
- National origin: Netherlands
- Manufacturer: N.V. Koolhoven Vliegtuigen
- Number built: 1

History
- First flight: c. June 1933

The Koolhoven F.K.47 was a 1930s one-off two seat biplane designed and built in the Netherlands for an individual customer as a sport and touring aircraft.

== Design and development ==
The F.K.47 was specifically built for H.L. Jonker Roelants as a sports tourer and registered in his name in June 1933. It had much in common with the early version of the Koolhoven F.K.46 sport and training aircraft, which first flew four months later. Both were two seat, single bay biplanes, with equal span, unswept wings of constant chord and strong stagger, braced with N-form struts. The upper wing of the F.K.47 was held above the fuselage primarily by a pair of short, outward leaning N-form cabane struts to the upper fuselage longerons. There was a shallow rounded cut-out in the trailing edge of this wing to enhance the upward view from the forward cockpit.

The F.K.47 was powered by a 130 hp (97 kW) de Havilland Gipsy Major air-cooled inverted inline engine, driving a two blade propeller. The fuselage had a rounded decking with the forward cockpit placed under the upper wing trailing edge and the aft one just behind the lower wing edge. Both cockpits were open. Aft, the fin was quadrant-shaped with a vertical rudder. The undercarriage was conventional, with the mainwheels on cantilever tube, faired legs, assisted by a tailwheel.

== Operational history ==
At least some of Roelant's flights around Europe in the sole F.K.47, PH-EJR, ended badly. An early trip to the Dolomites in July 1933 ended prematurely with engine failure over Germany. Three years later, flying between Rotterdam and Paris but off course he landed at a military field where tensions had been raised by the recent German occupation of the Rhineland. He and his aircraft were briefly held under guard. He continued to use it until 1939 when it was destroyed.

== Specifications ==
Data from Wesselink

General characteristics

- Capacity: Two
- Length: 6.80 m (22 ft 4 in)
- Wingspan: 8.0 m (26 ft 3 in)
- Wing area: 20.0 m^{2} (215 sq ft)
- Empty weight: 499 kg (1,100 lb)
- Gross weight: 830 kg (1,830 lb)
- Powerplant: 1 × de Havilland Gipsy Major 4-cylinder inverted air-cooled inline, 97 kW (130 hp)
- Propellers: 2-bladed

Performance

- Maximum speed: 188 km/h (117 mph, 102 kn) at 2,000 m (6,560 ft)
