= Koolhoven F.K.53 =

F.K.53 Junior
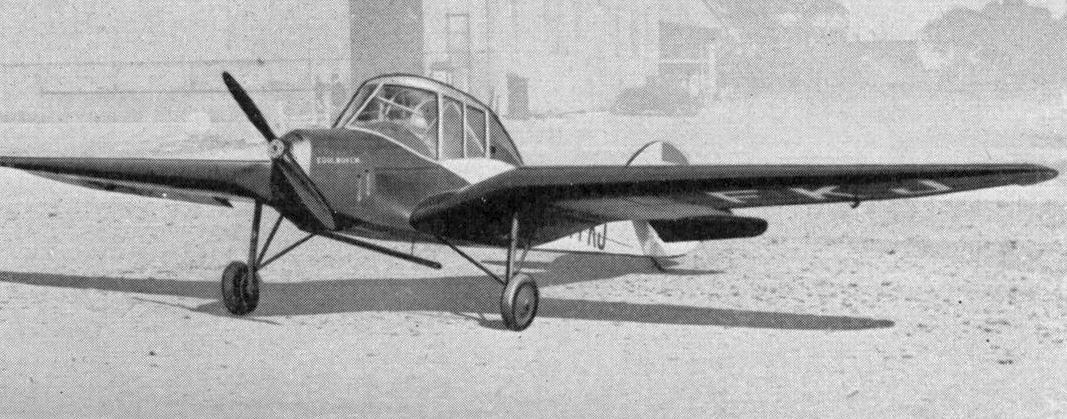

General information
- Type: Sport aircraft
- National origin: Netherlands
- Manufacturer: Koolhoven
- Designer: J. van Hattum
- Number built: 2

History
- First flight: August 1936

The Koolhoven F.K.53 Junior was a small sport aircraft built in the Netherlands in 1936. It was a low-wing cantilever monoplane of conventional design, with tandem seating for two under a long canopy. The wings had a gull shape and carried the main units of the tailwheel undercarriage. Two examples were built, and both destroyed in the German bombing of Waalhaven in May 1940. The first machine built had been purchased by the Dutch national flying school.

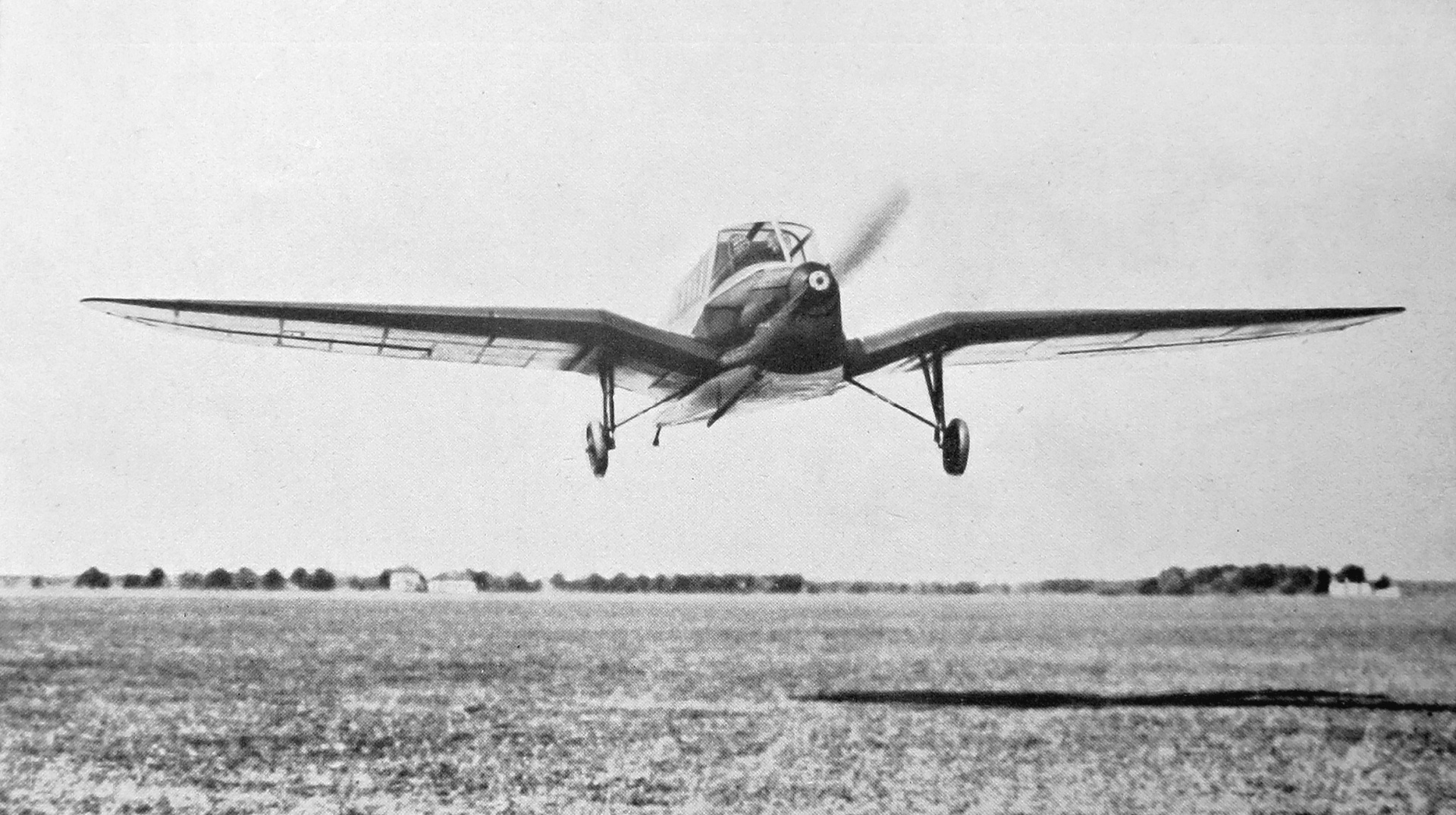
Walter Mikron and Koolhoven F.K.53 Junior (1936)

== Specifications ==
General characteristics

- Crew: One pilot
- Capacity: 1 passenger
- Length: 7.20 m (23 ft 8 in)
- Wingspan: 10.50 m (34 ft 5 in)
- Height: 2.05 m (6 ft 8 in)
- Wing area: 15.5 m^{2} (167 sq ft)
- Empty weight: 310 kg (680 lb)
- Gross weight: 540 kg (1,190 lb)
- Powerplant: 1 × Walter Mikron , 46 kW (62 hp)

Performance

- Maximum speed: 150 km/h (94 mph, 82 kn)
- Range: 370 km (230 mi, 200 nmi)
- Service ceiling: 3,200 m (10,500 ft)
