= Koolhoven F.K.43 =

Type of aircraft

F.K.43
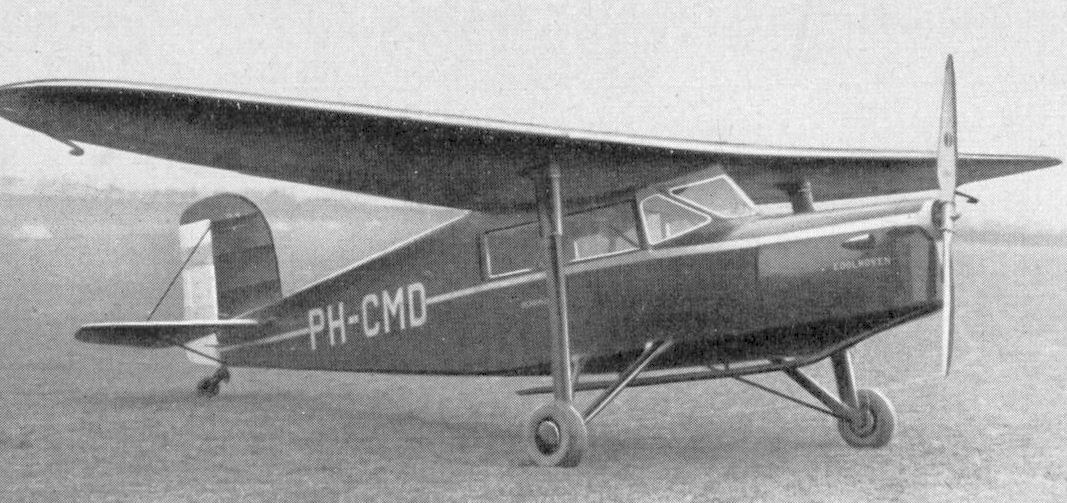

General information
- Type: passenger transport
- Manufacturer: Koolhoven
- Primary users: KLM Royal Netherlands Air Force; Royal Air Force
- Number built: 20

History
- Introduction date: 1931
- First flight: 1931
- Developed from: Koolhoven F.K.41

The Koolhoven F.K.43 was a small four-seat, single-engined monoplane passenger aircraft manufactured by Koolhoven in the Netherlands. It was a direct successor of the F.K.41.

It was a quite successful design with good flying qualities. KLM purchased twelve aircraft and used it as a flying taxi and for pilot training. Two of these were built by Aviolanda.

At the outbreak of World War II, four F.K.43s were requisitioned by the Royal Netherlands Air Force. One of these escaped destruction by flying to England, where it was taken into use as a liaison aircraft by the Royal Air Force.

After the war another eight aircraft, powered by a 165 hp (123 kW) Armstrong Siddeley Genet Major radial engines were manufactured by Fokker (the aircraft were called "Fokhovens"). Only one of these heavily modified aircraft has survived until today.

== Specifications (F.K.43) ==
Data from Koolhoven FK-43: Le Dernier Survivant

General characteristics

- Crew: 1
- Capacity: 2–3 passengers
- Length: 8.30 m (27 ft 3 in)
- Wingspan: 11.0 m (36 ft 1 in)
- Wing area: 17 m^{2} (180 sq ft)
- Empty weight: 605 kg (1,334 lb)
- Gross weight: 1,100 kg (2,425 lb)
- Powerplant: 1 × de Havilland Gipsy Major 4-cylinder inverted air-cooled in-line piston engine, 97 kW (130 hp)

Performance

- Maximum speed: 210 km/h (130 mph, 110 kn) at sea level
- Cruise speed: 190 km/h (120 mph, 100 kn) (80% power)
- Range: 720 km (450 mi, 390 nmi)
- Service ceiling: 4,100 m (13,500 ft)
- Rate of climb: 3.3 m/s (650 ft/min)

== See also ==
Related lists

- List of aircraft of the RAF
