= NVI F.K.32 =

Dutch trainer aircraft prototype

F.K.32
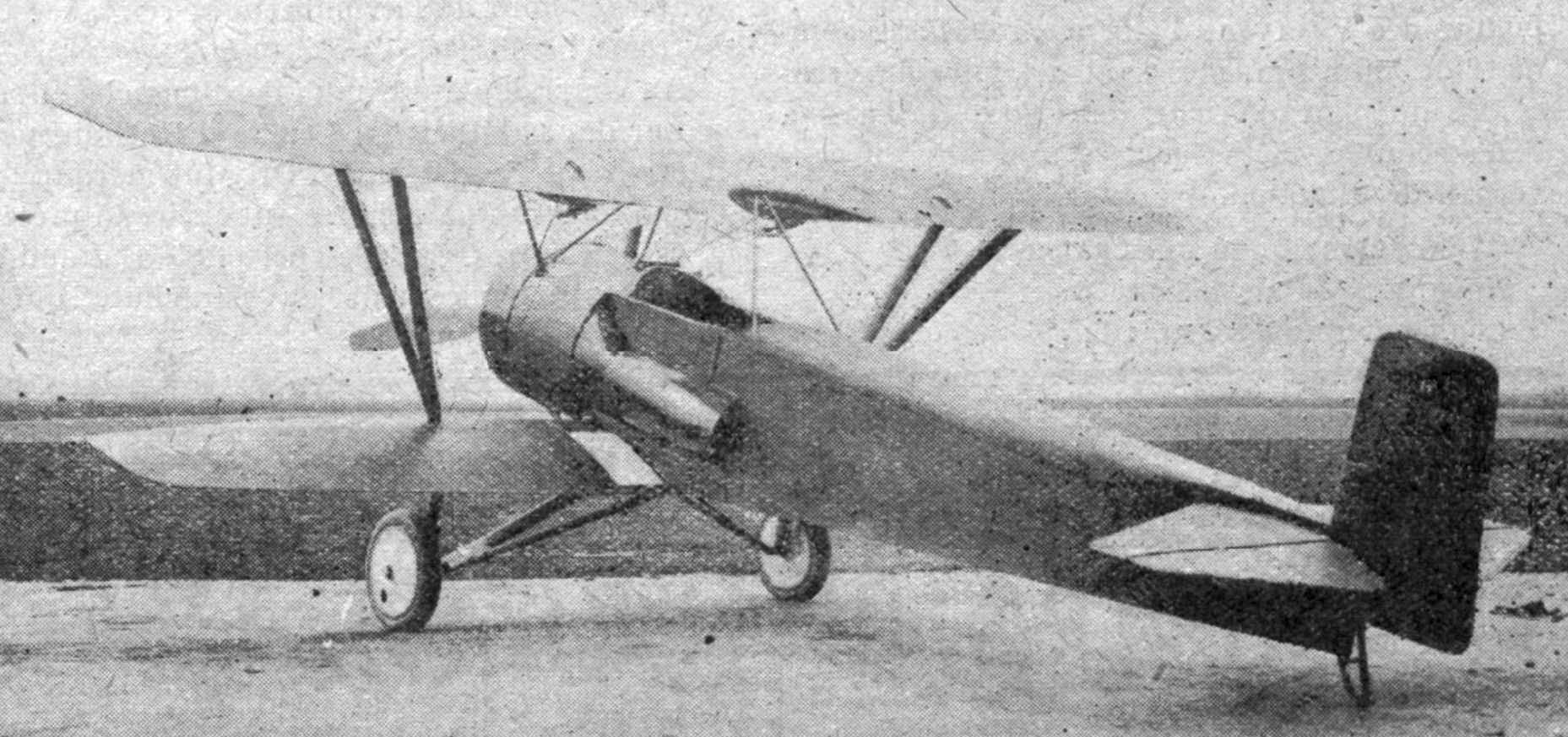

General information
- Type: Training aircraft
- National origin: Netherlands
- Manufacturer: Nationale Vliegtuig Industrie (National Aircraft Industry or NVI)
- Designer: Frederick Koolhoven

History
- First flight: 28 April 1925

The NVI F.K.32 was a tandem two-seat biplane training aircraft designed and built in the Netherlands in the mid-1920s. It did not go into service.

== Design and development ==
The F.K.32 was designed by Frederick Koolhoven as a replacement for the Avro 504Ks of the LA-KNIL, the Luchtvaartafdeling-KNIL or Aviation Service of the Dutch East India Army, who had used them since 1919. Like the 504, it was a biplane with tandem seats, powered by a rotary engine but it was a cleaner, more modern design.

The F.K.32 was an unequal span, single bay biplane, its wings were braced with strongly outward-leaning V-form interplane struts on each side, and there was a noticeable absence of flying wire. The wings were slightly tapered in plan and had rounded tips. The horizontal tail, placed on top of the fuselage was straight edged and double tapered; the vertical tail was almost rectangular.

The fuselage of the F.K.32 was flat sided with a rounded decking. Instructor and pupil sat in tandem in a single, long, open cockpit under the upper wing, which had a trailing edge cut-out for enhanced visibility. Inverted V-form struts leaned from the front and rear of the cockpit to the two wing spars to form a cabane, assisted by a transverse strut on each side from the top of the fuselage to the wing just outboard of the fuel tanks mounted on its underside. The 130 hp (97 kW) Clerget 9B rotary was cleanly cowled and drove a two blade propeller. The F.K.32 had a fixed, conventional undercarriage with each mainwheel on a V-form strut attached on the fuselage centreline. Short, vertical legs were fixed to the lower wing spar immediately below the base of the interplane struts.

== Operational history ==
The LA-KNIL held a competition in the East Indies to choose the 504 replacement. This was attended by a Fokker S.IV and a Morane-Saulnier parasol model but the F.K.32 was not there and was not even shipped to the East. In the end the LA-KNIL made no orders for a replacement and retained their Avro 504s.

== Specifications ==
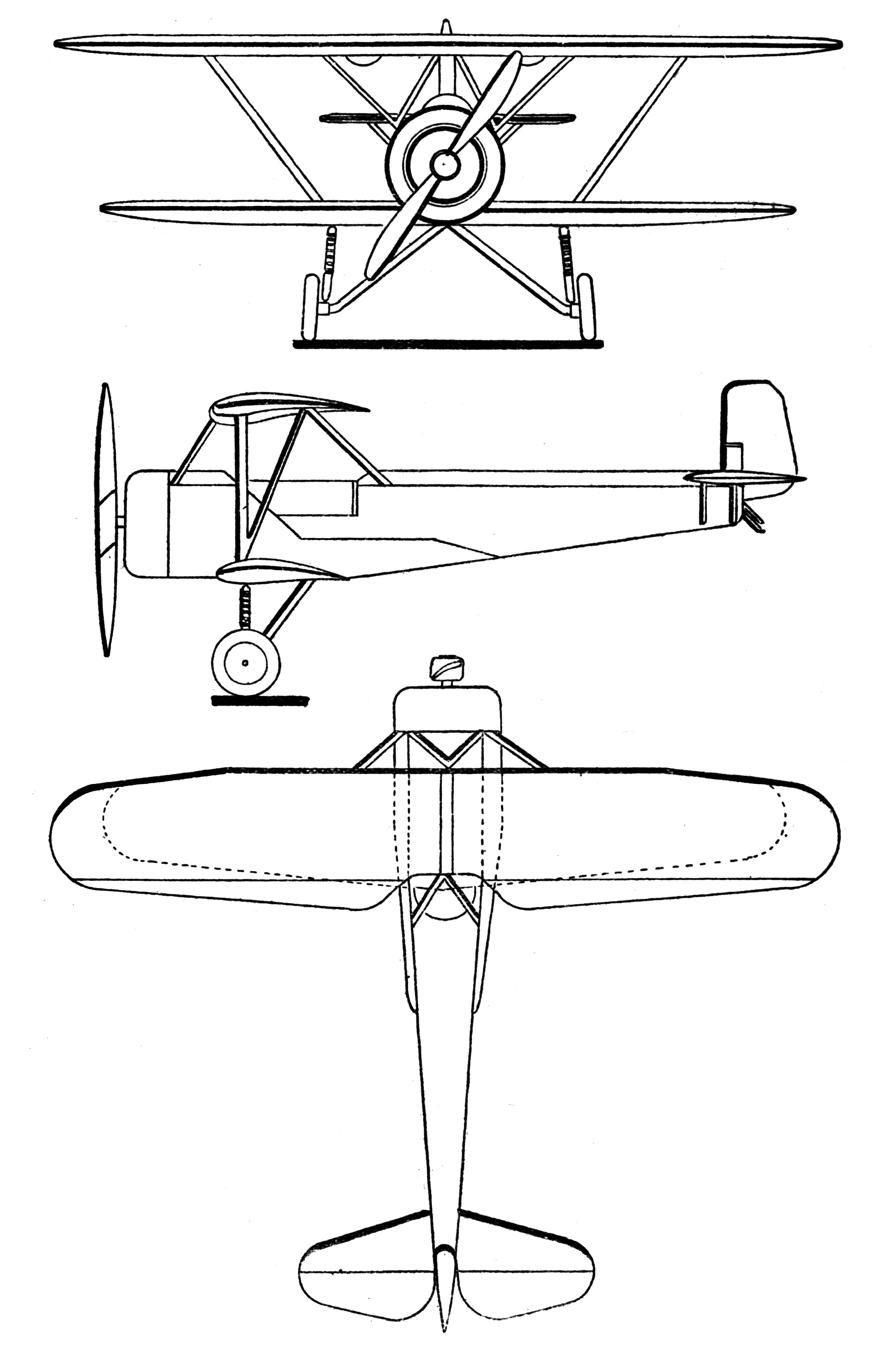
Koolhoven FK-32 3-view drawing from Les Ailes February 4,1926

Data from Wesselink

General characteristics

- Crew: Two
- Length: 7.10 m (23 ft 4 in)
- Wingspan: 8.00 m (26 ft 3 in)
- Gross weight: 870 kg (1,918 lb)
- Powerplant: 1 × Clerget 9B 9-cylinder rotary engine, 97 kW (130 hp)
- Propellers: 2-bladed

Performance

- Maximum speed: 150 km/h (93 mph, 81 kn)
