= NVI F.K.34 =

F.K.34
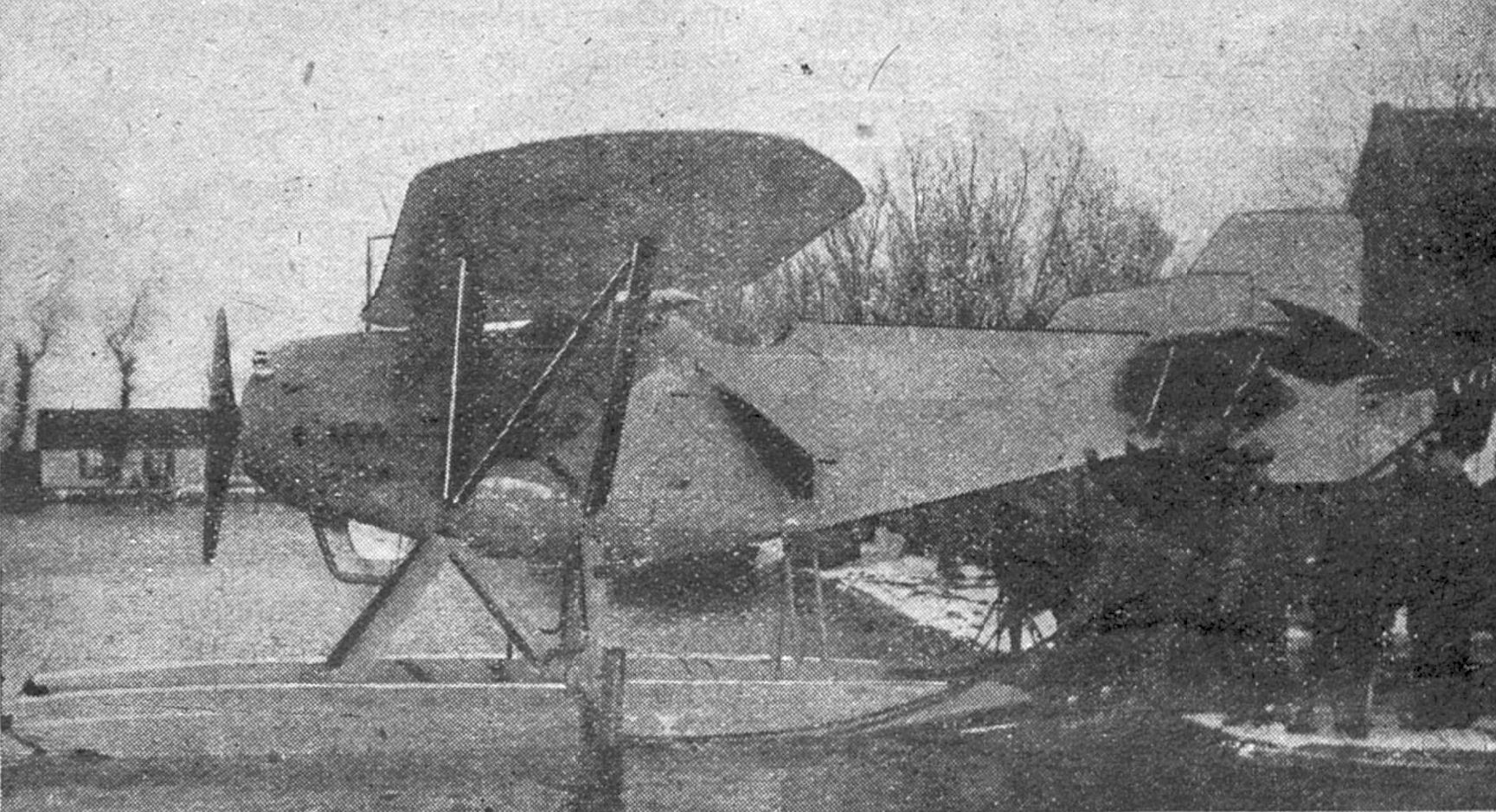

General information
- Type: Reconnaissance floatplane
- National origin: Netherlands
- Manufacturer: Nationale Vliegtuig Industrie (National Aircraft Industry or NVI)
- Designer: Frederick Koolhoven
- Number built: 1?

History
- First flight: 31 October 1925

The NVI F.K.34 was a three-seat reconnaissance floatplane built in the Netherlands in 1925 as a private venture in the hope of a Dutch Naval Aviation Service order; two accidents during testing meant that it did not go into production.

== Design and development ==
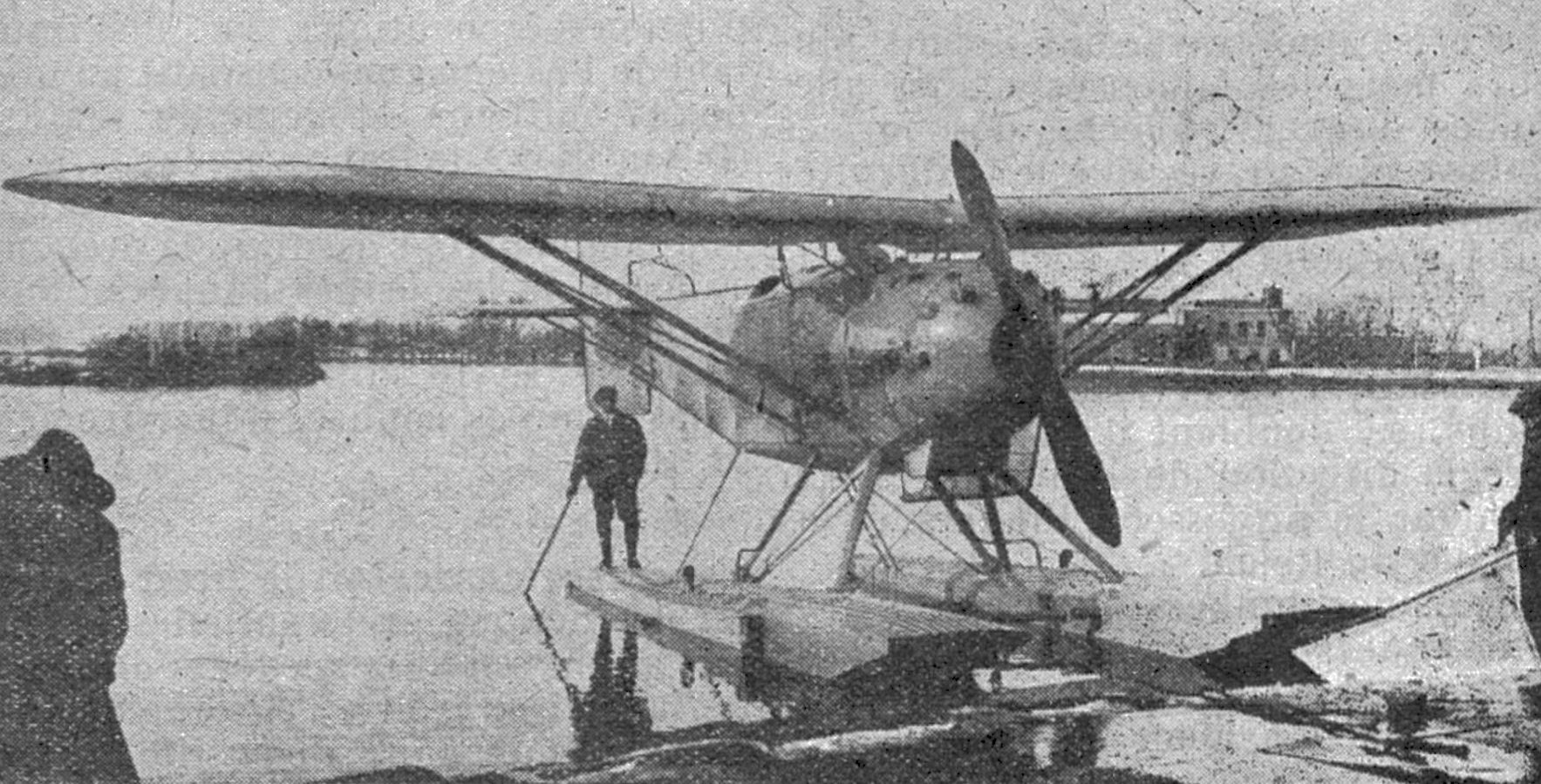
Koolhoven FK.34 photo from Les Ailes June 6, 1926

The F.K.34 was a private venture, a floatplane reconnaissance aircraft with a crew of three. It was a parasol wing monoplane with a wing that was almost constant in plan out to the ailerons where the trailing edge began to curve in towards rounded tips. The wings were braced on each side by a pair of parallel struts from the lower fuselage; these bracing struts were actually of N-form but the diagonal member was notably thinner than the others.

The fuselage was flat sided and topped but the underside sloped upwards towards the tail. Here, the tailplane was located on top of the fuselage and also braced on each side with [pairs of parallel struts; its elevators had rounded tips which served as horn balances. The rudder was rectangular and extended downwards below the bottom of the fuselage. The pilot sat in an open cockpit under the wing trailing edge where there was a rectangular cut-out for enhanced visibility. In the nose the three cylinder banks of the 520 hp (387 kW) W-12 Hispano-Suiza 12G engine were neatly enclosed in a drum and dome-like cowling. It drove a two blade propeller. The floats were flat topped, square in plan and wedge shaped in profile at the bow, tapering to the rear. They were mounted to the lower fuselage with N-form struts; two cross braces linked the pair of floats.

The first flight was made on 31 October 1925, piloted by Joop van Vloten, followed by test flights which led to several modifications. After this the FK.34 was extensively tested by the MLD (the Marine Luchtvaart Dienst or Dutch Naval Aviation Service), to whom NVI looked for an order. At one stage the sale of nine aircraft seemed possible; however there were two accidents caused by the failure of the float undercarriage and no such order was placed. The aircraft was then scrapped.

== Specifications ==
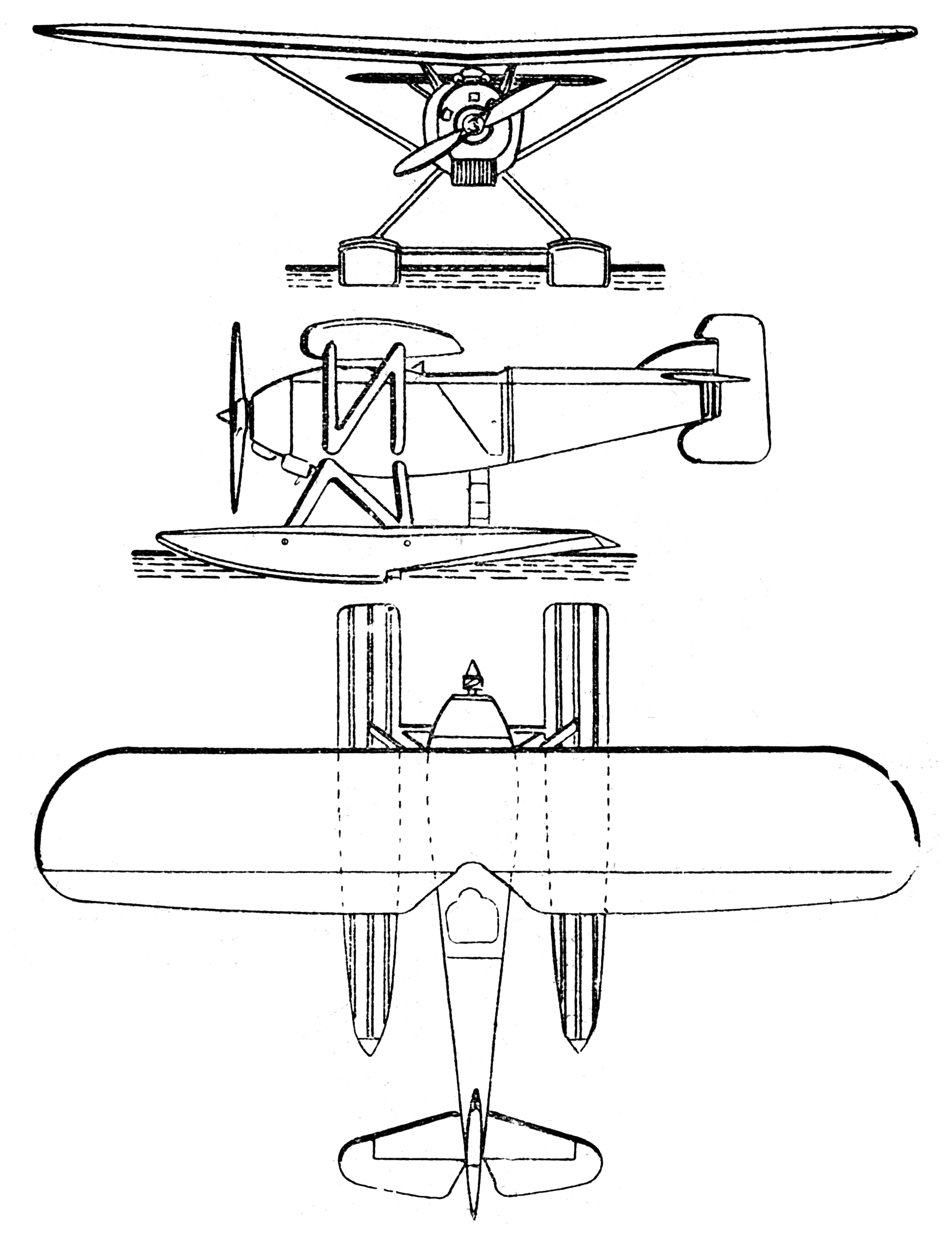
Koolhoven FK.34 3-view drawing from Les Ailes June 6, 1926

Data from Wesselink.

General characteristics

- Crew: Three
- Length: 9.30 m (30 ft 6 in)
- Wingspan: 13.00 m (42 ft 8 in)
- Gross weight: 2,500 kg (5,512 lb)
- Powerplant: 1 × Hispano Suiza 12G W-12 water-cooled piston engine, 390 kW (520 hp)
- Propellers: 2-bladed

Performance

- Maximum speed: 204 km/h (127 mph, 110 kn)

== See also ==
Related lists

- List of flying boats and floatplanes
