= NVI F.K.29 =

F.K.29

General information
- Type: Light passenger aircraft
- National origin: Netherlands
- Manufacturer: Nationale Vliegtuig Industrie (NVI)
- Designer: Frederick Koolhoven
- Number built: 1

History
- First flight: 1923

The NVI F.K.29 was a small Dutch biplane transport, carrying two passengers who boarded after the nose, with its single engine and fuselage, had been swung open. It was intended to link small local fields to main airports.

== Design and development ==
The F.K.29 was designed by Koolhoven for the NVI (National Aircraft Industry) as a kind of air taxi, transporting two passengers between small local fields and the departure airport of scheduled flights. It was an equal span two bay biplane, with simple pairs of parallel interplane struts between unstaggered wings. The leading edges were straight and the wings were of constant chord out to the ailerons which curved in towards rounded tips. On each wing the upper and lower ailerons were externally interconnected with faired struts.

The fuselage of the F.K.29 was deep and flat sided apart from a rounded upper decking. Its braced tailplane, carrying split elevators with a cut-out for rudder movement was placed on top of the fuselage. The fin was triangular, carrying a round tipped rudder that reached down to the keel. The pilot's cockpit was under the wing trailing edge with a rounded cut-out in the upper edge for enhanced visibility. Ahead of him, between the wings, was an open topped space in which the two passengers sat side-by-side. The most unusual feature of the F.K.29 was the means of access to this space: the whole forward fuselage was hinged so it, complete with engine, could be swung to starboard, allowing the passengers to climb in directly. The hinged nose curved in towards the three cylinder, 100 hp (75 kW) Bristol Lucifer radial engine, which drove a two blade propeller. The F.K.29 had a fixed, conventional undercarriage with a wide track, its mainwheels on shallow V-form struts each with a short, vertical shock absorbing leg from the outer axle to the forward lower wing spar below the inner interplane strut.

== Operational history ==
After its first flight in 1923 and further testing it found no buyers, leaving the prototype the sole example. No records of operational use are known.

== Specifications ==
Data from Wesselink

General characteristics

- Crew: One
- Capacity: Two passengers
- Length: 7.10 m (23 ft 4 in)
- Wingspan: 10.00 m (32 ft 10 in)
- Gross weight: 900 kg (1,984 lb)
- Powerplant: 1 × Bristol Lucifer 3-cylinder air-cooled radial engine, 75 kW (100 hp)
- Propellers: 2-bladed

Performance

- Maximum speed: 180 km/h (110 mph, 97 kn)
