= Koolhoven F.K.54 =

F.K.54
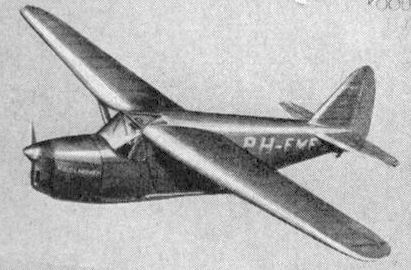

General information
- Type: Three-seat sports aircraft
- National origin: Netherlands
- Manufacturer: N.V. Koolhoven Vliegtuigen
- Number built: 1

History
- First flight: c. autumn 1938

The Koolhoven F.K.54 was a Dutch single-engine, three-seat touring aircraft with a retractable undercarriage. It flew shortly before the start of World War II and its development was abandoned after its first flight as attention turned to military aircraft.

== Design and development ==
The F.K.54 was most notable as Koolhoven's first aircraft with a retractable undercarriage. It was a high-wing monoplane; its wings tapered in plan and had rounded tips. They were braced with a pair of near-parallel struts on each side between wing spars and the lower fuselage longerons, assisted by short jury struts.

The F.K.54's fuselage was flat-sided, with a 140 hp (104 kW) de Havilland Gipsy Major four cylinder inverted inline air-cooled engine in the nose driving a two blade propeller A three-seat, glazed cabin was located under the wing, entered by a port side door. The rear fuselage continued aft at cabin roof height, tapering towards the tail. The tailplane was mounted on top of the fuselage; the fin was straight-edged with a rounded top with a rudder that extended down to the keel. The novel undercarriage was hydraulically operated, the wheels lifting rearwards into the fuselage under the passenger seats. Long, horizontally hinged curved doors then enclosed wheels and legs.

== Operational history ==
The F.K 54 was built for Mr. Van 't Groenewoud, one of the auditors of NV Koolhoven Aircraft. Though the registration reservation PH-APR was made in January 1937 the F.K.54 did not fly until around the autumn of 1938, delayed by Koolhoven's increasing concentration on warplanes. These efforts also prevented the resolution of problems with the undercarriage retraction mechanism. The F.K.54 was neglected and ultimately destroyed because of the war; it was lost to bombing on 10 May 1940 during the German invasion of the Netherlands.

== Specifications ==
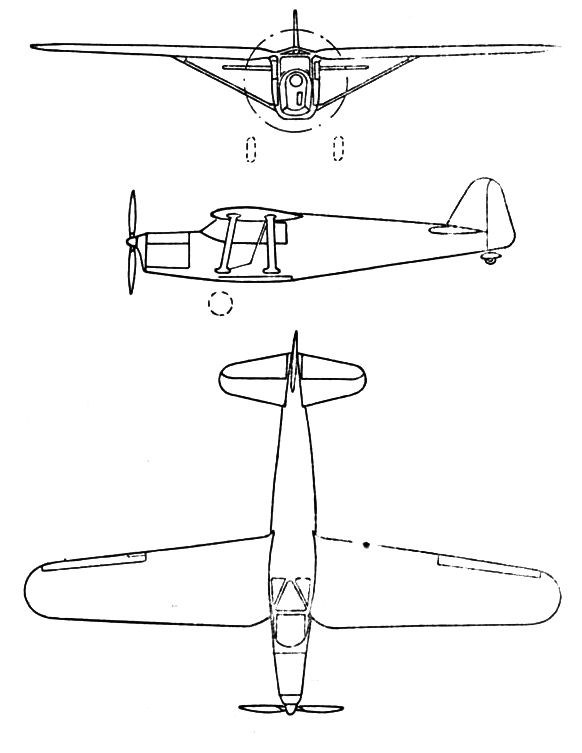
Koolhoven FK.54 3-view drawing from L'Aerophile February 1938

Data from Wesselink

General characteristics

- Capacity: Three
- Length: 7.70 m (25 ft 3 in)
- Wingspan: 11.0 m (36 ft 1 in)
- Gross weight: 1,060 kg (2,337 lb)
- Powerplant: 1 × de Havilland Gipsy Major 4-cylinder inverted air-cooled inline, 100 kW (140 hp)
- Propellers: 2-bladed

Performance

- Maximum speed: 250 km/h (160 mph, 130 kn) at sea level
