= Koolhoven F.K.52 =

Reconnaissance fighter aircraft

F.K.52
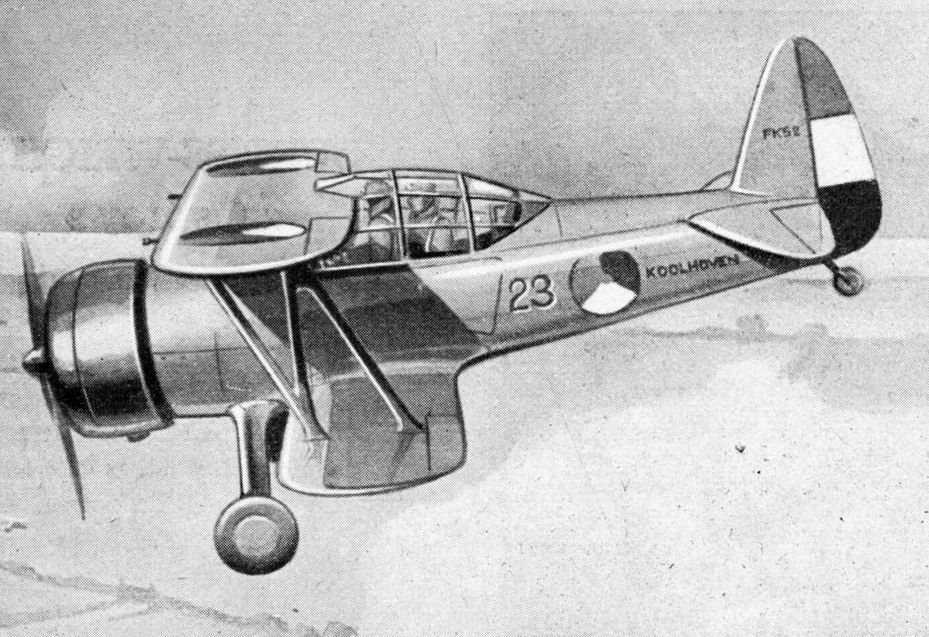

General information
- Type: Reconnaissance-fighter
- Manufacturer: Koolhoven
- Primary users: Dutch Air Force Finnish Air Force
- Number built: 6

History
- Manufactured: 1938-1940
- Introduction date: 1939
- First flight: 9 February 1937
- Retired: 1943

Koolhoven F.K.52 was a Dutch-designed, two-seat reconnaissance-fighter biplane, which was developed in the 1930s by Koolhoven. The aircraft was equipped with an enclosed cockpit and single-strut landing gear. Only six aircraft were produced. The aircraft saw some service in the Finnish Air Force.

== Design and development ==
The FK.52 was proposed as a replacement for the Fokker C.Vs of the Luchtvaartafdeling (LVA), the Dutch Army Air Force. The prototype aircraft made its maiden flight on February 9, 1937. The aircraft was however lost in an accident on August 11 of the same year, while displaying in front of Boy Scouts during the 5th World Scout Jamboree.

Although the Koolhoven was an obsolete design by 1938, they began building a few FK.52s. The Dutch Air Force ordered 36 aircraft in 1939, but only five had been manufactured, when the Germans invaded the Netherlands.

== Operational history ==
During the Winter War, two Koolhovens were purchased by the Swedish count Carl Gustav von Rosen and given to the Finnish Air Force. The aircraft was flown to Finland on January 18, 1940 with the codes KO-129 and KO-130. In March 1940 they bombed and strafed Soviet troops attacking over ice towards Virolahti. During the Winter War, they summed up about 15 combat sorties. Both FK.52 planes were hit by enemy fire.

In 1941 the aircraft were used by LeLv 6 in the Hanko area. Both aircraft were destroyed during the Continuation War, KO-130 became lost during a leaflet-dropping mission over Hanko and made a forced-landing 80 km south of Tallinn, Estonia on August 16, 1941. Both crew members died in the crash. Estonian Forest brothers guerrillas burned the plane and buried the crew in Velise.

The other aircraft, KO-129, was destroyed in an accident in 1943. The pilot bailed out and survived. The plane crashed north of the village Pernaa in Kauhava.

The nickname of the plane was Kolho, "clumsy"

== Operators ==
Finland

- Finnish Air Force operated two aircraft.

Netherlands

- Royal Netherlands Air Force

== Specifications (F.K.52) ==
Data from Syöksypommittajat

General characteristics

- Crew: 2
- Length: 8.25 m (27 ft 1 in)
- Wingspan: 9.8 m (32 ft 2 in)
- Height: 3.3 m (10 ft 10 in)
- Wing area: 28.4 m^{2} (306 sq ft)
- Empty weight: 1,650 kg (3,638 lb)
- Max takeoff weight: 2,500 kg (5,512 lb)
- Powerplant: 1 × Bristol Mercury VIII 9-cylinder air-cooled radial piston engine, 625 kW (838 hp)
- Propellers: 3-bladed variable-pitch propeller

Performance

- Maximum speed: 380 km/h (240 mph, 210 kn)
- Cruise speed: 308 km/h (191 mph, 166 kn)
- Range: 1,130 km (700 mi, 610 nmi)
- Service ceiling: 9,800 m (32,200 ft)

Armament

- Guns:

- 2 × forward-firing 7.7 mm machine guns in wings

- Bombs:

- 150 kg (330 lb) of bombs

== See also ==
Related lists

- List of aircraft of World War II
