= Koolhoven Heidevogel =

Dutch aircraft

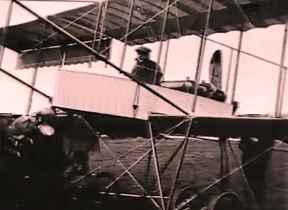
- Heidevogel

General information
- Type: Early experimental aircraft
- National origin: Netherlands
- Designer: Frederick Koolhoven
- Number built: 1

History
- First flight: 1911
- Developed from: Farman III

The Koolhoven Heidevogel was one of the first Dutch aircraft, an improvement of the popular Farman type.

== Development ==
Frits Koolhoven began as car dealer and racing driver but his entry into aviation came in partnership with Henri Wijnmalen whose uncle was the Verwey in the motor car manufacturing business, Verwey and Lugard. An aviation department of the latter developed, with Koolhoven dominant in the factory and Wijnmalen running the flying school.

The Heidevogel (Heathbird or Heatherbird) was one of several pioneer aircraft based on the Farman III and generally known as "Farman types", though it had several modifications to the wings, rudders and accommodation. It was a multi-bay, unequal span biplane with no stagger and wings of constant chord, braced with pairs of parallel interplane struts. Ailerons provided lateral control.

The empennage was supported by an open frame fuselage with longitudinal upper and lower pairs of longerons or booms, each side braced with four vertical strut pairs. At the rear, fixed and almost square horizontal tailplanes stretched between the upper and the lower pairs of booms. A pair of trapezoidal rudders were hinged on the last two verticals, assisted by another central one further forward. The elevator was all moving and mounted ahead of the wings on a pair of vertically converging booms with vertical cross braces.

In Farman types the pilot sat over the wing, completely exposed, with the 37 kW (50 hp) seven cylinder Gnome Omega rotary engine behind him in pusher configuration; Koolhoven added a pod or gondola, its flat sides curving together to a sharp edge at the front. The undercarriage consisted on each side of a pair of wheels on either side of a skid, curved up at the front. Each skid was mounted on two vertical struts attached below the wing at the bases of the innermost interplane struts and laterally braced with an inner diagonal strut to the wing underside. A long, curved tailskid was fixed just ahead of the leading edge of the tailplane.

== Operational history ==
Both Koolhoven and Wijnmalen flew the Heidevogel throughout 1911 but Verwey and Lugard went bankrupt at the end of the year.

== Specifications ==
Data from Wesselink

General characteristics

- Crew: One
- Length: 11.90 m (39 ft 1 in)
- Wingspan: 17.35 m (56 ft 11 in)
- Gross weight: 750 kg (1,653 lb)
- Powerplant: 1 × Gnome Omega 7-cylinder rotary engine, 37 kW (50 hp)

Performance

- Maximum speed: 65 km/h (40 mph, 35 kn)
