= Koolhoven F.K.58 =

1930s Dutch fighter

F.K.58
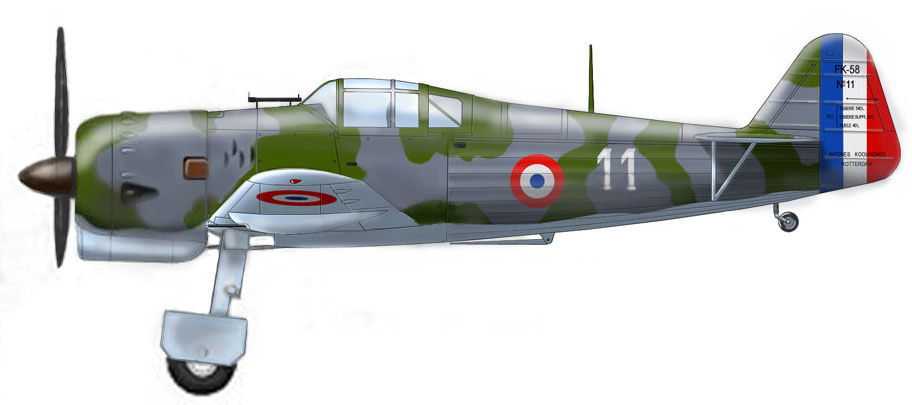
- Koolhoven FK.58 anti-aircraft defense patrol D.A.T. (Polish) at Clermont-Aulnat, June 1940

General information
- Type: Fighter
- Manufacturer: Koolhoven
- Designer: Erich Schatzki
- Primary users: French Air Force Polish Air Force
- Number built: 20

History
- Manufactured: 1939-1940
- Introduction date: 1940
- First flight: 17 July 1938
- Retired: 1940

The Koolhoven F.K.58 was a single engine, interceptor-fighter aircraft designed and mainly manufactured by N V Koolhoven in the Netherlands under contract by France. Intended for Armée de l'Air use, the F.K.58 saw limited service in the Battle of France.

== Design and development ==
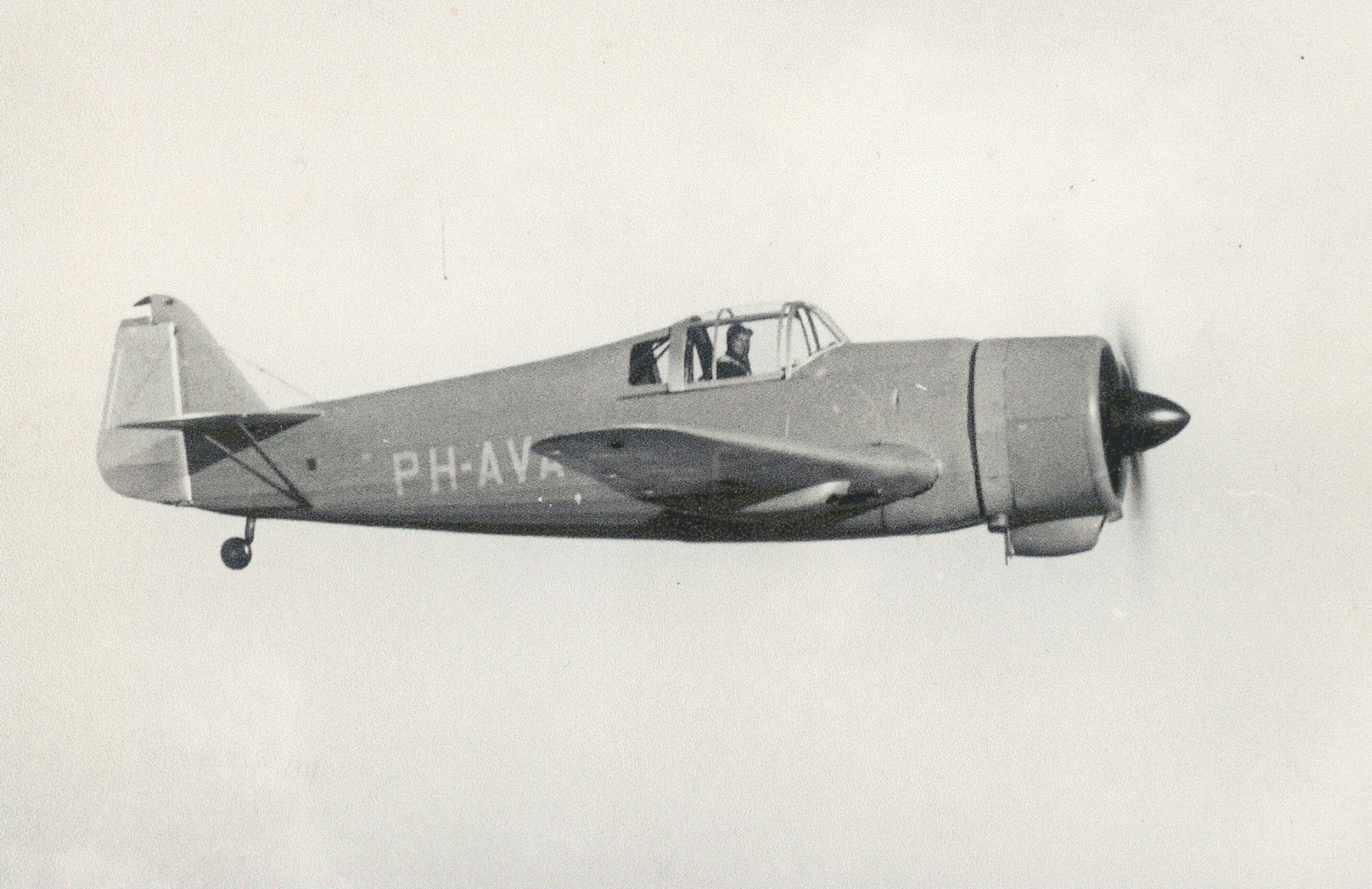
Prototype

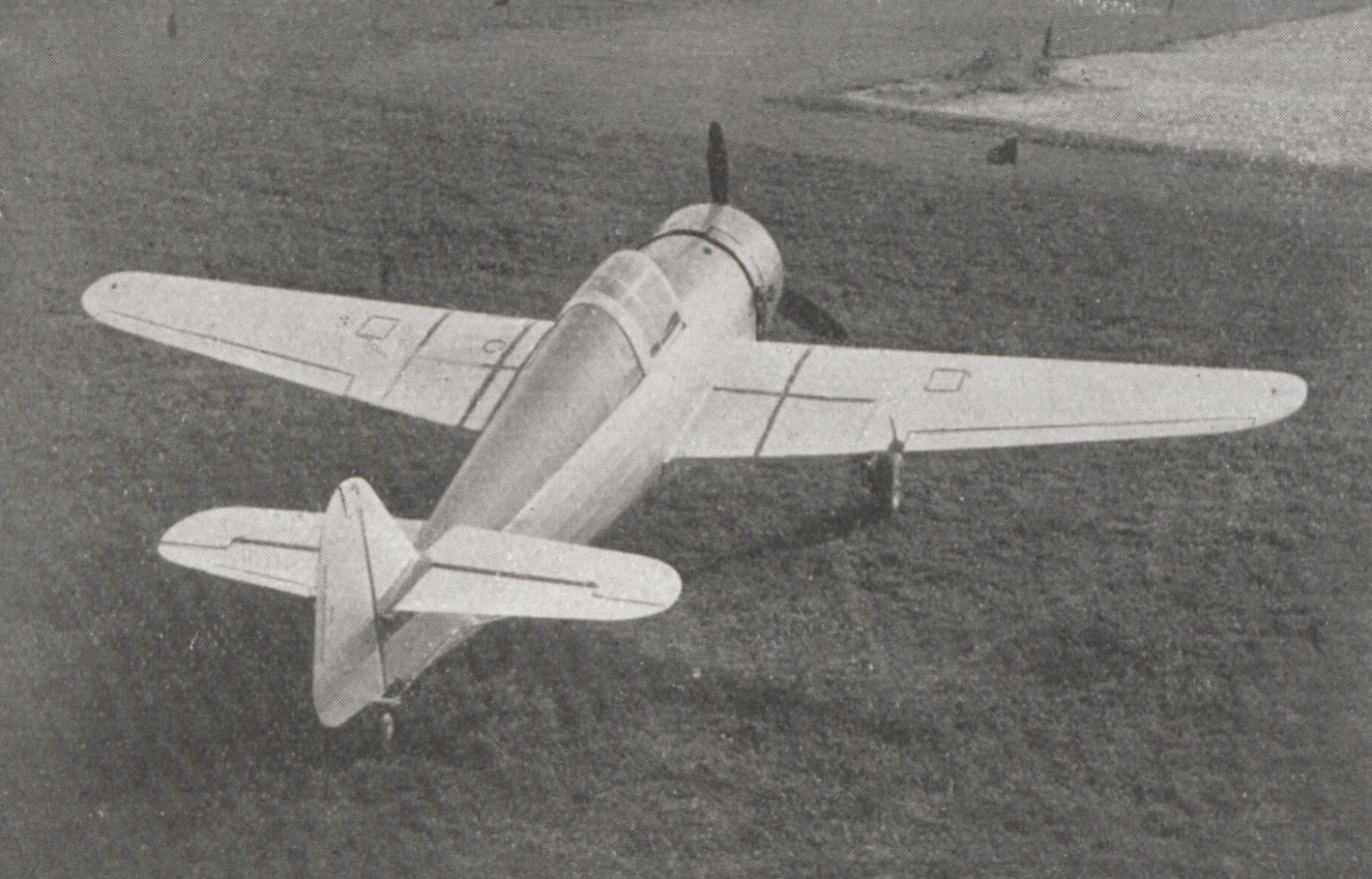
The prototype of the F.K.58. in 1938.

In 1938, the French Air Ministry noticed that domestic aircraft manufacturing capacity could not re-equip the Armée de l'Air with modern fighters quickly enough. In order to win some contracts with the French, the Dutch manufacturer Koolhoven quickly designed a single-seat fighter that would use French-supplied engines and other components. The Koolhoven fighter was intended primarily for fighter units based in the colony of French Indochina. Design work on the new fighter began early in 1938. Erich Schatzki, the designer of the Fokker D.XXI, joined Koolhoven from Fokker in March 1938, but despite claims that Schatzki designed the F.K.58 as well, design work was well underway (60% complete) by the time Schatzki joined, although he was involved in the final design.

The prototype, powered by a Hispano-Suiza 14AA radial engine, flew for the first time on 17 July 1938. The structure of the fuselage consisted of welded steel tubing covered with sheet metal (front part) and fabric (aft); the wing had 2 wooden box spar members and ribs, with a bakelite stressed skin covering. Aerodynamically balanced split flaps on the wing trailing edges ensure a lower landing speed. The oleo-pneumatic undercarriage retracted inwards with the wheels housed in the lower fuselage faired into the lower engine cowling by small doors. The empennage is built up from wood and control surfaces are metal framed with fabric covering.

In January 1939, the Armée de l'Air placed an order for 50 aircraft, to be powered by Gnome-Rhône 14N engines, although the first four aircraft, which were already under construction, were completed with the Hispano-Suiza. When the Dutch order for FK.58s was placed, it was realised that Koolhoven did not have sufficient production capacity to support both orders, and the final 10 FK.58s of the French order were subcontracted to the Belgian company SABCA.

Due to the unavailability of Gnome-Rhône engines and French instruments, just 17 aircraft – six F.K.58s and 11 F.K.58As – were completed at the Koolhoven works, with Dutch-supplied engines and instruments – and delivered to the Armée de l'Air. The remaining 23 aircraft being built in the Netherlands, which were at different stages of completion, were transferred to Nevers, where the aircraft were to be finished by personnel employed by Koolhoven. However, only one F.K.58 was completed before the factory was captured by the Germans, together with the remaining airframes. The ten aircraft being built by SABCA were complete with the exception of their engines, which had not been delivered by France, when Germany invaded Belgium on 10 May 1940, and were placed on a train for delivery to France, but all ten aircraft were destroyed when the train was attacked by German aircraft.

On 2 July 1939, the Dutch government placed an order on behalf of the Luchtvaart Afdeling (Netherlands Army Aviation Corps) for 36 F.K.58s, to be powered by Bristol Taurus engines. However, as the British government restricted exports of the Taurus, alternative engines were proposed, including the Rolls-Royce Merlin and the Daimler-Benz DB 600. Tests were carried out using the DB 600, but hopes to obtain a supply of the German engine via Switzerland failed and in the absence of better alternatives it was decided to use Dutch stocks of the Bristol Mercury VIII (as used by the Dutch Fokker D.21 and Fokker G.1). The lower output of the Mercury, relative to the Taurus, would have reduced speed, with a maximum speed of 460 km/h (290 mph; 250 kn) at 4,400 m (14,400 ft) and a cruise speed of 400 km/h (250 mph; 220 kn) estimated.

The F.K.58s comprising the Dutch order were in various stages of construction when they were destroyed by a German air raid on the Koolhoven factory in May 1940.

Had the Armée de l'Air received its full order of 50 aircraft, before for the Battle of France, it is unlikely that they would have changed the outcome. Even though Koolhoven credited the F.K.58 prototype with high performance, French test centers recorded that the series aircraft were 120 km/h (75 mph; 65 kn) slower than what was claimed by the manufacturer. Additionally, the manoeuvrability was found to be poor by the French pilots.

== Operational history ==
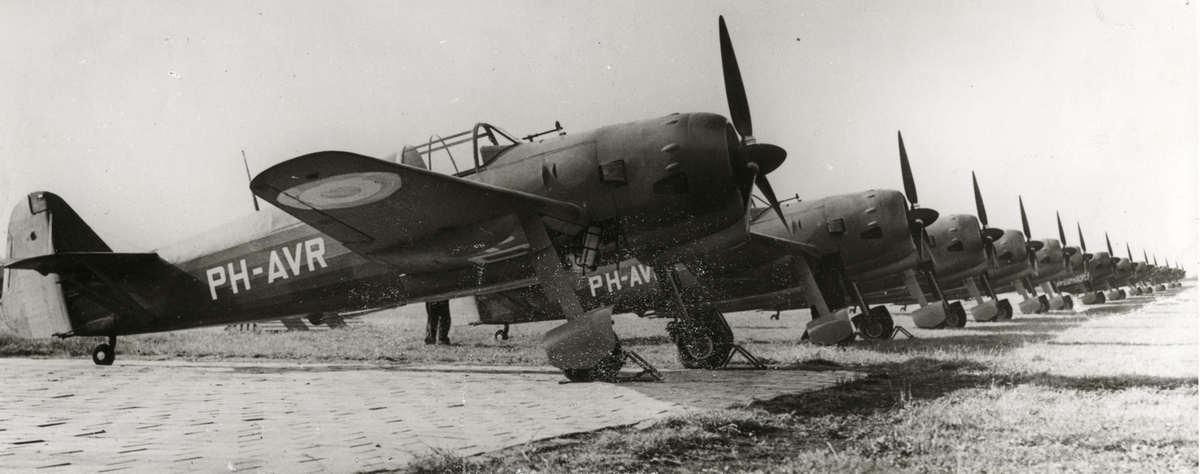
Finished fighters at Koolhoven works airfield, 1939. Airplanes bear Dutch civil markings and French military insignia.

The F.K.58 was originally ordered to serve with AdA units based in French overseas territories, but by the end of 1940, these plans had been abandoned, and attempts were made to dispose of the aircraft, including selling them back to the Netherlands and selling them to Yugoslavia to replace 25 Morane-Saulnier M.S.406s that France had agreed to supply in December 1939 but had since been requisioned by France. In January 1940, it was decided to transfer all 46 Gnome-Rhône-powered aircraft to Finland, as a response to the Soviet invasion, but hostilities between the Soviets and Finland ended before any FK.58s could be sent. On 16 May 1940, however, the type was assigned to four small ad hoc Free Polish air force units. Their official name were patrouilles ("patrols") – as the AdA designated units that defended rear areas against long-range bombers and other enemy aircraft, as part of the Défense Aérienne du Territoire ("Territorial Air Defense"; DAT). Two of the units operated from Salon-de-Provence, and the other two from Clermont-Aulnat air base. Polish captain Walerian Jasionowski was the commander of all four patrouilles.

By May 1940, 12 F.K.58s were operational with the Koolhoven-equipped patrouilles. As delivered, however, the fighters were unarmed and the Poles had to acquire machine guns and fit them. From 30 May 1940, they were in service, patrolling firstly in the Avignon-Marseille area, and then over Clermont-Ferrand. At least 47 operational sorties were recorded, but the Escadron did not encounter enemy aircraft.

The type's service life was short-lived, but no less than five F.K.58s were lost in May and June 1940. After the fall of France, all surviving airframes were scrapped.

== Variants ==
F.K.58 Prototype
Prototype powered by 1,080 hp Hispano-Suiza 14AA engine, 1 built.
F.K.58 (Dutch demonstrator)
Demonstrator for the Luchtvaart Afdeling, powered by a Bristol Mercury engine, 1 built.
F.K.58 [Bristol Taurus]
Dutch version powered by Bristol Taurus engine, projected Dutch aircraft, none built.
F.K.58
First production variant powered by Hispano-Suiza 14AA radial engine, 4 built.
F.K.58A
Production version powered by Gnome-Rhône 14N-39 engine, 13 built.

== Operators ==
France

- Armée de l'Air

Poland

- Polish Air Forces in exile in France
  - operated twelve aircraft, all were FK.58As.

== Specifications (F.K.58) ==
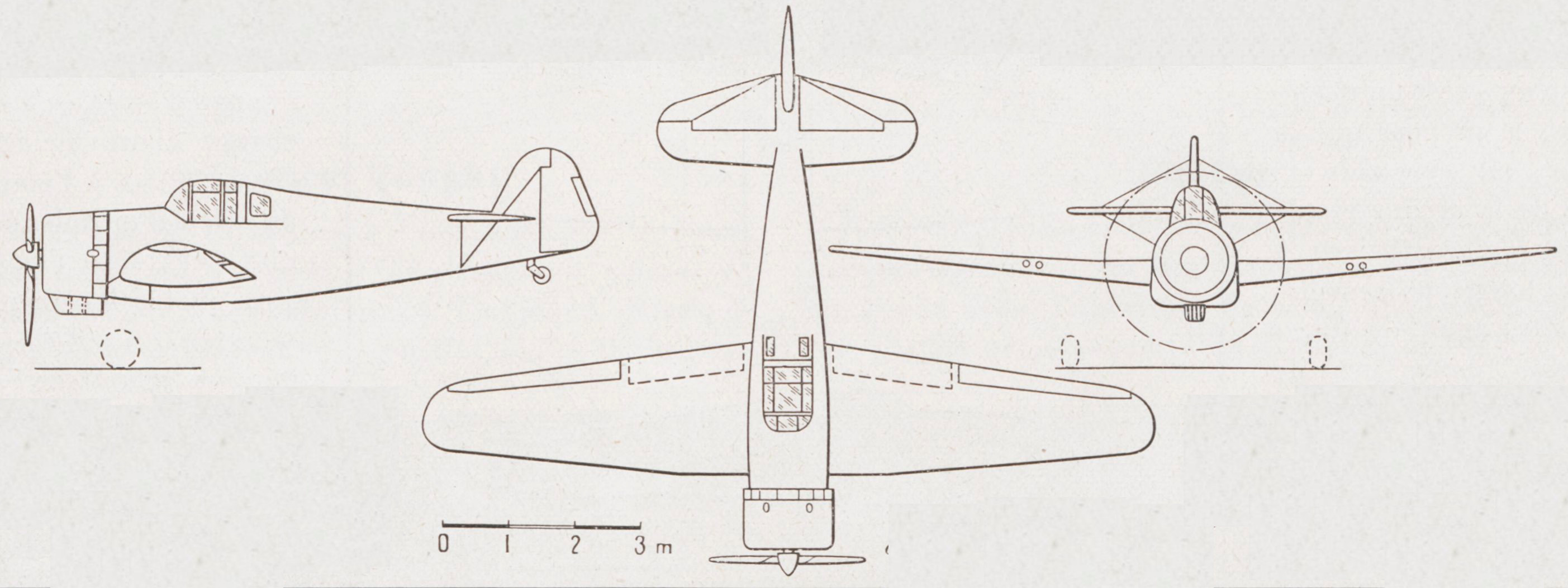
3-views of the F.K.58.

Data from Flight 6 October 1938 : A 300 m.p.h. KOOLHOVEN FIGHTER, Jane's All the World's Aircraft 1938

General characteristics

- Crew: 1
- Length: 8.69 m (28 ft 6 in)
- Wingspan: 9.96 m (32 ft 8 in)
- Wing area: 17.3 m^{2} (186 sq ft)
- Empty weight: 1,810 kg (3,990 lb)
- Fuel capacity: 505 L (133 US gal; 111 imp gal) in three wing tanks
- Powerplant: 1 × Hispano-Suiza 14AA-10 14-cylinder air-cooled radial piston engine, 810 kW (1,080 hp) at 4,511 m (14,800 ft)

alternative powerplants include:- 670 kW (900 hp) Bristol Taurus and 770 kW (1,030 hp) Gnome-Rhône 14N-16

- Propellers: 3-bladed variable-pitch propeller

Performance

- Maximum speed: 483 km/h (300 mph, 261 kn) at 4,493 m (14,740 ft)
- Cruise speed: 431 km/h (268 mph, 233 kn)
- Range: 853 km (530 mi, 461 nmi)
- Service ceiling: 10,200 m (33,500 ft)
- Rate of climb: 16.3 m/s (3,210 ft/min) at 4,001 m (13,126 ft)
- Time to altitude: 6,998 m (22,960 ft) in 8 minutes 48 seconds
- Wing loading: 147 kg/m^{2} (30.2 lb/sq ft)
- Power/mass: 0.31 kW/kg (0.19 hp/lb)

Armament

- Guns: 4 × 7.5 mm FN-Browning machine guns in underwing fairings

== See also ==
Aircraft of comparable role, configuration, and era

- Bloch MB.152
- Curtiss P-36 Hawk
- Fokker D.XXI
- Hawker Hurricane
- IAR 80
- Messerschmitt Bf 109
- Mitsubishi A6M Zero
- Morane-Saulnier M.S.406
- Weiss Manfréd WM-23 Ezüst Nyíl

Related lists

- List of aircraft of the French Air Force during World War II
- List of aircraft of World War II

== Bibliography ==
- "A 300 m.p.h. Koolhaven Fighter". Flight. Vol. XXXIV, no. 1554. 6 October 1938. p. 298.
- Comas, Mathieu (August 1997). "Un chasseur hollandais pour la France: Le Koolhoven FK 58 (1ère partie)" [A Dutch Fighter for France: The Koolhoven FK 58]. Avions: Toute l'aéronautique et son histoire (in French). No. 53. pp. 22–29. ISSN 1243-8650.
- Comas, Mathieu (September 1997). "Un chasseur hollandais pour la France: Le Koolhoven FK 58 (2ème partie)". Avions: Toute l'aéronautique et son histoire (in French). No. 54. pp. 10–17. ISSN 1243-8650.
- Comas, Mathieu (October 1997). "Un chasseur hollandais pour la France: Le Koolhoven FK 58 (3ème partie et fin)". Avions: Toute l'aéronautique et son histoire (in French). No. 55. pp. 35–41. ISSN 1243-8650.
- Ehrengardt, Christian-Jacques (2018). Encyclopédie des Avions de Chasse Français, 1939-1942. Aix-en-Provence: Caraktère. ISBN 978-2-916-403-151.
- Green, William (1961). Warplanes of the Second World War: Fighters: Volume III. London: Macdonald & Co.(Publishers). ISBN 0-356-01447-9.
- Grey, C.G.; Bridgman, Leonard, eds. (1938). Jane's all the World's Aircraft 1938. London: Sampson Low, Marston & Co.
- Hazewinkel, Harm J. (April 1994). "Koolhoven's Unwanted Fighter". Aeroplane Monthly. Vol. 22, no. 4. pp. 58–62. ISSN 0143-7240.
- Hazewinkel, Harm J. (May 1994). "Koolhoven's Unwanted Fighter (Part 2)". Aeroplane Monthly. Vol. 22, no. 5. pp. 66–68. ISSN 0143-7240.
- Taylor, John W.R. (1969). "Koolhoven F.K.58". Combat Aircraft of the World from 1909 to the present. New York: G.P. Putnam's Sons. ISBN 0-425-03633-2.
