= Koolhoven F.K.46 =

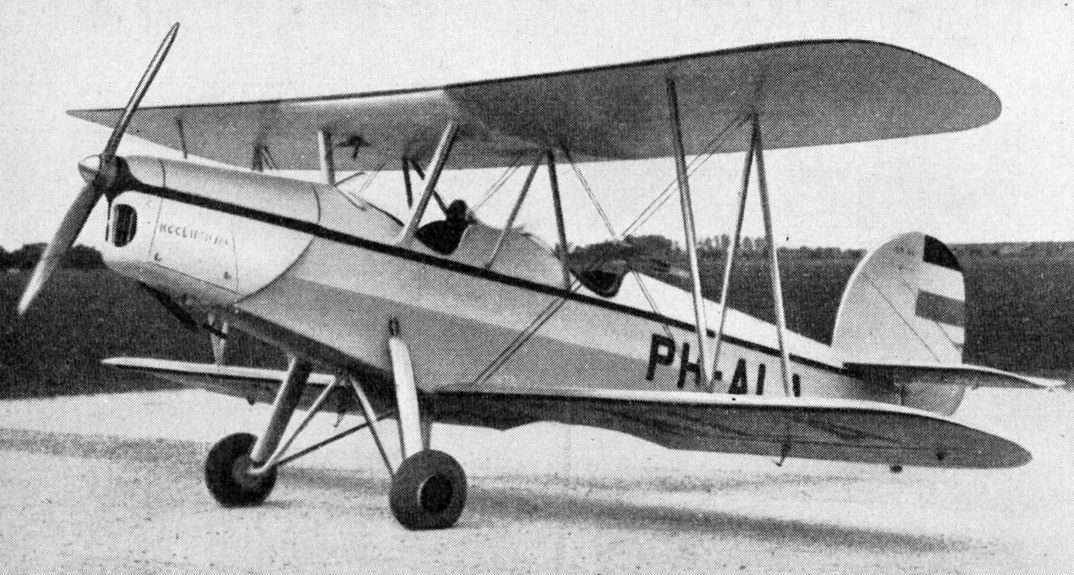

General information
- Type: Training biplane
- National origin: Netherlands
- Manufacturer: Koolhoven
- Primary user: Nationale Luchtvaart School
- Number built: 13+

History
- First flight: 1933

The Koolhoven F.K.46 was a 1930s Dutch training biplane designed and built by Koolhoven.

The F.K.46 was a two-seat biplane with a fixed tailwheel landing gear and tandem open cockpits. The prototype first flew in 1933, powered by a Cirrus Hermes engine. A second prototype was fitted with a sliding cockpit canopy. The aircraft entered limited production and four were used by the Nationale Luchtvaart School (Dutch National Flying School). One aircraft was evaluated by the Dutch Army. In 1935, a reduced-weight version, designated F.K.46L, was built and it was powered by a 95 hp (71 kW) Walter Minor engine. It was the only one ever built.

Most of the F.K.46s did not survive the German invasion in May of 1940. However, one was sent to South Africa for evaluation by the South African Air Force even though it was expensive compared to the de Havilland Tiger Moth. The surviving aircraft was later impressed into service by the South African Air Force.

== Operators ==
Netherlands

- Nationale Luchtvaart School

South Africa

- South African Air Force

== Specifications ==
General characteristics

- Crew: 2
- Length: 7.30 m (23 ft 11.5 in)
- Wingspan: 8.0 m (26 ft 3 in)
- Gross weight: 870 kg (1,918 lb)
- Powerplant: 1 × de Havilland Gipsy Major , 97 kW (130 hp)

Performance

- Maximum speed: 175 km/h (109 mph, 95 kn)

== See also ==
Aircraft of comparable role, configuration, and era

- de Havilland Tiger Moth
- Stampe SV.4
