= Frederick Koolhoven =

Dutch aerospace engineer

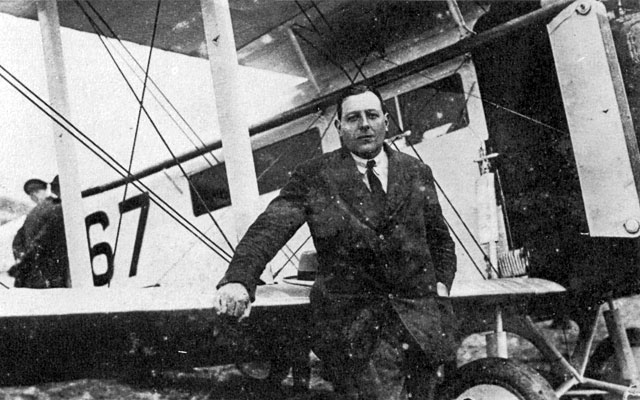
- Koolhoven with the prototype British Aerial Transport F.K.26, April 1919.
- Born: 11 January 1886; Bloemendaal, Netherlands
- Died: 1 July 1946 (aged 60); Haarlem, Netherlands
- Other names: Frits
- Occupations: Mechanical engineer Racing driver Aviator; Aerospace engineer Company director

Frederick (Frits) Koolhoven (11 January 1886 – 1 July 1946) was an aircraft designer in Britain and his native Netherlands.

Koolhoven was born in Bloemendaal, Netherlands. After training as an engineer in Liège and Antwerp, he worked from 1907 as a mechanical engineer for Minerva in Antwerp, and also drove in races and rallies for them. He became interested in aviation. In 1910 he acquired his own Hanriot aircraft, and was involved in the construction of the first Dutch plane the "Heidevogel"

He designed many aircraft, initially in England from 1912 for British Deperdussin, then from 1914 for Armstrong Whitworth Aircraft, then from 1917 as chief designer for the British Aerial Transport Company alongside the Dutch chief draughtsman Robert B.C. Noorduyn.

He returned to the Netherlands, but there the market was dominated by Fokker, so he returned to his old job as an automobile engineer for the Spyker automobile factory.

In 1921, a group of businessmen founded the Nationale Vliegtuig Industrie (N.V.I. - "National Aircraft Industry", Inc.), and hired him as their chief designer. The company lasted only four years. As with BAT, N.V.I. turned out many technically advanced designs, which attracted attention from all over the world but virtually no orders.

At the demise of N.V.I. Koolhoven convinced several shareholders that the company would still have been viable if he had had complete control of the operations. So when N.V.I. was dissolved, its assets were taken over by a new company: N.V. Koolhoven vliegtuigen ("Koolhoven aircraft, Incorporated").

The company, Koolhoven, became the second aircraft manufacturing company in the Netherlands after Fokker, but the factory at Waalhaven was destroyed by German bombing in the Blitzkrieg on 10 May 1940 at the outbreak of World War II. Frederick Koolhoven was convinced that the bombing had everything to do with his contribution as an aircraft designer in England during World War I. For unknown reasons (possibly to avoid persecution for his work in the UK during World War I, or for illegal aircraft sales to the Spanish Republic) he became a very inactive member of the National Socialist Movement in the Netherlands (NSB). After the war he was captured by the Dutch police because of this membership but he was released several days later. Frederick Koolhoven died of a stroke at Haarlem in 1946.

== See also ==
- Deperdussin Seagull for his work at British Deperdussin Company (1913)
- Armstrong Whitworth Aircraft for Koolhoven aircraft F.K 1 to F.K. 10 (1914 to 1917)
- British Aerial Transport for Koolhoven aircraft F.K 22 to F.K. 28 (1918 to 1920)
- Desoutter Aircraft Company which made Koolhoven aircraft (F.K. 41) under licence in England
- Koolhoven for a list of his aircraft manufactured by N.V. Koolhoven; F.K. 30 to F.K. 59 (1926 to 1940)
