= V10 (disambiguation) =

A V10 is an engine with ten cylinders in two banks of five.

V10 or V-10 may also refer to:

== Aircraft ==
- North American Rockwell OV-10 Bronco, an American observation and light attack aircraft
- Škoda-Kauba V10, a Czechoslovak trainer project
- Volland V-10, a French biplane

== Automobiles ==
- Lancia Esatau V.10, an Italian bus
- Toyota Camry (V10), a Japanese sedan
- Zotye V10, a Chinese microvan

== Other uses ==
- ATC code V10, a subgroup of the Anatomical Therapeutic Chemical Classification System
- Canon V-10, a microcomputer
- Danhai New Town light rail station, in New Taipei, Taiwan
- ITU-T V.10, a telecommunications standard
- LG V10, a smartphone
- Version 10 Unix
- V10, a grade in bouldering
- V10, a personal history of malignant neoplasm, in the ICD-9 V codes
