= Kellner-Béchereau EC.4 =

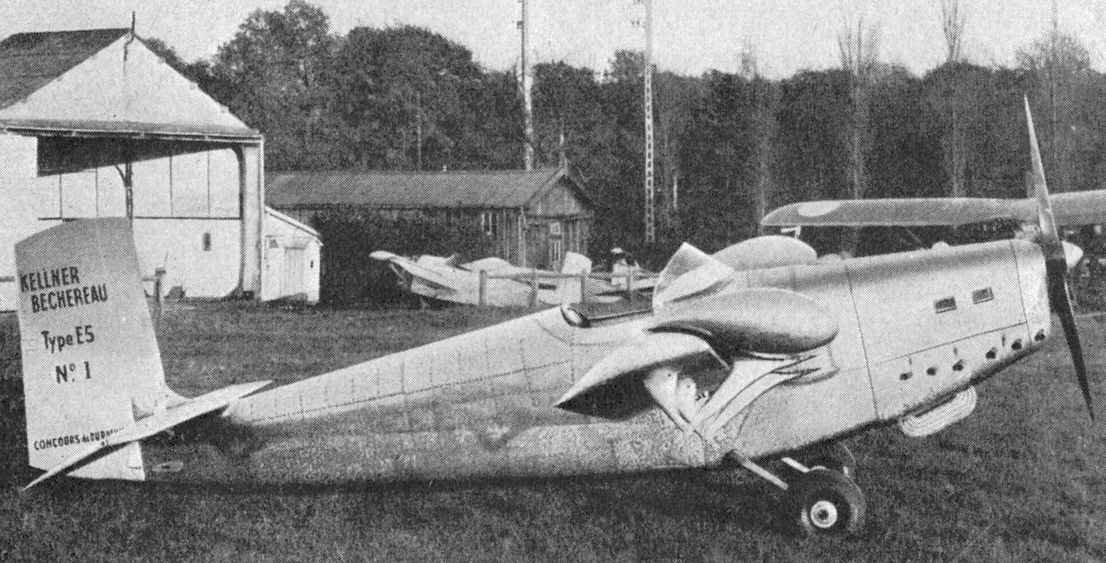
- ED.5

General information
- Type: Side by side basic trainer
- National origin: France
- Manufacturer: Avions Kellner-Béchereau
- Designer: Louis Béchereau
- Number built: 1

History
- First flight: 1937

The Kellner-Béchereau EC.4 and Kellner-Béchereau ED.5 were a pair of French training aircraft with side-by-side seating and a novel "double wing" patented by their designer, Louis Béchereau. The principal difference was that the EC.4 had an all-wood structure whereas the ED.5 was all-metal. Both were single-engine, mid-wing cantilever monoplanes.

== Design and development ==
In the 1930s the veteran aircraft designer Louis Béchereau set up Avions Kellner-Béchereau, a collaboration with the well-known automobile coach builders Kellner. In 1936–37 this company built a short series of small monoplanes exploiting one of Béchereau's patents, a full span lateral division of the wing into two sections forming a "double wing", a little like that used by Junkers but with a more equal division of area. The wing was first tested on the single-seat Kellner-Béchereau E.1 on 1936, which was followed by two larger and more powerful two-seaters, the EC.4 and ED.5. Both of these were designed to meet the French Air Ministry's requirement for a pre-military trainer aircraft to be used by the clubs set up in the "Aviation Populaire" programme.

Like the E.1, the EC.4 was a wooden aircraft with spruce frames and plywood covering. It was a mid-wing cantilever monoplane with straight, thick section, constant chord wings of quite high aspect ratio (9.45). The lateral division was at about 65% chord, with the rear part joined to the front with conspicuous V-shaped faired underwing hinges. In normal flight the two parts were close together and the rear sections acted both as lifting surface and, differentially, ailerons but they could also be lowered together as slotted flaps, moving rearwards as well as down to produce a slot between fore and aft parts.

The fuselage was rectangular in cross section, with an open cockpit seating two side by side at the wing trailing edge and an inverted in-line 40 kW (60 hp) Train T6 in the nose. A straight edged tailplane was mounted on the upper fuselage longerons and carried elevators with a small cut-out for rudder movement. The latter, mounted on a very narrow fin, was rectangular and extended to the bottom of the fuselage. The rear control surfaces were fabric covered. The EC.4 had a conventional undercarriage with cantilever main legs hinged on the lower longerons, rubber sprung inside the fuselage.

The second design, the ED.5 was similar to the EC.4 except that it was a metal aircraft. The forward part of the wing and the whole fuselage were constructed in a process also patented by Béchereau. It involved the use of wooden formers, shaped to the required skin profile but with cut-outs for strengthening members such as ribs. These were placed into the mould before the duralumin skin was fitted over the former and held down with leather belts. Once secured, the internal pieces and skin could be joined, still in the mould, by screws or rivets. The rear wing surfaces were also metal, though more conventionally built.

The dimensions of the EC.4 and ED.5 were the same, as were seating, engine and undercarriage. The loaded weight of the metal aircraft was 25 kg (55 lb) lower. Performance was similar, with identical maximum speeds; the lighter ED.5 had a 5 km/h (3 mph) lower stalling speed but a 55 km (35 mi) shorter range.

The Kellner-Béchereau designs were not ordered for the Aviation Populaire programme, the Air Ministry preferring the Caudron C.270 and the Salmson Cri-Cri which were both bought in large numbers. Instead, Kellner-Béchereau, along with other manufacturers, built the Cri-Cri under licence.

== Specifications (EC.4) ==
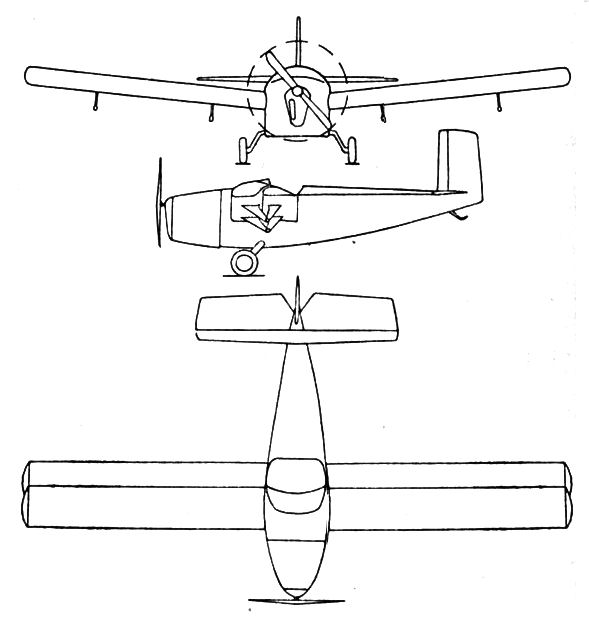
Kellner-Béchereau ED.5 3-view drawing from L'Aerophile February 1938

Data from Jane's All the World's Aircraft 1938

General characteristics

- Capacity: 1
- Length: 5.30 m (17 ft 5 in)
- Wingspan: 8.80 m (28 ft 10 in)
- Height: 1.60 m (5 ft 3 in)
- Wing area: 8.2 m^{2} (88 sq ft)
- Gross weight: 525 kg (1,157 lb)
- Powerplant: 1 × Train 6T 6-cylinder air-cooled in-line inverted, 45 kW (60 hp)
- Propellers: 2-bladed

Performance

- Maximum speed: 160 km/h (99 mph, 86 kn)
- Stall speed: 65 km/h (40 mph, 35 kn)
- Range: 845 km (525 mi, 456 nmi)
- Rate of climb: 2.0 m/s (390 ft/min)
