= Kellner-Béchereau E.1 =

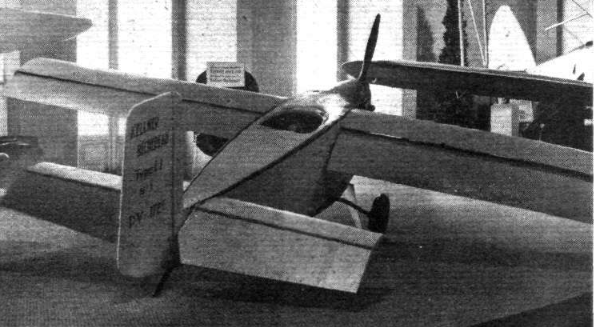

General information
- Type: Experimental light aircraft
- National origin: France
- Manufacturer: Avions Kellner-Béchereau, Boulogne-Billancourt
- Designer: Louis Béchereau
- Number built: 1

History
- First flight: 1936

The Kellner-Béchereau E.1 was an experimental single engine, single seat light aircraft, designed in France in the 1930s. It was a monoplane with a novel "double" wing, the rear part providing lift and lateral control as well as acting as slotted flaps.

== Design and development ==
Louis Béchereau's career as an aircraft designer began before the First World War when he worked first for Armand Deperdussin and then Louis Bleriot. Towards the end of the war he joined Adolphe Bernard's newly founded company for a short time. In the 1930s, he set up Avions Kellner-Béchereau, a collaboration with the well known automobile coach builders Kellner. In 1936–1937 they built a short series of small monoplanes exploiting one of Béchereau's patents, a full span lateral division of the wing into two sections forming a "double wing" a little like that used by Junkers but with a more equal division of area. The Kellner-Béchereau E.1 was the first of these.

The E.1 was a wooden aircraft with spruce frames and plywood covering. It was a mid-wing cantilever monoplane with straight, thick section, constant chord wings of quite high aspect ratio (8.45). The lateral division was at about 65% chord, with the rear part joined to the front with conspicuous V-shaped faired underwing hinges. In normal flight the two parts were close together and the rear sections acted both as lifting surface and, differentially, ailerons but they could also be lowered together as slotted flaps, moving rearwards as well as down to produce a slot between fore and aft parts. The fuselage was rectangular in cross section, with a single place open cockpit at the wing trailing edge, baggage space behind and an inverted in-line 30 kW (40 hp) Train 4T in the nose. A straight edged tailplane was mounted on the upper fuselage longerons and carried elevators with a small cut-out for rudder movement. The latter, mounted on a very narrow fin, was rectangular and extended to the bottom of the fuselage. The rear control surfaces were fabric covered. The E.1 had a conventional undercarriage with cantilever main legs hinged on the lower longerons, rubber sprung inside the fuselage.

After flight tests in 1936, the E.1 was developed into a pair of larger and more powerful side by side seat basic trainers, the wooden Kellner-Béchereau EC.4 and the metal Kellner-Béchereau ED.5, flown in 1937.

== Variants ==
Kellner-Béchereau E.1
A wooden light aircraft powered by a 4-cylinder Train 4T inverted air-cooled four stroke piston engine developing 30 kW (40 hp).
Kellner-Béchereau E.C.4
An enlarged E.1 powered by a 6-cylinder Train 6T delivering 40 kW (54 hp)
Kellner-Béchereau E.D.5
Outwardly identical to the E.C.4 but constructed of Duralumin.

== Specifications ==
Data from Jane's All the World's Aircraft 1938

General characteristics

- Capacity: 1
- Length: 4.42 m (14 ft 6 in)
- Wingspan: 6.50 m (21 ft 4 in)
- Height: 1.98 m (6 ft 6 in)
- Wing area: 5.0 m^{2} (54 sq ft)
- Empty weight: 172 kg (379 lb)
- Gross weight: 276 kg (608 lb)
- Powerplant: 1 × Train 4T 6-cylinder inverted in-line air cooled, 30 kW (40 hp)
- Propellers: 2-bladed

Performance

- Maximum speed: 160 km/h (99 mph, 86 kn)
- Stall speed: 58 km/h (36 mph, 31 kn)
- Endurance: 3 hr
- Service ceiling: 6,000 m (20,000 ft)
- Rate of climb: 2.0 m/s (390 ft/min) initial
