= Kellner-Béchereau E.60 =

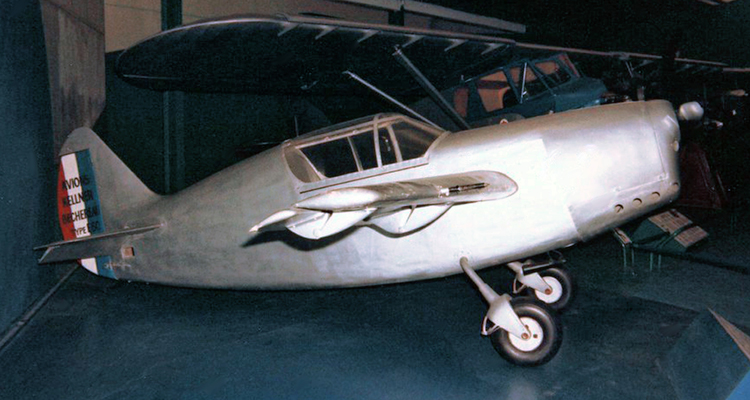

General information
- Type: Prototype training aircraft
- National origin: France
- Manufacturer: Avions Kellner-Béchereau, Boulogne-Billancourt
- Designer: Louis Béchereau
- Number built: 1

History
- First flight: 1940

The Kellner-Béchereau E.60 was a prototype single-engine, single-seat training aircraft, designed in France in the late 1930s. It was a monoplane with a novel "double" wing, the rear part providing lift and lateral control as well as acting as slotted flaps.

== Specifications ==
Data from Mihaly, Edouard. Le Kellner-Bechereau E.60, p. 9

General characteristics

- Capacity: 1
- Length: 4.9 m (16 ft 1 in)
- Wingspan: 5.4 m (17 ft 9 in)
- Wing area: 3 m^{2} (32 sq ft)
- Empty weight: 410 kg (904 lb)
- Gross weight: 580 kg (1,279 lb)
- Powerplant: 1 × Walter Mikron II 4-cylinder inverted in-line air cooled, 46 kW (62 hp)
- Propellers: 2-bladed

Performance

- Maximum speed: 215 km/h (134 mph, 116 kn)
- Stall speed: 100 km/h (62 mph, 54 kn)
- Endurance: 3.5 hr
- Rate of climb: 3.0 m/s (590 ft/min) initial
