= Sud-Est SE.200 Amphitrite =

French flying boat airliner with 6 piston engines, 1942

LeO H-49, SE.200 Amphitrite
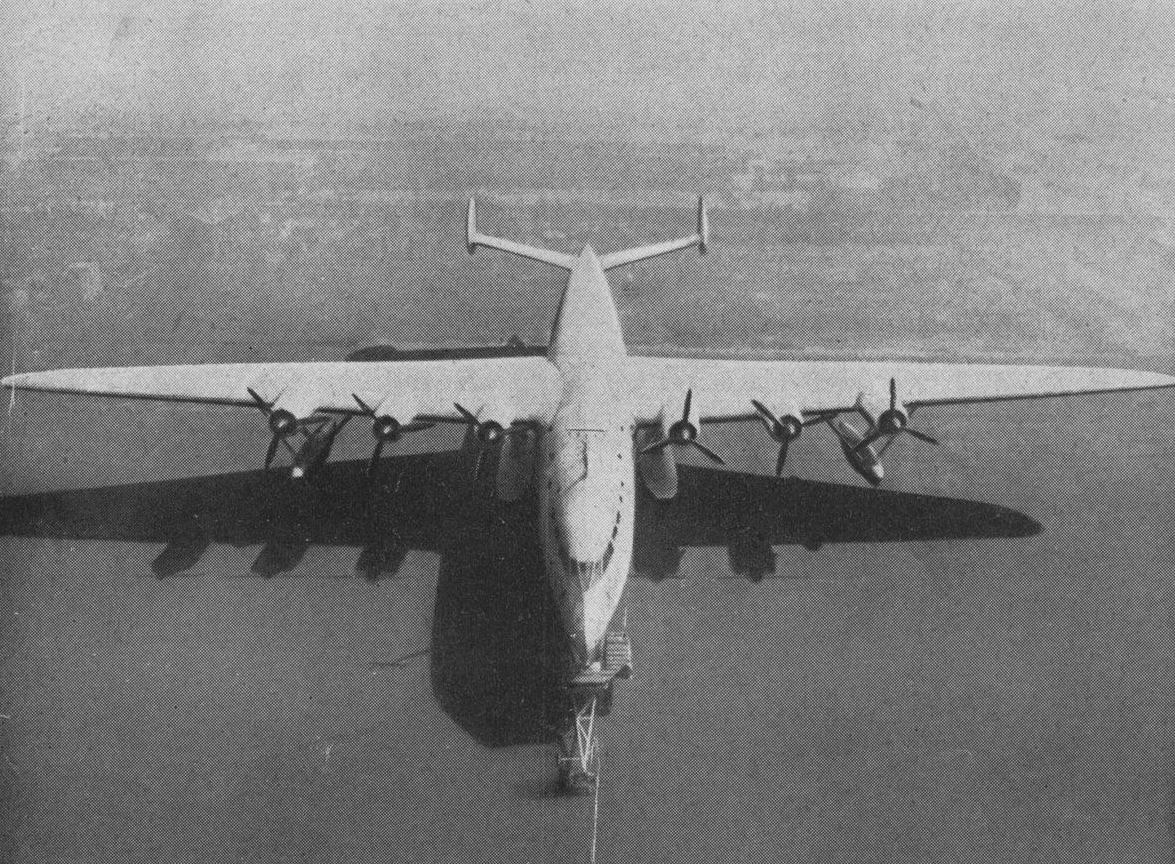
- SE-200

General information
- Type: Airliner
- National origin: France
- Manufacturer: Lioré et Olivier, SNCASE
- Status: Abandoned
- Number built: 3 (+2 uncompleted airframes)

History
- First flight: 11 December 1942

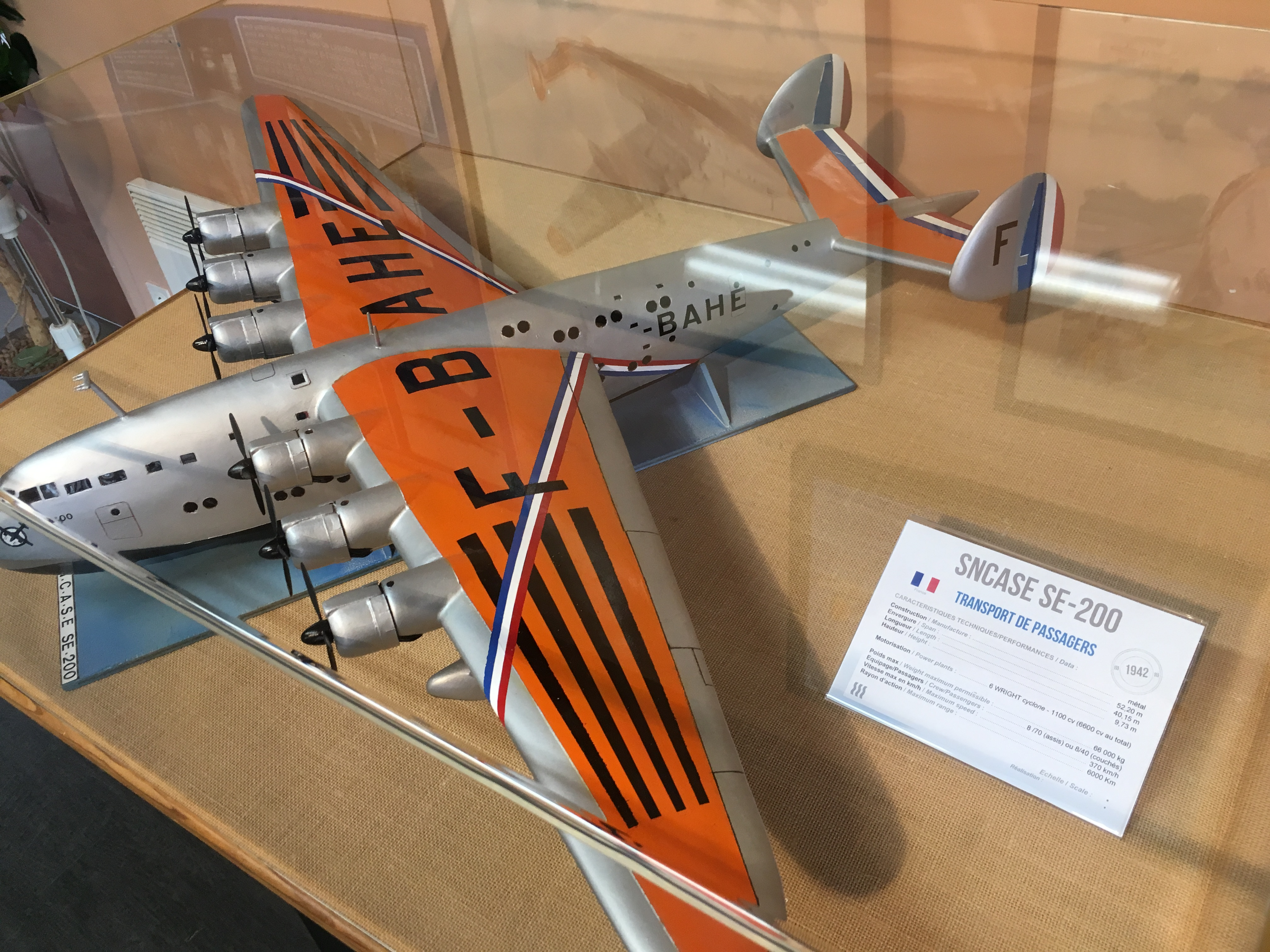
Model at museum (au musée historique de l'hydraviation) in Biscarrosse, France

The Sud-Est SE.200 Amphitrite (named after Amphitrite) was a flying boat airliner built in France in the late 1930s, originally designated as the Lioré et Olivier LeO H-49. It was a large, six-engine design with a high-set cantilever monoplane wing, and twin tails.

Design work on the SE.200 started in 1936 as a prospective transatlantic flying boat for the national flag carrier Air France in response to a French Air Ministry specification. Its original manufacturer, Lioré et Olivier, was merged into SNCASE as a result of the wider nationalisation of the French aircraft industry; work on the project continued nonetheless. By the outbreak of the Second World War, a total of four SE.200s were under construction at Marignane.

Despite shortages and restrictions alike, work proceeded on these airframes even after the fall of France, along with that of a fifth flying boat that was also started. It allegedly was feared that the SE.200 could be a target of sabotage actions as well as a potential flight risk. Nevertheless, the first SE.200, christened Rochambeau, performed its maiden flight on 11 December 1942. After a period of test flying, the first flying boat was seized in January 1944 by the German occupation forces and relocated to the Bodensee, where it was destroyed in an air raid by the Royal Air Force on 17 April 1944. A United States Army Air Force raid on Marignane on 16 September 1944 destroyed the second SE.200 and damaged the other airframes.

By the end of the conflict, the third SE.200 had avoided major damage and made enough progress that it was decided to complete. Accordingly, on 2 April 1946, it performed its first flight; the third SE.200 was used to conduct flight testing throughout the late 1940s, but sustained damage from a hard landing in October 1949 and was subsequently scrapped. Only the first and third flying boats were ever believed to have flown, all other examples were scrapped prior to completion.

== Design and development ==
The origins of the Sud-Est SE.200 Amphitrite can be traced back to 1936 and the issuing of a specification by the French Air Ministry that sought a new transatlantic airliner to be operated by the national flag carrier Air France; the prospective aircraft was to possess a range of 6,000 km (3,700 mi) as well as a capacity for up to 20 passengers and 500 kg of cargo. The French aircraft manufacturer Lioré et Olivier opted to produce its own clean-sheet response to the specification. Initially designated LeO H.49 , it was a large flying boat design, featuring a unbraced wing and a twin-fin tail unit. To bolster its buoyancy and stability while on the water's surface, floats were directly attached to the wing. It was envisaged for the type to be powered by an arrangement of six Wright R-3350 Duplex-Cyclone, each capable of producing up to 1,450 hp. Competing designs were submitted by various other French aircraft manufacturers, including Latécoère and Potez-CAMS (which submitted the Laté 631 and the Potez-CAMS 161 respectively); approval was issued for examples of all designs submitted to be produced. A large mock-up of the SE.200, resting on simulated water, was displayed at the 1938 Salon de l'Aéronautique.

As a consequence of France's nationalisation of numerous domestical aircraft manufacturers in the late 1930s, the aircraft was redesignated as SE.200 designation to reflect the integration of creation of Lioré et Olivier into SNCASE. Development work was hampered by the outbreak of the Second World War and subsequent shortages of key materials, including fuel. Work on the programme continued despite the fall of France on 22 June 1940, although restrictions enacted by the Germans further impacted the programme. It has been alleged that German officials were concerned that, as the SE.200 could easily reach the Free French-held positions in North Africa, any completed examples were a potential flight risk. There were also suspicions that the programme could be deliberately sabotaged, although no such efforts were actually mounted by the French Resistance.

On 11 December 1942, the first SE.200, christened Rochambeau, performed its maiden flight in the hands of Jacques Lacarme. Test flying was protracted due to a sustained fuel shortage. One discovery of early testing was the need to modify the design of the tail unit. On 17 January 1944, the first SE.200 was flown by an all-German aircrew from Marignane to Bodensee; three months later, it was sunk as a result of a bombing raid by a pair of RAF Mosquitos. Separately, the second SE.200 had been destroyed at Marignane when the hangar it was kept in was struck during a heavy air raid on the factory. The third example, which was also at Marignane during this raid, suffered less damage and thus was repairable after the conflict. The intended Wright Super Cyclone engines were never fitted to the SE.200, as such engines were prioritised for other aircraft; instead, the less powerful but domestically build Gnome-Rhône 14R-26 engine was fitted instead.

On 21 July 1946, the third SE.200 performed a symbolic flight to Germany; it also appeared at at least one public air show around this time. It was subsequently extensively used for flight testing, being used to evaluate a variety of engines and other aeronautical apparatus; its long endurance and large dimensions proved to be particularly helpful in this capacity. However, the third flying boat's career was cut short after it suffered a hard landing. While the damage was actually repaired and several further flights were conducted, it was ultimately decided to abandon further work and instead scrap the flying boat. The fourth aircraft, which was reportedly 95 percent complete, remained at Marignane until the mid 1960s. Plans existed to also complete the fourth airframe, but this ultimately did not happen; both it and the fifth airframe were eventually scrapped. During 1966, the remains of the first SE.200 were raised by the German aircraft manufacturer Dornier.

== Operators ==
France

- French Navy

== Specifications ==
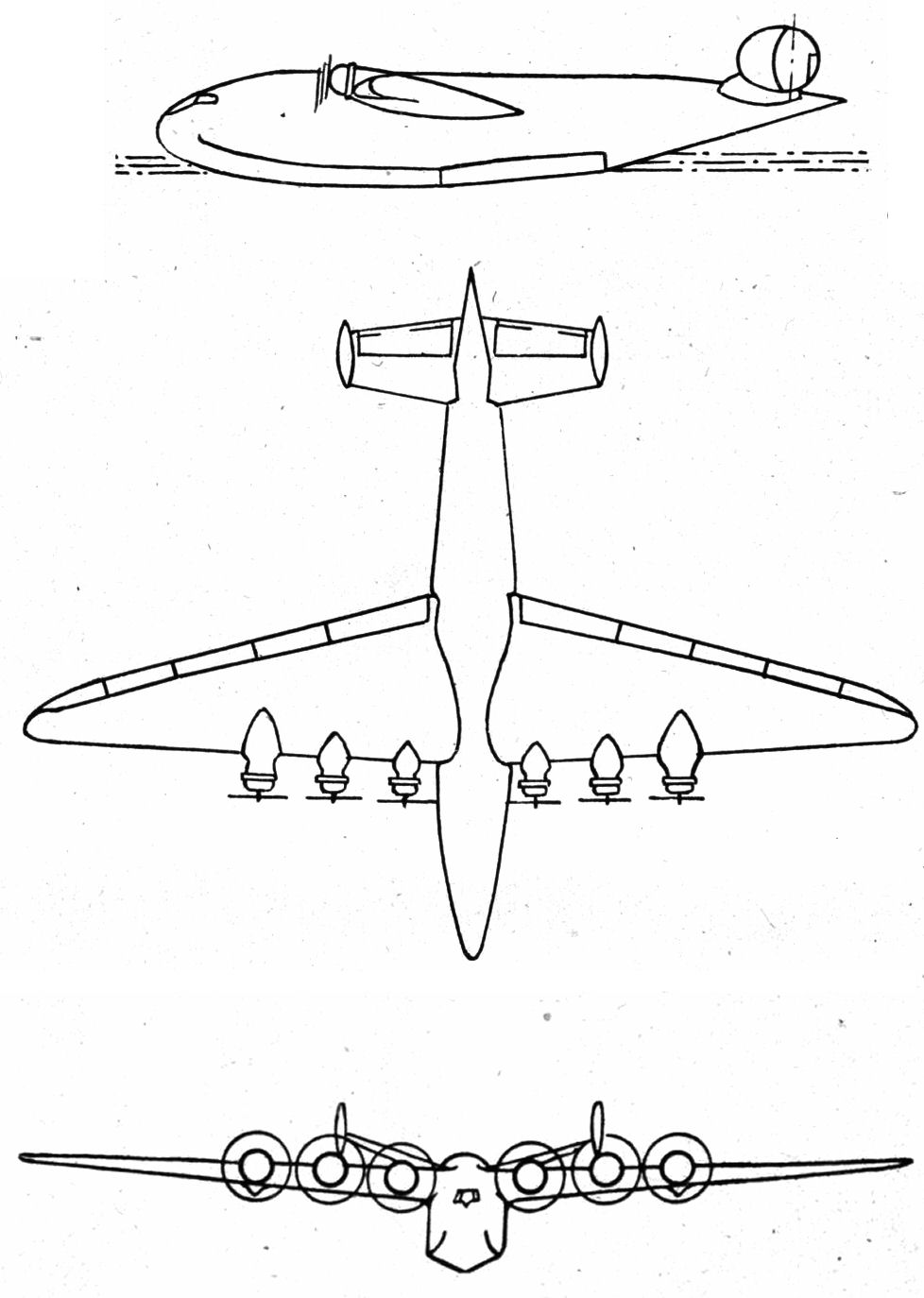
SNCASE SE-200 three-view drawing from L'Aerophile September 1945

Data from Jane's All the World's Aircraft 1947

General characteristics

- Crew: 8-10 (including cabin crew)
- Capacity: Up to 80 passengers (or up to 40 passengers in a sleeper configuration)
- Length: 40.15 m (131 ft 9 in)
- Wingspan: 52.2 m (171 ft 3 in)
- Height: 9.73 m (31 ft 11 in)
- Wing area: 340 m^{2} (3,700 sq ft)
- Airfoil:
  - Root: NACA 2418
  - Tip: NACA 2409
- Empty weight: 32,746 kg (72,193 lb)
- Gross weight: 72,000 kg (158,733 lb)
- Fuel capacity: 38,000 L (10,000 US gal; 8,400 imp gal) in inter-spar wing tanks
- Powerplant: 3 × Gnome-Rhône 14R-26 14 cylinder air-cooled two-row radial piston engine, 1,200 kW (1,600 hp) each for take-off; LH rotation (fitted to starboard)
- Powerplant: 3 × Gnome-Rhône 14R-27 14 cylinder air-cooled two-row radial piston engine, 1,200 kW (1,600 hp) each for take-off; RH rotation (fitted to port)
- Propellers: 3-bladed variable-pitch reversible propellers

Performance

- Maximum speed: 305 km/h (190 mph, 165 kn) at 2,500 m (8,200 ft)
- Cruise speed: 235 km/h (146 mph, 127 kn)
- Range: 6,060 km (3,770 mi, 3,270 nmi) maximum in 60 km/h (37 mph) headwind
- Service ceiling: 5,000 m (16,000 ft)
- Rate of climb: 3.7 m/s (730 ft/min)
- Wing loading: 212 kg/m^{2} (43 lb/sq ft)
- Power/mass: 12.2 kg/kW (20 lb/hp) (at 984 kW (1,320 hp) per engine)

== See also ==
Aircraft of comparable role, configuration, and era

- Latécoère 631
- Saunders-Roe Princess
- Short Shetland

Related lists

- List of aircraft of World War II
- List of flying boats and floatplanes
