= Flight 72 =

Flight 72 or Flight 072 may refer to:

- Air France Flight 072, went missing on 1 August, 1948
- Gulf Air Flight 072, crashed on 23 August, 2000
- Qantas Flight 72, made emergency landing on 7 October, 2008
