= Mulot AM.20 =

1930s Belgian aerobatic trainer aircraft

Mulot AM-20

General information
- Type: Aerobatic trainer
- National origin: Belgium
- Manufacturer: SABCA
- Designer: Maurice Mulot
- Number built: 2

History
- First flight: c.1937

The Mulot AM-20 was a Belgian single seat aerobatic trainer displayed at the 1937 Brussels Salon. Two were built.

== Design and development ==
The 1937 AM-20 was the outcome of a long series of poorly recorded modifications of a Mulot sesquiplane sport design, begun in about 1925 with an 18 hp (13 kW) engine; in 1937 Les Ailes noted that its immediate predecessor had been flying without problems for three years.

Like its predecessors, it was a sesquiplane, with a lower wing providing only a fifth of the total area and with just over half the upper span. It was an all wood aircraft with wings built around spruce and plywood box spars, two in the one-piece upper wing and one in the lower. The upper leading edges were ply-skinned ahead, with fabric covering aft but the lower was entirely ply-skinned. The upper wing was rectangular in plan out to long, elliptical tips and, unlike the lower, was set with light dihedral. In front views the interplane struts presented as W-form with the outer elements formed from V-struts and the inner ones single struts to the upper fuselage. There was also a low cabane formed by a pair of transverse V-struts. Long ailerons filled most of the upper trailing edges.

The AM-20 was designed to be powered by one of two air-cooled, in-line engines, an inverted, six cylinder, 60 hp (45 kW) Train 6T or an upright, four cylinder 85 hp (63 kW) Cirrus Minor. The plywood-covered fuselage had an elliptical cross-section, formed with three longerons and ply frames. Its single, open cockpit was just below the wing trailing edge, where a shallow cut-out enhanced upward visibility. The fuselage ended with an integral fin carrying a balanced rudder and a tailplane mounted at mid fuselage height. The fabric-covered tail surfaces were roughly triangular in plan and profile.

The AM-20 had a conventional, fixed undercarriage with a track of 2.10 m (6.9 ft). Its wheels were on a split axle attached to the fuselage underside on its mid-line and the landing legs, fitted with elastic shock absorbers, were near-vertically mounted on the lower wing spar at the meeting point of the inner and outer interplane struts and braced with forward drag struts. The wheels had helmet-style fairings.

== Operational history ==
The first flight date is not known but, flown or unflown in its latest form, it was on display at the Brussels Salon of 1937. Two Train-powered aircraft were initially on the Belgian civil register, though one had been sold to France before the end of 1937. The other also went to France, though not until after World War II. There, this example was modified into a Cirrus Minor powered two-seater, with the new cockpit under the wing. It first flew in June 1947.

== Variants ==
AM-20
As described, with Train or Cirrus Minor engine.
AM-220
Post-war French rebuild of a Train-powered AM-20 as a two-seater with a Cirrus Minor engine.

== Specifications (AM-20) ==
Data from Les Ailes, August 1937

General characteristics

- Crew: One
- Upper wingspan: 7.40 m (24 ft 3 in)
- Lower wingspan: 3.90 m (12 ft 10 in)
- Wing area: 8.40 m^{2} (90.4 sq ft) upper wing, 2.10 m^{2} (22.6 sq ft) lower
- Empty weight: 310 kg (683 lb)
- Gross weight: 510 kg (1,124 lb)
- Fuel capacity: 150 L (40 US gal; 33 imp gal)
- Powerplant: 1 × Train 6T six cylinder inline inverted air-cooled piston engine, 45–52 kW (60–70 hp)
- Propellers: 2-bladed

Performance

- Maximum speed: 215 km/h (134 mph, 116 kn)
- Cruise speed: 190 km/h (120 mph, 100 kn)
- Take-off distance: 30 m (98 ft)
- Landing speed: 65 km/h (40 mph; 35 kn)
- Landing run: 50–85 m (164–279 ft)
- Range: 1,200 km (750 mi, 650 nmi)
- Service ceiling: 6,100 m (20,000 ft)
