= Potez-CAMS 160 =

Potez 160
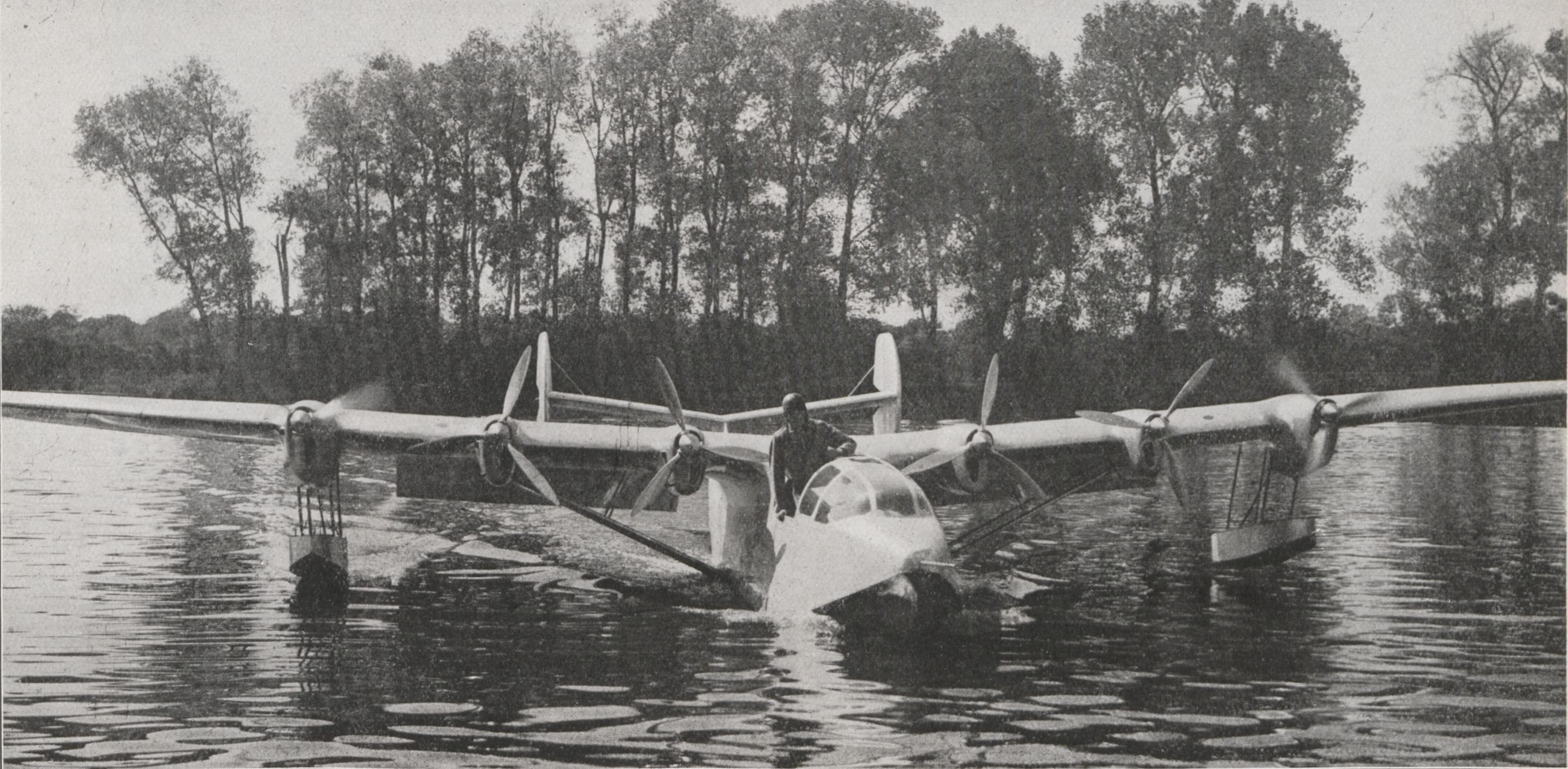

General information
- Type: Experimental scaled flying boat
- National origin: France
- Manufacturer: CAMS
- Number built: 1

History
- First flight: 20 June 1938

The Potez-CAMS 160 was a one-off 5/13 scale flight model built in France, first flown in the summer of 1938 to test aerodynamic and hydrodynamic qualities of the Potez-CAMS 161 airliner and mail carrier, which was too large for detailed modelling in existing wind tunnels.

== Design and development ==
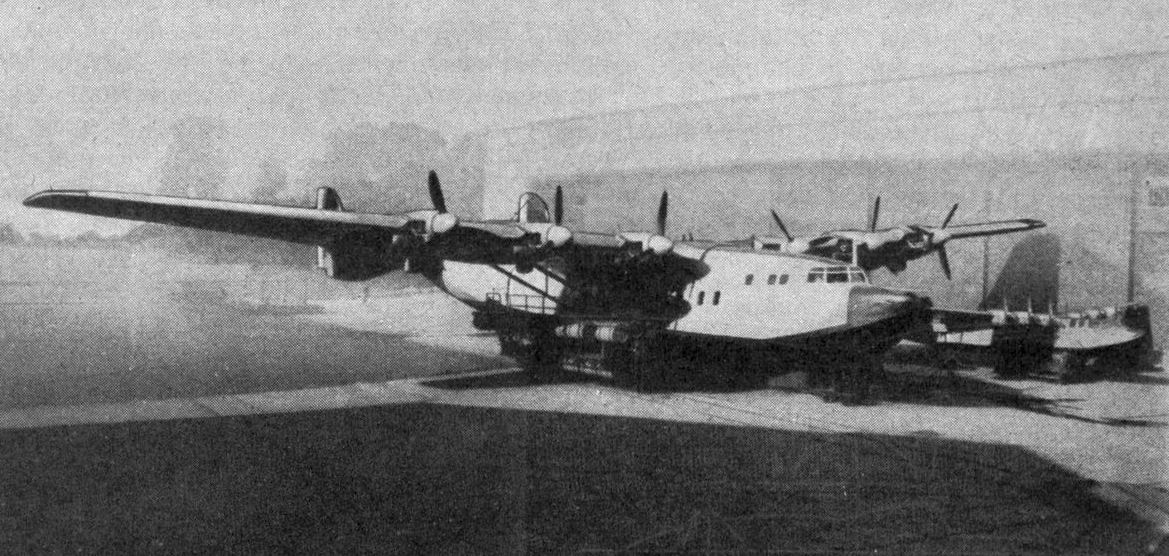
The full size Potez-CAMS 161 flying boat in front of the 160

In 1936 the northern French factories of Potez and of the seaplane maker CAMS, the latter owned by Potez since 1932, were nationalized along with those of Amiot, Breguet and ANF Mureaux into SNCAN. In the same year the design bureau of Potez-CAMS was beginning the development of the Potez-CAMS 161 six engine, trans-Atlantic passenger flying boat, intended to be a key component of Air France's Transatlantique fleet. To test the design they built a 5/13 scale flying scale model of it, careful not just to scale dimensions of the flying surfaces and hull, but also to copy the form the nose around the cabin, engine cowlings and retractable float housings. Control surface detail and the flaps of the 161, together with its variable-pitch propellers, were included on the resulting Potez-CAMS 160. It was intended to prove both the aerodynamic and hydrodynamic behaviour of the airliner. It flew for the first time on 20 June 1938.

The 160 was a high-wing monoplane. The wing was a semi-cantilever structure, with two parallel bracing struts on each side from the lower fuselage to the wing just inside the central engines, straight-edged in plan with taper on the trailing edge only and rounded tips. It was fitted with interconnected Handley Page slots and ailerons as well as split flaps. It was powered by six four-cylinder inverted inline air-cooled Train 4T engines, each producing 30 kW (40 hp) driving three blade, variable-pitch propellers. The engines were mounted on the wing underside, housed in long, narrow cowlings intended to mimic those around the 664 kW (890 hp) Hispano-Suiza 12Ydrs water-cooled V-12 engines of the full scale aircraft.

The little flying boat had a conventional stepped hull and was stabilized on the water by a pair of floats, attached under the outboard engines and retracting into their cowlings. Its enclosed, tandem seat cockpit was shaped to reproduced the form of the 161's nose, though the full sized aircraft had proportionally shorter glazing. The 161 had a twin fin empennage with a N-strut braced, parallel chord tailplane mounted on top of the fuselage on a short pillar with marked dihedral. The fins were of the endplate type, with curved leading edges and roughly symmetric above and below the tailplane; on each, the rudder was split into an upper and lower part. All of these features appeared on the final, full size airliner.

The Potez-CAMS 160 appeared, after its first flight, at the 1938 Paris Aero Show.

== Specifications ==
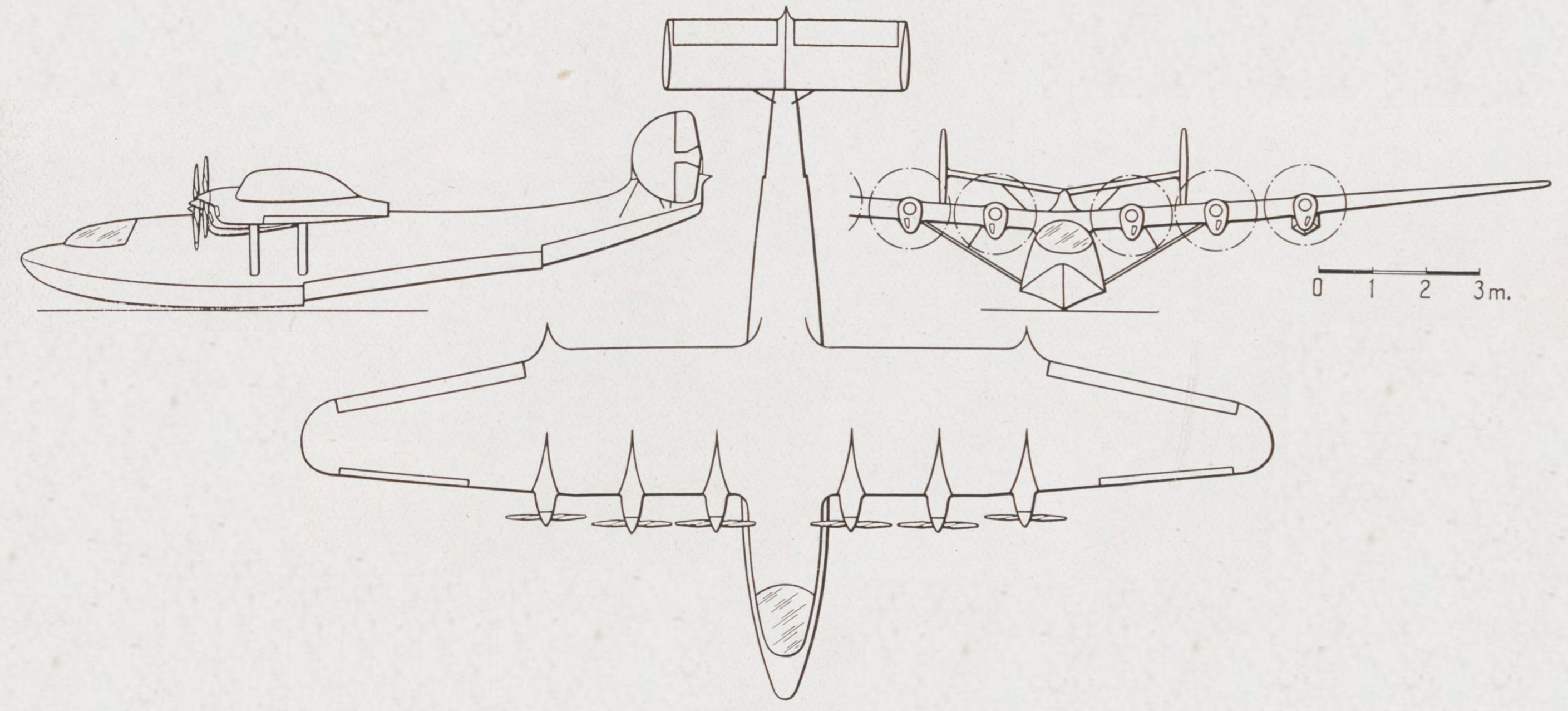
3-views of the Potez-CAMS 160.

Data from Jane's All the World's Aircraft 1938

General characteristics

- Crew: Two, pilot plus observer
- Length: 12.37 m (40 ft 7 in)
- Wingspan: 17.69 m (58 ft 0 in)
- Height: 3.41 m (11 ft 2 in) (Note: Length, span and height from Aviafrance for self-consistency, as Jane's has only span.)
- Wing area: 38.7 m^{2} (417 sq ft)
- Gross weight: 2,275 kg (5,016 lb)
- Powerplant: 6 × Train 4T 4-cylinder air-cooled inverted inline piston engines, 30 kW (40 hp) each
- Propellers: 3-bladed variable pitch

Performance

- Maximum speed: 222 km/h (138 mph, 120 kn) at 950 m (3,120 ft)
- Wing loading: 58.5 kg/m^{2} (12.0 lb/sq ft)
- Power/mass: 75 W/kg (0.047 hp/lb)

== Bibliography ==
Bousquet, Gérard (March 1989). "Le Potez-CAMS 161". Le Fana de l'Aviation (in French) (232): 33–37. ISSN 0757-4169.
