= Tokyo Imperial University LB-2 =

Japanese light civil aircraft

General information
- Type: light civil aircraft
- National origin: Japan
- Manufacturer: Nihon Koku Kogyo KK
- Designer: Prof Hidemasa Kimura (student supervisor)
- Number built: 1

History
- First flight: 18 December 1939

The Tokyo Imperial University LB-2 was a small, single-engined light civil aircraft, designed by students of the Tokyo Imperial University as a two-year project. The sole example first flew in December 1939.

== Design and development ==
The aeronautics divisions of German universities had a tradition of student design projects, often gliders. In 1936 students at the Tokyo Imperial began a similar, two-year project, though for a small two seat powered aircraft. Their first design, the LB-1 (LB for light blue, the school colour), with side-by side seats was abandoned in favour of the LB-2 which had tandem seats.

It was a conventional high wing aircraft, though with an unusually refined wing plan; the inner half was rectangular but the outer panels were pointedly elliptical. Like the rest of the aircraft the wing structure was wooden and its covering fabric. The LB-2 was powered by a 60 hp (45 kW) air-cooled, inverted, six cylinder Train 6C, a French engine which proved unreliable.

Behind the engine the fuselage was flat sided, with an enclosed cabin under the wing. The tail was conventional with its tailplane on top of the fuselage and a triangular fin mounting a rounded rudder. Its conventional undercarriage was fixed, with rather small mainwheels.

After the students' design work was finished most of the LB-2's construction was undertaken by Nihon Koku Kogyo KK, a Yokohama-based company. They completed it in December 1939 and the first flight was made by Shigejiro Takahashi from Haneda Airport on 18 December 1939. The project was judged a success, though the LB-2's flying time was severely limited by the wayward Train engine. Only one was built, as normal with student project aircraft.

== Specifications ==
Data from Japanese Aircraft 1910-1941

General characteristics

- Crew: one
- Capacity: one passenger
- Length: 7.59 m (24 ft 11 in)
- Wingspan: 13 m (42 ft 8 in)
- Height: 3.09 m (10 ft 2 in)
- Wing area: 16 m^{2} (170 sq ft)
- Empty weight: 264 kg (582 lb)
- Gross weight: 460 kg (1,014 lb)
- Powerplant: 1 × Train 6C-01 six cylinder, air-cooled, inverted inline, 45 kW (60 hp)
- Propellers: 2-bladed wooden

Performance

- Maximum speed: 176 km/h (109 mph, 95 kn)
- Cruise speed: 144 km/h (90 mph, 78 kn)
- Range: 564 km (350 mi, 305 nmi)
- Service ceiling: 4,800 m (15,700 ft)
- Rate of climb: 2.9 m/s (570 ft/min) from sea level
