= Carmier-Depuy 10 =

Carmier-Dupuy 10
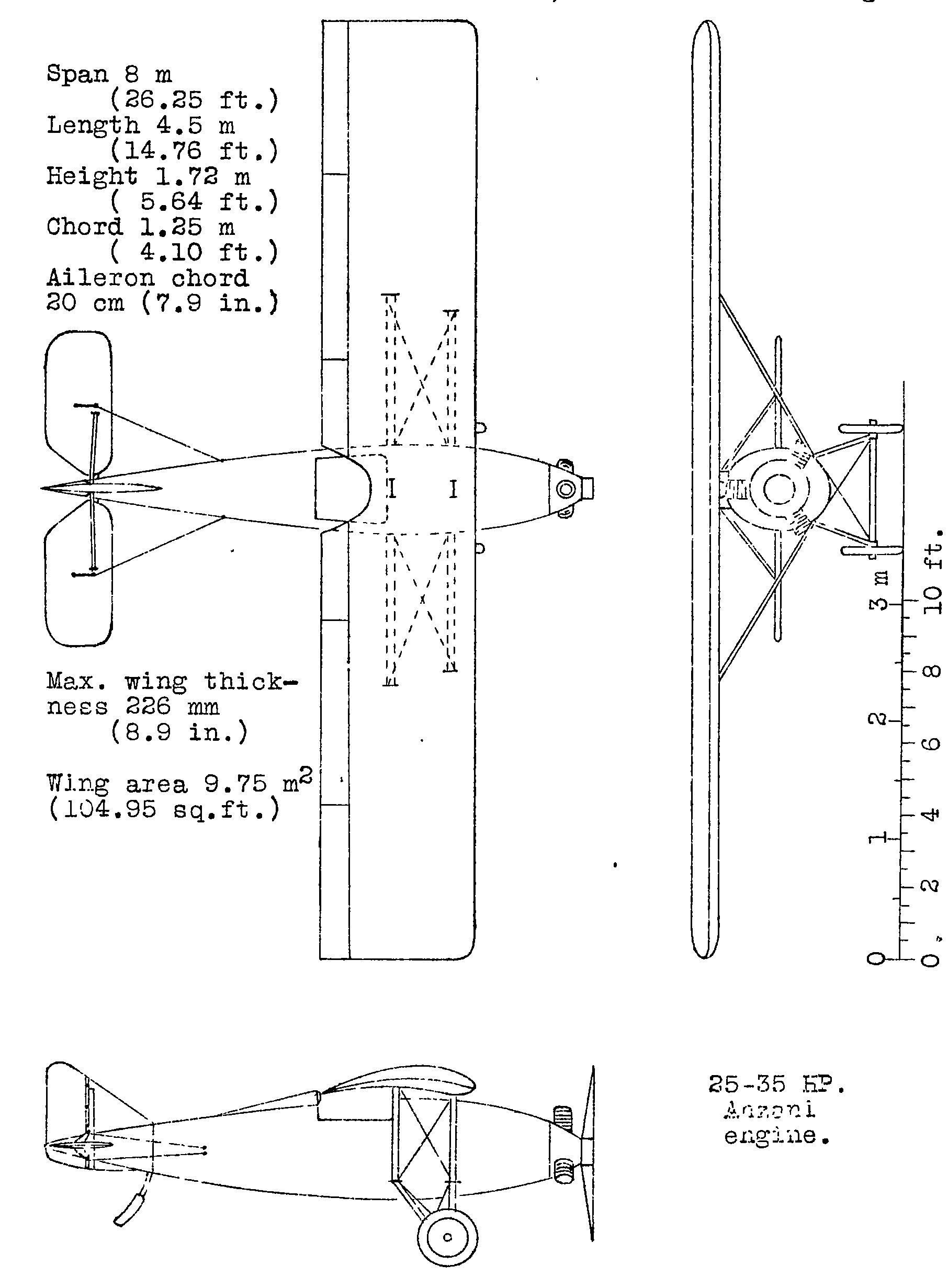

General information
- Type: Low power sports aircraft
- National origin: France
- Designer: Pierre Charmier and Dupuy
- Number built: 1

History
- First flight: Spring 1924

The Charmier-Dupuy 10 was a French parasol-winged single seat light aircraft designed for low-cost flying. The sole example was first flown in 1924. Over a long career, it was fitted with three different engines and remained on the French register until after World War II.

== Design ==
In the early 1920s there was considerable interest in both France and the UK in small single seat aircraft, designed to be cheap to buy and run and thus increase the civil light aircraft market. In France these were often referred to as avionettes; the Carmier avionette, which later was later named the Carmier-Depuy 10 or Carmier T.10 was one example at the high powered end of the range. Charles Carmier was helped in its design by Dupuy and in its construction by an experienced pilot, Chalambel.

The Carmier was a parasol monoplane, with a two-part rectangular plan wing braced to the lower fuselage by pairs of parallel struts out to the spruce wing spars at about 40% span. They were thick in section, with a thickness/chord ratio of 18%, and strongly cambered. The wings were plywood covered and carried full span, narrow ailerons which could operate together as flaps or conventionally.

The fuselage was built around four wooden longerons, though frames and stringers formed a circular cross-section. The covering was in duralumin at the nose and tail, with fabric in the central, cockpit region. The Carmier was initially powered by a three-cylinder, 26 kW (35 hp) Anzani radial engine dating from 1911. The open cockpit was under the trailing edge of the wing, where there was a cut-out to improve upward visibility, and had a long streamlined headrest which topped the fuselage as it tapered strongly to the tail. Mounted at mid-fuselage height, the horizontal tail was all-moving and rectangular in plan apart from a large cut-out for rudder movement. The fin was triangular, with a tall, round tipped, parallel-sided rudder which extended well below the fuselage underside.

The Carmier had fixed, conventional landing gear, with its mainwheels on a single axle mounted via rubber shock absorbers to a pair of cross-braced tube steel V-struts from the lower fuselage. A long tailskid from the fuselage underside was fixed to a lower extension of the rudder hinge, protecting the otherwise-vulnerable rudder.

== Operational history ==
The date of the Carmier's first flight is not known but early development was proceeding in June 1924 at Orly, flown by Paul Carmier, the designer's brother. It was registered as F-EESF. Despite the initial use of a propeller that was not ideally matched to the Anzani engine, it readily climbed to 1,000 m (3,300 ft) and speeds above 115 km/h (71 mph) appear to have been reached.

The Carmier's first competitive event was the Tour de France des avionettes, held in August 1924, for which it was fitted with a larger two litre (120 cubic inch), 34 kW (45 hp) Anzani with a Levasseur propeller. Piloted by Paul Carmier, it was one of only three of fifteen entrants to qualify for the final, three stage event and won the first stage. Carmier was forced to drop out in the second stage by a broken oil pipe.

Two years later, in June 1926, it was flying at Orly in a Civil Pilot's Union event with the same 45 hp engine. A further ten years later, after a period without notable public appearances, it was a contestant in the annual 12 heures d'Angers event in the under two litre category, powered by a 1.08 litre (648 cu in) 20 kW (27 hp) Ava 4A flat-four engine. It did not finish amongst the winners.

In 1936 its engine was changed for the last time, when a 30 kW (40 hp) Train 4T four-cylinder, inverted, air-cooled inline engine was installed. The Carmier survived World War II and was briefly on the French prototypes register as F-WBBG.

== Specifications (T-10 - Train 4A) ==
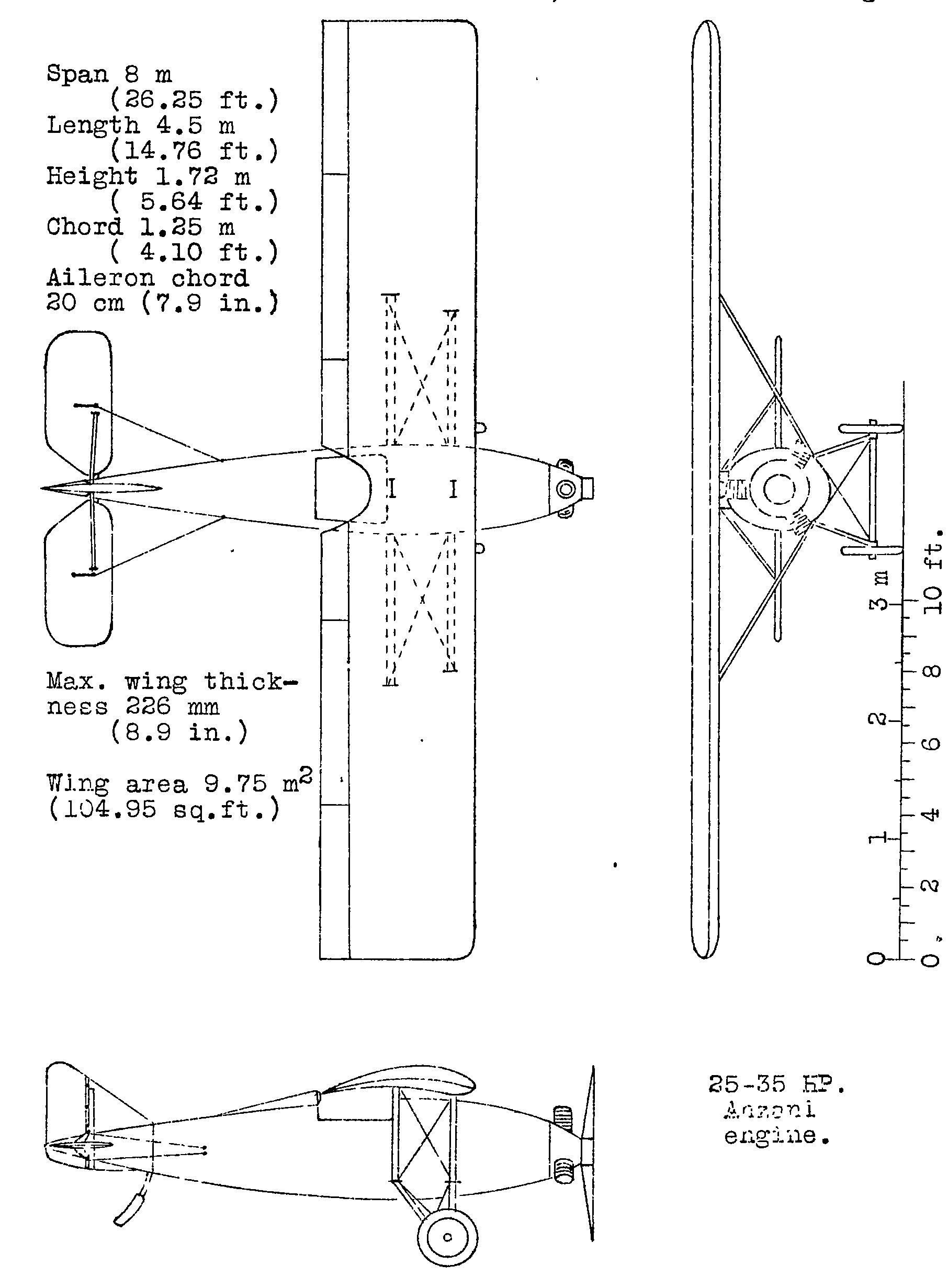
Carmier-Depuy 10 3-view drawing from NACA-TM-301

Data from Les Ailes, June 1924, Jane's all the World's Aircraft 1947

General characteristics

- Crew: One
- Length: 5 m (16 ft 5 in)
- Wingspan: 8 m (26 ft 3 in)
- Height: 1.71 m (5 ft 7 in)
- Wing area: 9.4 m^{2} (101 sq ft)
- Airfoil: Göttingen
- Empty weight: 235 kg (518 lb)
- Gross weight: 375 kg (827 lb)
- Powerplant: 1 × Train 4A 4-cylinder inverted air-cooled in-line piston engine, 30 kW (40 hp) -37.3 kW (50.0 hp)
- Propellers: 2-bladed Merville, 1.6 m (5 ft 3 in) diameter wooden fixed pitch airscrew

Performance

- Maximum speed: 165 km/h (103 mph, 89 kn) at sealevel
- Cruise speed: 144 km/h (89 mph, 78 kn) at 70% power
- Landing speed: 55 km/h (34 mph; 30 kn)
- Range: 520 km (320 mi, 280 nmi)
- Service ceiling: 4,000 m (13,000 ft)
- Rate of climb: 2.50 m/s (492 ft/min)
- Time to altitude: 360 m (1,180 ft) in 2 minutes 30 seconds
- Wing loading: 40 kg/m^{2} (8.2 lb/sq ft)
- Fuel consumption: 0.0658 kg/km (0.233 lb/mi)
- Power/mass: 12.47 kg/kW (20.5 lb/hp)
