= Kellner-Béchereau =

French aircraft manufacturer

Avions Kellner-Béchereau
- Industry: Aeronautics, defence
- Founded: 1931
- Founder: Louis Béchereau
- Defunct: 1942
- Fate: Merged
- Successor: Morane-Saulnier
- Headquarters: Boulogne-Billancourt, France
- Key people: Georges Paulin
- Products: Aircraft

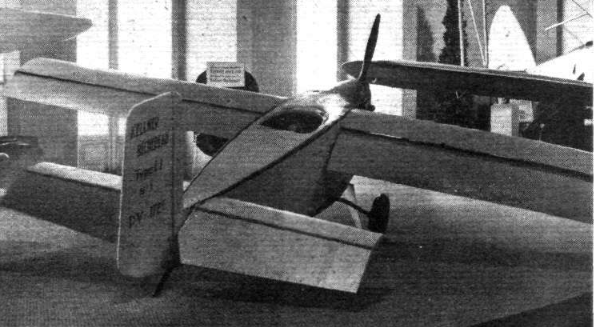
Kellner-Béchereau E.1.

Avions Kellner-Béchereau, known as Kellner-Béchereau, was a French aircraft manufacturer of the early 20th century.

== History ==
The company was founded in 1931 by Louis Béchereau together with the French automobile carriage-builder Jacques Kellner. The factory, located at Boulogne-Billancourt, began building light monoplanes. In 1936–37 Avions Kellner-Béchereau built a short series of small monoplanes exploiting one of Louis Béchereau's patents, a full span lateral division of the wing into two sections forming a "double wing".

The wing was first tested on the single-seat Kellner-Béchereau E.1 on 1936, which was followed by two larger and more powerful two-seaters, the Kellner-Béchereau EC.4 and ED.5. Both of these were designed to meet the French Air Ministry's requirement for a pre-military trainer aircraft to be used by the clubs set up in the "Aviation Populaire" programme. The Kellner-Béchereau designs, however, were not ordered for the Aviation Populaire programme, the Air Ministry opting in favour of the Caudron C.270 and the Salmson Cri-Cri which were both bought in large numbers. Instead, Kellner-Béchereau, along with other manufacturers, built the Cri-Cri under licence.

On the eve of the Second World War, Louis Béchereau conceived a monoplane, the Kellner-Béchereau E.60, also known as K.B.E 60, an embarked monoplane for the aircraft carriers of the French Navy, but its development was frustrated by events.

In 1939 Georges Paulin, who in 1934 had designed the Peugeot 601 Éclipse convertible automobile, joined the aerodynamical department of the Kellner-Béchereau factory. A member of the French Resistance, he was arrested in 1941 and executed the following year. The Kellner-Béchereau factory was destroyed by bombing in 1942 and the Avions Kellner-Béchereau company was subsequently merged with Morane-Saulnier. Louis Béchereau was given a post as a director at Morane-Saulnier until his retirement in 1950.

== Aircraft ==
- Kellner-Béchereau 23
- Kellner-Béchereau 28VD
- Kellner-Béchereau 29
- Kellner-Béchereau 30
- Kellner-Béchereau E.1
- Kellner-Béchereau E.4
- Kellner-Béchereau EC.4
- Kellner-Béchereau ED.5
- Kellner-Béchereau E.5
- Kellner-Béchereau E.60
