= Duverne-Saran 01 =

General information
- Type: 3 seat, twin engine light civil aircraft
- National origin: France
- Number built: 1

History
- First flight: 23 April 1935

The Duverne-Saran 01 was a twin engine, three seat touring aircraft built in France in the mid-1930s. Only one was completed.

== Design ==
The Duverne-Saran 01 was designed to carry a pilot and two passengers rapidly but economically with the extra security provided by two engines. It was a wooden aircraft with a low, cantilever wing set with about 6° of dihedral. The wing was in three parts, with a short span, constant chord centre section and two straight-tapered, square-tipped outer panels. Long ailerons on the outer panels occupied about 60% of the span. There were split flaps on either side of the ailerons. Structurally the wings had a box spar, shaping the section and plywood covered; the section aft of the box was formed by ribs and was fabric covered.

The Duverne-Saran 01's engines were mounted from the wing at the junctions between the centre section and outer panels. The 30 kW (40 hp) Chaise 4-E engines were air-cooled, inverted V-4s with a narrow angle between the cylinders, so were unusually compact. The propeller shafts were at wing level, with the bulk of the engine and cowlings ahead and below the wing.

Its fuselage was built around four spruce longerons and was rectangular in section. The extreme nose was a duralumin dome, the central region was ply covered and fabric covered the tapering rear section. Its three seats were in tandem, with the pilot in front over the wing leading edge, a passenger behind over the centre of gravity and a third seat, which could be fitted with dual control, in the rear. A windowed cabin top was envisaged but does not appear in the few published photographs of the Duverne-Saran, so it may not have been fitted. The fuselage design made it easy to modify; for example, a hinged panel in the side could admit patients on a stretcher.

The tail was conventional with a trapezoidal tailplane mounted on the upper fuselage carrying rectangular elevators. The angle of incidence of the tailplane could be adjusted in flight for trim but the elevators were not balanced. The Duverne-Saran had a triangular fin and rectangular balanced rudder.

It had a fixed tailskid undercarriage with mainwheels on faired half-axles from the bottom of the fuselage, with short, faired, rubber ring shock absorbers from the outer lower engine mounts.

== Development ==
The Duverne-Saran 01, prototype and only example of the type, flew for the first time on 23 April 1935. It was one of sixteen prototypes that took part in a 2,140 km (1,330 mi), ten-day tour around France which started at Orly on 18 October 1935.

On 28 April 1936 it arrived at Villacoublay for its official trials. At that time it still had the Chaise engines but by March 1937 these had been replaced with 45 kW (60 hp) Train 6T straight six cylinder, inverted, air-cooled engines. It first flew with these early in May 1937 and trials continued until at least October.

In December 1937 it changed engines again, with the installation of smaller, 30 kW (40 hp) Train 4Ts, similar to the 6Ts but with four cylinders, in order to make record attempts in the low power category.

A year later, in December 1938 the Duverne-Saran had begun tests powered by two 52 kW (70 hp) air-cooled [Minié 4.D0 Horus flat fours.

== Specifications (Chaise engine) ==
Data from Les Ailes 26 September 1926

General characteristics

- Crew: One pilot
- Capacity: two passengers
- Length: 9.40 m (30 ft 10 in)
- Wingspan: 13.50 m (44 ft 3 in)
- Height: 2.20 m (7 ft 3 in)
- Wing area: 25.40 m^{2} (273.4 sq ft)
- Empty weight: 600 kg (1,323 lb)
- Gross weight: 1,050 kg (2,315 lb)
- Fuel capacity: 62 L (14 imp gal; 16 US gal)
- Powerplant: 2 × Chaise 4-E air-cooled inverted V-4 engine, geared down 2:1, 30 kW (40 hp) each at 2,500 rpm
- Propellers: 2-bladed Chauvière, wooden blades

Performance

- Maximum speed: 170 km/h (110 mph, 92 kn)
- Cruise speed: 150 km/h (93 mph, 81 kn)
- Range: 1,000 km (620 mi, 540 nmi)
- Service ceiling: 6,200 m (20,300 ft) absolute
- Landing speed: 45 km/h (28 mph)
