= Nicolas-Claude NC-2 Aquilon =

1930s French aircraft

General information
- Type: Tourism
- Manufacturer: Nicolas-Claude
- Number built: 1

History
- First flight: 5 April 1937

The Nicolas-Claude NC-2 Aquilon was a single-seat touring aircraft built in the late 1930s, featuring a low-wing monoplane with canard foreplanes. The NC-2 was first flown on 5 April 1937 at Auxerre.

== Specifications (NC-2 Aquilon) ==
Data from

General characteristics

- Length: 4.3 m (14 ft 1 in)
- Wingspan: 7 m (23 ft 0 in)
- Wing area: 14 m^{2} (150 sq ft)
- Empty weight: 183 kg (403 lb)
- Gross weight: 410 kg (904 lb)
- Powerplant: 1 × Train 4T 4-cylinder inverted air-cooled in-line piston engine, 37 kW (50 hp)
- Propellers: 2-bladed fixed-pitch propeller

Performance

- Maximum speed: 175 km/h (109 mph, 94 kn)
- Cruise speed: 130 km/h (81 mph, 70 kn)
- Stall speed: 50 km/h (31 mph, 27 kn)
- Range: 850 km (530 mi, 460 nmi)
- Service ceiling: 4,000 m (13,000 ft)
- Wing loading: 29.2 kg/m^{2} (6.0 lb/sq ft)
