= Kellner-Béchereau 23 =

General information
- Type: Touring aircraft
- National origin: France
- Manufacturer: Kellner-Béchereau
- Number built: 1

History
- First flight: 1932

The Kellner-Béchereau 23 was a French two seat cabin touring aircraft, built in 1932. Its wing was constructed in a novel way. Only one was completed.

== Design ==
The Kellner-Béchereau 23 was the first aircraft known as a Kellner-Béchereau (the company was founded in 1931), though the only example built (F-AKGH) was originally marked as the Béchereau 23.

It was a single engine cabin aircraft with an all-metal, three part cantilever wing constructed in a novel way. In place of spars, an approximately oval section, light metal tube, shaped around a wooden form which was then removed, provided both structural strength and formed the outer skin of the forward half of the wing. A more conventional lattice structure was attached to the rear of the tube and supported ailerons. The whole wing was then fabric covered.

In plan, the wing was approximately elliptical. The centre section, occupying about 20% of the span, was built into the fuselage and the outer panels tapered rapidly to pointed tips. The wings also tapered in section; the upper surface was horizontal but the lower sloped upwards, providing about 5° dihedral at the centreline. Their trailing edges were entirely filled with two-part, high aspect ratio ailerons.

Its flat-sided cross-section fuselage was built around four spruce longerons, transversely braced with steel tubes. They supported a light, fabric covered body formed with plywood frames and stringers. The 71 kW (95 hp) Salmson 7AC, a seven-cylinder radial engine, was in a pointed nose with its cylinders exposed for cooling. Its fuel tanks were in the wing centre-section. The tourer's cabin seated two in tandem under a long, multi-part, fully glazed canopy which ran from the leading edge to mid-chord, then blended without change in height into the upper fuselage. The cabin had two small baggage holds in the centre wing section, each providing 0.1125 m^{3} (3.97 cu ft) of space.

The empennage of the Kellner-Béchereau 23 was conventional, with a triangular tailplane mounted on the upper fuselage and carrying narrow, rounded elevators was wire braced to the blunted triangular fin which carried a curved and narrow unbalanced rudder. The tourer had a fixed tailwheel undercarriage with independent mainwheels on hinged V-struts from the fuselage underside and near-vertical sprung legs, with Béchereau shock absorbers, from the wings. The mainwheels, with a track of 2.80 m (9 ft 2 in), were equipped with independent brakes. At the rear the sprung tailwheel was free to castor.

== Operational history ==
The date of the Kellner-Béchereau 23's first flight is not known but by early September 1932 it was sufficiently developed to begin its official tests with the S.T. Aé at Villacoublay, flown by Seitz. These were resumed in December. In September 1933 it was one of the eleven aircraft in the third annual, eight day Tour de France des avions prototypes.

== Specifications ==
Data from Les Ailes July 1932

General characteristics

- Crew: One
- Capacity: One passenger
- Length: 8.74 m (28 ft 8 in)
- Wingspan: 14.0 m (45 ft 11 in)
- Height: 2.164 m (7 ft 1 in)
- Wing area: 23.10 m^{2} (248.6 sq ft)
- Empty weight: 565 kg (1,246 lb)
- Gross weight: 860 kg (1,896 lb)
- Fuel capacity: 80 kg (180 lb)
- Powerplant: 1 × Salmson 7AC 7-cylinder air-cooled radial, 71 kW (95 hp)
- Propellers: 2-bladed Levasseur, 2.16 m (7 ft 1 in) diameter metal

Performance

- Maximum speed: 164 km/h (102 mph, 89 kn)
- Cruise speed: 123 km/h (76 mph, 66 kn)
- Range: 300 km (190 mi, 160 nmi)
- Service ceiling: 7,950 m (26,080 ft)
- Time to altitude: 45 min to 6,555 m (21,506 ft)
- Take-off distance: 145 m (476 ft)
- Landing distance: 140 m (460 ft)
