= Régnier 12 =

General information
- Type: Two seat touring aircraft
- National origin: Belgium
- Manufacturer: Ateliers Mulot
- Designer: Carlos Régnier
- Number built: 1

History
- First flight: August 1936-April 1937

The Régnier 12 was a 1930s Belgian touring aircraft offering variants with different engines and seating plans. Only one was built.

== Design ==
Carlos Régnier (no relation of the aircraft engine builder) intended that his low wing monoplane would be capable of carrying two, three or four people, using a variety of engines with powers in the range 75–134 kW (100–180 hp). The prototype and only example built was a side-by-side two-seater.

The Régnier 12's wing was in three parts with a short span, rectangular plan centre section and almost triangular plan outer panels, strongly tapered with a tip angle of about 20°. The outer panels had a dihedral of 4.5°. The wing was built around two wooden box spars; its ribs were also wooden and the skin was birch plywood. Long ailerons filled much of the outer panels' trailing edges.

Like the wings the fuselage was wooden, with four longerons defining its flat-sided form; it, too, had stressed birch ply skin. A 30 kW (40 hp) Train 4T four-cylinder, air-cooled, inverted straight engine drove a two-blade propeller. The two occupants sat side by side in an open cockpit, fitted with dual control, over the wing. Its empennage was conventional, with a horizontal tail mounted on top of the fuselage and strongly straight-tapered like the wing. The elevators were inset and separate, with a gap between them to allow the movement of a deep, balanced rudder mounted on a small fin. The construction of the rear surfaces was similar to that of the wings.

The Régnier 12 had a wide track, conventional undercarriage. Each mainwheel was at the end of a vertical oleo strut mounted on the forward wing spar, together with a rearward drag strut to the lower fuselage longeron. Its steel tailskid had two coil springs.

== Development ==
The Régnier 12 was registered as OO-REG on 8 August 1936; the date of its first flight is not known, though tests with an unknown type of 20 kW (27 hp) engine had started before May 1937. It appears that the Train engine was fitted by the time of the 1st Brussels Aero Salon in late May 1937. By July 1937 it had been flown solo by its designer, a pilot with only ten hours experience.

== Specifications (Train 4T) ==
Data from Les Ailes 10 June 1937

General characteristics

- Length: 7.65 m (25 ft 1 in)
- Wingspan: 11.60 m (38 ft 1 in)
- Height: 2.10 m (6 ft 11 in)
- Wing area: 15.20 m^{2} (163.6 sq ft)
- Empty weight: 290 kg (639 lb)
- Gross weight: 490 kg (1,080 lb)
- Powerplant: 1 × Train 4T 4-cylinder air-cooled inverted inline, 30 kW (40 hp)
- Propellers: 2-bladed

Performance

- Maximum speed: 155 km/h (96 mph, 84 kn)
- Cruise speed: 135 km/h (84 mph, 73 kn)
- Range: 400 km (250 mi, 220 nmi)
- Service ceiling: 4,000 m (13,000 ft)
- Landing speed: 55–60 km/h (34–37 mph)
