= Latécoère 631 =

French flying boat airliner with 6 piston engines, 1942

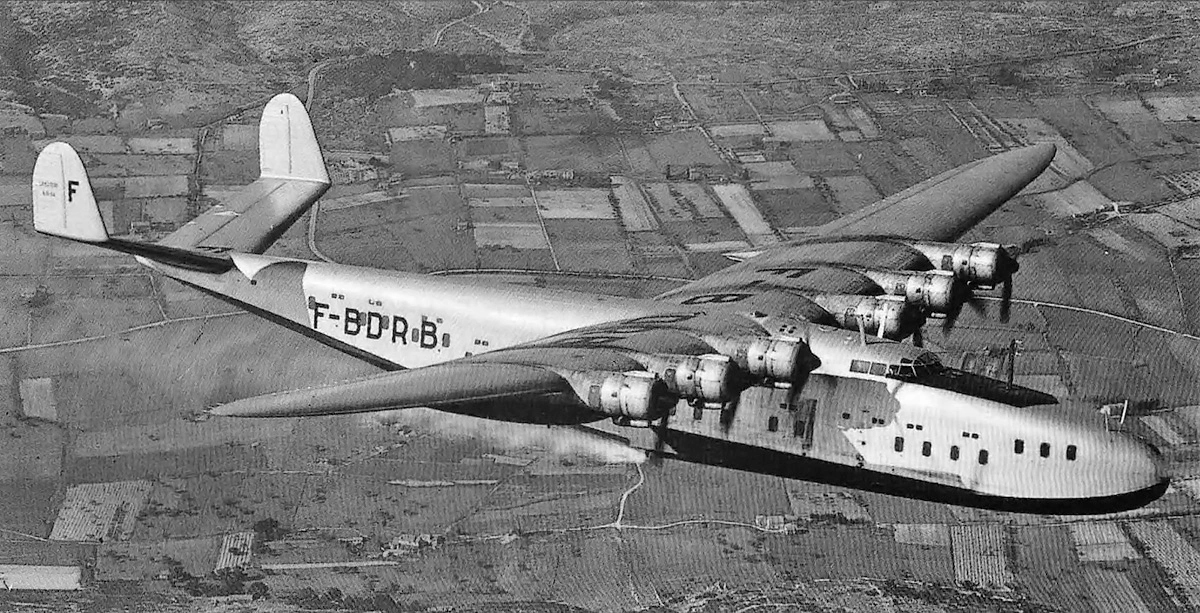
- Latécoère 631 in flight, 1947

General information
- Type: Flying boat
- National origin: France
- Manufacturer: Latécoère
- Designer: Pierre-Georges Latécoère
- Number built: 10 (Plus the prototype)

History
- First flight: 4 November 1942
- In service: 1947–1955

The Latécoère 631 was a civil transatlantic flying boat designed and produced by the French aircraft manufacturer Latécoère. At the time of its maiden flight, it was the largest flying boat to have ever been built.

The Latécoère 631 was designed in response to a specification for a transatlantic passenger aircraft to be operated by flag carrier Air France; it was the largest and heaviest of three flying boats (the others being the SE.200 Amphitrite and the Potez-CAMS 161) that were designed to fulfil this requirement. Along with all-metal construction and an unconventional V-tail, the Latécoère 631 was originally intended to be powered by six Gnome-Rhône 18P radial engines; however, the type was typically powered by six Wright GR-2600-A5B Twin Cyclone 14-cylinder radial engines instead.

While the Latécoère 631 was ordered in 1938, its construction was disrupted by the outbreak of World War II one year later. The prototype made its fight flight on 4 November 1942; having demonstrated strong performance, decision makers were convinced to put the Latécoère 631 into production in 1944. Accordingly, in July 1947, the type started flying transatlantic routes for Air France, as had been originally intended for the type. However, the Latécoère 631 was not typically regarded as a success, proving to be both unreliable and uneconomic to operate. It was withdrawn from service after a series of fatal accidents. Five of the eleven aircraft built were written off in accidents and one was lost during World War II.

== Design and development ==
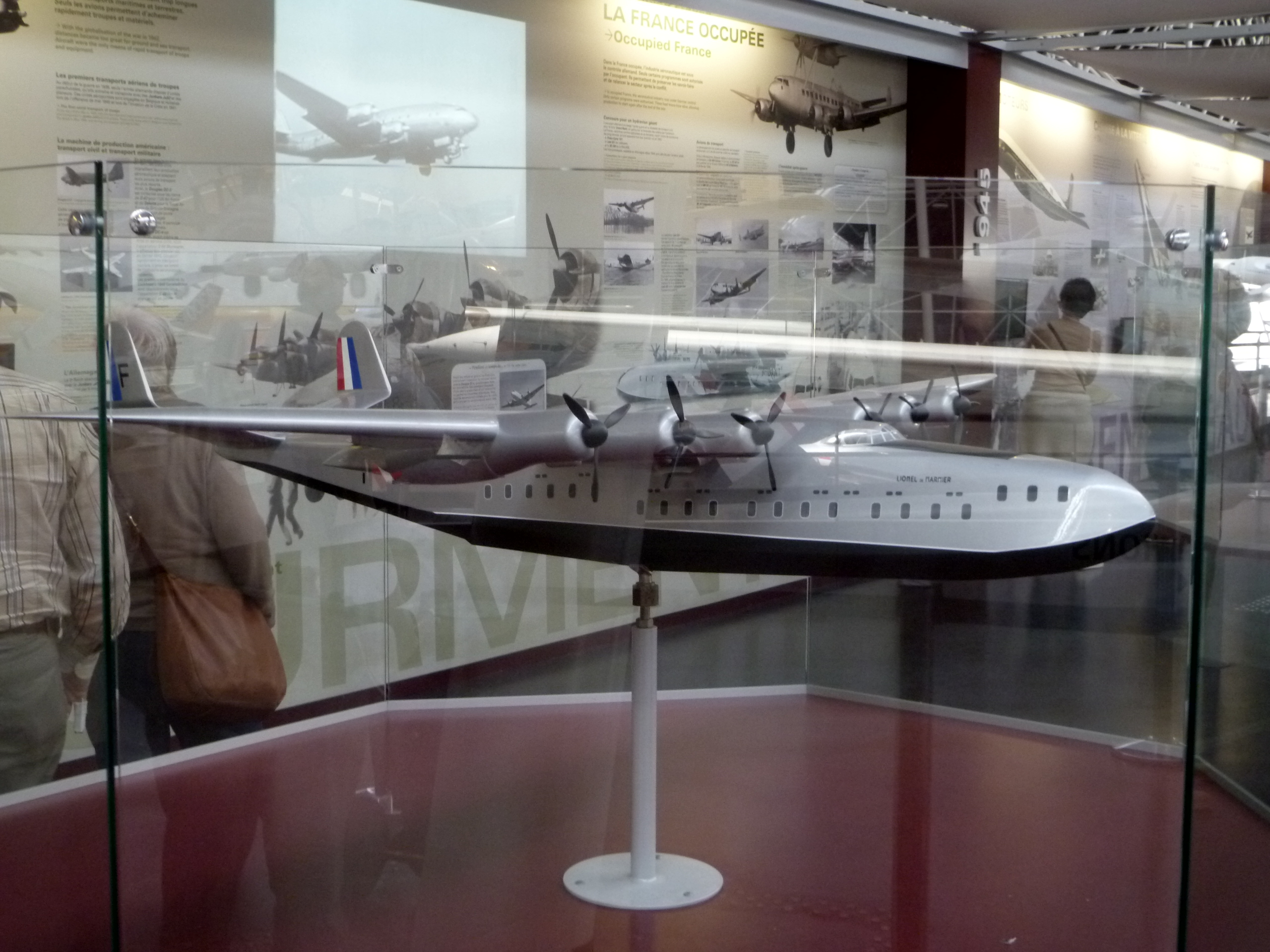
Model of Latécoère 631 at Aeroscopia, Toulouse

The origins of the Latécoère 631 can be traced back to 1936 and the issuing of a specification by the French Air Ministry that sought a new transatlantic airliner to be operated by the national flag carrier Air France; the prospective aircraft was to possess a range of 6,000 km (3,700 mi) as well as a capacity for up to 20 passengers and 500 kg of cargo. This high-profile specification quickly attracted the attention of various French aircraft manufacturers, including Lioré et Olivier and Potez-CAMS (which would submit their SE.200 Amphitrite and the Potez-CAMS 161 respectively); Latécoère was another firm that opted to produce a response. Designated as the Latécoère 631, it was both the largest and heaviest of the three flying boats designed to meet the specification. It featured all metal construction, an unorthodox V-tail arrangement, and stabilising floats that retracted into the nacelles of the outboard engines as to minimise drag, akin to the earlier Latécoère 611.

The Latécoère 631 was ordered in 1938, at which point it was intended for the flying boat to be powered by six Gnome-Rhône 18P radial engines, each capable of producing up to 1,650 hp (1,230 kW). During the following year, the first passenger flight across the Atlantic was flown by a competing flying boat, the Dixie Clipper; around this time, large flying boats were opening up long distance passenger and mail routes all over the world.

The outbreak of World War II would prove decisive to the future of the Latécoère 631; flying boats were turned to military purposes while developments made during the conflict substantially reshaped post-war air travel. Specifically, construction of the Latécoère 631 was temporarily halted shortly after the conflict broke out, but it was resumed shortly after the signing of the Franco-German Armistice in 1940. Final assembly of the first prototype was undertaken in a hangar at Marignane.

On 4 November 1942, the prototype, registered F-BAHG, performed its maiden flight. During its test flights, the flying boat reportedly exhibited favourable flight and seaworthiness characteristics in addition to the fulfilment of the specification's performance stipulations. One issue observed was an occasional vibration in the outermost portion of the wings. The prototype was subsequently confiscated by the Germans, and passed to the Luftwaffe, who allocated the codes 61+11 to it. The aircraft was flown to Lake Constance, where it was destroyed in an attack by two RAF Mosquito aircraft on 17 April 1944. One month later, France's provisional government, then based in Algiers, decided to pursue serial production of the Latécoère 631 once conditions were right to do so. Latécoère allegedly worked with the French Resistance to conceal components for a second aircraft from the German occupation forces.

== Operational history ==
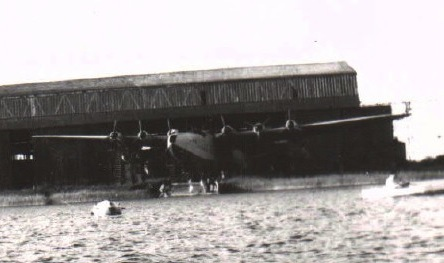
Latécoère 631 at the wharf of Biscarrosse lake

The second aircraft, F-BANT, first flew on 7 March 1945. It was powered by six Wright R-2600 Cyclone engines of 1,600 horsepower (1,200 kW) each. Four aircraft were purchased by Air France, and entered service on the Biscarrosse-Port-Étienne-Fort de France route in July 1947. The aircraft were withdrawn from service in August 1948 following the loss of F-BDRC. SEMAF operated two aircraft until 1950, when the survivor was withdrawn following the loss of F-WANU. The Société France Hydro operated one aircraft until it was lost on 10 September 1955. This was the last flying aircraft, with the remaining four survivors being scrapped. The Latécoère 631 had quickly become undesirable to operators, largely as a result of it being both unreliable and uneconomic to operate.

== Operators ==
Data from Aeroplane Monthly 2014

- Air France.
- (France) Latécoère.
- (France) SEMAF.
- Société France-Hydro.
- Luftwaffe.

== Accidents and incidents ==
17 April 1944
The Latécoère 631 prototype (F-BAHG; 61+11) was destroyed in an attack by two RAF Mosquito aircraft. SNCASE SE.200 Amphitrite 20+01 was destroyed in the same attack.

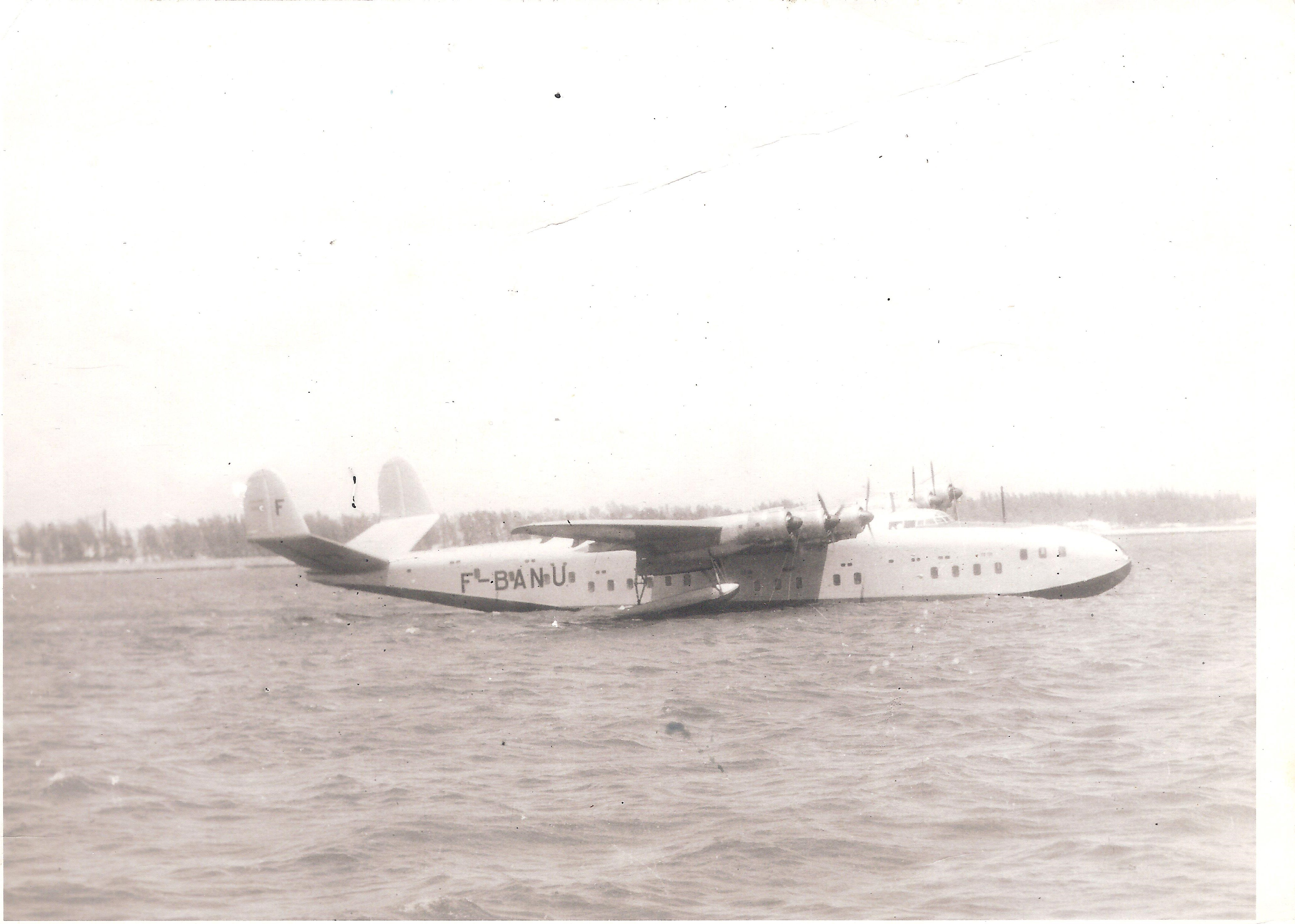
Latécoère 631 F-BANU Henri Guillaumet Dakar 1947

31 October 1945
An Air France Latécoère 631 (F-BANT) was operating a flight from Rio de Janeiro, Brazil, to Montevideo, Uruguay, and Buenos Aires, Argentina, when the propeller of No. 3 engine separated in flight and debris struck the No. 2 engine. A propeller blade sliced a 3 metres (9.8 ft) hole in the cabin, killing two passengers. A small fire started and an emergency landing was made in the Laguna de Rocha, Uruguay. The aircraft was subsequently repaired and returned to service. The poet, diplomat and composer Vinicius de Moraes and writer Rubem Braga, both Brazilians, were on board.
21 February 1948
A Latécoère 631 (F-BDRD) was on a delivery flight from Le Havre, Seine-Maritime, to Biscarrosse, Landes when it crashed into the English Channel off Saint-Marcouf, Manche, in a snowstorm with the loss of all nineteen people on board. The aircraft lacked any ice protection system.

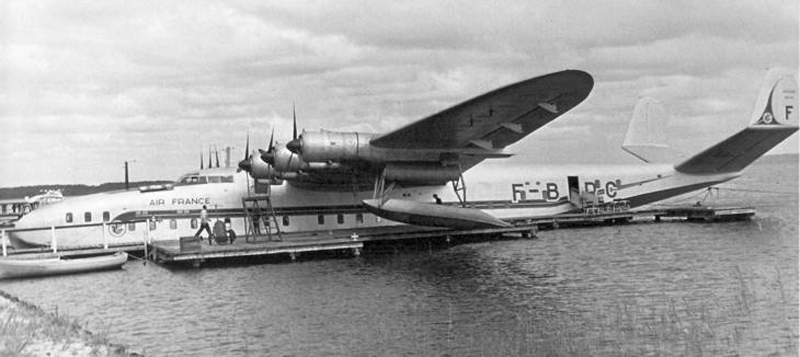
Air France Latécoère 631 F-BDRC

1 August 1948
Air France Flight 072 (F-BDRC) ditched in the Atlantic Ocean for reasons unknown with the loss of all 52 people on board. The aircraft was operating a flight from Fort-de-France, Martinique, to Port-Étienne (now Nouadhibou), Mauritania. Following this loss, the Latécoère 631 was withdrawn from service by Air France. The United States Coast Guard ship USCGC Campbell reported finding debris on August 4 but no sign of survivors.
28 March 1950
A SEMAF Latécoère 631 (F-WANU) crashed into the Atlantic Ocean off Cap Ferret, Gironde, after the aileron control couplings failed due to severe vibration in one of the engines' gearboxes with the loss of all twelve people on board. The aircraft was on a test flight from Biscarrosse to determine the cause of the crash of Air France Flight 072.
10 September 1955
A France-Hydro Latécoère 631 (F-BDRE) suffered wing separation (probably due to wind shear) after flying into a tropical storm, and crashed 38 mi north of Banyo, French Cameroon, killing all 16 on board. The aircraft was on a flight from Lac Lérè, Chad, to Douala, French Cameroon (now Cameroon), en route to Biscarrosse for maintenance.

== Specifications (Latécoère 631) ==
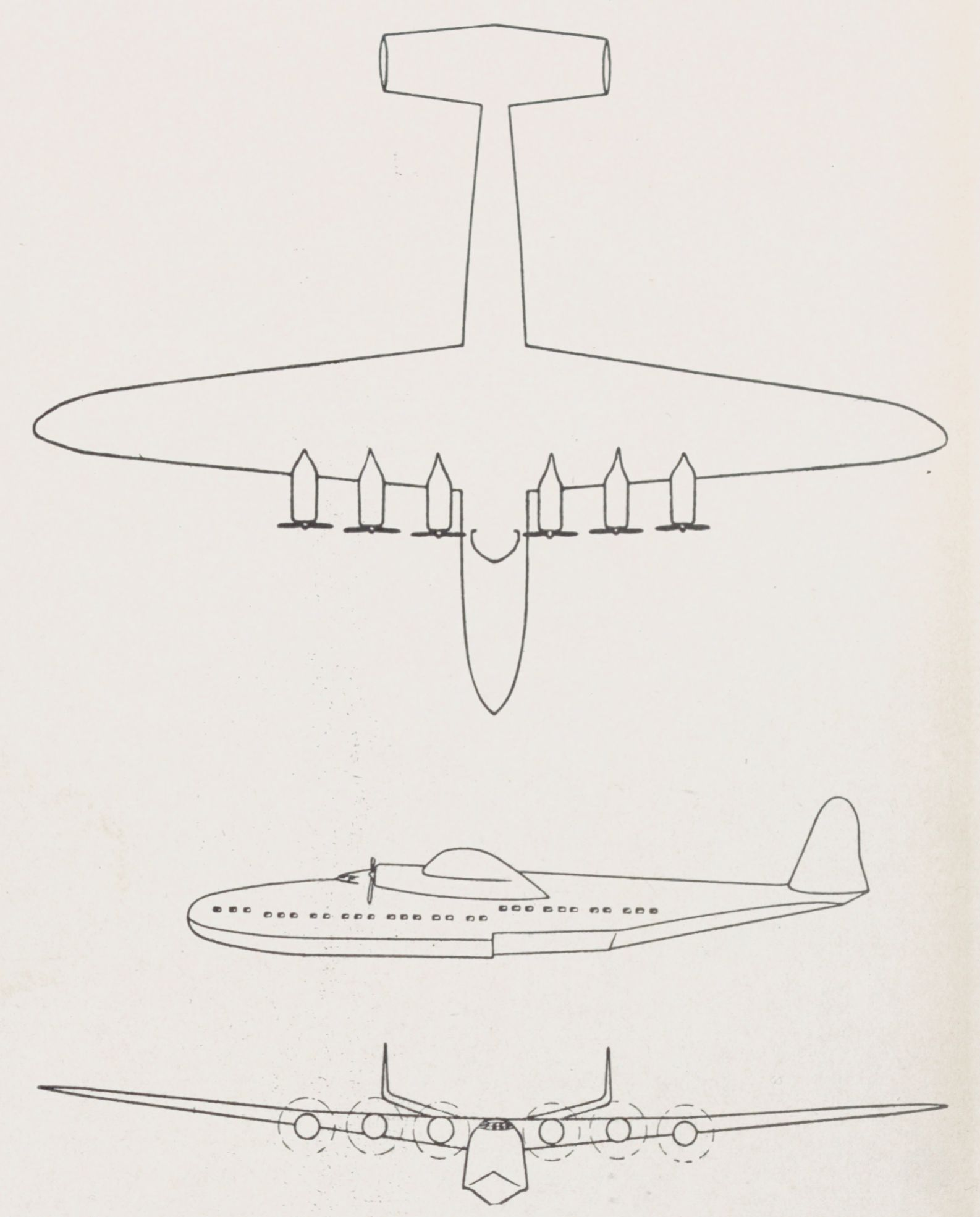
Latécoère 631

Data from World Encyclopedia of Civil Aircraft; Old Machine Press

General characteristics

- Crew: five
- Capacity: 46 passengers
- Length: 43.46 m (142 ft 7 in)
- Wingspan: 57.43 m (188 ft 5 in)
- Height: 10.35 m (33 ft 11 in)
- Wing area: 349.4 m^{2} (3,761 sq ft)
- Empty weight: 32,400 kg (71,430 lb)
- Gross weight: 71,350 kg (157,300 lb)
- Max takeoff weight: 75,000 kg (165,347 lb)
- Fuel capacity: 50,600 L (13,400 US gal; 11,100 imp gal)
- Oil capacity: 422 L (111 US gal; 93 imp gal) in the oil tank of each engine.
- Powerplant: 6 × Wright GR-2600-A5B Twin Cyclone 14-cylinder air-cooled radial engines, 1,194 kW (1,600 hp) each
- Propellers: 3-bladed constant-speed propellers, 4.3 m (14 ft 1 in) diameter

Performance

- Maximum speed: 395 km/h (245 mph, 213 kn) at 1,800 m (5,900 ft)
- Cruise speed: 295 km/h (183 mph, 159 kn) at 500 m (1,600 ft)
- Range: 6,035 km (3,750 mi, 3,259 nmi)
- Wing loading: 92.7 kg/m^{2} (19.0 lb/sq ft)
- Power/mass: 0.10 kW/kg (0.061 hp/lb)

== See also ==
Aircraft of comparable role, configuration, and era

- Blohm & Voss BV 222 Wiking
- Martin JRM Mars
- Saunders-Roe Princess
- Short Shetland
- Sud-Est SE.200 Amphitrite — Direct competitor

Related lists

- List of aircraft of World War II
- List of flying boats and floatplanes
