= SFAN 5 =

1930s French aircraft

General information
- Type: Training ultralight aircraft
- National origin: France
- Manufacturer: SFAN
- Number built: 1

History
- First flight: 1936

The SFAN 5 was a two-seat French motor-glider built in the late 1930s.

== Specifications ==
Data from , Jane's all the World's Aircraft 1937

General characteristics

- Crew: 2
- Length: 7.05 m (23 ft 2 in)
- Wingspan: 12.5 m (41 ft 0 in) (10.3 m (34 ft))
- Wing area: 18 m^{2} (190 sq ft) (16.2 m^{2} (174 sq ft))
- Empty weight: 285 kg (628 lb)
- Gross weight: 500 kg (1,102 lb)
- Powerplant: 1 × Train 4T 4-cylinder inverted air-cooled in-line piston engine, 45 kW (60 hp)
- Propellers: 2-bladed fixed-pitch pusher propeller

Performance

- Maximum speed: 115 km/h (71 mph, 62 kn)
- Cruise speed: 120 km/h (75 mph, 65 kn)
- Landing speed: 45 km/h (28 mph; 24 kn)
- Range: 450 km (280 mi, 240 nmi)
- Time to altitude: 1,000 m (3,300 ft) in 6 minutes
- Wing loading: 30.8 kg/m^{2} (6.3 lb/sq ft)
- Power/mass: 11.17 kg/kW (18.37 lb/hp)
