= Hennion two-seater =

Hennion

General information
- Type: Two seat sports aircraft
- National origin: France
- Designer: Emile Hennion
- Status: Destroyed
- Number built: 1

History
- First flight: 28 August 1939
- Retired: 1962

The Hennion was a two-seat French training and touring aircraft, completed just before World War II began. It was flown again post-war and later fitted with a new engine; it survived into the early 1960s.

== Design and development ==
Emile Hennion was the chief pilot at the Casablanca Aero Club in the 1930s. Just before the outbreak of World War II he designed, built and flew a side-by-side seat two seat aircraft, powered by a Train 4A 01 inverted four cylinder air-cooled engine which produced only 30 kW (40 hp). His goals were safety in the hands of a beginner, economy, comfort and true touring ability. The first two features made it of some interest as an ab initio trainer after France had gone to war.

In this pre-war form it was known as the Hennion 01. It was a low wing, cantilever monoplane, its wings straight tapered with blunt tips and of quite high aspect ratio (10). The wings were built around a single spar and fabric covered, though the ailerons were plywood skinned.

The fuselage was flat sided and ply skinned, except behind the cockpit where rounded, raised decking was fabric covered. The Hennion's cockpit was fully enclosed under a two-piece canopy with a sliding rear component. Its two seats were equipped with dual controls. Behind them there were luggage and light baggage/chart spaces, respectively 900 mm × 300 mm × 530 mm (35 in × 12 in × 21 in) and 900 mm × 200 mm × 400 mm (35 in × 8 in × 16 in). The inverted Train engine in the nose drove a two-blade propeller and its fuel tank held 85 L (18.7 imp gal; 22.5 US gal). At the rear the vertical tail was tall, with an unbalanced rudder which reached down to the keel and a fuselage-mounted tailplane ahead of it. The Hennion had a tail wheel undercarriage with a track of 2.20 m (86.6 in), its spatted main wheels on vertical, streamlined legs. The Hennion 01 flew for the first time on 28 September 1939 at Casablanca. Despite the low power, it had a maximum speed of 150 km/h (93 mph) and cruised at 125–130 km/h (78–81 mph). Cruising, it used about 10 L (2.2 imp gal; 2.6 US gal) per hour, giving it a range around 1,000 km (620 mi). Landing speed was 45 km/h (28 mph).

The Hennion 01 survived the war and was flown again in 1949, now on the French civil register as F-WFOY. After a period of disuse, it was re-engined in 1956 with a 48 kW (65 hp) Continental A65 air-cooled flat-four in a revised nose and redesignated the Hennion II. The extra power gave a useful increase in speed despite an increase in empty weight of about 17%. On 4 February 1962 it was destroyed at Meknes.

== Variants ==
Hennion 01
pre-war version with Train engine
Hennion II
1956 revision with a more powerful Continental engine

== Specifications (Hennion II) ==
Data from Gaillard (1990)

General characteristics

- Crew: Two
- Length: 7.30 m (23 ft 11 in)
- Wingspan: 12.60 m (41 ft 4 in)
- Wing area: 15.5 m^{2} (167 sq ft)
- Aspect ratio: 10
- Airfoil: NACA 23012
- Empty weight: 352 kg (776 lb)
- Gross weight: 572 kg (1,261 lb)
- Powerplant: 1 × Continental A65 air-cooled flat-four, 48 kW (65 hp)
- Propellers: 2-bladed

Performance

- Maximum speed: 170 km/h (110 mph, 92 kn)
- Cruise speed: 145 km/h (90 mph, 78 kn)
