= Train T =

French piston aircraft engine series

2T, 4T, 6T
- Type: In line air-cooled inverted piston engine
- National origin: France
- Manufacturer: Établissements E. Train

The Train 2T, 4T and 6T were low power piston engines for light aircraft, produced in France. They were inverted, air-cooled in-line engines with the same bore and stroke, differing chiefly in the number of cylinders.

== Design and development ==
In the 1930s Train introduced a series of air-cooled, inverted in-line piston engines for light aircraft. The T series all used the same cylinders, pistons, connecting rods, valve trains and ignition system, combined into 2 (2T), 4 (4T), and 6 (6T) cylinder units of the same layout. The number of crankshaft bearings (3, 5 or 7) and throws (2, 4 or 6) naturally depended on the number of cylinders, as did the number of cams (4, 8 or 12) on the underhead camshaft. Each cylinder had a swept volume of 0.5 L (30.5 cu in), so the displacements were 1 L (61.0 cu in), 2 L (122.0 cu in) and 3 L (183.1 cu in) and the rated outputs 15 kW (20.1 hp), 30 kW (40.2 hp) and 44.7 kW (60 hp) respectively. The Train 6D was a variant of the 6T with increased bore of 85 mm (3.3 in).

== Operational history ==
Several International 2-litre Class records were set in 1937 by aircraft powered by the Train 4T. On 7 June 1937 M. Duverene averaged 154.5 km/h (96.0 mph; 83.4 kn) over 1,000 km (621.4 mi; 540.0 nmi) and 95 km/h (59.0 mph; 51.3 kn) over 1,000 km (621.4 mi; 540.0 nmi) in a single engine Kellner-Béchereau E.1. On 27 December 1937 Mme Lafargue reached an altitude of 4,935 m (16,191 ft) in a Touya, setting both a class and a women's record.

It also powered aircraft on some notable cross-country flights; on 30 December 1937 M. Lenee flew a Kellner-Béchereau E.1 from Elde to Biarritz, a distance of 1,229 km (763.7 mi; 663.6 nmi); the same day M. Blazy flew a two-seat SFAN 5 aircraft from Guyancourt to Champniers, Charente, covering 330 km (205.1 mi; 178.2 nmi).

Six Train 4Ts were used in the 2 seat, 18 m (59.1 ft) span Potez-CAMS 160 flying boat, a 1:2.6 scale model of the large Potez-CAMS 161 aircraft.

== Variants ==
From Jane's All the World's Aircraft 1938 unless noted

Train 2T
2-cylinders, 80 mm (3.15 in), 1 L (61.0 cu in), 15 kW (20.1 hp)

Train 4T
4-cylinders, 80 mm (3.15 in), 2 L (122.0 cu in), 30 kW (40.2 hp)

Train 4A - 30–41 kW (40–55 hp) variant of the 4T
Train 4E - 37–41 kW (50–55 hp) variant of the 4T

Train 6T
6-cylinders, 80 mm (3.15 in), 3 L (183.1 cu in), 44.7 kW (60 hp)

Train 6C-01
Powered the Tokyo Imperial University LB-2

Train 6D
6-cylinders, 85 mm (3.35 in), 3.4 L (207.5 cu in), 62 kW (83.1 hp)

== Applications ==
From Jane's All the World's Aircraft 1938 and www.AviaFrance

=== 4-cylinder models ===
- Brochet MB.50 (4T)
- Carmier T.10 (4A)
- Caudron C.344 (4T)
- Chilton D.W.1A (4T)
- Druine Aigle 777 (4T)
- Duverne-Saran (4T)
- Hennion 01 (4A 01)
- Kellner-Béchereau E.1 (4T)
- Mauboussin Hémiptère (4T)
- Morane-Saulnier MS-660 (4E-01)
- Nicolas-Claude NC-2 Aquilon (4E-01?)
- Payen AP-10 (4T)
- Potez-CAMS 160 (4T or 4A-01)
- Régnier 12 (4T)
- Touya aircraft (4T)
- Trébucien Sport (4T)

=== 6-cylinder models ===
- Aubert PA-20 Cigale (6T)
- Duverne-Saran 01 (6T)
- Kellner-Béchereau EC.4 (6T)
- Kellner-Béchereau ED.5 (6T)
- S.E.C.A.T. S.4 Mouette
- SECAT VI La Mouette (6T)
- SFAN 5 (6T)
- Volland V-10 (6T)

== Specifications (4T) ==
Data from Jane's All the World's Aircraft 1938

=== General characteristics ===
- Type: 4-cylinder inline inverted air-cooled
- Bore: 80 mm (3.15 in)
- Stroke: 100 mm (3.94 in)
- Displacement: 2.01 L (123 in^{3}))
- Length: 670 mm (26.4 in)
- Width: 240 mm (9.45 in)
- Height: 516 mm (20.3 in)
- Dry weight: 46 kg (101 lb)

=== Components ===
- Valvetrain: Valves directly operated by cams on underhead camshaft, driven from crankshaft via bevel gears. One inlet and one exhaust valve/cylinder.
- Fuel system: single carburetter
- Ignition system: Choice of one or two magnetos with one or two plugs/cylinder
- Oil system: Pumped under pressure from external tank, feeding main bearings and big ends; little ends and piston walls spray fed. Gravity return. Underhead valve gear in full length oil bath.
- Cooling system: air
- Reduction gear: None
- Cylinders: Machined steel barrels with aluminium-bronze heads containing machined valve seat and secured with long bolts to crankcase.

Pistons
Aluminium alloy. Floating gudgeon pins. Three compression and one scraper ring/cylinder
Connecting rods
Forged duralumin with split big ends.
Crankshaft
4-throw steel casting with 5 white metal lined bearings. Front ball race thrust bearing.
Crankcase
Aluminium casting in top and bottom halves, with capped crankshaft bearings in the lower part.

=== Performance ===
- Power output: Rated 30 kW (40 hp), actual 33 kW (44 hp), both at 2,300 rpm
- Specific power: 16.5 kW/L (0.64 hp/in^{3})
- Compression ratio: 6:1
- Specific fuel consumption: 322 g/(kW·h) (0.529 lb/(hp·h))
- Oil consumption: 61 g/(kW·h) (0.10 lb/(hp·h))
- Power-to-weight ratio: 0.72 kW/kg (0.44 hp/lb)

== See also ==
Related lists

- List of aircraft engines
