= Air France Flight 072 (1948) =

1948 disappearance of aeroplane over Atlantic

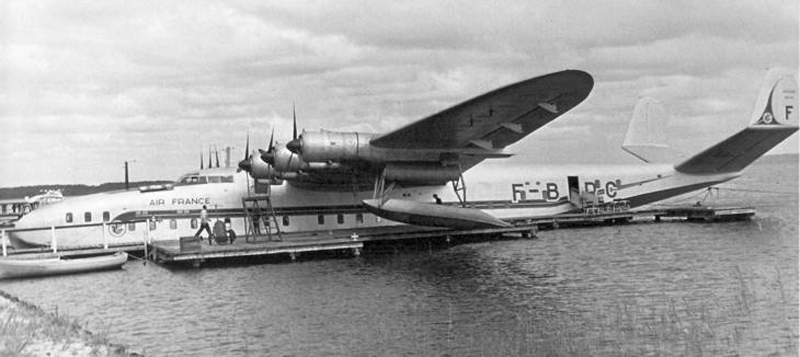
- F-BDRC, the Latécoère 631 involved in the accident

Accident
- Date: 1 August 1948
- Summary: Ditching, cause unknown, possible fire on board
- Site: Atlantic Ocean

Aircraft
- Aircraft type: Latécoère 631
- Aircraft name: Lionel de Marnier
- Operator: Air France
- Registration: F-BDRC
- Flight origin: Fort de France, Martinique
- Destination: Port-Etienne, French West Africa
- Occupants: 52
- Passengers: 40
- Crew: 12
- Fatalities: 52
- Survivors: 0

On 1 August 1948, Air France Flight 072 went missing over the Atlantic Ocean, presumably killing all 52 people on board. The accident led to the withdrawal of the Latécoère 631 from service by Air France. It was the deadliest aircraft accident in the Atlantic Ocean at the time and also the deadliest suffered by that type of aircraft.

== Aircraft ==
The accident aircraft was Latécoère 631 F-BDRC, Lionel de Marnier, msn 06. with a first flight on 9 November 1947.

== Accident ==
The aircraft departed from Fort de France, Martinique at 14:50 GMT on 31 July, and was due to arrive at Port-Etienne, French West Africa at 01:00 GMT on 1 August. It was carrying a crew of twelve and 40 passengers. It was reported that a mayday distress signal had been received by an American radio station in the Azores just after midnight on 1 August. The aircraft's position was estimated as 1,100 nautical miles (1,300 mi; 2,000 km) north of the Cape Verde Islands. Two Air France aircraft, a French Air Force aircraft and a French Navy ship were sent to search for the aircraft. The United States Coast Guard sent USCGC Campbell to assist in the search. The Portuguese authorities allowed aircraft searching for the missing Latécoère 631 to use the Ilha do Sal Airport, which was not then open to traffic. Two Portuguese Air Force Boeing B-17 Flying Fortresses also joined the search. The United States Air Force sent a Flying Fortress and seven Boeing B-29 Superfortresses to join the search.

On 3 August, the French weather ship Leverrier reported receiving a distress message from the aircraft. A second message was received early the next morning. The American Flying Fortress also reported receiving a "faint and garbled" distress message that day. USCGC Campbell reported finding two seats from the aircraft at a position 1,570 nautical miles (1,810 mi; 2,910 km) east of Puerto Rico. An aircraft later reported seeing wreckage 15 nautical miles (17 mi; 28 km) from the position the seats were found. Some of the wreckage showed evidence of fire. The search for survivors was called off on 9 August. Following the accident, which was the worst crash in the Atlantic Ocean at the time and also the worst ever suffered by the Latécoère 631, the type was withdrawn from service by Air France.
