= Potez-CAMS 161 =

1940s French flying boat airliner

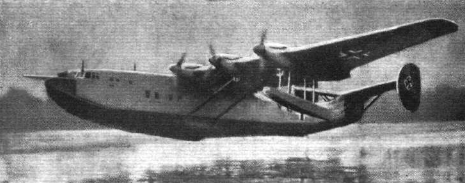

General information
- Type: Flying boat airliner
- National origin: France
- Manufacturer: CAMS
- Number built: 1

The Potez-CAMS 161 was a large, French six-engined flying boat airliner, designed to operate on the North Atlantic routes that were opening up in the late 1930s. Its development was almost halted by World War II. Just one was built and partially tested before its destruction by Allied forces near the war's end.

== Design and development ==
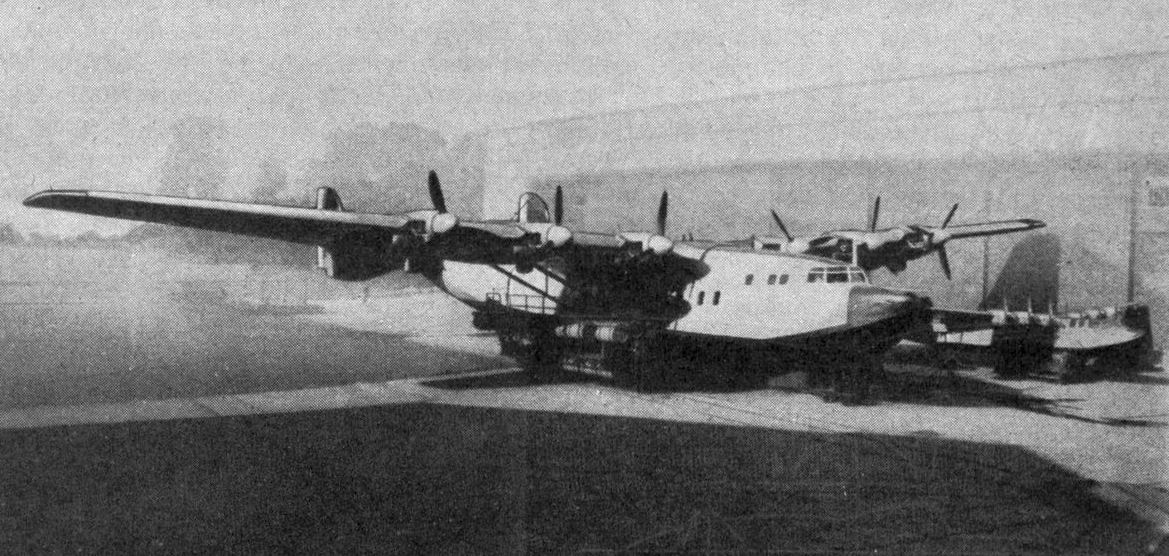
Potez-CAMS 161 in foreground with the type 160 scale flight model behind. Floats retracted.

The Potez-CAMS 161 was one of three French large, six-engined flying boats intended as airliners on the North Atlantic route. The others were the Latécoère 631 and the SNCASE SE.200. In the summer of 1938, the 161's aerodynamics had been investigated and refined with the Potez-CAMS 160, a 5/13 scale flight model. Very different dates for the first flight appear in the literature: a contemporary report in Flight gives it as within few weeks before 7 December 1939, with "further flying tests" in the first half of 1942, whereas Hartmann has 20 March 1942 as the first flight date. In either case the CAMS machine was the first of the three to fly.

The 161 was an all-metal monoplane with a high, semi-cantilever wing, braced on each side by a pair of parallel struts between the lower fuselage and the wing near the first outboard engine. The engines were mounted on a constant chord central section but the outer panels were tapered, with ailerons interconnected to Handley Page slots near the wing tips. The trailing edges carried split flaps. The flying boat's wing stabilizing floats retracted vertically to the outer engine cowlings. The tail unit was of the twin endplate fin type with the tailplane, mounted with marked dihedral, on a fuselage pedestal and externally braced from below. The D-shaped fins were fixed to the tailplane a little below their horizontal mid-lines and were also lightly braced, with struts between them and the upper tailplane surfaces.

The CAMS 161 was powered by six 664 kW (890 hp) Hispano-Suiza 12Ydrs liquid cooled V-12 engines driving three blade propellers. These were cooled via both wing surface and frontal radiators, the latter retracted after take-off. Its two step hull was flat sided forward of the wing but more rounded aft; there were long wing root fillets. Ten square windows on each side lit the passenger cabin, where twenty were provided with seating and sleeping compartments and flown and looked after by six crew.

Full flight trials and performance measurements were never done, so the figures remain estimates, but there is clear evidence that the empty weight had increased by about 33% from the 1938 estimates by the time the 161 was flying, with a corresponding 16% increase in gross weight.

== Operational history ==
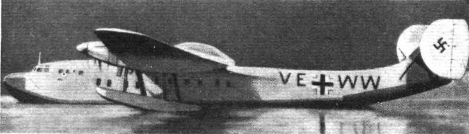

In Hartmann's account, the March flight was from the Seine, with the aircraft in German markings. Earlier it had been painted in Air France Atlantique trim and at some point it received a French civil registration. It seems to have been destroyed by enemy fire toward the end of World War II, but there is disagreement on exactly when and where: Hartmann locates the event to the Baltic, others to Lake Constance. Cuny states that the SE.200 and the Laté 631 were destroyed on the lake early in 1944, but that the Potez escaped. Ultimately, the Potez 161 appears to have been destroyed on Lake Constance between September and October 1944 by USAAF fighters. Gun camera footage from this period clearly shows the aircraft, identifiable by its distinctive D-shaped tails, under fire and partially submerged.

== Specifications ==
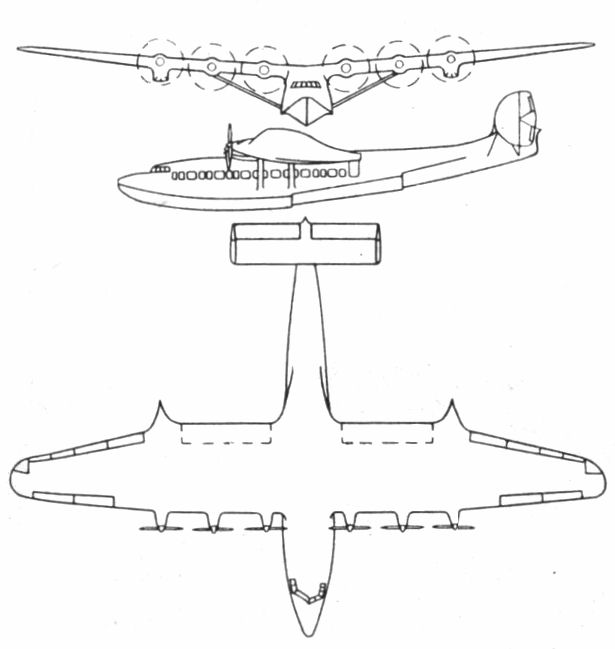
Potez-CAMS 161 3-view drawing from L'Aerophile December 1941

Data from Jane's All the World's Aircraft 1938 (Note: All Jane's figures pre-date completion so should be treated cautiously.)

General characteristics

- Crew: Six
- Capacity: Twenty passengers
- Length: 32.11 m (105 ft 4 in)
- Wingspan: 46 m (150 ft 11 in)
- Height: 8.87 m (29 ft 1 in)
- Wing area: 261 m^{2} (2,810 sq ft)
- Empty weight: 17,220 kg (37,964 lb) ; Flight (1942) has 22,979 kg (50,660 lb)
- Gross weight: 37,000 kg (81,571 lb) ; Flight (1942) has 43,001 kg (94,800 lb)
- Fuel capacity: 15,500 kg (34,172 lb) including oil
- Powerplant: 6 × Hispano-Suiza 12Ydrs liquid cooled V-12, 660 kW (890 hp) each
- Propellers: 3-bladed

Performance

- Maximum speed: 335 km/h (208 mph, 181 kn) at 1,000 m (3,300 ft)
- Cruise speed: 300 km/h (190 mph, 160 kn) at 4,000 m (13,000 ft)
- Range: 6,000 km (3,700 mi, 3,200 nmi) in a 60 km/h (37 mph) wind, with full payload and standard fuel capacity

== Bibliography ==
- Bousquet, Gérard (March 1989). "Le Potez-CAMS 161" [The Potez-CAMS 161]. Le Fana de l'Aviation (in French) (232): 33–37. ISSN 0757-4169.
- Bousquet, Gérard (April 1989). "Le Potez-CAMS 160 et 161" [The Potez-CAMS 161 and 161]. Le Fana de l'Aviation (in French) (233): 32–37. ISSN 0757-4169.
- Bousquet, Gérard (May 1989). "Le Potez-CAMS 161: Foudroyé en mer Baltique (3 et fin)" [The Potez-CAMS 161: Shot Down over the Baltic Sea (Part 3)]. Le Fana de l'Aviation (in French) (234): 22–27. ISSN 0757-4169.
