= Volland V-10 =

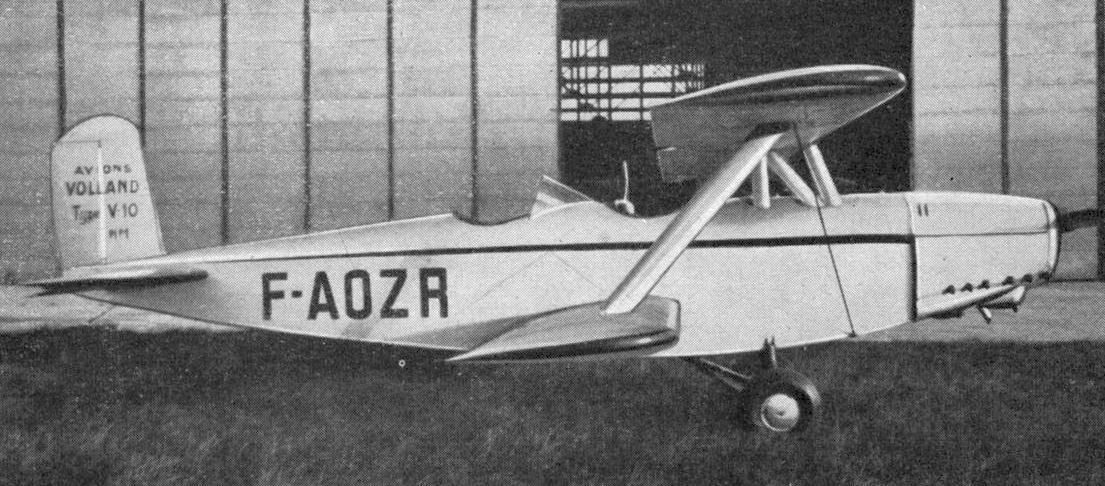

General information
- Type: Touring and trainer aircraft
- National origin: France
- Manufacturer: Avions Volland
- Number built: 1

History
- First flight: 26 May 1936

The Volland V-10 was a French two seat, low-powered biplane notable for its extreme stagger. It first flew in 1936 and appeared at the Paris Aero Salon that year.

== Design ==
The V-10 was a single bay biplane with wings of almost equal span but extreme stagger, so that the upper trailing edge was almost exactly above the lower leading edge in level light. This arrangement owed something to the Darmstadt D-18 (1929) and D-22 biplanes, though the Volland's wings were conventionally braced and not cantilevers; its single, streamlined interplane struts leant forward at about 50° to the horizontal. The upper wing had a slightly greater span than the lower but the same chord. It was braced over the fuselage with a triangular cabane. Both wings were essentially rectangular in plan, with blunted tips. They had wooden structures, each with two spars, and were fabric covered apart from the demountable wingtips which were covered in light metal. Ailerons were confined to the lower wing but filled its entire trailing edge.

Its rectangular cross-section fuselage was built around four ash longerons joined by spruce frames and plywood covered. It had a 45 kW (60 hp) six-cylinder, inverted, air-cooled inline Train 6T engine in the nose and there was a large baggage store behind it. There were two open cockpits in tandem, fitted with dual control. The forward one, for a pupil or passenger, was under the trailing edge of the upper wing, which had a central rectangular cut-out to improve access. The rear cockpit was for the pilot or instructor and was fully instrumented.

The V-10 had a conventional empennage, with a slightly tapered tailplane mounted at mid-fuselage height and fitted with inset elevators. Its tall, nearly vertical, blunt-topped fin carried a rectangular inset rudder. These rear surfaces had wooden structures and were plywood covered.

It had a simple, fixed tailskid undercarriage. Its mainwheels had a track of 1.4 m (4 ft 7 in) and were on half axles from the lower longerons. On each side an oleo strut ran rearwards from the wheels to the centre of the fuselage underside.

== Development ==
Tests of the Volland V-10, temporarily equipped with a 45 kW (60 hp) Régnier two-cylinder R.2 engine, began in April 1936 and the first flight took place on 26 May. Soon afterwards it was equipped with the Train 6T that it was designed for; tests with this engine began in August, lasting until the end of the month. It returned for what were hoped to be its final tests on 9 October 1936 at Villacoublay but official certification was not achieved until March 1937.

== Operational history ==
The Volland competed in the Charles-Delesalle Cup on 15 August 1936 but had to abort take-off and retire.

It was displayed at the 15th Paris Aero Salon in November 1936.

== Specifications (Train 6T engine) ==
Data from Les Ailes March 1937

General characteristics

- Crew: One pilot
- Capacity: One crew
- Length: 6 m (19 ft 8 in)
- Wingspan: 7 m (23 ft 0 in)
- Height: 2 m (6 ft 7 in)
- Wing area: 12 m^{2} (130 sq ft)
- Empty weight: 310 kg (683 lb)
- Gross weight: 550 kg (1,213 lb)
- Fuel capacity: 70 L (15 imp gal; 18 US gal) in fuselage tank
- Powerplant: 1 × Train 6T air-cooled inverted 6-cylinder inline, 45 kW (60 hp)
- Propellers: 2-bladed

Performance

- Maximum speed: 170 km/h (110 mph, 92 kn)
- Cruise speed: 140 km/h (87 mph, 76 kn)
- Range: 1,000 km (620 mi, 540 nmi)
- Service ceiling: 4,000 m (13,000 ft)
- Time to altitude: 2 min 50 sec to 360 m (1,180 ft)
- Landing speed: 60 km/h (37 mph)
