= Flight Risk =

Flight Risk or flight risk may refer to:

- A "flight risk", a person in law enforcement custody who is considered likely to abscond; see:
  - Bail in the United States
  - Failure to appear
- Risks associated with flights or aviation

== Music and literature ==
- Flight Risk (album), 2011 album by The Jacka
- Flight Risk, 2011 mixtape by SL Jones
- Flight Risk: Memoirs of a New Orleans Bad Boy, 2017 book by James Nolan
- Flight Risk, 2017 novel by Jennifer Fenn

== Film and television ==
- "Flight Risk" (CSI: Miami), a 2009 television episode
- "Flight Risk" (Law & Order: Special Victims Unit), a 2018 television episode
- "Flight Risk" (Elementary), a 2012 television episode
- "Flight Risk" (Lethal Weapon), a 2017 television episode
- Flight/Risk, a 2022 documentary film about the crashes of two Boeing 737 MAX planes
- Flight Risk (film), a 2025 suspense thriller film starring Mark Wahlberg
