= Zotye V10 =

Chinese microvan

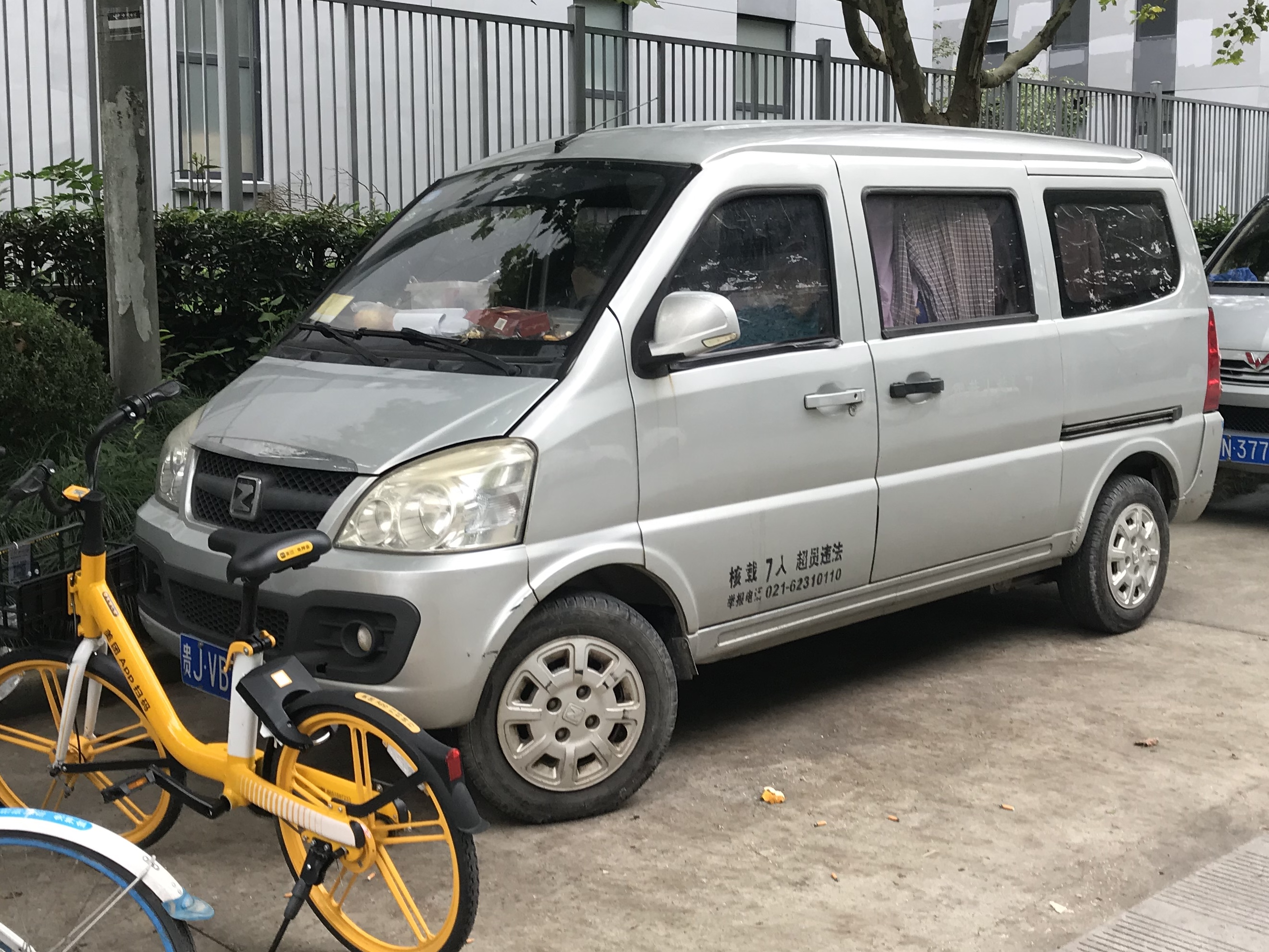

Overview
- Manufacturer: Zotye
- Also called: Zotye Jietai (electric version)
- Production: 2011–2021

Body and chassis
- Class: Microvan
- Body style: 5-door, 5- to 8-seater Microvan

Powertrain
- Engine: 1.2 L I4
- Transmission: 5 speed manual

Dimensions
- Wheelbase: 2,700 mm (106.3 in)
- Length: 3,995 mm (157.3 in)
- Width: 1,620 mm (63.8 in)
- Height: 1,915 mm (75.4 in)

The Zotye V10 is a five-door, five- to eight-seater Microvan made by Zotye, a Chinese car manufacturer.

== Overview ==
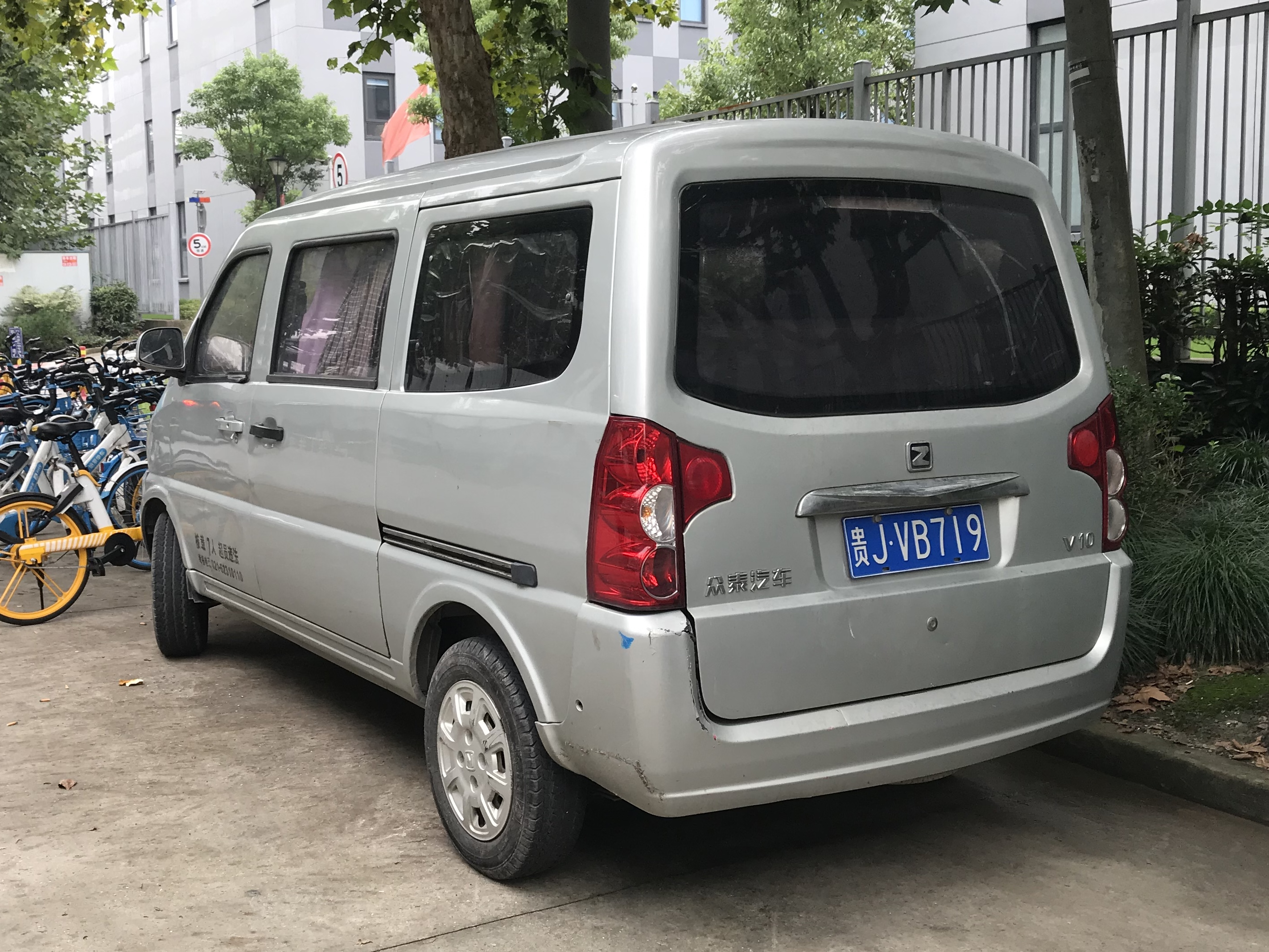
Zotye V10 rear

The Zotye V10 is Zotye's first entry into the microvan market with prices starting from 39,800 yuan and ending at 50,800 yuan.. The Zotye V10 has only one engine option which is a 1.2 liter inline-four engine producing 85 hp and 105nm mated to a 5-speed manual gearbox.

== Zotye Jietai ==
The Zotye Jietai (捷泰) was launched in October 2015. The Jietai is the electric version of the V10 microvan, developed for the logistics industry. The Jietai utilizes the exact same body and dimensions of the Zotye V10 while replacing the power house with a 29 kW battery weighing 310 kg, resulting in the full vehicle weight reaching 1400kg. According to Zotye officials, the maximum range is 210 km and the top speed is 105 km/h.
