= Louis Béchereau =

French aviation pioneer

Louis Béchereau (July 25, 1880 in Plou, Cher – March 18, 1970 in Paris) was a French aeronautical engineer and pioneer of French aviation.

== Biography ==
After having attended the École nationale professionnelle in Vierzon, Béchereau went to the Arts et Métiers in Angers in 1896, and finished his studies in 1901. Before joining the army he took part in a model-making competition organized by L'Auto, taking first prize for a model subsequently manufactured for sale in Parisian department stores.

Demobilised in 1902, Béchereau joined a mechanical construction factory in Bezons where he took part in the development of a prototype car designed by Clément Ader. He took a number of trial flights with the Ader Éole or Avion.

In 1903 a nephew of Clément Ader in Levallois created the Société de Construction d'Appareils Aériens. In 1909 a client of the firm, Armand Deperdussin, had ordered the construction of an aeroplane that was exhibited in the windows of the Bon Marché store in Paris. In 1910 Deperdussin founded the Société de Production des Aéroplanes Deperdussin (SPAD) and appointed Béchereau as chief engineer.

From the beginning, Béchereau conceived the idea of monocoque fuselages, which would allow hitherto unthinkable levels of performance. His direct collaborators, Louis Janoir, chief pilot, and André Herbemont, were also graduates of the Arts et Métiers. Béchereau's revolutionary concept allowed the Deperdussin firm to win many prizes, including the famous Gordon Bennett Trophy in 1912 with Jules Védrines at the controls (first flight to achieve 100 mph), and again in 1913 with Maurice Prevost at the controls.

In 1911, one of his collaborators was Dutch aviation pioneer Frederick Koolhoven.

Following a financial scandal involving the company's founder, Louis Blériot took over the company in 1914 and renamed it Société Pour l'Aviation et ses Dérivés, keeping the initials SPAD. Béchereau remained chief designer and developed numerous models, including the SPAD S.XIII.

During the First World War, when Georges Guynemer received his first SPAD S.VII equipped with a Hispano-Suiza engine on 27 August 1916, he wrote to Louis Béchereau the next day praising the wonders of this new aeroplane. The air combat ace Guynemer thereafter had a long technical correspondence with Béchereau who he called the "ace of constructors" ("l’as des constructeurs"). It was Guynemer who later presented Béchereau with the medal of the Chevalier of the Légion d'honneur on 12 July 1917 in the SPAD works, in the presence of the Minister of War. (Citation: "Vous avez donné la suprématie aérienne à votre pays, et vous aurez une grande part dans la victoire. C'est un splendide titre de gloire. C'est avec le sentiment de l'admiration et de la grande reconnaissance que nous vous devons tous, que je vous donne l'accolade.")

Béchereau left SPAD to create the Société des Avions Bernard (also known as Société des trois B) with Bernard and Marc Birkigt. He also collaborated with the Salmson motor company and, in 1931, joined the carriage-builder Georges Kellner to create the Kellner-Béchereau company. On the eve of the Second World War, he conceived a monoplane, the K.B.E 60, for the French Navy; its development was frustrated by events.

The factory was destroyed by bombing in 1942 and the Kellner-Béchereau company was then merged into Morane-Saulnier. Béchereau remained a director until his retirement in 1950.

== Decorations ==
- In 1947, Béchereau was promoted to Officier of the Légion d'honneur.
- Médaille d'Or of the Aéro-Club de France.
- He was elected a membre d'Honneur of the Union syndicales des industries aéronautiques
- Decorated with the Médaille de l'Aéronautique in 1950.
- 1959 : laureate of the Académie des sciences and the Prix Arthur du Faÿ.
- 1967 : laureate of the Nessim Habif Prize and elevation to the rank of Commandeur of the Légion d'Honneur.

== Sources ==
Article by Frédéric Champlon in Arts et Métiers magazine, April 2003 (see external links).
