= List of gliders (K) =

This is a list of gliders/sailplanes of the world, (this reference lists all gliders with references, where available) Note: Any aircraft can glide for a short time, but gliders are designed to glide for longer.

== K ==
=== KAI ===
(Kazan Aviation Institute – Казанский авиационный институт)

- KAI-04 – G.H. Vorobyov
- KAI-6
- KAI-7
- KAI-8
- KAI-9
- KAI-11
- KAI-12 Primorets (LF107 Lunak)
- KAI-14
- KAI-17 - M.P. Simonov team leader
- KAI-18
- KAI-19
- KAI-50
- KAI-502

=== Kaiser ===
(Rudolf Kaiser)

- Kaiser Ka-1 Rhönlaus
- Schleicher Ka-2 Rhönschwalbe
- Schleicher Ka-3
- Schleicher Ka-4 Rhönlerche II
- Kaiser Ka-5
- Schleicher Ka-6 Rhönsegler
- Schleicher Ka-6E
- Schleicher Ka-7 Rhönadler
- Schleicher Ka-8
- Kaiser Ka-9
- Schleicher Ka-10
- Kaiser K-11

=== Kalinin OKB ===
- Kalinin K-11 – proof of concept glider for K-12 / BS-2 / K-13 tailless airliner / bomber

=== Kantor-Kurklik ===
(František Kantor & Karel Kurklik)

- Racek 3 Möwe
- Racek-3 Mrkev

=== Karpinski ===
- Karpiński 1929 glider
- Karpiński SL-1 Akar

=== Karski ===
(Julian Karski)

- Karski 1910 glider
- Karski 1912 glider

=== Karvelis ===
(Balys Karvelis)

- Karvelis BK-1 Vanagas – Falcon
- Karvelis BK-2
- Karvelis BK-3
- Karvelis BK-4 Kaunas
- Karvelis BK-5
- Karvelis BK-6 Neringa
- Karvelis BK-7 Lietuva
- Karvelis BK-7A

=== Kasper ===
(Witold Kasper)

- Kasper BKB
- Kasper Bekas 1-A
- Kasper Bekas N

=== Kasprzyk ===
- Kasprzyk Salamandra

=== Kassel ===
(Segelflugzeugbau Kassel)

- Kassel 12 – Fieseler Flugzeugbau, Kassel
- Kassel 20 – Fieseler Flugzeugbau, Kassel
- Kassel 25 – Fieseler Flugzeugbau, Kassel
- Kassel 26 – Fieseler Flugzeugbau, Kassel
- Kassel 28 – Fieseler Flugzeugbau, Kassel
- Kassel Herkules – Fieseler Flugzeugbau, Kassel
- Kassel 1926 glider – Fritz Paul

=== Kayaba ===
- Kayaba Ku-1
- Kayaba Ku-2 (萱场 2 型无尾翼滑翔机)
- Kayaba Ku-3
- Kayaba Ku-4
- Kayaba Model 1b

=== Kegel ===
(Kegel-Flugzeugbau Kassel / Max Kegel and Fritz Ackermann using logo AK / renamed Segelflugzeugbau Kassel using logo SK)

- Kegel I (Max kegel and Fritz Paul)
- Kegel I Blaue motorglider
- Kegel III
- Kegel Zögling - copies or licence-built?

=== Keihikoki ===
- Keihikoki SS-2 – (軽飛行機式 SS-2型上級単座滑空機)

=== Kelsey ===
(Frank Kelsey)

- Kelsey K-16
- Kelsey Klippety Klop

=== Kemeny ===
(Sándor Kemeny / MÁV Istvántelki Fõmûhely, Sportárutermelõ V. (former Aero Ever Ltd.), Esztergom)

- Kemény K-01
- Kemény K-02 Szellõ

=== Kendall ===
(Hugh Kendall)

- Kendall K-1
- Kendall Crabpot

=== Kenilworth ===
- Kenilworth Me7

=== Kennedy-Watson ===
(Harold Kennedy and Floyd Watson)

- Kennedy K-W

=== Kensgailos ===
(Vlado Kensgailos)

- Kensgailos Žuvėdra

=== Kesselyàk ===
(Mihály Kesselyak / Workshop of the Airplane Service of the Hungarian Agricultural Ministry, Nyiregyháza)

- Kesselyàk KM-400

=== KhAI ===
(Kharkov Aviation Institute)

- KhAI-3 Харьков ХАИ-3

=== Keith-Weiss ===
(Alexander Keith & José Weiss)

- Keith-Weiss Aviette

=== Kimura ===
(Dr. Hidemasa Kimura)

- Kimura HK-1

=== Király-Berkovice ===
- Király-Berkovice I

=== Kirchner ===
(Wilhelm Kirchner at Kassel / Niederhessischer Verein für Luftfahrt)

- Kirchner La Pruvo
- Kirchner Futurum
- Kirchner Hessenland

=== Kirigamine ===
(Kirigamine Glider Manufacturing Co.)

- Kirigamine K14
- Kirigamine Mita 3

=== Kissinger-Crookes ===
( Curtiss Kissinger, LeRoy Crookes)

- Kissinger-Crookes Flying Saucer

=== Kittelberger ===
(Walter & Karl Kittelberger)

- Kittelberger WKM-1
- Kittelberger WKS-2
- Kittelberger WKS-3
- Kittelberger WKS-4

=== Klementyev ===
(P. Klementyev)

- Klementyev APS-11

=== Klobučar ===
(Viktor Klobučar)

- Klobučar 1911 glider

=== Klotz ===
- Klotz Moka-1 motor-glider (D-KLBY)

=== K.L.S. ===
('Start' Aviation Circle)

- K.L.S.2 –
- K.L.S.3 – 'Start' Aviation Circle

=== Knechtel ===
(Ing. Wilhelm Knechtel)

- Knechtel Rhönlerche IIM
- Knechtel KN-1
- Knechtel KN-2

=== Kocjan ===
(Antoni Kocjan)

- Kocjan Orlik
- Kocjan Orlik 2 (USAAC – XTG-7)
- Kocjan Orlik 3 Olympic Orlik
- Kocjan Bąk (horse-fly)
- Kocjan Bąk II
- Kocjan Bąk II bis
- Kocjan Czajka I (Lapwing)
- Kocjan Czajka II
- Kocjan Czajka III
- Kocjan Czajka bis
- Kocjan Komar (Gnat)
- Kocjan Sokół
- Kocjan Wrona (Crow)
- Kocjan Wrona bis
- Kocjan Sroka (Magpie)
- Kocjan-Grzeszczyk Mewa
- Kocjan TG-7 (Orlik 2)

=== Kodytek ===
(Josef Kodytek)

- Kodytek 1925 glider

=== Köhl ===
(Hermann Köhl / Koehl)

- Köhl Ko-1 Nurflügler a.k.a. Koehl Ko-1

=== Kohler ===
(Spud Kohler)

- Kohler Alpha

=== Kokusai ===
(Kokusai Koku Aircraft Company)

- Kokusai Ku-7 Manazuru a.k.a. Nihon Kogata Ku-7 Manazura
- Kokusai Ku-8 a.k.a. Nihon Kogata Ku-8

=== Kolbányi ===
- Kolbányi V

=== Kolesnikov ===
(D.N. Kolesnikov)

- Kolesnikov DK-2 – Колесников ДК-2
- Kolesnikov DK-3
- Kolesnikov MKB-2
- Kolesnikov MKB-4
- Kolesnikov-Tsybin KTs-20

=== Komadori ===
- Komadori Primary

=== Königsberg Lüwa III ===
(Ostpreußischer Verein für Luftfahrt, Königsberg)

- Königsberg Lüwa III – Ostpreußischer Verein für Luftfahrt, Königsberg

=== Korolev ===
(Sergei P. Korolev)

- Korolev SC-3 Red Star – Королев СК-3 Красная звезда
- Korolev SK-9 – Королева СК-9
- Korolev RP-318-1

=== Konrad ===
(F. Konrad / Konrad Segelflugzeugbau)

- Konrad Ko Ro-4

=== Kopp ===
- Kopp Ko III

=== Kortenbach & Rauh ===
(designed by Schultes, Seidel and Putz)

- Kortenbach & Rauh Kora 1

=== Gilbert Kosellek ===
(Gilbert Kosellek)

- Kosellek G-1 Quo Vadis

=== Koser ===
(KB – Koser-Branko)

- Koser-Hrovat KB-1 Triglav Jaroslav Koser & Stojan Hrovat – a.k.a. K2A Triglav
- Koser KB-2 Udarnik – Cener-Slanovec
- Koser KB-3 Jadran – Jaroslav Koser – Branko Ivanus Institute, Celovška cesta, Ljubljana
- Koser KB-5 Triglav II – Jaroslav Koser
- Koser KB-5 Triglav III – Jaroslav Koser
- Koser KB-9 Udarnik – Cener-Slanovec

=== Kostenko-Rauschenbusch ===
(Костенко-Раушенбах ЛАК-1/2)

- Kostenko-Rauschenbusch LAK-1
- Kostenko-Rauschenbusch LAK-2

=== Kourouvakalis-Pikros ===
(Platon Kourouvakalis & Costas Pikros)

- Kourouvakalis-Pikros Anemopsaro

=== Koutný ===
(Ladislav Koutný)

- Koutný Konice 1
- Koutný Konice 4
- Koutný EL-KA-II

=== Kouzakov ===
(M.A. Kouzakov)

- Kouzakov MAK-08 – Кузакова МАК -8
- Kouzakov MAK-12
- Kouzakov MAK-15
- Kouzakov MAK-15M
- Kouzakov MAK-15MP

=== Kovalenko ===
- Kovalenko DR-5

=== Koželuh ===
(Štkpt. Koželuh / Dílny 3, leteckého pluku v Nitrě)

- Koželuh Nitra 1
- Koželuh Nitra 3

=== Kráľovič ===
(Anton Kráľovič)

- Královič K-7 Úderník

=== Krekel ===
(Paul Krekel- Hans H. Hünebeck, Metall- und Rohrbau, Duisburg)

- Krekel Grille

=== Kristovskogo ===
(E. Kristovskogo)

- Spartakus 1

=== Kromer ===
(H. Kromer / Deutscher Fliegerbund, Mähr.-Schönberg)

- Kromer Mähr-Schönberg S. E. II

=== Kronfeld ===
(Robert Kronfeld)

- Kronfeld Vienna
- Kronfeld Austria

=== Krutchkoff ===
- Krutchkoff SHP-1 – HP-14 modification

=== Kryšpín ===
(Jan Kryšpín / Továrně Avia)

- Kryšpín JK-1 Perun

=== Krząkała ===
(Wiktor Krząkała)

- Krząkała 1928 glider

=== Ksoll ===
(J. Ksoll)

- Ksoll Breslau
- Ksoll Galgenvogel I
- Ksoll Galgenvogel III

=== Kubicki ===
(Jan Kubicki)

- Kubicki Ikub I

=== Kućfir ===
(Konrad Kućfir)

- Kućfir Pirat (Pirate) – First Polish Glider Contest August 1923

=== Kuffner ===
(Werner Kuffner / WK-Flugzeugtechnik, Peenemünde, DE)

- Kuffner WK-1

=== Kuhelj ===
(Anton Kuhelj)

- Kuhelj Inka I
- Kuhelj Inka Ia
- Kuhelj Inka II

=== Küpper ===
(August Küpper)

- Küpper Kü 2 Uhu
- Küpper Kü 4 Austria Elefant
- Küpper Kü 4 Mini Austria
- Küpper Kü 7
- Küpper Kr 1 Austria 2
- Küpper Kr 1a Austria 3

=== Kusbach-Bartoník-Kotolánem ===
(Kusbach Bartoník & Kotolánem)

- KKB-15

=== Kuzmickas ===
(Antanas Kuzmickas)

- Kuzmickas KPI-3 Amber
- Kuzmickas KPI-3 Gintaras
- Kuzmickas KPI-4
- Kuzmickas KPI-5 Genys
- Kuzmickas M-1
- Kuzmickas M-2

=== Kyushu ===
(Hiroshi Sato, Osamu Hiroshi & Naka Maruta / Kyushu University)

- Kyushu 11
