= M77 =

M77 or M-77 may refer to:

- M-77 (Michigan highway), a state highway in Michigan
- M77 motorway, a motorway in Scotland
- M-77 pistol, a semi-automatic pistol
- Miles M.77 Sparrowjet, a 1950 twin-engined jet-powered racing aeroplane
- Zastava M77, a Serbian assault rifle
- Ruger M77, a bolt-action rifle
- Messier 77, a spiral galaxy in the constellation Cetus
- M-77 Oganj, a Serbian multiple rocket launcher
- Dual-Purpose Improved Conventional Munition, M77 DPICM submunition
