= Miles Sparrowhawk =

M.5 Sparrowhawk
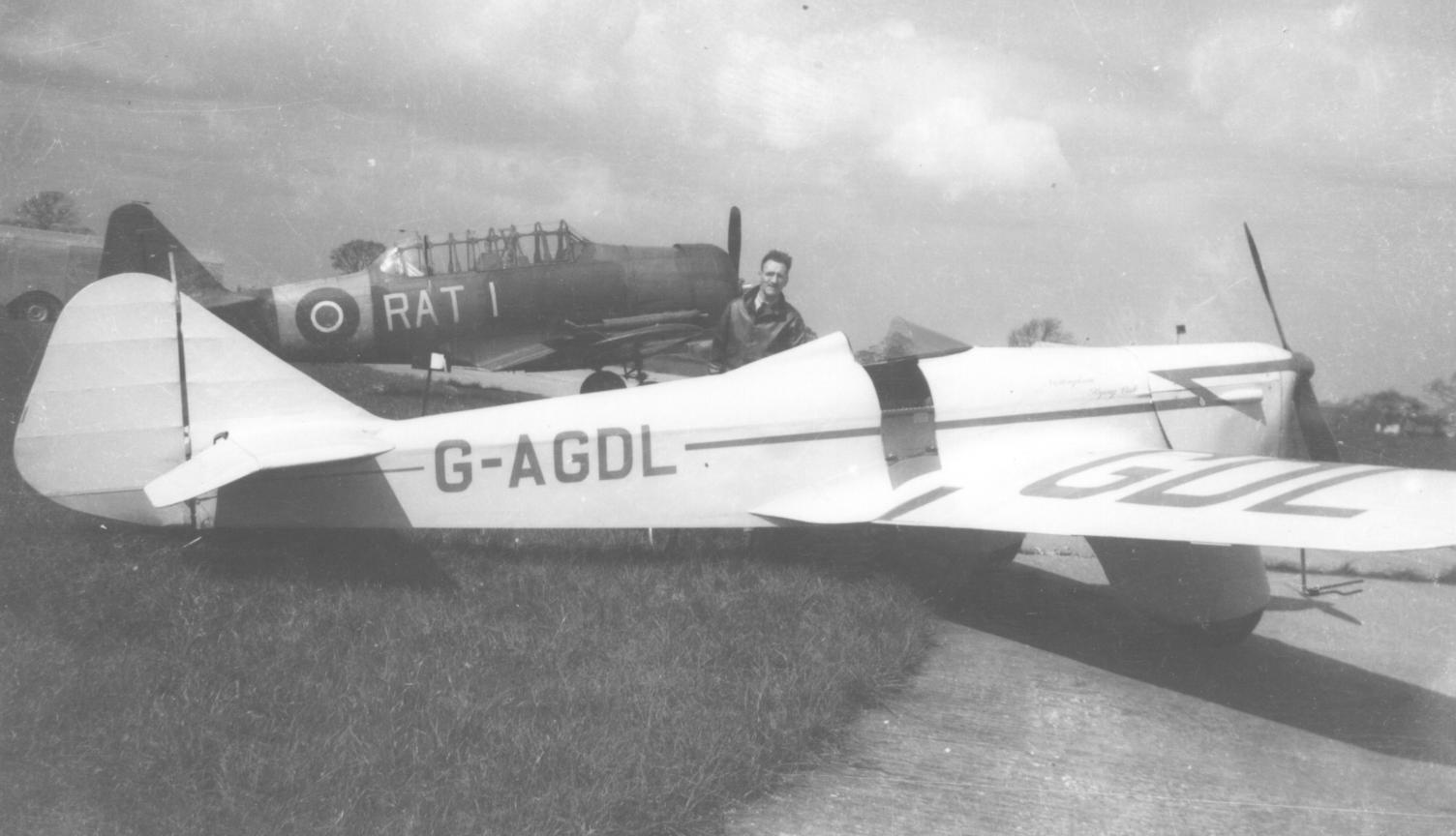

General information
- Type: Single-seat racing monoplane
- Manufacturer: Miles Aircraft Limited
- Designer: Maxine Blossom Miles
- Number built: 6

History
- Manufactured: 1935–1936
- First flight: 19 August 1935
- Developed from: Miles Hawk Major
- Variant: Miles Sparrowjet

The Miles M.5 Sparrowhawk was a 1930s British single-seat racing and touring monoplane designed by Miles Aircraft Limited.

== Design and development ==
The prototype M.5 Sparrowhawk was developed from standard Miles Hawk components as an entry into the King's Cup Race of 1935 piloted by F.G. Miles. The standard Hawk fuselage was shortened and accommodation was for only one pilot, sitting as low as possible. The top decking was reduced in height, a special high-compression version of the de Havilland Gipsy Six engine was fitted, and the undercarriage track was widened. Although the Sparrowhawk won the 1935 speed prize at an average of 163.64 miles per hour (263.35 km/h) over 953 miles (1,534 km), because of heavy handicapping, it only came ninth overall in the race.

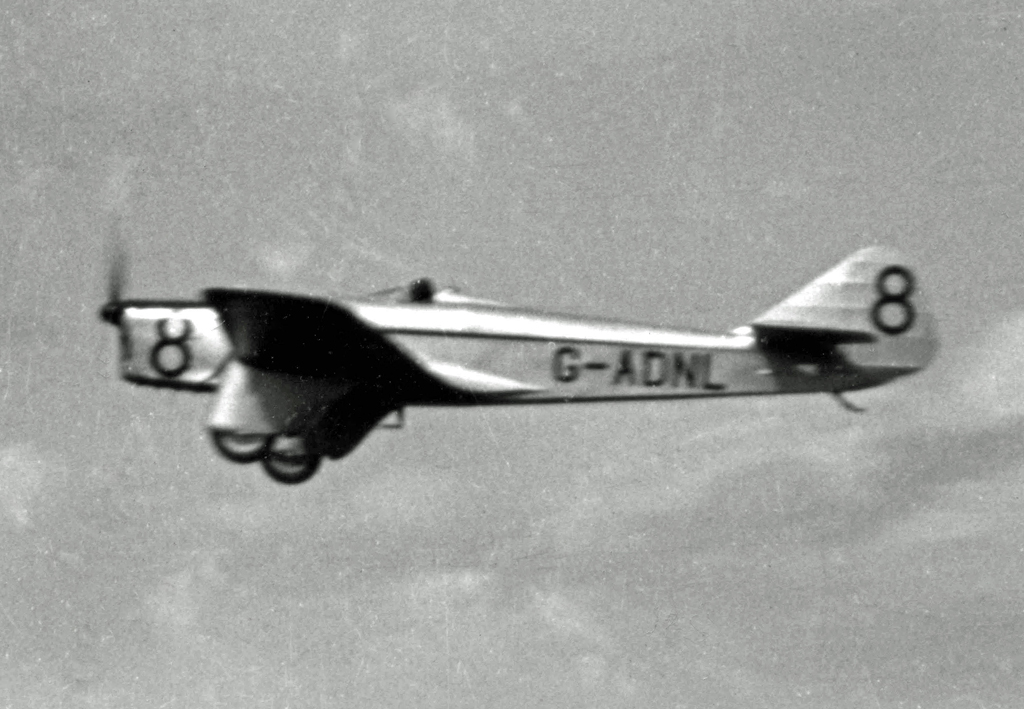
Sparrowhawk prototype in 1949

A further five Sparrowhawks (designated M.5A) were also built as King's Cup Racers and three were delivered to customers but they did not perform spectacularly. In 1936 Victor Smith entered Sparrowhawk G-AELT into the Schlesinger Race from Portsmouth to Johannesburg but had problems with oil after Salonika and eventually retired in Khartoum. The final two M.5A Sparrowhawks were built in 1936 but were not flown until 1940. One was modified and flown to meet a requirement for an experimental aircraft for high-lift flap research with the Royal Aircraft Establishment, it was later de-modified and used as a communications aircraft. The sixth Sparrowhawk was modified with short span wings and wide chord flaps for experimental work.

The prototype, registered G-ADNL, was modified in late 1953 as a jet-powered racer for Fred Dunkerley. The front fuselage and tail unit were modified and it was re-designated the M.77 Sparrowjet. The Sparrowjet was powered by two Turbomeca Palas gas turbine engines fitted in the wing roots and eventually achieved its original purpose and Dunkerley won the King's Cup Race in 1957 at an average speed of 228 mph (367 km/h).

== Operational history ==
The prototype Sparrowhawk survived the Second World War and was flown by Fairey Aviation test pilot C.G.M. Alington in several UK air races until 1950. It was then sold back to Miles and was modified into the M.77 Sparrowjet.

The third Sparrowhawk was sold to South Africa in October 1937 as ZS-ANO. It was fitted with a cabin top and was impressed into service with the South African Air Force in 1940.

== Variants ==
M.5
Prototype single-seat racer with a 147 hp de Havilland Gipsy Major engine, two built
M.5A
Production version with a 130 hp de Havilland Gipsy Major I engine, three built
M.77 Sparrowjet
M.5 prototype modified as a jet racer, powered by two Turbomeca Palas jet engines

== Operators ==
Civil aircraft were flown in South Africa, United Kingdom and the United States and the following military operators:

South Africa

- South African Air Force

United Kingdom

- Royal Aircraft Establishment

== Specifications (M.5) ==
General characteristics

- Crew: One
- Length: 23 ft 6 in (7.16 m)
- Wingspan: 28 ft 0 in (8.53 m)
- Height: 5 ft 7 in (1.70 m)
- Wing area: 138 sq ft (12.8 m^{2})
- Empty weight: 1,080 lb (490 kg)
- Gross weight: 1,750 lb (794 kg)
- Powerplant: 1 × de Havilland Gipsy Major piston engine , 147 hp (110 kW)

Performance

- Maximum speed: 180 mph (290 km/h, 160 kn)
- Range: 415 mi (668 km, 361 nmi)
- Service ceiling: 12,470 ft (3,800 m)

== See also ==
Related lists

- List of aircraft of the SAAF
