= SIPA S.300 =

General information
- Type: Jet primary trainer and liaison aircraft
- National origin: France
- Manufacturer: SIPA, Suresnes
- Designer: Yves Gardan
- Number built: 1

History
- First flight: 4 October 1954 (Note: Other contemporary sources, the works by Green for example, have the date as 4 September.)

The SIPA S.300 was a French turbojet powered basic trainer, claimed to be the first of its kind anywhere. Only one was built, the prototype crashing after a year's development.

== Design and development ==
The SIPA S.300 (Note: Contemporary sources use a variety of name style, including SIPA 300, SIPA S.300, SIPA S.300R and SIPA S-300. Before being painted with its registration letters, the aircraft carried SIPA 300 on its tail (Jane's image).) was claimed by its manufacturer to be the first jet aircraft designed from scratch as an ab initio trainer, though it had a possible alternative role as a liaison aircraft. It was an all-metal low wing monoplane, with a wing sharing outer panels with the slightly earlier S.200 Minijet. The square tipped wing was straight edged, with slight sweep on the leading edge but none on the rear. Flaps stretched from the ailerons to the wing root on the trailing edge and there were hydraulically driven air brakes of the circular plate type.

Pupil and instructor sat in tandem under a fully glazed, continuous but multiframed canopy, each with their own sideways opening access. The rear cockpit was placed between two small, overwing air intakes for the 1.57 kN (350 lbf) Turbomeca Palas turbojet, the exhaust from which exited ventrally well behind the trailing edge. Aft of the exhaust the underside of the fuselage tapered upwards to the tail. The tapered tailplane was placed on top of the fuselage and carried horn balanced elevators; the fin, with a dorsal fillet and balanced rudder were straight tapered, with the latter running down between the elevators to the keel.

== Operational history ==
The S.300 made its first flight on 4 October 1954 piloted by Max Fischl. SIPA displayed F-WGVR at the Paris air show in June 1955, at which time it was undergoing official testing at the Centrre d'Essais en Vol. On 26 September 1955 it was destroyed following a spin; no more were built. The S.300 had been designed to allow the installation of more powerful Turbomeca engines such as the 2.14 kN (480 lbf) Super Palas, 3.53 kN (795 lbf) Aspin II or 3.92 kN (880 lbf) Marboré II but these plans were abandoned with the loss of the prototype.

== Specifications ==
Data from Jane's All the World's Aircraft 1956/7

General characteristics

- Capacity: 2
- Length: 6.71 m (22 ft 0 in)
- Wingspan: 8.02 m (26 ft 4 in)
- Height: 2.57 m (8 ft 5 in) (Note: The works by Green give the height as 1.79 m (5 ft 10½ in) but the general arrangement diagram in Jane's All the World's Aircraft 1956/7 confirms this as too small; it may be an accidental transcription from the Minijet specifications.)
- Wing area: 9.80 m^{2} (105.5 sq ft) gross
- Empty weight: 583 kg (1,285 lb)
- Gross weight: 920 kg (2,028 lb)
- Fuel capacity: 210 L (46 Imp gal, 55 US gal). Optional tip tanks add 100 L (22 Imp gal, 26 US gal)
- Powerplant: 1 × Turbomeca Palas centrifugal turbojet, 1.57 kN (350 lbf) thrust

Performance

- Maximum speed: 360 km/h (220 mph, 190 kn)
- Cruise speed: 312 km/h (194 mph, 168 kn)
- Range: 450 km (280 mi, 240 nmi)
- Service ceiling: 5,050 m (16,570 ft)
- Rate of climb: 4.5 m/s (890 ft/min)
