= Somers-Kendall SK-1 =

SK-1

General information
- Type: Light jet racer
- National origin: United Kingdom
- Manufacturer: Somers-Kendall Aircraft Limited
- Designer: Hugh Kendall
- Number built: 1

History
- First flight: 8 October 1955

The Somers-Kendall SK-1 was a light jet-powered 1950s British two-seat racing monoplane, designed by Hugh Kendall and built by Somers-Kendall Aircraft Limited at Woodley Aerodrome.

== Design and development ==
The SK-1 was a wooden two-seat mid-wing cantilever monoplane with a V-tail and powered by a Turbomeca Palas turbojet mounted above the mid-fuselage. It had a retractable nose wheel and single main wheel landing gear with retractable wingtip outriggers and seating in tandem for two under a one-piece canopy. The SK-1 was designed by Hugh Kendall and built by Somers-Kendall Aircraft Limited, a company he set up with Nat Somers a racing pilot. Built between 1954 and 1955 at Woodley the aircraft registered G-AOBG was first flown on 8 October 1955. The aircraft flown by Nat Somers made an attempt at a 100 km closed circuit speed record for its class but it was frustrated by landing gear problems. The aircraft was retired and stored following an engine failure prior to take-off on 11 July 1957.

== Structure ==
The main structure comprised a spruce main spar and spruce fuselage stringers with a birch 3-ply skin. The front fuselage skins were moulded ply. The wing and rear fuselage were covered from flat sheets of ply. However, in certain areas, notably the top quadrant of the rear fuselage and the top surfaces of the tail surfaces were skinned with light alloy sheet which had been bonded to a thin wooden veneer, enabling them to be glued in the normal manner.

This type of material was also used to make some components such as the control columns and to reinforce the stub spars which supported the tail surfaces.

The nose and tail cones and the wing tips were fibreglass mouldings. The forward engine cowling and the air intakes were moulded from Durestos.

== Systems ==
Undercarriage retraction was pneumatic, using bleed air from the engine. The main landing gear was a Gemini strut and wheel, whilst the nose gear was a Gemini tail wheel assembly. The wingtip outriggers were purpose built. Engine start and instrumentation was electric, as was the gear down/up display. To save weight and space silver-zinc batteries were fitted. Radio and oxygen systems were not fitted.

== Novel construction techniques ==
The aerofoil section was a NACA laminar flow one to have a low profile drag. It was very important, therefore, that the sections be accurately made and surface waviness be kept small. To achieve this, the basic wing structure (spars and ribs) was built in a jig. Accurately profiled root and tip aerofoil sections were made in thick metal and carefully secured to one half wing. Two very straight heavy weight bars were held securely relative to each other and a router was fixed to a carriage which could slide along the bars. Using this set-up the entire half wing profile could be machined very accurately. The process was repeated for the other side. The skins could then be glued to the profiled structure. When work on the aircraft was nearing completion the wing surfaces were coated in epoxy resin and then carefully rubbed down to minimise any waviness. That process took several days, with careful profile checking as it went ahead. Flight observations suggested that the procedure had produced the required result. This is supported by the fact that the measured level speed at sealevel of 323 mph was close to the design estimate of 330 mph.

The fuselage was constructed in a somewhat similar fashion, except that the frames were supported on a stiff central box which could be rotated rather like a lathe. Again the fuselage was routered to shape. A mould for the forward skins was produced by the same method.

== Team ==
Chief designer, test pilot and constructor—Hugh M Kendall

Technician (aerodynamics, structure, drawing, systems) and flight test observer—John C Chaplin

Two carpenters - John Caunter (former flying instructor with No. 8 EFTS at Woodley) and one other unidentified person

Inspector—Douglas Bianchi

Turbomeca provided support staff for supervising the engine installation and monitoring the initial engine runs.

ARB team

R J Fenner—design liaison surveyor

P Hagger—Inspection Surveyor

G Howitt—Test Pilot

Other ARB staff as appropriate

== Specifications ==
Data from British Civil Aircraft since 1919 Volume 3Jane's All The World's Aircraft 1956–57

General characteristics

- Crew: 2
- Length: 20 ft 10.5 in (6.4 m)
- Wingspan: 22 ft 9.5 in (6.95 m)
- Height: 5 ft 6 in (1.68 m)
- Wing area: 65 sq ft (6.0 m^{2})
- Empty weight: 810 lb (367 kg)
- Gross weight: 1,500 lb (680 kg)
- Powerplant: 1 × Turbomeca Palas turbojet , 330 lbf (1.5 kN) thrust

Performance

- Maximum speed: 323 mph (520 km/h, 281 kn)
- Range: 400 mi (645 km, 350 nmi)
- Rate of climb: 1,850 ft/min (9.4 m/s)

== See also ==
Aircraft of comparable role, configuration, and era

- Miles Sparrowjet
