= Miles M.76 =

British two-seat glider, 1954

Kendall K.1
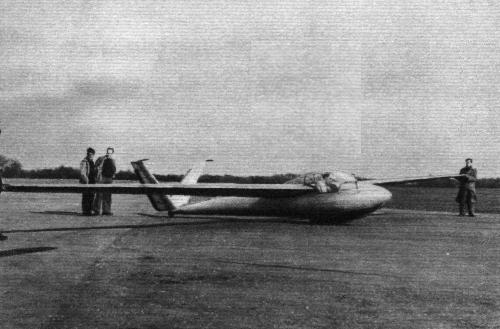

General information
- Type: Competition two seat glider
- National origin: United Kingdom
- Manufacturer: Elliotts of Newbury and Miles Aircraft
- Designer: Hugh Kendall
- Number built: 1

History
- First flight: March 1954
- Developed from: Kendall Crabpot 1 BGA glider design

In 1947 a British Gliding Association design competition, for a two-seat sailplane, was won by Hugh Kendall, Miles' assistant test pilot. It was a side-by-side two seater called the Kendall Crabpot I, with a 60 ft. span and an aspect ratio of 18. A version with a novel asbestos fibre-polymer wing and a wooden fuselage with a butterfly tail was proposed by Miles, but the wing failed under low loads. Elliotts of Newbury built a conventional wooden wing to use with Miles' fuselage. The resulting glider flew, but not well and development was abandoned with just one example built.

== Development ==
The wooden Crabpot was not built as designed but developed in two forms, differing in their wing construction. The most radical version was that part constructed by Kendall's employer, Miles Aircraft. This, known as the Miles M.76, was undertaken for the British Gliding Association, with financial backing for the project from the Miles company, the Kemsley Flying Trust, and the Ministry of Supply. The design included an experimental wing from by the plastics division of F. G. Miles, Ltd., built from a phenolic/asbestos fibre material stabilized with a paper honeycomb, the manufacturing technique being based on the vacuum moulding process pioneered by the Royal Aircraft Establishment at Farnborough. The 60 ft (18.29 m) span wing was to be made in two semi-span sections each consisting of one 30 ft (9.14 m) moulding, considered to be the largest one-piece moulded phenolic/asbestos structures manufactured at that time. The new wing also had a different section from that of the Crabpot, a laminar flow 6- digit NACA airfoil rather than the original 5-digit one. However, the structure proved much weaker under test than intended and was abandoned.

The possible failure of this novel wing to be delivered in time had been anticipated by the building of a wooden wing to the same specification by Elliotts of Newbury, to be fitted to the Miles-built wooden fuselage, shorter than the Crabpot and with a butterfly tail. This glider was known as the Kendall K.1 or by the Elliotts' designation EoN Type 9 K.1 and first flew in March 1954. It was not a success, failing to obtain its certificate of airworthiness because of insoluble spinning characteristics.

== Designer ==
Hugh McLennan Kendall flew with the Fleet Air Arm during the war, and was involved in air-racing prior to and after the war. He was the Chief Test Pilot for Handley Page (Reading), formerly Miles Aircraft Ltd., and as such flight tested many types. He flew the maiden flight of the Mamba powered H.P/Miles Marathon 2. As well as designing the Crabpot, Kendall was the designer and test pilot for the Somers-Kendall SK-1, Britain's first ever light jet. The maiden flight was made by Hugh Kendall on 8 October 1955. After he ended his test flying career, he joined Shell-Mex & BP as technical liaison with the aircraft industry and airlines. He died in 1999.

== Specifications (Kendall K.1) ==
Data from Ellison (1971)

General characteristics

- Crew: Two
- Length: 23 ft 0 in (7.01 m)
- Wingspan: 60 ft 0 in (18.29 m)
- Airfoil: NASA 66_{3}418 at root, 64_{2}415
- Empty weight: 661 lb (300 kg)
- Gross weight: 1,000 lb (454 kg)

Performance

- Maximum speed: 120 mph (200 km/h, 110 kn)
- Stall speed: 40 mph (64 km/h, 35 kn)
- Lift-to-drag: 35:1
