= CVV-6 Canguro =

Italian glider

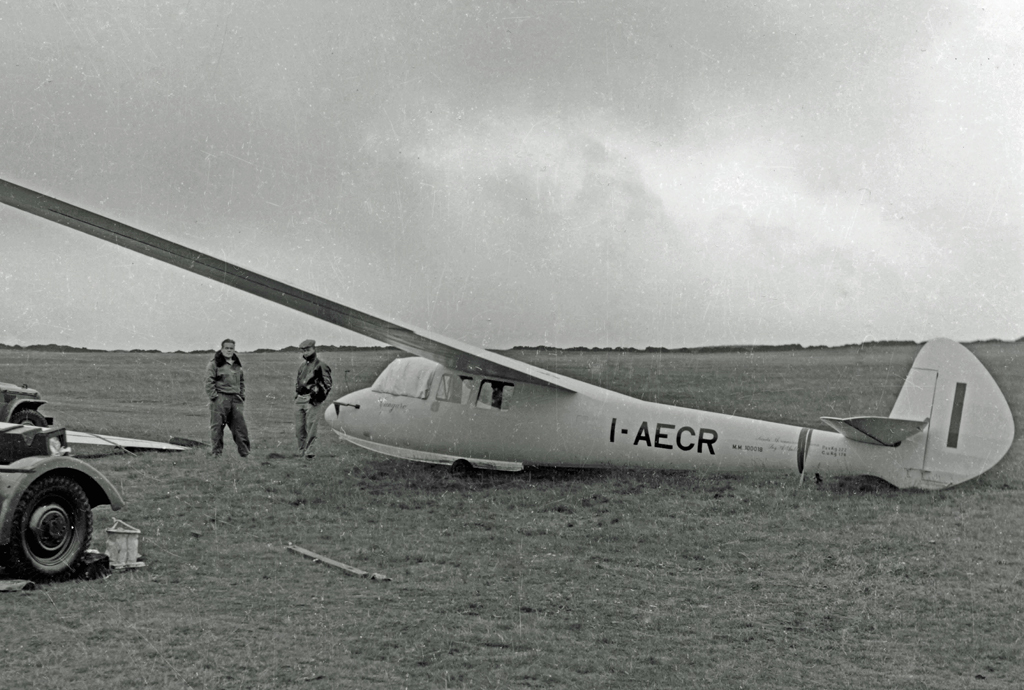
- CVV 6 Canguro I-AECR which was placed second in the 1954 World Gliding Championships held at Great Hucklow, England

General information
- Type: Two seat high performance glider
- National origin: Italy
- Manufacturer: SAI Ambrosini
- Number built: 36

History
- First flight: c.1941

The CVV-6 Canguro (English: Kangaroo) was a high performance two seat glider, designed at Milan Polytechnic University in 1940. A small batch was ordered for the Italian Air Force but few were delivered; more were produced after World War II, becoming the most common Italian gliding club machine. Some were still in use in the 1980s. In 1954 a Canguro came second at the World Gliding Championships at Camphill Great Hucklow, Derbyshire, England. One was modified into a powered aircraft, at first with a piston engine and later with a turbojet.

== Design and development ==
The CVV-6 Canguro was one of a series of gliders designed at the Centro Studi ed Esperienze per il Volo a Vela (CVV) of the Politecnico di Milano between 1934 and 1957. The centre often outsourced the construction of their designs and the first two Canguros were built by the Aeronautica Lombarda, with the first flight in 1941 or 1942. Most of the later aircraft were built by Società d'Aeronautica Italiana Ambrosini, with the result that the type is sometimes referred to as the Ambrosini CVV-6 Canguro.

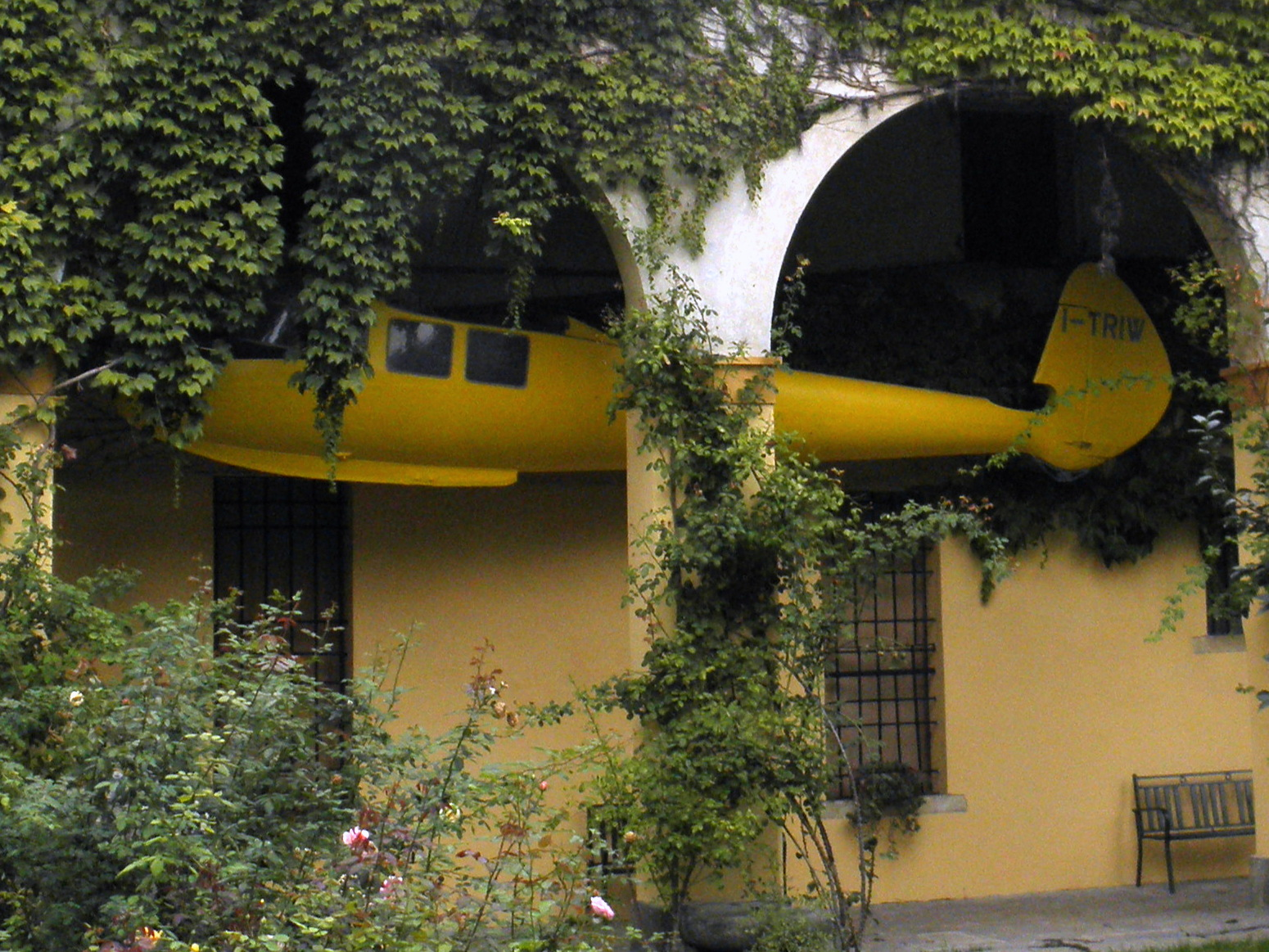
Canguro fuselage on display at the Museo dell'aria e dello spazio San Pelagio, Due Carrare, Province of Padua.

It was an all-wood-framed aircraft, skinned with a mixture of plywood and fabric. High mounted wings were built around single spar with a ply covered D-box leading edge. Behind the spar the wings were largely fabric covered apart from an inboard section containing the CVV-type airbrakes which extended above and below the wing, where the ply skin reached aft to the trailing edge. There was also extra ply skinning inboard of the airbrakes, forward of the oblique, internal drag strut. Outboard of the airbrakes Frise ailerons formed the trailing edge out to rounded tips. In plan the wings were straight tapered, mostly on the trailing edge; they had 8.2° of washout and each could be detached separately for transport.

The oval section monocoque fuselage of the Canguro was entirely ply skinned as was the tailplane, mounted on top of the fuselage, and the narrow fin behind it. The rear control surfaces were fabric covered, with a wide chord, rounded rudder extending to the keel and moving in an elevator cut-out. The crew were seated in tandem in a cabin with a wrap-around windscreen and two rectangular windows on each side. The rear seat was under the wing, with entry from above via a hatch provided with transparencies to give some upward view. The prototype Canguro and those built entirely post-war had a rubber sprung skid for landing, which extended aft beyond the cabin; a drop away wheeled dolly was used for take-off. Those originally intended for the I.A.F. had a fixed wheel at the rear of a shorter skid, though this proved too small.

One Canguro was modified to fly under power by Adriano Mantelli. His first version, flown in 1955 had a 16.4 kW (22 hp) motor mounted on a pylon above the wing. After storm damage this airframe was modified again to take a 1.47 kN (331 lbf) Turbomeca Palas turbojet in place of the rear seat, with a ventral fuselage exhaust below the wing trailing edge. Dating from 1962, it was known as the Canguro Palas. In 1964 Mantelli set a new FAI record for C1b class aircraft of 9,700 m (31,824 ft).

== Operational history ==
In 1943 the Italian Air Force ordered six Canguros, to be built by Ambrosini, but received only one before the fall of the Benito Mussolini regime. The others remained half-built until after the end of World War II, when Ambrosini completed them and produced twenty four more. Three others were built by Meteor SpA and one by a club. Several remained in service in 1982.

A Canguro was the first sailplane to cross the Apennines on 22 April 1953, flown by Adriano Mantelli.

Canguros flew in three World Gliding Championships, competing in the multi-seat or two-seat category. At Madrid in 1952 Mantelli came fourth with teammate Guerrini, flying a second Canguro, in sixteenth place. In 1954 Mantelli and L. Brighini, flying together, came second at Camphill in Derbyshire, UK; two years later A. Brigliadori and Fanoli could only finish eleventh at Saint-Yan, France.

== Variants ==
CVV-6 Canguro
Production glider
CVV-6 Canguro versioni motorizzate (Ambrosini P-25)
Fitted with a 16.4 kW (22 hp) Ambrosini P-25 motor mounted on pylon above the wing; 1955.
CVV-6 Canguro versioni motorizzate (Turbomeca Palas)
The motor glider modified into a single seat version powered by a 1.47 kN (331 lbf) Turbomeca Palas turbojet; 1962.

== Operators ==
Italy

Italian Air Force operated 32 aircraft until 1980s

== Aircraft on display ==
- Museo dell'aria e dello spazio, Castello di San Pelagio, Due Carrare: fuselage of Canguro I-TRIW.
- Italian Air Force Museum, Vigna di Valle: Canguro Palas

== Specifications ==
Data from Sailplanes 1920–1945

General characteristics

- Crew: Two
- Length: 8.00 m (26 ft 3 in)
- Wingspan: 19.20 m (63 ft 0 in)
- Wing area: 21.6 m^{2} (233 sq ft)
- Aspect ratio: 17.0
- Airfoil: root: Göttingen 549 modified; tip: NACA 0012
- Empty weight: 280 kg (617 lb) structure
- Gross weight: 460 kg (1,014 lb)

Performance

- Never exceed speed: 220 km/h (140 mph, 120 kn)
- Maximum glide ratio: 30:1
- Rate of sink: 0.60 m/s (118 ft/min)
- Wing loading: 21.3 kg/m^{2} (4.4 lb/sq ft)
