= KAI-19 =

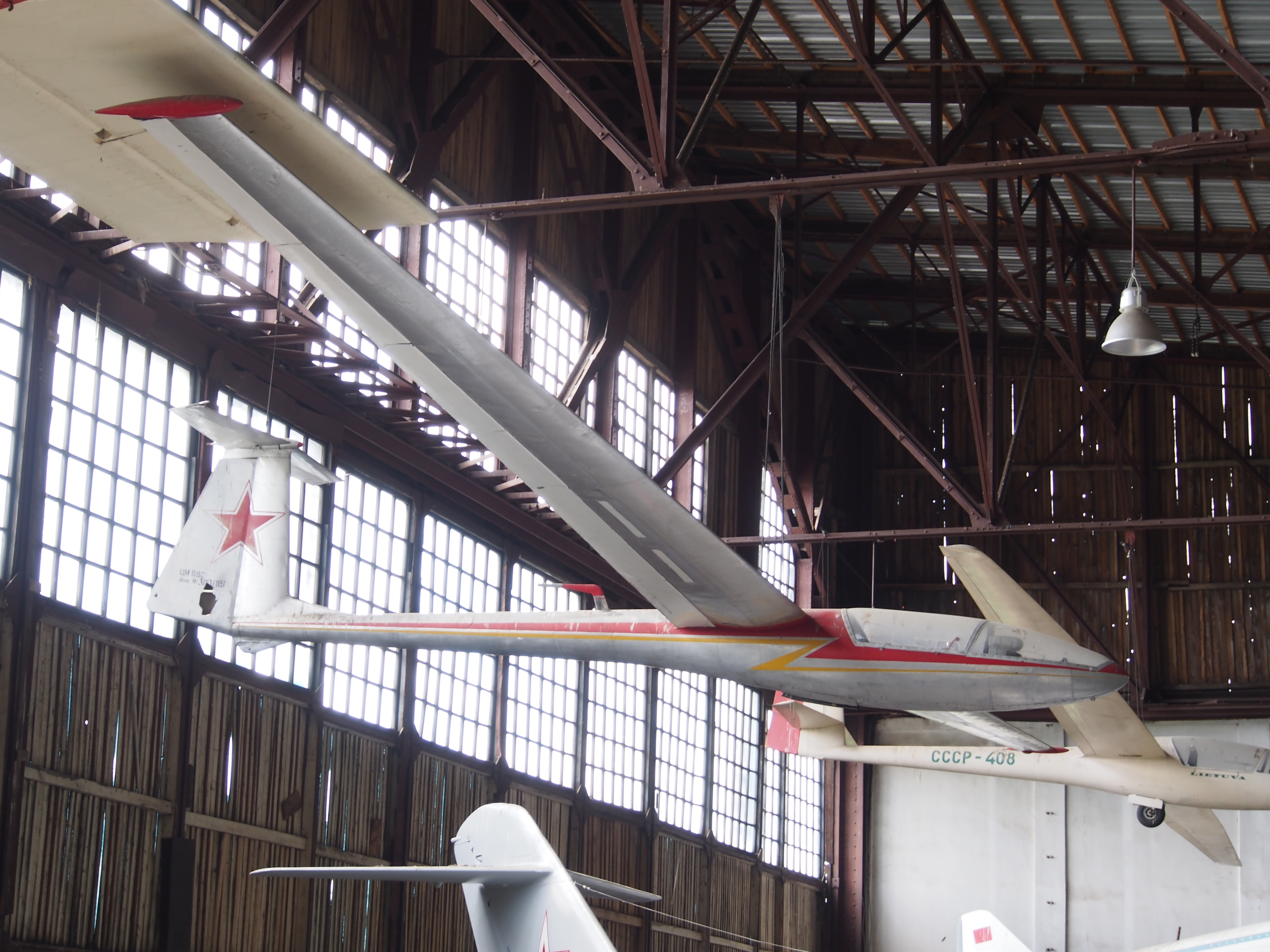
- KAI-19M in the Central Air Force Museum, Monino, Russia.

General information
- Type: High performance, single seat sailplane
- National origin: USSR
- Manufacturer: Kazan Aviation Institute (KAI)
- Designer: Team leader P. Kamychev

History
- First flight: 1963

The KAI-19 was a high performance, all-metal sailplane, built with advanced techniques in the USSR in the early 1960s.

== Design and development ==
The KAI-15 was designed by a team led by P. Kamychev and built at the Kazan Aviation Institute (KAI), flying in 1963. It had chemically milled metal wings to reduce weight and highly polished wing surfaces in an attempt to maintain laminar flow over them, together with a low profile fuselage to minimize drag.

The all-metal shoulder-mounted wings were built around single spars. Their skins were chemically milled to reduce thickness from 800 μm at the roots to 600 μm at the tips while maintaining the original 1200 μm thickness over the spars. They had laminar flow profiles and were tetrahedral in plan out to small salmon tip fairings. Each wing carried a two part aileron and three part flap, all sandwich-cored metal structures.

Its all-metal, semi-monocoque fuselage was slender, with a maximum cross-sectional area of 0.36 m^{2} This was achieved by giving the pilot a strongly reclined position under a two-piece canopy that occupied almost all the fuselage forward of the wing leading edge. Unusually, the cockpit was equipped with oxygen for high altitude flight. Behind the wing the fuselage tapered further to a cantilever T-tail. The broad vertical tail was essentially tetragonal in profile, with a generous rudder. The horizontal tail was also tetragonal but much smaller in area.

The KAI-19 landed on an electrically operated, fully retractable monowheel with an oleo strut and a disc brake.

It was able to launch with a total of 136 L (30 imp gal; 36 US gal) of water ballast. About half of this was in the fuselage, the rest in the wings.

== Operational history ==
Not much is known about its history, beyond a probable first flight year of 1963 and a 1966 report that it had been under test for some months.

== Aircraft on display ==
- An unmarked KAI-19 is displayed in the Central Russian Air Force Museum, Monino.

== Specifications ==
Data from Jane's All the World's Aircraft 1962-3 except where noted

General characteristics

- Crew: one
- Length: 7.96 m (26 ft 1 in)
- Wingspan: 20.00 m (65 ft 7 in)
- Wing area: 14.00 m^{2} (150.7 sq ft)
- Aspect ratio: 28.6
- Airfoil: GX62-184
- Empty weight: 334 kg (736 lb)
- Max takeoff weight: 414 kg (913 lb) without ballast
- Total water ballast capacity: 136 L (30 imp gal; 36 US gal)

Performance

- Maximum speed: 250 km/h (160 mph, 130 kn)
- Stall speed: 59 km/h (37 mph, 32 kn) minimum speed, flaps up
- Maximum glide ratio: best, 45 at 85 km/h (53 mph; 46 kn)
- Rate of sink: 0.59 m/s (116 ft/min)
