= Turbomeca Palas =

1950s French turbojet aircraft engine

Palas
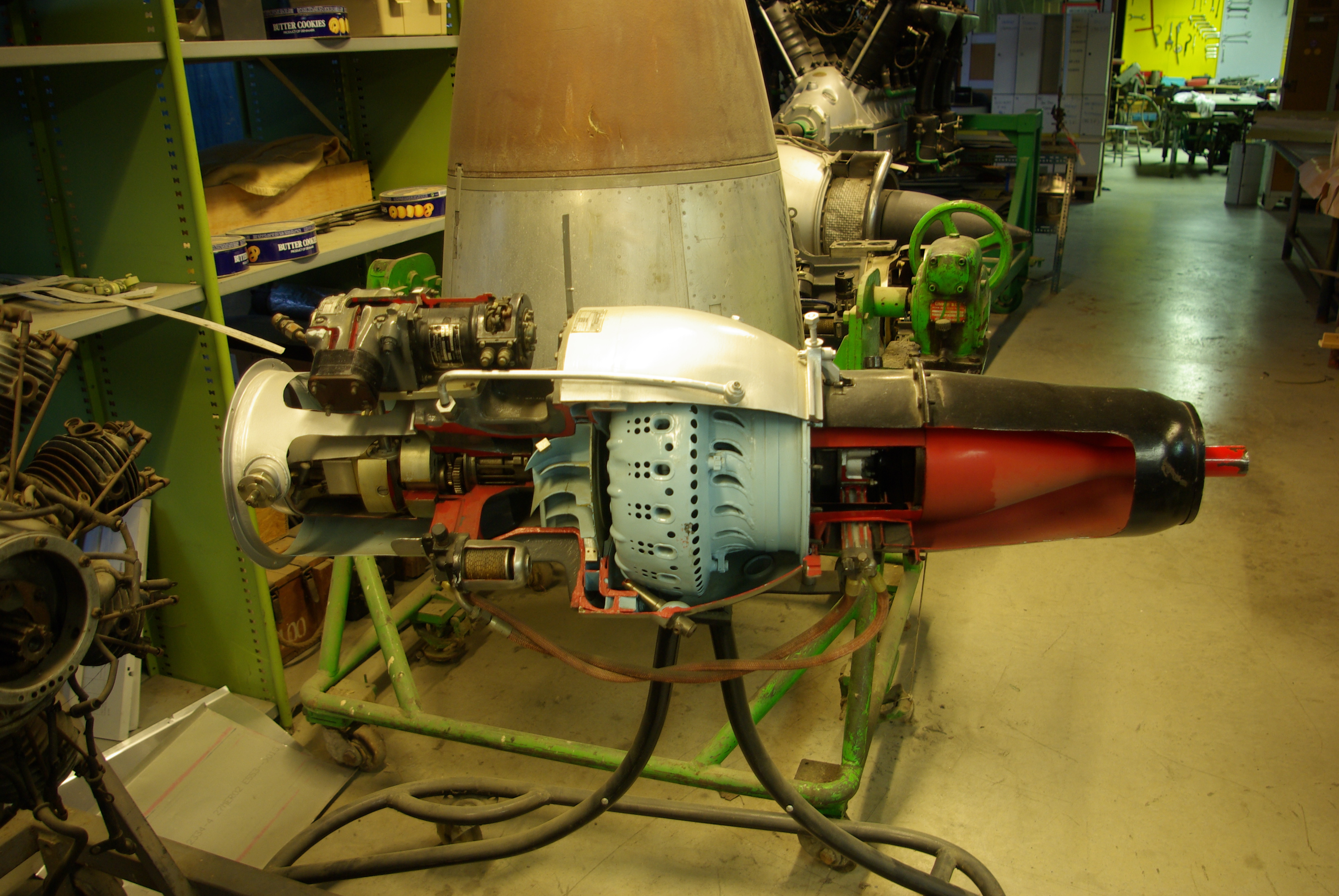
- Sectioned Turbomeca Palas
- Type: Turbojet
- National origin: France
- Manufacturer: Turbomeca
- Major applications: Miles Sparrowjet; Short SB.4 Sherpa
- Developed from: Turbomeca Piméné

The Turbomeca Palas is a diminutive centrifugal flow turbojet engine used to power light aircraft. An enlargement of the Turbomeca Piméné, the Palas was designed in 1950 by the French manufacturer Société Turbomeca, and was also produced under licence by Blackburn and General Aircraft in the United Kingdom and Teledyne Continental Motors in the United States as the Continental Model 320.

== Applications ==
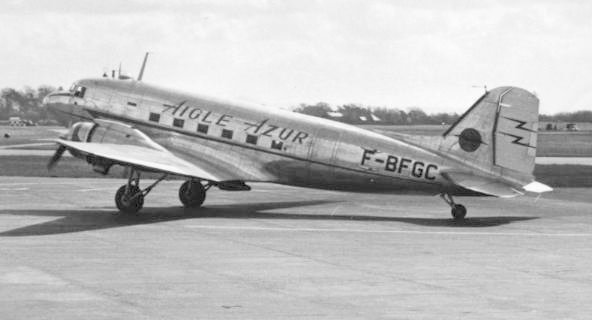
Douglas DC-3 of Aigle Azur (France) arriving at Manchester Airport on 3 April 1953. It is equipped with a ventral Turbomeca Palas booster jet engine for "hot and high operations".

- Caproni Trento F.5
- Curtiss C-46 Commando (two under the fuselage, first flight in October 1952)
- Curtiss C-46F Commando (two under the wings)
- CVV-6 Canguro Palas
- Douglas DC-3 (as a booster engine)
- Fouga CM-8 R9.8 Cyclope
- Fouga CM-8 R8.3 Midget
- Fouga CM.130
- Ikarus 451
- Ikarus S451M
- Ikarus 452M
- Mantelli AM-12
- Miles Sparrowjet
- Payen Pa 49
- Short SB.4 Sherpa
- SIPA S.200 Minijet
- SIPA S.300
- Somers-Kendall SK-1
- Sud-Ouest Bretagne

== Specifications ==
Data from Aircraft engines of the World 1953

==== General characteristics ====
- Type: Turbojet
- Length: 1,200 mm (47 in)
- Diameter: 408 mm (16.1 in)
- Dry weight: 72 kg (159 lb)

==== Components ====
- Compressor: single-stage centrifugal
- Combustors: annular with rotary fuel injection
- Turbine: single-stage with 24 or 25 blades
- Fuel type: Jet A1
- Oil system: dry sump with Turbomeca gear pump at 3.0 bar (43 psi)

==== Performance ====
- Maximum thrust:

Take-off: 1.6 kN (350 lbf)
Max Continuous: 1.27 kN (285 lbf)
Cruising: 0.98 kN (220 lbf)

- Overall pressure ratio: 4:1
- Air mass flow: 3.1 kg/s (6.8 lb/s)
- Turbine inlet temperature:

TIT: 1,123.15 K (850 °C)
JPT: 973.15 K (700 °C)

- Specific fuel consumption: 110 kg/kN/h (1.1 lb/lbf/h)
- Thrust-to-weight ratio: 2.20 (take off), 1.79 (max continuous), 1.38 (cruising).

== See also ==
Related lists

- List of aircraft engines
