= Koželuh =

Koželuh (feminine Koželuhová) is a Czech occupational surname meaning 'tanner' (a person who processes animal hides into leather). Notable people with the surname include:

- Hana Sládková-Koželuhová (born 1928), Czech tennis player
- Jan Antonín Koželuh (1738–1814), Czech composer
- Jan Koželuh (1904–1973), Czech tennis player
- Josef Koželuh (born 2002), Czech footballer
- Karel Koželuh (1895–1950), Czech tennis, football, and ice hockey player
- Mirka Koželuhová (born 1951), Czech tennis player

== See also ==
- Leopold Koželuch (1747–1818), Czech composer and teacher of classical music
