= Kasper Bekas =

American glider

Bekas series

General information
- Type: Glider
- National origin: United States
- Designer: Witold Kasper
- Status: No longer in production
- Number built: 3

History
- Introduction date: 1968
- First flight: April 1968
- Developed from: Brochocki BKB-1

The Kasper Bekas is a family of American mid-wing, tailless gliders designed by Witold Kasper and derived from the earlier 1959 Brochocki BKB-1 design.

== Design and development ==
The Bekas series was an attempt by Kasper to create an experimental tailless glider with a higher glide ratio, better ground handling and rigging, using a flexible wing to study the effects of wing flexing on stability and controllability in flight.

The Bekas is built from wood and covered in plywood. The wing uses a NACA 8-H-12 airfoil and has greater span and higher aspect ratio than the BKB-1 to achieve its goals. The wing features outboard trailing edge control surfaces that act both as elevator for pitch control and aileron for roll control. The wing is swept 15° and has a chord of 38 in (97 cm). The landing gear is a fixed monowheel.

The design resulted in a high glide ratio for a 15 m (49.2 ft) wingspan of 45:1, along with a reasonably low sink rate of 2.0 feet per second.

== Operational history ==
The first Bekas, an "N" model, was built by Kasper in 1968. It was destroyed and removed from FAA records in 1977.

Two others were completed. One model 1-A was started by Al Wilson of Seattle, Washington and completed by Clifford Johnson of Minneapolis, Minnesota in 1972, which features a wider chord wing. The final one was completed by Don Mattson of Seattle.

== Variants ==
Bekas N
The "N" (for narrow wing) was first flown in April 1968.
Bekas 1-A
Variant with longer wing chord.

== Specifications (Bekas N) ==
Data from Sailplane Directory and Soaring

General characteristics

- Crew: one
- Length: 12 ft 0 in (3.66 m)
- Wingspan: 49 ft 3 in (15 m)
- Wing area: 158 sq ft (14.7 m^{2})
- Aspect ratio: 15.3
- Airfoil: NACA 8-H-12
- Empty weight: 350 lb (159 kg)
- Gross weight: 550 lb (249 kg)

Performance

- Maximum glide ratio: 45:1 at 66.5 mph (107 km/h)
- Rate of sink: 120 ft/min (0.61 m/s) at 50 mph (80 km/h)
- Wing loading: 3.48 lb/sq ft (17.0 kg/m^{2})

== See also ==
- List of gliders
