= Brochocki BKB-1 =

Single-seat Canadian glider, 1959

BKB-1
- BKB-1

General information
- Type: Experimental glider
- National origin: Canada
- Designer: Stefan Brochocki
- Status: Sole example destroyed in 1971
- Number built: one

History
- Introduction date: 1959
- Variant: Kasper Bekas

The Brochocki BKB-1 was a Canadian mid-wing, single-seat, experimental tailless glider that was designed and constructed by Stefan Brochocki with assistance from Witold Kasper and A. Bodek. The designation indicated the contributions of all three men. The aircraft was intended to study flight above the stall angle.

== Design and development ==
The BKB-1 was constructed in 1959 and built entirely from wood. The 39 ft (11.9 m) wing was swept, had a 9.5:1 aspect ratio and employed a NACA 8-H-12 airfoil. The aircraft had a very high wing area of 160 sq ft (15 m^{2}) which resulted in a light wing loading of just 3.81 lb/sq ft (18.6 kg/m^{2}).

The prototype BKB-1 was originally registered in Canada as CF-ZDK-X. Later it was moved to the United States, owned by Kasper and registered as N2991G.

As a testbed the aircraft went through several modification states. The modifications included aerodynamic devices to improve aircraft control above the stalling angle. These reduced the stall speed to 20 mph (32 km/h) and resulted in a 200 ft/min (1.0 m/s) rate of descent while stalled. This allowed stalled landings with no ground roll. As a result of these and other design changes the aircraft was designated as the BKB-1A, the "A" indicating aerobatics. The aircraft was intended to be fully aerobatic, including tumbling maneuvers.

Kasper had a plan to produce the aircraft and the developmental derivative Kasper Bekas, which mount different wings to a common fuselage, as a single kit, with the choice of wings, but it seems none was actually produced.

== Operational history ==
The sole BKB-1A was destroyed on 6 November 1971 near Arlington, Washington, when a pilot conducted unauthorized aerobatics in the aircraft, subjecting it to an estimated negative 30g during a high-speed inverted descent. The 31-year-old commercial pilot, who had a total of 3000 flying hours and five hours on type, was wearing a parachute, but did not bail out and was killed in the accident. The National Transportation Safety Board cited as cause factors that the pilot misjudged the aircraft's speed and overstressed the airframe to failure.

== Variants ==
BKB-1
Early configuration of the aircraft
BKB-1A
Later configuration of the same aircraft with modifications for parachute flight above the stalling angle and also aerobatics.

== Specifications (BKB-1) ==
Data from Soaring The World's Sailplanes:Die Segelflugzeuge der Welt:Les Planeurs du Monde Volume II

General characteristics

- Crew: one
- Length: 9 ft 10 in (3 m)
- Wingspan: 39 ft (12 m)
- Wing area: 155 sq ft (14.4 m^{2})
- Aspect ratio: 10
- Airfoil: NACA 8-H-12
- Empty weight: 370 lb (168 kg)
- Gross weight: 571 lb (259 kg)

Performance

- Stall speed: 35 mph (56 km/h, 30 kn)
- Never exceed speed: 101 mph (162 km/h, 87 kn)
- Rough air speed max: 162 km/h (100.7 mph; 87.5 kn)
- Aerotow speed: 140 km/h (87.0 mph; 75.6 kn)
- Winch launch speed: 100 km/h (62.1 mph; 54.0 kn)
- g limits: +5.33 -2.67 at 162 km/h (100.7 mph; 87.5 kn)
- Maximum glide ratio: 30:1 at 87 km/h (54.1 mph; 47.0 kn)
- Rate of sink: 142 ft/min (0.72 m/s) at 71 km/h (44.1 mph; 38.3 kn)
- Wing loading: 3.7 lb/sq ft (18 kg/m^{2})

== See also ==
Related lists

- List of gliders
