= Kortenbach & Rauh =

German steel and umbrella manufacturer

Kortenbach GmbH
- Company type: Gesellschaft mit beschränkter Haftung
- Industry: Metalworking
- Founders: August Kortenbach; Carl Rauh
- Headquarters: Solingen, Germany
- Products: Umbrellas, stamping parts
- Website: kortenbach.de

Kortenbach & Rauh is a German steel manufacturer and umbrella manufacturer. The company is based in Solingen, Germany.

The business partners August Kortenbach and Carl Rauh founded their manufacturing plant in Solingen, then a part of Prussia. The company became one of the leading umbrella frame manufacturers in the country.

In 1982 the company took over the traditional company Knirps.

The company also produced the Kortenbach & Rauh Kora 1, which was an unusual twin boom, pusher configuration motor glider, designed and built in Germany in the 1970s and intended as a training aircraft.
