= Kasprzyk =

Kasprzyk is a Polish surname. It may refer to:

- Ewa Kasprzyk (born 1957), Polish actress
- Ewa Kasprzyk (born 1957), Polish athlete
- Marian Kasprzyk (1939–2026), Polish boxer
- Stephen Kasprzyk (born 1982), American rower
