= SIPA S.200 Minijet =

French light sporting jet aircraft

S.200 Minijet
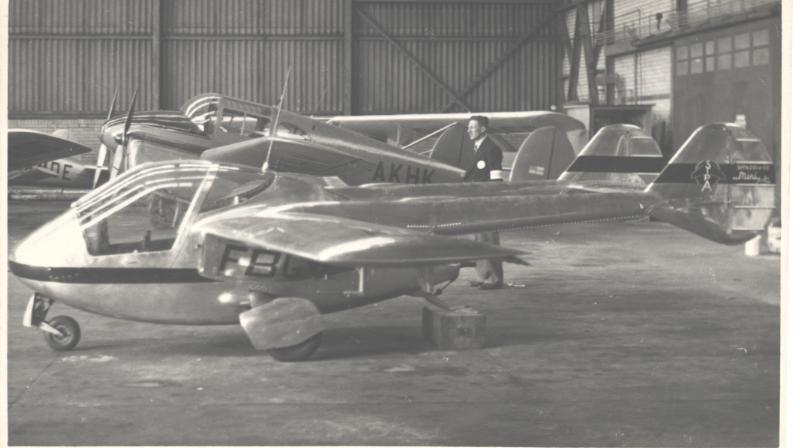
- F-BGVM at Leeds (Yeadon) Airport in May 1955 after giving an aerobatic display

General information
- Type: Light sporting jet
- National origin: France
- Manufacturer: Societe Industrielle Pour l'Aeronautique (SIPA)
- Status: two survivors
- Number built: 7

History
- First flight: 14 January 1952

The SIPA S.200 Minijet was a light sporting jet aircraft designed and produced by the French aircraft manufacturer Société Industrielle Pour l’Aéronautique (SIPA). It is designed to perform liaison, training, and aerobatic flights. The Minijet was claimed to be the first jet-powered light touring aircraft

The Minijet is a compact aircraft with an unusual twin boom configuration, a twin-seat cabin, and powered by a single Turbomeca Palas turbojet engine. It was designed during the early 1950s, being exhibited to the public at the 1951 Paris Air Show while the first prototype performed its maiden flight on 14 January 1952. In addition to two prototypes, five Minijets was constructed between 1955 and 1956; further batches were planned but cancelled due to a protracted downturn in the general aviation sector. Two examples of the Minijet, one in France and the other in the United States, are believed to still exist in preservation. A single example has been reengined with a more powerful General Electric T58 and was flightworthy as of 2006.

== Development ==
The Minijet was developed and produced by the Société Industrielle Pour l’Aéronautique (SIPA), which had been founded in 1938 by Emile Dewoitine. During February 1951, work on developing the aircraft commenced under the experienced aeronautical designer Yves Gardan. At the time, it was a novel concept, being the first civilian-orientated jet-powered airplane to enter production.

Keen to promote its ground-breaking aircraft, SIPA unveiled the first Minijet prototype to the general public at the 1951 Paris Air Show. On 14 January 1952, the first of two prototypes conducted its maiden flight. Around this time, its manufacturer issued public claims that the Minijet was the world's first jet-powered light touring aircraft.

A pre-production batch of five Minijets was built between 1955 and 1956; however, plans to construct further batch were postponed and eventually cancelled entirely. This outcome has been attributed to a general recession in the general aviation sector that let to little interest being expressed in the Minijet and fatally hampering sales of the type.

== Design ==
The SIPA S.200 Minijet was designed for the dual role of high-speed, short-range liaison and transitional training. The basic configuration of the Minijet comprised a shoulder-wing and twin booms that supported the vertical stabilisers, along with a tail plane that connected the two booms. This arrangement broadly resembled that of the de Havilland Vampire, a jet-powered fighter aircraft of the 1940s. The Minijet's compact cabin was located in the central fuselage nacelle and accommodated two persons in a side-by-side seating arrangement. The entire canopy hinged forward to assist access to the small cabin; entry was via large gull-wing doors on either side of the fuselage. From the second prototype onwards, the Minijet was fitted with attachment points for auxiliary wingtip fuel tanks which accommodated 15 gallons each; the internal fuel capacity, comprising a pair of small fuel tanks in each wing that feed into a central sump tank, could only hold up to 55 gallons, somewhat limiting the aircraft's range.

Power for the Minijet was provided by a single Turbomeca Palas turbojet engine, capable of generating up to 330 lb of thrust. This was a relatively limited amount of power, resulting in the Minijet possessing a low thrust-to-weight ratio. The engine is positioned almost directly behind the cabin, the rear of which acts as a firewall. Airflow to the engine was supplied via a pair of air intakes, one in each of the wing roots. To prevent the engine making contact with the runway during flaring, a tail skid is present beneath the engine exhaust. The rudders are atypically small, but are seldom used in routine flight. Ground steering is accomplished using differential braking via conventional toe brakes.

The wings of the Minijet are fitted with double-slotted hydraulically-actuated Fowler flaps, which are extended to 12 degrees for takeoff; they are controlled via a unique H-style selector lever on the console. During flight, this same selector lever is used both to raise and extend the flaps, as well as to retract and deploy the landing gear. In line with the intention to sell the Minijet as a military trainer, the cockpit controls are reminiscent of contemporary trainer and fighter aircraft; each pilot is able to operate the control stick right-handed and the throttle left-handed. According to aviation reporter Barry Schiff, the Minijet is relatively easy to manoeuvre in flight, and is fitted with pleasing flight controls. The Minijet was stressed to perform aerobatic manoeuvres, possessing a 9-G limit load factor, but it has not been approved for snap rolls; it can be flown inverted for a maximum of 20 seconds.

== Survivors ==
In 1993, a Californian aircraft broker discovered a Minijet stored in Florida and had its engine replaced with a General Electric T58, providing 800 lb of thrust, a 142-percent increase in thrust over the original Turbomeca Palas powerplant.

The final production Minijet F-PDHE has survived into the twenty-first century, being presently owned by the Collection Bezard at Persan-Beaumont Airport NW of Paris and can be seen by prior arrangement only. Another survivor exists in the United States.

== Specifications ==
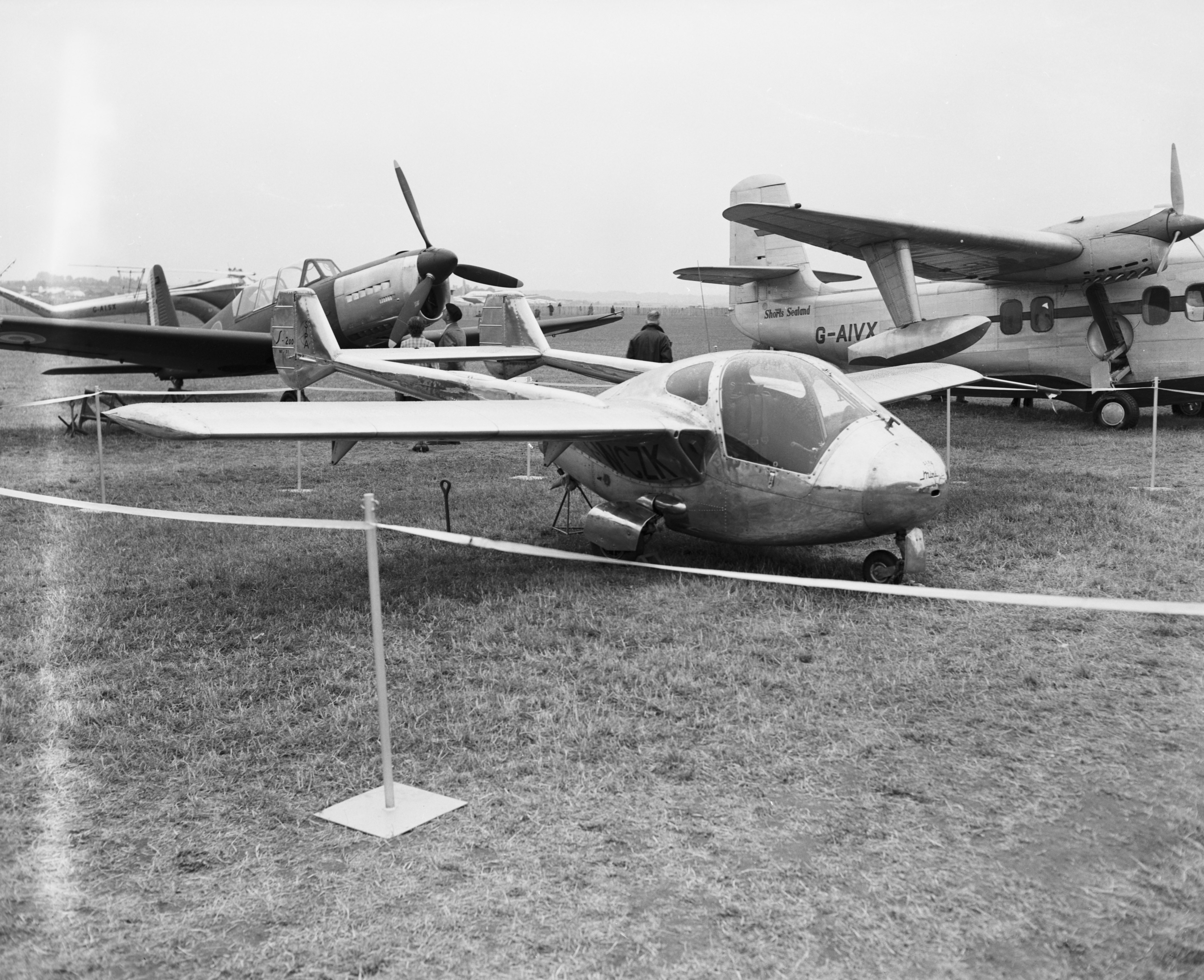
SIPA S.200 Minijet at 1953 Paris International Air Show

Data from The Aircraft of the World

General characteristics

- Crew: 2
- Length: 5.18 m (17 ft 0 in)
- Wingspan: 8.0 m (26 ft 3 in)
- Height: 1.78 m (5 ft 10 in)
- Wing area: 9.6 m^{2} (104 sq ft)
- Empty weight: 523 kg (1,153 lb)
- Gross weight: 880 kg (1,940 lb)
- Powerplant: 1 × Turbomeca Palas , 1.5 kN (330 lbf) thrust

Performance

- Maximum speed: 398 km/h (248 mph, 216 kn)
- Cruise speed: 358 km/h (223 mph, 194 kn)
- Range: 563 km (350 mi, 300 nmi) without tip-tanks
- Service ceiling: 7,927 m (26,000 ft)
- Rate of climb: 5.75 m/s (1,140 ft/min)

== See also ==
Aircraft of comparable role, configuration, and era

- Bede BD-5
- CMC Leopard
- Dale Weejet 800
- Promavia Jet Squalus
