= Kortenbach & Rauh Kora 1 =

German two-seat motor glider, 1973

Kora 1

General information
- Type: Pusher configuration motorglider trainer
- National origin: Germany
- Manufacturer: Kortenbach & Rauh
- Designer: Schultes, Seidel and Putz
- Number built: 2

History
- First flight: 13 September 1973

The Kortenbach & Rauh Kora 1 was an unusual twin boom, pusher configuration motor glider, designed and built in Germany in the 1970s and intended as a training aircraft.

== Design and development ==
The Kora was a two-seat side by side motorglider, intended as a trainer. Its long span, high aspect ratio wing gave it a respectable gliding performance. The overall layout was unusual, with a central pod fuselage in front of a pusher configuration engine and with its empennage on twin tail booms. It had a powered aircraft style tricycle undercarriage.

The Kora was an all-wood aircraft and its constructors, Kortenbach & Rauh, were best known as furniture makers. It had a cantilever high wing with a constant chord centre section and tapered outer panels. Schempp-Hirth airbrakes opened over the upper, inner wing surfaces from mid-chord. The central pod was broad, housing a cockpit 1,200 mm (47 in) wide under a starboard-side opening, two piece canopy which reached from the wing leading edge almost to the nose. Instructor and pupil sat side-by-side, with the 48 kW (64 hp) Limbach SL 1700EC1 air cooled flat four piston engine behind them, where the wing became broader to allow propeller clearance.

Two slender, tapering booms ran rearwards from the wing, each ending at a straight edged fin which tapered both above and below it. A tapered, straight edged tailplane was carried on top of the fins, projecting outwards. The rudders and one piece elevator were rectangular.

Two prototypes were built, the first flying ion 13 September 1973. This had a fully retracting tricycle undercarriage with mainwheels retracting rearwards into the tail booms and the nosewheel rearwards into the fuselage pod. The second prototype, which flew in 1976, retained the retractable nosewheel but had fixed, spatted mainwheels on thin, cantilever, spring steel legs mounted on the lower fuselage to save weight and reduce complexity. The extra drag reduced the glide angle from 31.4 to 30 and increased the minimum sink rate from 0.76 m/s (150 ft/min) to 0.85 m/s (167 ft/min).

The second prototype was still undergoing flight tests early in 1978, when no decision on production had been reached despite orders for some twelve aircraft. It remained on the German civil aircraft register in 2010.

== Specifications (fixed undercarriage) ==
Data from Jane's World Sailplanes and Motor Gliders, p.69

General characteristics

- Crew: Two
- Length: 7.40 m (24 ft 3 in)
- Wingspan: 18.0 m (59 ft 1 in)
- Height: 1.85 m (6 ft 1 in)
- Wing area: 19.44 m^{2} (209.3 sq ft)
- Aspect ratio: 16.65
- Airfoil: Wortmann FX-66-S-196/161
- Empty weight: 510 kg (1,124 lb)
- Max takeoff weight: 750 kg (1,653 lb)
- Powerplant: 1 × Limbach SL 1700EC1 air cooled flat four piston engine, 48 kW (65 hp)
- Propellers: 2-bladed Hoffmann propellers two blade, variable pitch, feathering, pusher, 1.60 m (5 ft 3 in) diameter

Performance

- Maximum speed: 205 km/h (127 mph, 111 kn) at sea level
- Stall speed: 65 km/h (40 mph, 35 kn)
- Maximum glide ratio: best, 30:1 at 100 km/h (54 kn; 62 mph)
- Rate of climb: 3.0 m/s (590 ft/min) maximum
- Rate of sink: 0.85 m/s (167 ft/min) at 85 km/h (46 kn; 53 mph)
- Wing loading: 38.58 kg/m^{2} (7.90 lb/sq ft) maximum
