= KAI-14 =

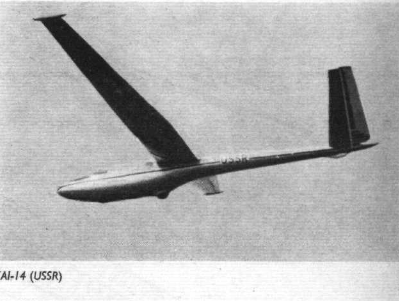

General information
- Type: Competition sailplane
- National origin: USSR
- Manufacturer: Kazan Aviation Institute
- Designer: (lead) M.P. Simonov
- Number built: 3

History
- First flight: c.1962

The KAI-14 was a Standard Class sailplane designed and built in the USSR in the 1960s. Two participated in the World Gliding Championships of 1965.

== Design and development ==
The Standard Class (single seat, 15 m (49 ft 3 in) span) KAI-14 was an all-metal aircraft designed and built at the Kazan Aviation Institute by a team led by M.P. Simonov in the USSR in the early 1960s. It was a shoulder wing, cantilever monoplane. The leading edge had a forward sweep of 2° and its trailing edge was compound tapered. The wing terminated with small streamlined bodies known as salmons and was rigged with 4° of dihedral. Its inset hinged ailerons were each divided into two sections and small area airbrakes were mounted inboard. A braking parachute was deployed when landing.

The metal semi-monocoque fuselage had a forward section which contained the cockpit ahead of the wing leading edge but became markedly slimmer aft, in pod and boom style. The KAI-14 had a 90° butterfly tail with straight tapered surfaces, squared tips and externally mass-balanced elevators. It landed on a fixed monowheel, faired into the fuselage underside, which had a brake operated via the airbrake lever. The rear fuselage was protected by a tail bumper.

The KAI-14's cockpit could be configured in two ways, either with the pilot reclining under a long, fuselage contour following, one piece canopy or sitting upright under a shorter, raised canopy. The first arrangement gave lower drag, the second better vision; the latter is sometimes referred to as the "trainer canopy".

== Operational history ==
The first flight was made about 1962. It was first seen in the West when two examples were entered as Standard Class competitors at the World Gliding Championships of 1965, held at South Cerney in England. Both were damaged in landing accidents and failed to fly the complete programme. Though one, no.79 piloted by Suslov, was repaired by the RAF and did return to the contest fitted with the trainer canopy in place of its earlier long canopy, they finished together at the bottom of the points table.

A third KAI-14 was used in the USSR for spinning tests and to gather performance data. Though sources suggest that serial production was intended, they do not record that happening.

== Specifications ==
Data from Jane's World Sailplanes and Motor Gliders, p.196

General characteristics

- Length: 5.82 m (19 ft 1 in)
- Wingspan: 15.00 m (49 ft 3 in)
- Wing area: 10.0 m^{2} (108 sq ft)
- Aspect ratio: 22.5
- Airfoil: NACA 63(420)-517
- Max takeoff weight: 260 kg (573 lb)

Performance

- Maximum speed: 250 km/h (160 mph, 130 kn) diving
- Maximum glide ratio: 39:1
- Rate of sink: 0.58 m/s (114 ft/min) at 90 km/h (56 mph; 49 kn)
- Wing loading: 26.0 kg/m^{2} (5.3 lb/sq ft)
- Landing speed: 80 km/h (50 mph; 43 kn)
