= Miles Sparrowjet =

Aircraft

M.77 Sparrowjet
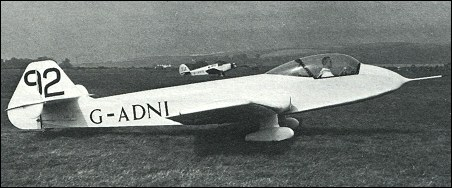

General information
- Type: Racing aircraft
- National origin: United Kingdom
- Manufacturer: F.G. Miles Limited
- Primary user: racing pilot owner
- Number built: 1

History
- First flight: 14 December 1953
- Developed from: Miles Sparrowhawk

The Miles M.77 Sparrowjet was a twin-engined jet-powered racing aircraft built by the British aircraft manufacturer F.G. Miles Limited. It was a one-off conversion, involving the fitting of Turbomeca Palas turbojet engines to the prototype Miles Sparrowhawk, enabling the aircraft to achieve higher performance than could be achieved with its conventional piston engine arrangement.

The Sparrowhawk had been a racing aircraft developed and produced in small numbers by Miles Aircraft during the 1930s. During the late 1950s, the owner of one such aircraft, Fred Dunkerley, requested that Miles look into converting the type to use jet propulsion for greater performance. During December 1959, the company received the aircraft to perform the extensive modification programme; in addition to the installation of French Palas turbojets, the original piston engine was eliminated while the forward fuselage was entirely replaced and rebuilt with the cockpit in a more forward position. The conversion took almost three years to perform.

On 14 December 1953, the completed Sparrowjet conducted its maiden flight. While the aircraft proved to be capable of speeds in excess of 200 mph, it was noted to accelerate somewhat slowly. Its owner quickly put it to use as a somewhat unique racing aircraft for the era, a factor which likely aided the Sparrowjet in multiple victories, including the SBAC Challenge Cup on 21 May 1956, and the King's Cup Race on 13 July 1957, the latter in which the aircraft had reported attained a maximum speed of 228 mph (367 km/h). However, the Sparrowjet was heavily damaged by a hangar fire while being stored at RAF Upton during July 1964, ending its racing career.

== Design and development ==
During the 1930s, the British aviation company Miles Aircraft produced half a dozen Miles Sparrowhawks, a piston-powered racing aircraft. The prototype, G-ADNL, was raced by multiple owners throughout the late 1930s and 1940s, often emerging as the victor. During the late 1940s, it was acquired by racing enthusiast Fred Dunkerley who approached Miles to convert the aircraft to harness the recently developed method of jet propulsion as a means of increasing performance.

Extensive modifications were made to the airframe, including the replacement of the forward fuselage and tail. As one means of addressing the center of balance changes from removing the forward-mounted piston engine, a seven foot extension was added to the forward fuselage and the pilot was moved well forward, and seated under a clear canopy. The new cockpit provided its pilot with excellent visibility which was particularly helpful in racing enabling the pilot to monitor the positions of other racing aircraft.

The French Turbomeca Palas, a centrifugal flow turbojet engine, was selected, and in order to accommodate a pair of these within the wing root, the wing received additional modifications. Eliminating the propeller reduced the required ground clearance, and a new much shorter undercarriage was installed. To reflect the extensive changes, the aircraft was redesignated as the M.77 Sparrowjet.

In December 1950, the Sparrowhawk arrived at Miles' Redhill facility to commence conversion but mid-way through the conversion in 1952, Miles relocated to Shoreham, with the Sparrowhawk relocated by road. The completed Sparrowjet made its first flight on 14 December 1953, when George Miles also made his first flight in a jet-powered aircraft. It was found that the aircraft's maximum speed was in excess of 200 mph (320 km/h), although a poor rate of acceleration was also observed, a factor that has been attributed to the power output of the Palas engine being a somewhat modest 330 lb (150 kg) per engine at sea level.

== Operational history ==
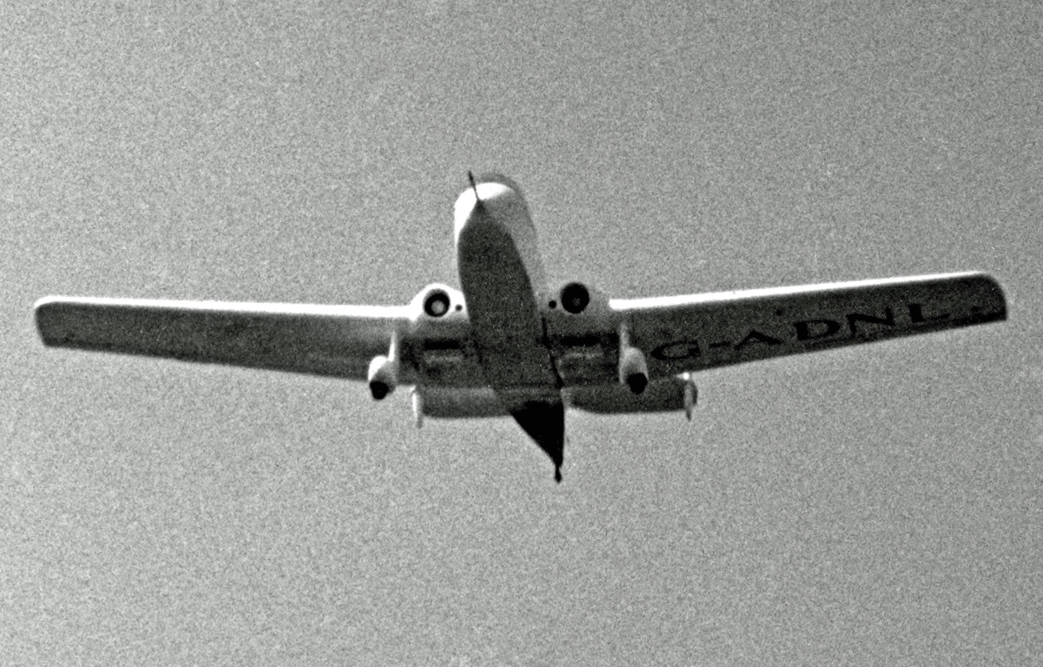
The Miles Sparrowjet competing in an air race at Leeds (Yeadon) Airport in 1955

Following the completion of modification work to become the Sparrowjet, the aircraft was accepted by Dunkerley and quickly entered into various air races, such as the Goodyear Air Challenge Trophy at Shoreham on 28 August 1954. In addition to racing, the Sparrowjet also performed numerous aerial displays, including one at Baginton during the Royal Aero Club race in July, where it had been prevented from participating in the race directly owing to an air starter fault. Prior to the discovery of the fault, the occasion had been intended to be the Sparrowjet's racing debut; this would occur roughly two months later at the Southern Aero Club Invitation Race, which was also held at Shoreham.

The Sparrowjet's performance was such that, in several different races, the aircraft managed to surpass all of its competitors. It was being piloted by Dunkerley when the Sparrowjet won the SBAC Challenge Cup at Yeadon, West Yorkshire on 21 May 1956, having reportedly achieved an average speed of 197.5 mph. On 13 July 1957, the King's Cup Race was also won by the Sparrowjet, having attained a maximum speed of 228 mph (367 km/h) while doing so. This race was a particular triumph for Miles as aircraft built by the firm had achieved first, second, third, fourth and fifth places, a feat that has never been achieved by any other manufacturer according to aviation author Don Brown.

For a time, the Sparrowjet was based at British European Airways's (BEA) main engineering base. During the early 1960s, it was transferred to RAF Upton in Wiltshire, England. The Sparrowjet was in storage at RAF Upton when it was severely damaged by a hangar fire in July 1964; at the time, it was only partially assembled, with items such as its engines having been removed. During 2004, the remains of the Sparrowjet were reportedly being rebuilt by a group based in the Bristol area, who were said to be making use of discarded components from the 1950/53 conversion to aid the restoration effort. The rebuild was still ongoing in early 2012.

According to aviation author Don Berliner, the Sparrowjet remains the only custom built turbojet-powered racing aircraft to have ever participated in officially recognised pylon racing.

== Specifications ==
Data from Miles Aircraft since 1925, British Civil Aircraft 1919–1972:Volume III

General characteristics

- Crew: 1
- Length: 30 ft 9.5 in (9.385 m)
- Wingspan: 28 ft 6 in (8.69 m)
- Height: 7 ft 2 in (2.18 m)
- Wing area: 156 sq ft (14.5 m^{2})
- Aspect ratio: 5.2
- Airfoil: root: NACA; tip: NACA
- Empty weight: 1,578 lb (716 kg)
- Gross weight: 2,400 lb (1,089 kg)
- Powerplant: 2 × Turbomeca Palas turbojet engine, 330 lbf (1.5 kN) thrust each

Performance

- Maximum speed: 228 mph (367 km/h, 198 kn)
- Range: 270.5 mi (435.3 km, 235.1 nmi)
- Rate of climb: 2,100 ft/min (11 m/s)

485 ft/min (2.46 m/s) on one engine

- Wing loading: 15.4 lb/sq ft (75 kg/m^{2})
