= Kazan National Research Technical University =

Russian university

Coordinates: 55°47′50″N 49°06′51″E

Kazan National Research Technical University named after A.N.Tupolev-KAI (KNRTU-KAI)
- Казанский национальный исследовательский технический университет им. А.Н. Туполева-КАИ (КНИТУ-КАИ)
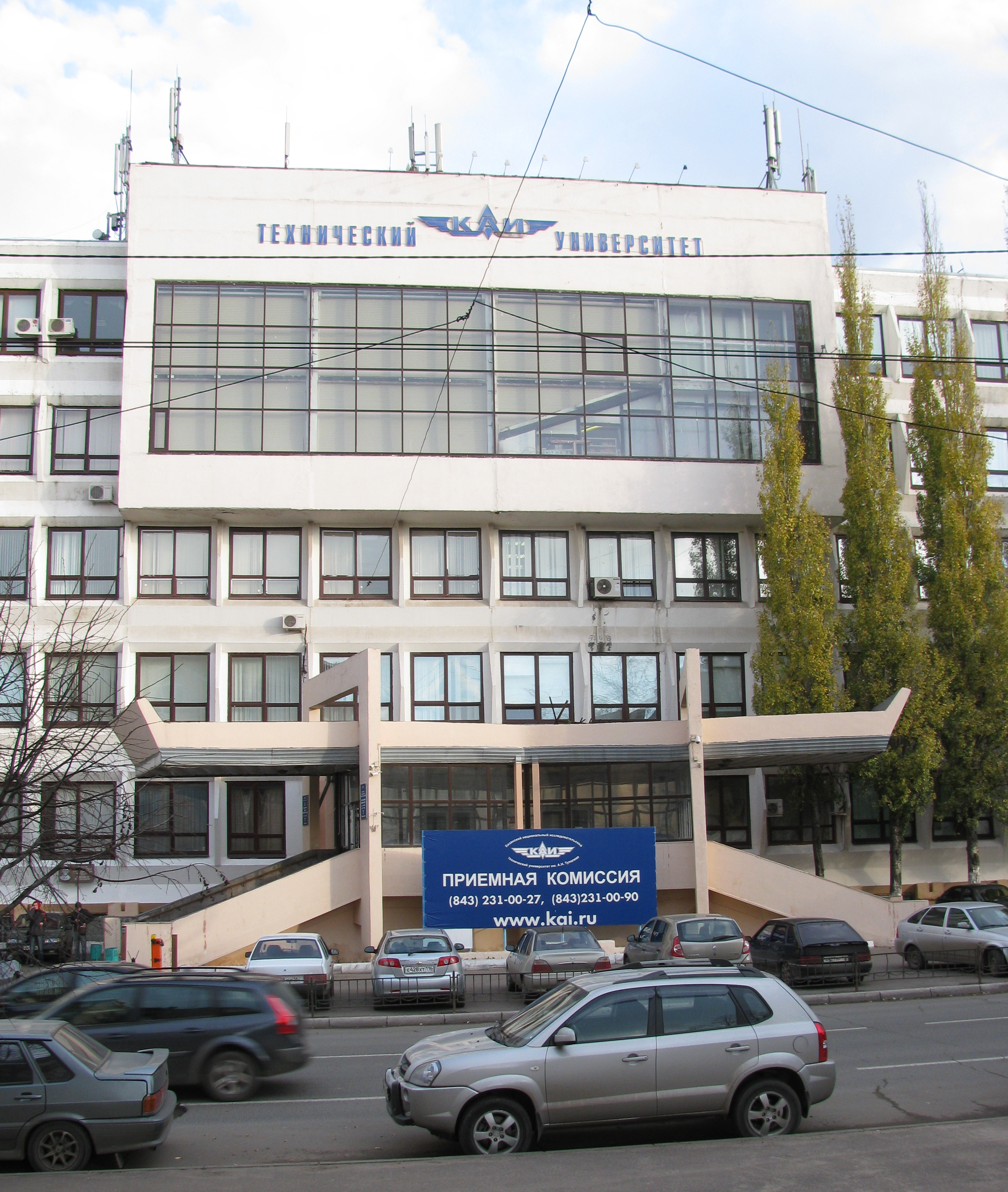
- Established: 1932
- President: Yuryi Fedorovich Gortyshov
- Rector: Kirill Germanovich Okhotkin
- Academic staff: 1,000
- Administrative staff: 2,000
- Students: 15,000
- Location: Kazan, Russia
- Campus: Urban. Also 11 branch institutes outside of the city.
- Alumni: Over 110,000 graduated students
- Website: http://www.kai.ru/

University rankings

Regional – Overall
- QS Emerging Europe and Central Asia: 168 (2022)

Kazan National Research Technical University named after A.N. Tupolev-KAI (KNRTU-KAI, full name in Russian: Казанский национальный исследовательский технический университет имени А. Н. Туполева-КАИ, or Kazan National Research Technical University named after A.N. Tupolev-KAI; Tatar: А.Н. Туполев исемендәге Казан илкүләм тикшеренү техник университеты, romanized: A.N. Tupolev isemendäge Qazan ilküläm tikşerenü texnik universitetı ) was established in 1932. Until recently, it was known as Kazan Aviation Institute (Казанский авиационный институт; Tatar: Казан авиация институты, romanized: Qazan aviatsiyä institutı). In 1973, the institute was named after Andrei Nikolayevich Tupolev, Russian and later Soviet aeronautical engineer and designer. In 1992, it got the status of State Technical University. In 2009, it got the status of National Research University. KNRTU-KAI teaches about 15,000 students on 65 majors in Engineering, Business, and Humanities by the university faculty body of 1,000 persons, including 150 Full Professors & Doctor of Science degree holders, 600 Associate Professors & Ph.D. degree holders.

== Education ==
The university includes the following institutes and faculties:

- Institute of Aviation, Land Transport & Power Engineerings
- Institute of Automation & Electronic Instrumentation
- Institute of Computer Technologies & Information Protection
- Institute of Radioelectronics, Photonics & Digital Technologies
- Institute of Engineering Economics & Entrepreneurship
- Faculty of Mathematics & Physics
- Higher School of Applied Information Technologies
- Higher School of Technology and Management
- Sino-Russian Engineering Institute
- Russian-Belarusian Institute of Advanced Technologies

KNRTU-KAI includes 4 associated branch institutes outside Kazan in the towns of Almetyevsk, Chistopol, Leninogorsk, Naberezhnye Chelny.

On September 2, 2014, German-Russian Institute of Advanced Technologies (GRIAT) opened as a result of cooperation between the KNRTU-KAI and two universities in Germany - The Technische Universität Ilmenau (TU Ilmenau) and the Otto von Guericke University Magdeburg in Magdeburg.

== Educational buildings ==
The university is housed in eight buildings. It has six student dormitories and a hostel. A sports complex includes five indoor sports halls. The university also has a sports camp near to the Volga river, 40 km from Kazan.

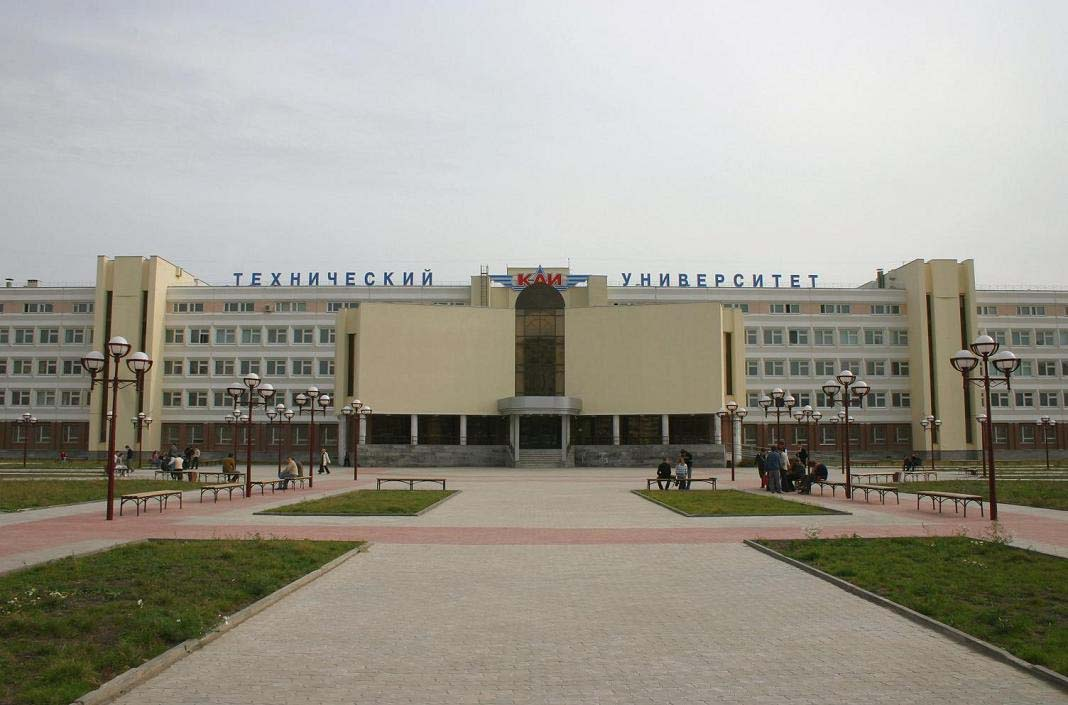
View to the entrance of the 2nd KAI building

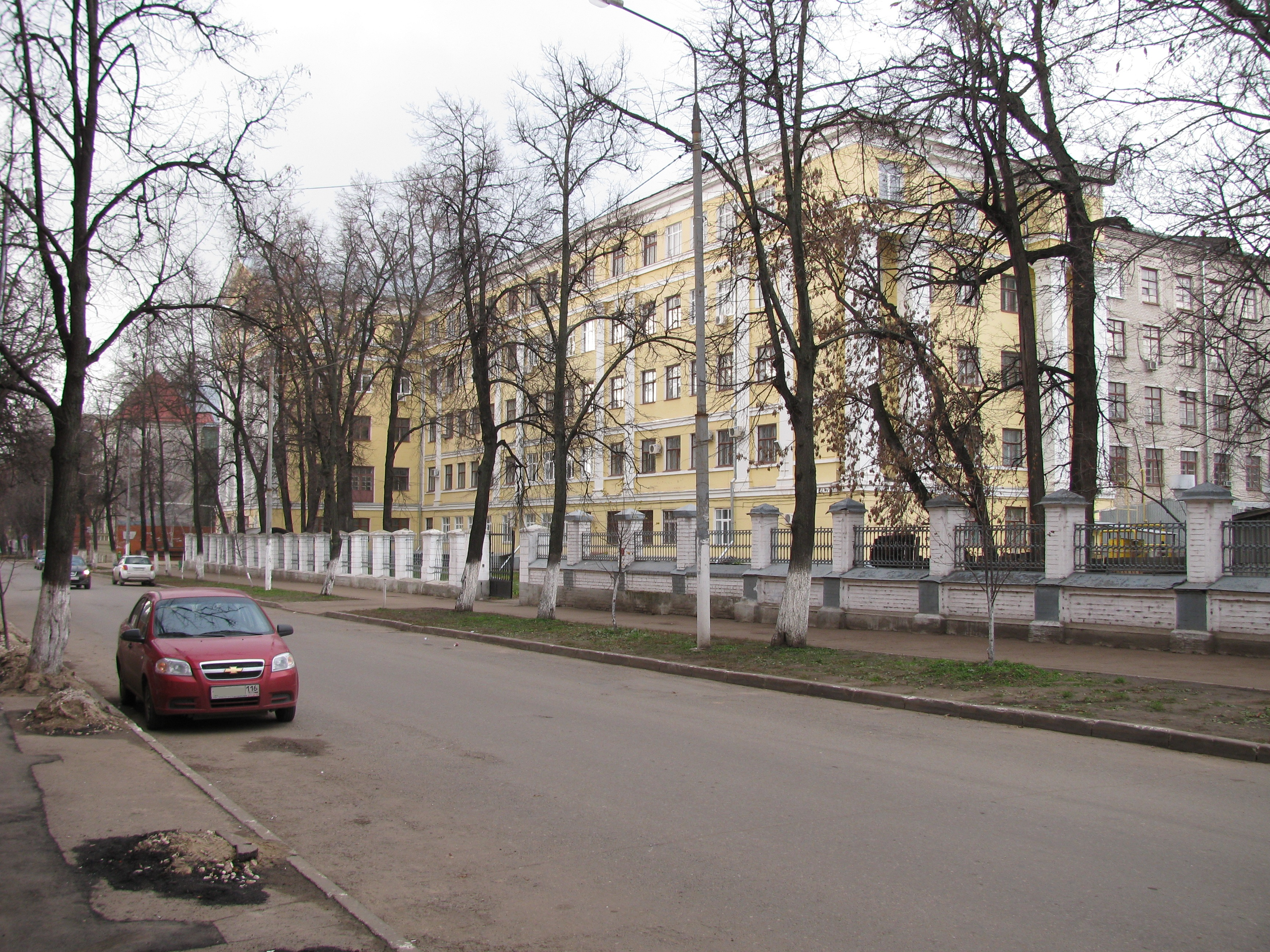
The 3rd KAI building

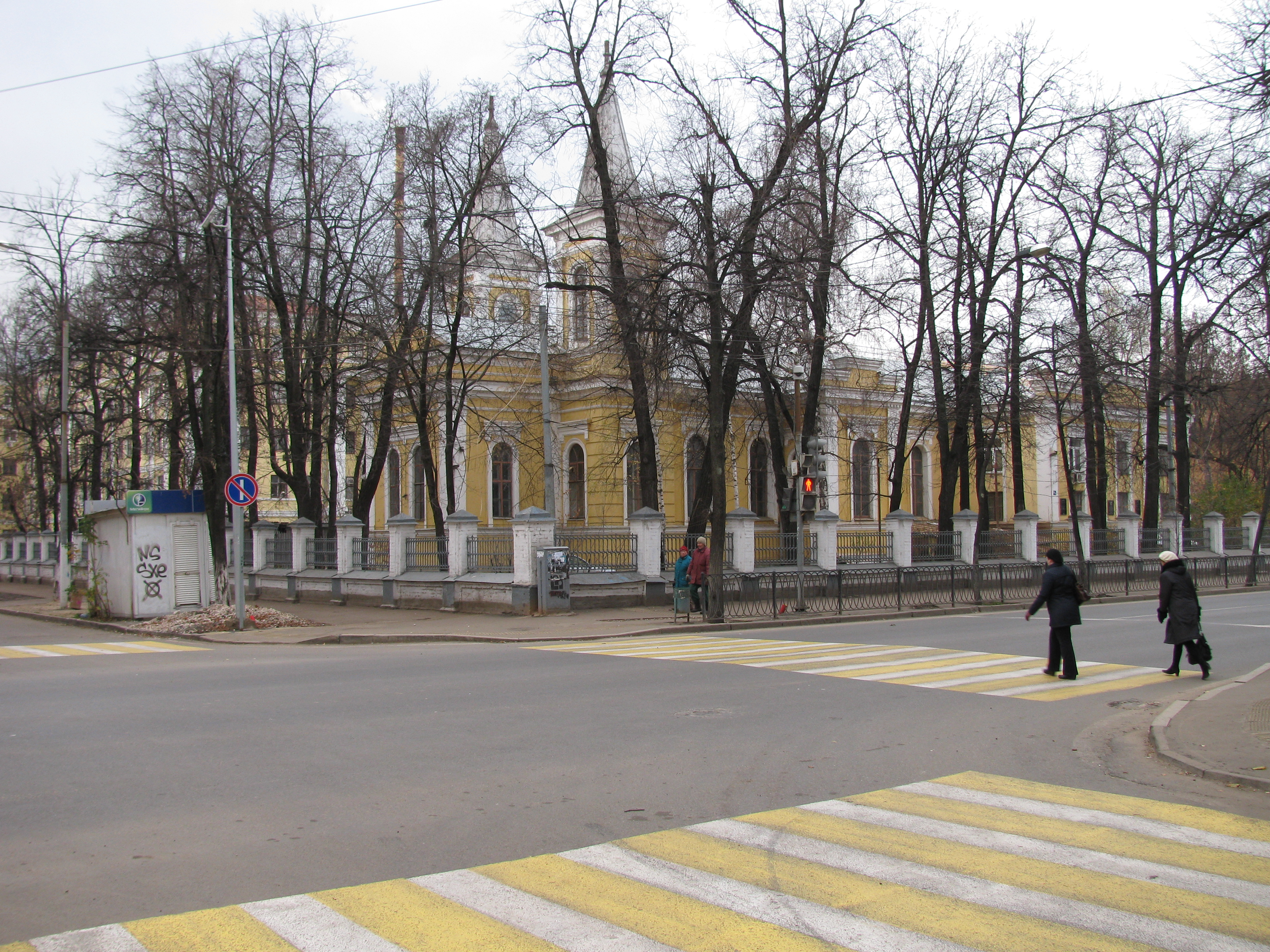
The 4th KAI building

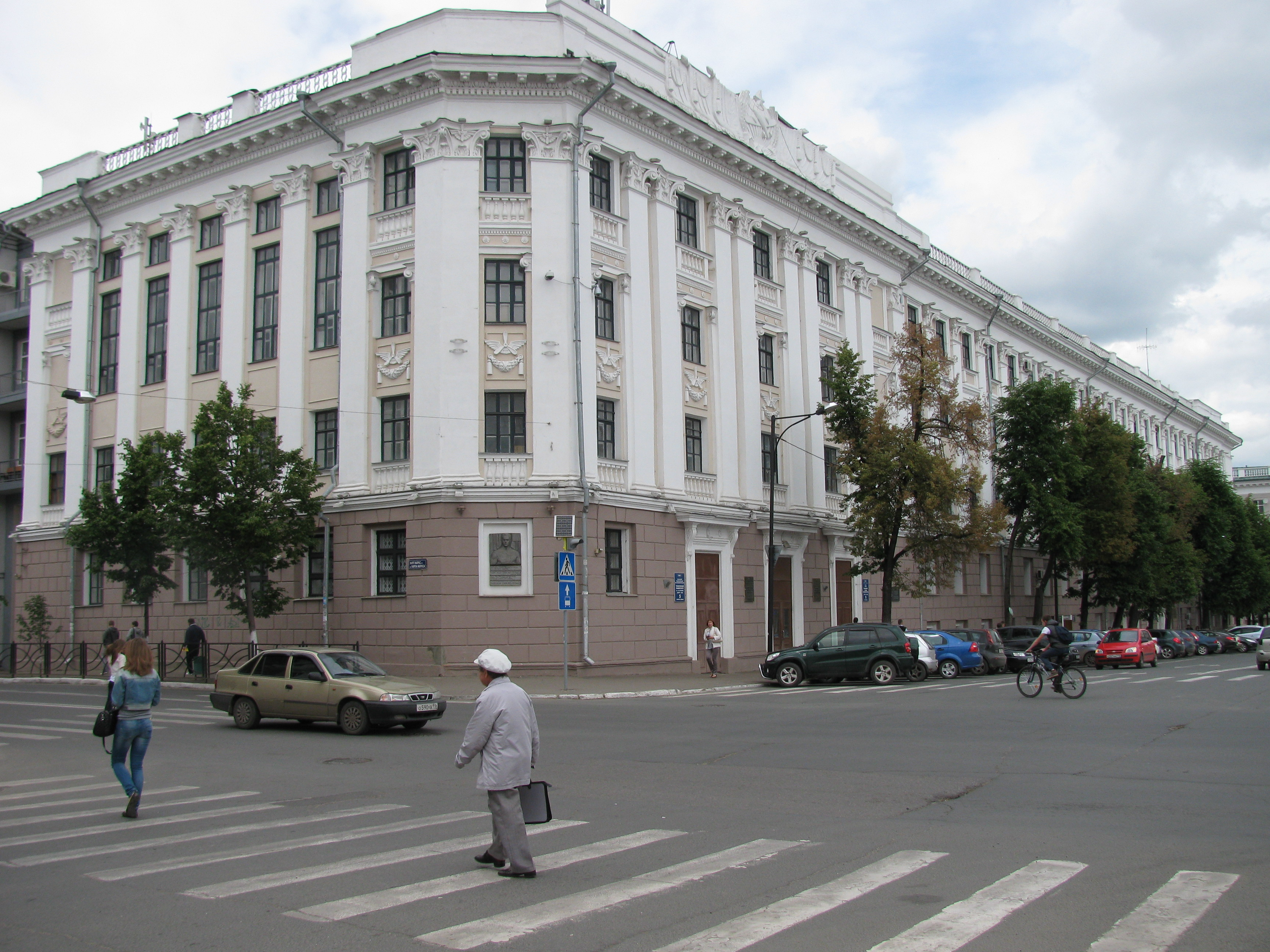
The 5th KAI building

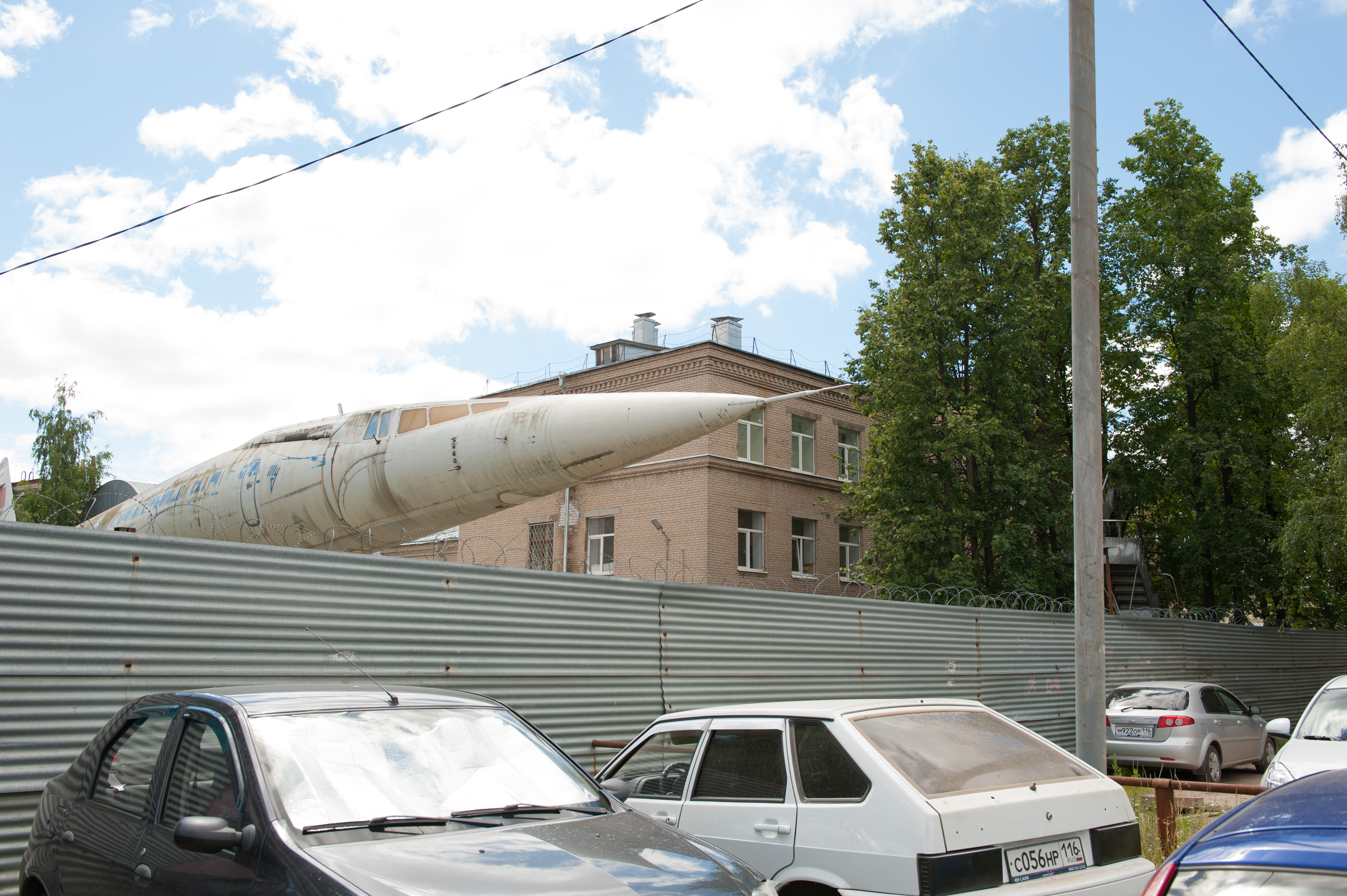
Tu-144 on the 6th KAI building campus

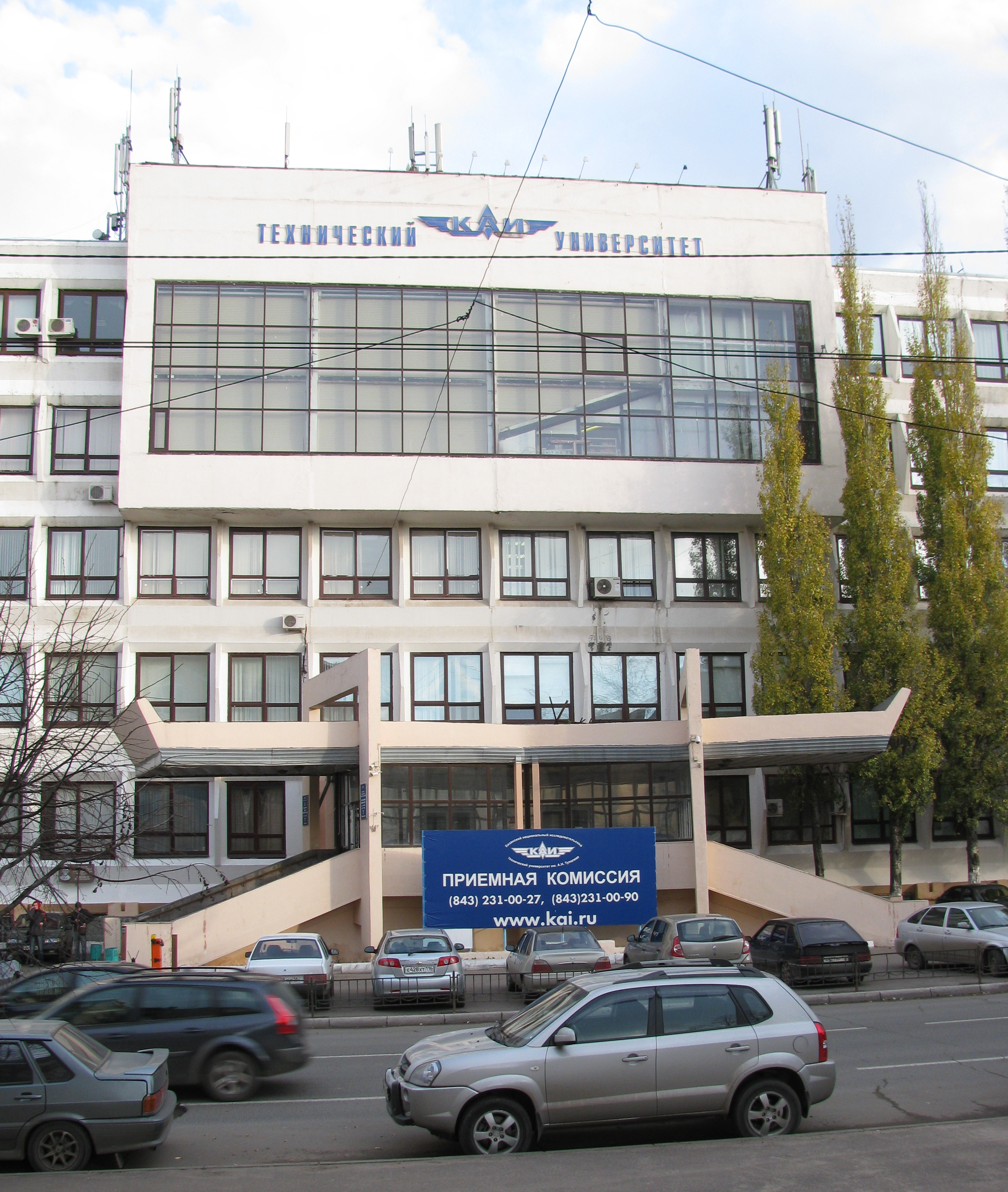
The main entrance to the 7th KAI building

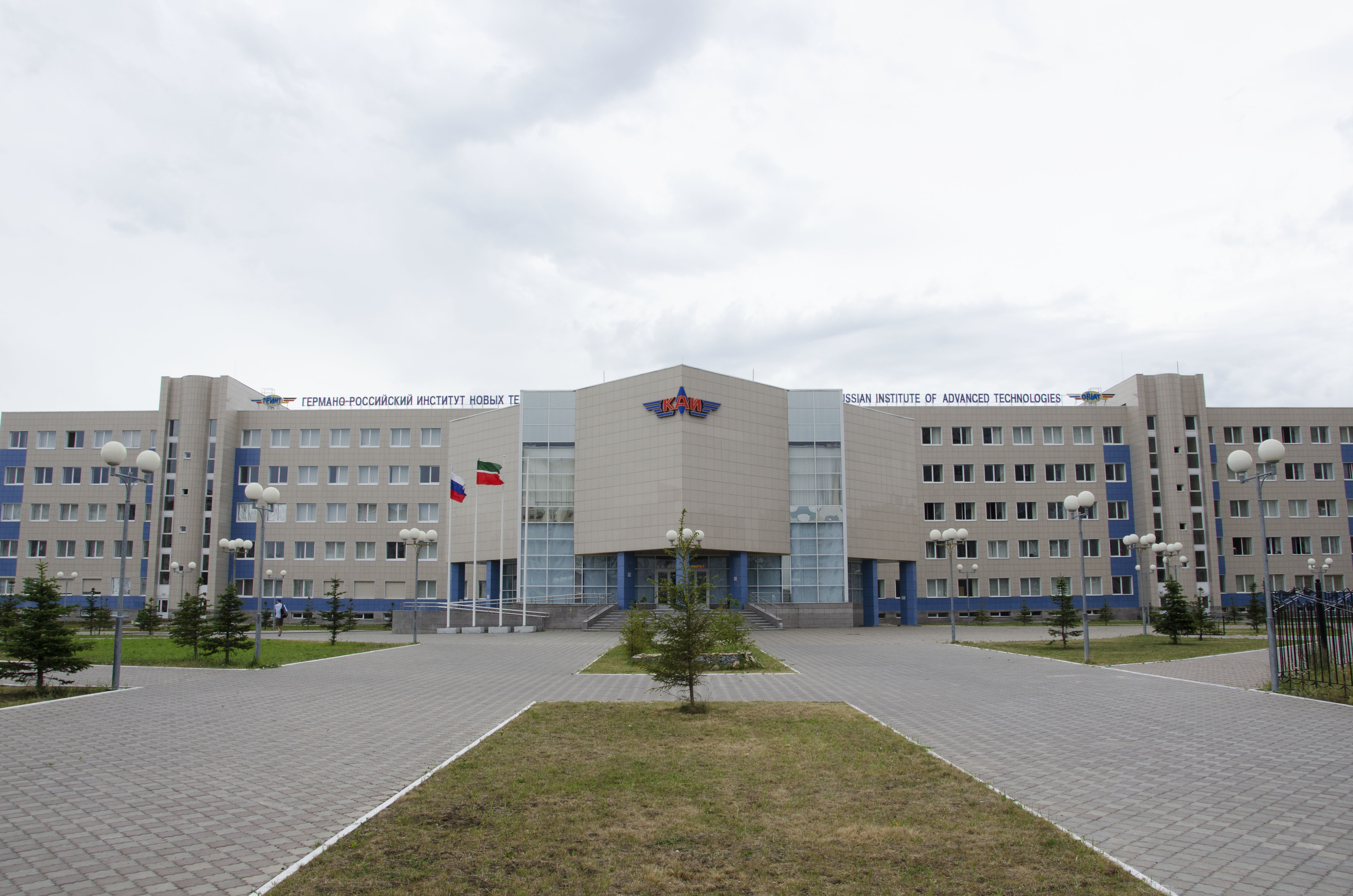
The 8th KAI building (German-Russian institute of advanced technologies)

== Activities ==
The sport complex includes 5 indoor sports halls.

== Notable alumni ==
- Mikhail Simonov (1929 – 2011), Russian aircraft designer
- Ivan Silayev (1930 – 2023), Soviet and Russian politician, Prime Minister of the Soviet Union in 1991
