= List of military aircraft of Japan =

This list of military aircraft of Japan includes project, prototype, pre-production, and operational types, regardless of era. This includes both domestically developed Japanese designs, licensed variants of foreign designs, and foreign-produced aircraft that served in the military of Japan. Japanese names are used here; World War II Allied reporting names are mentioned where available.

The prefix "Ki" in this list is an abbreviation of "Kitai", meaning "airframe", and was used only by the Imperial Japanese Army Air Force. "Ki" should be read as one word. For clarification on other designations, particularly those used by the Navy, see Japanese military aircraft designation systems. (Note: " - " indicates information is unknown or not applicable.)

== Pre-1945 ==
Type	Total	Date	Service	Class	Role	Notes
Aichi B7A Ryusei	114	1942	Navy	single-engine	carrier torpedo bomber	Allied reporting name Grace; retired 1945
Aichi D1A	590	1934	Navy	biplane	carrier dive bomber	Allied reporting name Susie; retired 1942
Aichi D3A	1,486	1938	Navy	monoplane	carrier dive bomber	Allied reporting name Val; many D3A1s & D3A2s operated as trainers by 1944; D3A2s used as kamikazes; retired 1945
Aichi E3A	12	1930	Navy	floatplane	shipboard reconnaissance	
Aichi E11A	17	1937	Navy	flying boat	night reconnaissance	Allied reporting name Laura; diverted to communications & transport duties; retired
Aichi E12A	2	1938	Navy	floatplane	shipboard reconnaissance	Experimental flying boat; preliminary stages of project took place 1937–38
Aichi E13A	1,418	1940	Navy	floatplane	shipboard reconnaissance	Allied reporting name Jake; long-range seaplane; used as anti-surface vessel aircraft (E13A1c), trainer (E13A1-K) & as kamikazes; retired 1945
Aichi E16A Zuiun	256	1942	Navy	floatplane	shipboard reconnaissance	Allied reporting name Paul; seaplane with secondary role as dive bomber (E16A1)
Aichi H9A	31	1940	Navy	flying boat	flying boat trainer	Retired 1945
Aichi Type 15-Ko Mi-go	4+	1925	Navy	floatplane	reconnaissance	Only prototypes built
Aichi M6A Seiran	28	1943	Navy	floatplane	submarine attack bomber	Submarine-launched attack floatplane; retired 1945
Aichi M6A1-K Nanzan	2	1945	Navy	landplane	bomber trainer	Prototype, land-based attack floatplane trainer version of Aichi M6A; retired 1945
Aichi Navy Type 2	2	1928	Navy	floatplane	shipboard reconnaissance	Heinkel HD 26 & Aichi-built prototypes; labeled obsolete after trials
Aichi S1A	2	n/a	Navy	twin-engine	night fighter	Prototypes destroyed, 1945; unflown
Army model 2 ground-taxiing trainer	97+	1919	Army	monoplane	primary trainer	Converted Nieuport 81; retired
Army Type Mo-4	84	1915	Army	biplane	trainer	
Army Type Mo-5	11	1919	Army	biplane	trainer	First Japanese purpose-built trainer
Avro 504K/L/S	310	1921	Navy	biplane	trainer	Retired 1934
Bréguet 19	3+	1925	Navy	sesquiplane	reconnaissance	Retired
Canadian Car & Foundry AXG1	1	1935	Navy	biplane	fighter	Purchased by Japan; retired
Curtiss-Wright LXC1	3	1936	Navy	amphibian	transport	All sold in Japan as Curtiss-Wright LXC
Dewoitine D.510J	2	1935	Navy	monoplane	fighter	Dewoitine D.500 built for Japanese evaluation, also called AXD1
Douglas DC-2	5	1936	Army	twin-engine	transport	Licence-built by Nakajima Aircraft Company; retired
Douglas HXD	1	1936	Navy	flying boat	transport	
Fairchild LXF1	2	1936	Navy	flying boat	transport	Sold to Japan & both wrecked, Japan 1937 & China 1939
Army Type Mo	30	1913	Army	biplane	reconnaissance	Retired 1922
Army Type Mo-4	84	1915	Army	biplane	reconnaissance	
Army Type Mo-6	134	1917	Army	biplane	reconnaissance	
Felixstowe F.5	110	1921	Navy	flying boat	maritime reconnaissance	Retired 1930
Fiat I-Type (BR.20)	85	1938	Army	twin-engine	heavy bomber	Allied reporting name Ruth; retired
Gasuden KR-2	1+	1934	Navy	biplane	transport	Unlicensed Japanese-built copy of the DH Fox Moth that was extensively redesigned
Gloster Sparrowhawk	90	1921	Navy	biplane	fighter	Retired 1928
Hansa-Brandenburg W.33	310	1922	Navy	floatplane	maritime reconnaissance	Retired 1928
Heinkel HD 23/Aichi Type H	4	1926	Navy	biplane	carrier fighter	
Heinkel A7He1	12	1938	Navy	monoplane	fighter	Allied reporting name Jerry; phased out of service after late 1941
Hiro G2H	8	1933	Navy	twin-engine	attack bomber	One aircraft lost in accident; five aircraft destroyed in a fire, 1937
Hiro H1H	65	1925	Navy	flying boat	maritime reconnaissance	Retired 1938
Hiro H2H	17	1932	Navy	flying boat	maritime reconnaissance	
Hiro H3H	1	1931	Navy	flying boat	maritime reconnaissance	H3H1 used as an engine test-bed, 1933
Hiro H4H	47	1933	Navy	flying boat	maritime reconnaissance	H4H1 & H4H2 remained in front-line service through the 1930s
Kayaba Ka-1/Ka-2 Ka-Go	98	1941	Army	autogyro	maritime reconnaissance	Based on Kellett KD-1; few Ka-1s used for liaison in Philippines, also used for artillery-spotting & anti-submarine warfare
Kawanishi E7K	533	1933	Navy	floatplane	shipboard reconnaissance	Allied reporting name Alf; used extensively from 1938 until the beginning of Pacific War, when E7K1s were relegated to second-line duties; E7K2 continued front-line service until retired, 1943; both versions used in kamikaze operations
Kawanishi E10K	1	1934	Navy	flying boat	transport	Entered service as Navy Type 94 Transport, but no further production
Kawanishi E11K	2	1937	Navy	flying boat	transport	Prototypes unsuitable for night reconnaissance & used as utility transports, Type 96 Transport
Kawanishi E13K	2	1938	Navy	floatplane	shipboard reconnaissance	Unsuccessful prototype
Kawanishi E15K Shiun	15	1941	Navy	floatplane	high speed reconnaissance	Allied reporting name Norm; production cancelled, 1944
Kawanishi H6K	217	1936	Navy	flying boat	maritime reconnaissance	Allied reporting name Mavis; also built as transports (H6K2-L, H6K3 Model 21 & H6K4-L); retired
Kawanishi H8K	131	1941	Navy	flying boat	maritime reconnaissance	Allied reporting name Emily; H8K2s used as patrol aircraft & transports (H8K2-L Type 2 Transport Flying Boat or Seikū & H8K4-L Provisional name Seikū); retired 1945
Kawanishi K6K	3	1938	Navy	biplane	seaplane trainer	Prototype not ordered into production
Kawanishi K8K	15	1938	Navy	biplane	seaplane trainer	
Kawanishi K-11	2	1927	Navy	biplane	carrier fighter	
Kawanishi N1K1 Kyofu	97	1942	Navy	floatplane	fighter	Allied reporting name Rex; used as trainers (N1K2-K Shiden Kai Rensen 1, Model A); retired 1945
Kawanishi N1K1-J/N1K2-J Shiden	1,422	1943	Navy	landplane	interceptor	Allied reporting name George - land-based version of Kawanishi N1K; used as fighter-bombers (N1K1-Jc Shiden Model 11C) & dive bombers (N1K1-J Kai b); retired 1945
Kawasaki Army Otsu 1	600+	1919	Army	biplane	reconnaissance	Licence-built Salmson 2 A.2
Kawasaki Army Type 88	1,117	1927	Army	biplane	reconnaissance	Retired 1940
Kawasaki Army Type 92	385	1929	Army	biplane	fighter	Served through at least 1941 as trainers
Kawasaki Ki-3	243	1933	Army	biplane	light bomber	
Kawasaki Ki-5	4	1934	Army	monoplane	fighter	Experimental project cancelled, 1934
Kawasaki Ki-10	588	1935	Army	biplane	fighter	Allied reporting name Perry; retired 1942
Kawasaki Ki-28	1	1936	Army	monoplane	fighter	Allied reporting name Bob; experimental aircraft flown in 1936 but never produced
Kawasaki Ki-32	854	1937	Army	monoplane	light bomber	Allied reporting name Mary; withdrawn from front-line service as trainers, 1942; retired 1945
Kawasaki Ki-45 Toryu	1,701	1939	Army	twin-engine	fighter	Allied reporting name Nick; some used as night fighters (Ki-45 KAId) & as kamikazes; retired 1945
Kawasaki Ki-48	1,677	1939	Army	twin-engine	light bomber	Allied reporting name Lily; used as dive bombers (Ki-48-IIb) & kamikazes (Ki-48-II KAI Kamikaze); retired 1945
Kawasaki Ki-56	121	1940	Army	twin-engine	transport	Allied reporting name Thalia; derived from the license-built Lockheed Model 14 Super Electra
Kawasaki Ki-60	3	1940	Army	monoplane	fighter	Experimental prototype with license-built liquid-cooled engine, cancelled late 1941
Kawasaki Ki-61 Hien	3,078	1941	Army	monoplane	fighter	Allied reporting name Tony; only mass-produced Japanese WWII fighter with liquid-cooled, inverted V engine; used as an interceptor (Ki-61-I-KAId) & as kamikazes; retired 1945
Kawasaki Ki-64	1	1943	Army	tandem-engine	fighter	Allied reporting name Rob; aircraft caught fire & was damaged during fifth flight; abandoned 1944
Kawasaki Ki-66	6	1942	Army	twin-engine	dive bomber	Prototypes only - first completed October 1942, last completed 1943; did not entered production; development terminated, 1944
Kawasaki Ki-78 Kensan III	1	1942	Army	single engine monoplane	High speed research	Partially-completed second prototype; project terminated, early 1944
Kawasaki Ki-88	0	n/a	Army	mid-engine	fighter	Cancelled circa 1942
Kawasaki Ki-91	0	1945	Army	four-engine	heavy bomber	First prototype 60% complete when air raid damaged facility where it was being built, bringing program to halt, 1945
Kawasaki Ki-96	3	1943	Army	twin-engine	fighter	Prototype originally designed as a two-seater; wings & tail unit of the eventual Ki-102
Kawasaki Ki-100	121	1945	Army	monoplane	fighter	Single-seat, single-engine monoplane Type 5 Fighter which were originally modified Kawasaki Ki-61 II KAIs (Ki-100-I-Ko); three high-altitude prototypes (Ki-100-II) were never used operationally; retired 1945
Kawasaki Ki-102	238	1944	Army	twin-engine	heavy fighter	Allied reporting name Randy; used as ground-attack aircraft (Ki-102 Otsu) & night fighters (Ki-102 Hei); retired 1945
Kawasaki Ki-108	4	1944	Army	twin-engine	high-altitude fighter	Ki-102 derivative - high-altitude fighter prototype; retired 1945
Kawasaki Ki-119	0	n/a	Army	single-engine	bomber	Prototype drawings destroyed in American air attacks, 1945; first prototype not completed before Japanese surrender
Kokusai Ki-59	59	1939	Army	twin-engine	transport	Allied reporting name Theresa
Kokusai Ki-76	1+	1941	Army	single-engine	command liaison	Allied reporting name Stella; also used as anti-submarine & artillery spotter aircraft; retired 1945
Kokusai Ki-86	1,037	1944	Army	biplane	primary trainer	License-built Bücker Bü 131 Jungmann; retired
Kokusai Ki-105 Ohtori	9	1945	Army	twin-engine	transport	Powered Ku-7 intended for use as long-range, fuel tanker aircraft, development priorities shifted elsewhere
Kokusai Ku-7 Manazuru	2	1945	Army	glider	transport	Allied reporting name Buzzard; experimental, twin-boom military glider
Kokusai Ku-8	700 ca.	1941	Army	glider	transport	Allied reporting names Goose & Gander; unpowered Kokusai Ki-59 used in Philippines, primarily to carry supplies
Koshiki-2 Experimental Fighter	2	1922	Army	biplane	fighter	First Japanese-designed fighter
Kyushu J7W Shinden	2	1945	Navy	canard	interceptor	Prototype, propeller-driven plane with wings at the rear of the fuselage, a nose-mounted canard & a pusher engine, flown three times before the end of the War; abandoned
Kyushu K9W1 Momiji	339	1942	Navy	biplane	primary trainer	License-built Bücker Bü 131 Jungmann; retired
Kyushu K10W1	176	1943	Navy	monoplane	intermediate trainer	Allied reporting name Oak; small number used as target tugs
Kyushu K11W Shiragiku	798	1942	Navy	monoplane	operations trainer	Used as trainer for bombing, navigation & communications (K11W1), anti-submarine patrol (Q3W1 Nankai) & transport aircraft (K11W2) and as kamikazes
Kyushu Q1W Tokai	153	1943	Navy	twin-engine	maritime reconnaissance	Allied reporting name Lorna; anti-submarine patrol bomber that was also used as a prototype trainer (Q1W1-K Tokai-Ren); retired 1945
Mansyu Ki-79	1,329	1936	Army	monoplane	advanced trainer	Allied reporting name Nate; based on Ki-27, Mansyū Army Type 2 was an advanced trainer & some used as kamikazes; retired 1945
Mansyū Ki-98	0	n/a	Army	pusher	light bomber	Prototype destroyed to avoid capture, 1945
Mitsubishi 1MF	138	1921	Navy	biplane	carrier fighter	Retired 1930
Mitsubishi 1MT	20	1922	Navy	triplane	carrier torpedo bomber	Withdrawn & scrapped
Mitsubishi 2MR8 Type 92	130	1932	Army	parasol monoplane	reconnaissance	Retired 1936
Mitsubishi A5M	1,094	1935	Navy	monoplane	carrier fighter	Allied reporting name Claude; used as trainers (A5M4-K), most remaining airframes used as kamikazes; retired 1945
Mitsubishi A6M Reisen	10,939	1939	Navy	monoplane	carrier fighter	Allied reporting name Zeke or "Zero"; used as kamikazes (A6M5c & A6M7); retired 1945
Mitsubishi A7M Reppu	9	1944	Navy	monoplane	carrier fighter	Allied reporting name Sam; never entered mass production or active duty; retired 1945
Mitsubishi B1M	443	1923	Navy	biplane	carrier torpedo bomber	Used as experimental reconnaissance seaplane (2MT4 Ohtori); surplus B1Ms converted for civilian use (T-1.2), 1929
Mitsubishi B2M	206	1932	Navy	biplane	carrier torpedo bomber	
Mitsubishi B5M	125	1936	Navy	monoplane	attack bomber	Allied reporting name Mabel; some used as trainers, target tugs & kamikazes
Mitsubishi C1M	159	1932	Navy	biplane	shipboard reconnaissance	Used as intermediate trainers until late-1930s (2MRT1, 2MRT1A, 2MRT2, 2MRT2A, 2MRT3 & 2MRT3A); many converted to civil use (R-1.2 Trainer, R-2.2 Trainer & Mitsubishi R-4), some remained in civilian service until 1938
Mitsubishi F1M	1,118	1936	Navy	floatplane	shipboard reconnaissance	Allied reporting name Pete; retired
Mitsubishi G3M/L3Y	1,048	1934	Navy	twin-engine	attack bomber	Allied reporting name Nell; transport variants built as L3Y1 & L3Y2 or G3M1-L (armed or unarmed transport); retired 1945
Mitsubishi G4M	2,435	1939	Navy	twin-engine	attack bomber	Allied reporting name Betty; retired 1945
Mitsubishi G6M	30	1940	Navy	twin-engine	convoy fighter	Allied reporting name Betty; some G6M1s built as transports (G6M1-L2) or trainers (G6M1-K); retired 1945
Mitsubishi J2M Raiden	621	1942	Navy	monoplane	interceptor	Allied reporting name Jack; retired 1945
Mitsubishi J8M Shusui	5?	1945	Navy	rocket	interceptor	Originally to be a licence-built Messerschmitt Me 163 Komet but had to be designed almost from scratch & developed in parallel with Yokosuka MXY8 trainer; single prototype flight-tested once & crashed before end of WWII
Mitsubishi K3M/Ki-7	625	1930	Navy	monoplane	crew trainer	Allied reporting name Pine; some built as transports - Mitsubishi K3M3-L (military version) & Mitsubishi MS-1 (civil version)
Mitsubishi 己 1 (Ka-1)/Hanriot HD.14	146+	1924	Army	biplane	primary trainer	Built under licence by Mitsubishi
Mitsubishi Ki-1	219	1933	Army	twin-engine	heavy bomber	Replaced, 1937
Mitsubishi Ki-2	187	1933	Army	twin-engine	light bomber	Allied reporting name Louise; replaced by the late 1930s & used as trainers; one built as a de-militarized, long-range record-breaking aircraft (Mitsubishi Ohtori) - mistakenly given Allied reporting name Eva or Eve
Mitsubishi Ki-15/C5M	500 ca.	1936	Army	single-engine	reconnaissance	Allied reporting name Babs; Karigane I (prototype version for civilian use) & some used as kamikazes; retired 1945
Mitsubishi Ki-20	6	1931	Army	twin-engine	heavy bomber	All aircraft either destroyed during WWII or scrapped in the latter portion of the 1940s
Mitsubishi Ki-21	2,064	1936	Army	twin-engine	heavy bomber	Allied reporting names Sally/Gwen; retired 1945
Mitsubishi Ki-30	686	1937	Army	single-engine	light bomber	Allied reporting name Ann; most relegated to trainers by end of 1942; many used as kamikazes
Mitsubishi Ki-46	1,742	1939	Army	twin-engine	reconnaissance	Allied reporting name Dinah; retired 1945
Mitsubishi Ki-51	1,472	1939	Army	single-engine	assault bomber	Allied reporting name Sonia; used for reconnaissance (Ki-51A) & as kamikazes
Mitsubishi Ki-57/L4M/MC-20	406	1939	Army/Navy	twin-engine	transport	Allied reporting name Topsy
Mitsubishi Ki-67 Hiryu	606	1942	Army	twin-engine	heavy bomber	Allied reporting name Peggy; used for level & torpedo bombing, early warning radar (Ki-67-I), experimental "guided missile mother ship", glider tug & as kamikazes (Ki-167 "Sakura-dan"); retired 1945
Mitsubishi Ki-83	4	1944	Army	twin-engine	escort fighter	Experimental, long-range heavy fighter prototype that did not reach production status
Mitsubishi Ki-109	22	1944	Army	twin-engine	interceptor	Version of Ki-67 originally designed as night fighter but used as heavy fighter; retired 1945
Mitsubishi Ki-200 Shusui	2?	1945	Army	rocket	interceptor	Aircraft closely based on the Messerschmitt Me 163 Komet & very similar to the J8M1
Mitsubishi Ko-1	57	1915	Army	sesquiplane	trainer	License-built Nieuport 81 E.2s; retired
Nakajima A1N	151	1927	Navy	biplane	carrier fighter	Retired 1935
Nakajima A2N	166	1929	Navy	biplane	carrier fighter	
Nakajima A4N	221	1935	Navy	biplane	carrier fighter	
Nakajima A6M2-N	327	1942	Navy	floatplane	fighter	Allied reporting name Rufe; seaplane also used as interceptor, fighter-bomber & short reconnaissance support for amphibious landings
Nakajima Army Type 91	450	1927	Army	monoplane	fighter	Retired 1937
Nakajima B5N	1,150 ca.	1937	Navy	monoplane	carrier torpedo bomber	Allied reporting name Kate; many B5N1s converted to advanced trainers (B5N1-K); used as kamikazes; retired 1945
Nakajima B-6	2	1919	Army	biplane	bomber	Licence-built Breguet 14 B.2; retired
Nakajima B6N Tenzan	1,268	1941	Navy	single-engine	carrier torpedo bomber	Allied reporting name Jill; used as kamikazes; retired 1945
Nakajima C3N	2	1936	Navy	single-engine	shipboard reconnaissance	
Nakajima C6N Saiun	463	1943	Navy	single-engine	shipboard reconnaissance	Allied reporting name Myrt; used as night fighters (C6N1 Saiun Model 11); retired 1945
Nakajima E2N	80	1929	Navy	floatplane	shipboard reconnaissance	Withdrawn from front-line units in the 1930s & either reassigned to training duties (E2N2) or sold to civil buyers
Nakajima E4N	171	1930	Navy	floatplane	shipboard reconnaissance	Nine E4N2-Cs were converted to P1 mail planes, 1933
Nakajima E8N	753	1934	Navy	floatplane	shipboard reconnaissance	Allied reporting name Dave
Nakajima E12N	2	1938	Navy	floatplane	shipboard reconnaissance	Experimental seaplane prototypes; work suspended 1939
Nakajima G5N Shinzan	6	1941	Navy	four-engine	heavy bomber	Allied reporting name Liz; Experimental plane also used as (4) long-range transports (G5N2-L Shinzan-Kai Freighter); retired 1945
Nakajima G8N Renzan	4	1944	Navy	four-engine	heavy bomber	Allied reporting name Rita; third prototype destroyed on ground; project cancelled & aircraft retired, 1945
Nakajima J1N Gekko	429	1941	Navy	twin-engine	night fighter	Allied reporting name Irving; also used for long-range reconnaissance (J1N1-C & J1N1-R) & observation (J1N1-F); retired 1945
Nakajima J5N Tenrai	6	1944	Navy	twin-engine	interceptor	Experimental
Nakajima Kikka	1	1945	Navy	jet	interceptor	Prototype of Japan's first turbojet-powered aircraft which flew successfully once before the end of WWII, damaged during second test flight
Nakajima Ki-4	518	1934	Army	biplane	direct co-operation	Retired 1943
Nakajima Ki-6/C2N	47+	1930	Army/Navy	single-engine	transport/trainer	
Nakajima Ki-19	4	1937	Army	twin-engine	heavy bomber	Unsuccessful prototypes; one converted to N-19 mail plane, 1939
Nakajima Ki-27	3,368	1936	Army	monoplane	fighter	Allied reporting name Nate; used as trainers (Ki-27a-Kai & Ki-27b-Kai) & some used as kamikazes; retired 1945
Nakajima Ki-34/L1N	318	1936	Army/Navy	twin-engine	transport	Allied reporting name Thora
Nakajima Ki-43 Hayabusa	5,919	1939	Army	monoplane	fighter	Allied reporting name Oscar; later examples of Ki-43-II-KAI could carry bombs on drop tank mountings, proposed as an interceptor (Ki-62 Project) & many used as kamikazes; retired 1945
Nakajima Ki-44 Shoki	1,225	1940	Army	monoplane	fighter	Allied reporting name Tojo; retired 1945
Nakajima Ki-49 Donryu	763	1939	Army	twin-engine	heavy bomber	Allied reporting name Helen; used as escort fighters (Nakajima Ki-58), troop transports, specialized pathfinder aircraft (Ki-80, employed as engine test-beds), in anti-submarine patrols & as kamikazes; retired 1945
Nakajima Ki-58	3	1940	Army	twin-engine	escort fighter	Prototype version of Nakajima Ki-49
Nakajima Ki-84 Hayate	3,514	1943	Army	monoplane	fighter	Allied reporting name Frank; used as night fighters (Ki-84-I Tei); retired 1945
Nakajima Ki-87	1	1945	Army	monoplane	high-altitude fighter	Prototype, high-altitude fighter-interceptor whose construction was delayed due to problems with design & only flew 5 test flights
Nakajima Ki-115 Tsurugi	105	1945	Army	single-engine	attack bomber	One-man kamikaze aircraft (Tōka) - none used in combat; retired 1945
Nakajima Ko-2	40	1914	Army	sesquiplane	trainer	License-built Nieuport 83 E.2; retired
Nakajima Ko-3	102	1917	Army	sesquiplane	fighter	License-built Nieuport 24/27 - also used as a trainer; retired 1926
Nakajima Ko-4	608	1918	Army	biplane	fighter	Licence-built Nieuport-Delage NiD 29; retired 1937
Nakajima LXD-1	1	1939	Navy	four-engine	transport	Experimental airliner Douglas DC-4E sold to Japan for reverse-engineering
Nakajima Type 5	101+	1919	Army	biplane	trainer	First civilian-built, military standard aeroplane made in Japan
Nieuport NG & NM (IV.G & IV.M)	2	1913	Army	monoplane	reconnaissance	Retired
Nihon L7P	1	1942	Navy	amphibian	transport	Developed using the hull of the Fairchild XA-942B, second prototype remained unfinished & was scrapped
Nippi K8Ni1	2	1938	Navy	floatplane	primary trainer	
Rikugun Ki-93	1	1945	Army	twin-engine	fighter	Prototype damaged on maiden short flight & destroyed in bombing the night before scheduled second test flight
Seversky A8V	20	1938	Navy	monoplane	reconnaissance	Allied reporting name Dick; 2PA-B3s sold to Japan as A8V1 or Navy Type S Two-Seat Fighter; retired
Nakajima/Showa L2D	487	1939	Navy	twin-engine	transport	Allied reporting name Tabby; license-built version of Douglas DC-3 (LXD1)
Sopwith 1½ Strutter	7+	1915	Army	biplane	reconnaissance	
Sopwith Pup	50	1919	Navy	biplane	advanced trainer	Retired
SPAD S.XIII Hei 1	100	1919	Army	biplane	fighter	Retired 1922
Tachikawa Ki-9	2,618	1935	Army	biplane	intermediate trainer	Allied reporting name Spruce; some used as kamikazes; retired 1951
Tachikawa Ki-17	560	1935	Army	biplane	primary trainer	Allied reporting name Cedar
Tachikawa Ki-36	1,334	1938	Army	single-engine	direct co-operation	Allied reporting name Ida; used as advanced trainers (Tachikawa Ki-55) & as kamikazes
Tachikawa Ki-54	1,368	1940	Army	twin engine	crew trainer	Allied reporting name Hickory; also used as light transport, communications aircraft (both Ki-54c, civil designation Y-59) & maritime reconnaissance (Ki-54d) retired 1945
Tachikawa Ki-55	1,389	1939	Army	monoplane	advanced trainer	Allied reporting name Ida; retired 1945
Tachikawa Ki-70	3	1943	Army	twin-engine	reconnaissance	Allied reporting name Clara - high speed, photo reconnaissance aircraft prototype that never entered production & was terminated
Tachikawa Ki-74	16	1944	Army	twin-engine	reconnaissance bomber	Allied reporting name Patsy, originally Pat; experimental, long-range reconnaissance bomber that did not progress beyond developmental testing
Tachikawa Ki-77	2	1942	Army	twin-engine	transport	Very long-range experimental transport & communications aircraft; retired 1945
Tachikawa Ki-94-I	0	1945	Army	push-pull	high-altitude fighter	Single-seat, fighter-interceptor aircraft project that did not advance beyond the mock-up stage due to being judged "unduly optimistic"
Tachikawa Ki-94-II	1	1945	Army	single-engine	high-altitude fighter	Prototype single-seat, fighter-interceptor aircraft that was never finished before the end of WWII
Tachikawa KKY	23	1935	Army	biplane	ambulance	Funded by private donations
Tachikawa SS-1	2	1943	Army	twin engine monoplane	High altitude research	Version of Lockheed Model 14 Super Electra, Tachikawa incorporated a pressurised cabin into new forward & centre fuselage sections for a locally-built Lockheed Type LO Transport Aircraft, resulting in a research aircraft (Tachikawa-Lockheed Type-B high altitude research aircraft), which carried out a brief flight testing programme
Tokyo Koku Ki-107	29	1944	Army	monoplane	primary trainer	
Watanabe E9W	35	1938	Navy	floatplane	shipboard reconnaissance	Allied reporting name Slim; retired 1942
Watanabe K6W	3	1937	Navy	biplane	seaplane trainer	Experimental
Watanabe K8W	3	1938	Navy	biplane	seaplane trainer	Unsuccessful prototype that never entered production
Yokosuka B4Y	205	1935	Navy	biplane	carrier torpedo bomber	Allied reporting name Jean; retired 1943
Yokosuka D3Y1-K Myojo	5	1945	Navy	monoplane	bomber trainer	Two-seat dive bomber/trainer, derived from the Aichi D3A, made nearly entirely of wood; cancelled after 2 prototypes & 3 plane production run
Yokosuka D4Y Suisei	2,038	1940	Navy	single-engine	carrier dive bomber	Allied reporting name Judy, some built for reconnaissance (D4Y1-C, D4Y2-R & D4Y2a-R), night fighter use (D4Y2-S & D4Y3), land-based bombers (D4Y3) or kamikazes (D4Y4 Special Strike Bomber); retired 1945
Yokosuka E1Y	320	1926	Navy	floatplane	shipboard reconnaissance	Retired 1932; many sold as civil aircraft (Navy Type 14 Modified Transport Seaplane)
Yokosuka E5Y	20	1930	Navy	floatplane	shipboard reconnaissance	
Yokosuka E6Y	10	1932	Navy	floatplane	submarine reconnaissance	Retired 1943
Yokosuka E14Y	126	1939	Navy	floatplane	submarine reconnaissance	Allied reporting name Glen; retired 1943
Yokosuka H5Y	20	1936	Navy	flying boat	maritime reconnaissance	Allied reporting name Cherry
Yokosuka I-go Ko-gata	70	1920	Navy	biplane	primary seaplane trainer	
Yokosuka K1Y	104	1925	Navy	biplane	primary seaplane trainer	
Yokosuka K2Y	464	1929	Navy	biplane	primary trainer	Versions of the Avro 504N & K2Y1; retired 1934
Yokosuka K4Y	211	1930	Navy	biplane	seaplane trainer	A few aircraft released for civilian use
Yokosuka K5Y	5,770	1933	Navy	biplane	intermediate trainer	Allied reporting name Willow
Yokosuka MXY-7 Ohka	850	1944	Navy	rocket	assault bomber	Allied personnel referred to aircraft as "Baka Bombs"; purpose-built, rocket-powered (originally unpowered) human-guided, kamikaze attack-aircraft; used as trainers (Ohka Model 43 K-1 Kai Wakazakura) & interceptors ("Suzuka-24"); retired 1945
Yokosuka MXY8 Akigusa	50-60	1945	Navy	glider	glider trainer	Used as pilot training for Mitsubishi J8M - Army designation Ku-13
Yokosuka P1Y Ginga	1,002	1943	Navy	twin-engine	attack bomber	Allied reporting name Frances; used as night fighters (P1Y1 Ginga Model 11, P1Y2-S & P1Y2 Ginga Model 16), ground attack aircraft (P1Y1) & as non-flying ground decoys (MXY10 Yokosuka Navy Bomber Ginga); retired 1945
Yokosuka R2Y Keiun	1	1945	Navy	single-engine	reconnaissance	Prototype which made a short flight but then was destroyed in air raid a few days later, ending development
Yokosuka Ro-go Ko-gata	218	1918	Navy	floatplane	reconnaissance	Retired 1928

== Post-1945 ==
Type	Origin	Role	Adopted	Status	Total	Notes
Aeronca L-16	US	utility	1952	retired 1953	20	militarized version of Aeronca Champion used as liaison aircraft
AgustaWestland MCH-101	Italy/UK	multi-role	2007	in use	12	License-built minesweeper/transport helicopter - at least one more on order, replaces MH-53E
Beechcraft King Air UC-90	US	reconnaissance	1974	retired 2010	1	photo survey
Beechcraft King Air LC-90	US	utility	1974	in use	5	liaison
Beechcraft 18	US	trainer	1957	retired 1965	35	including at least one SNB trainer; JA5174 (H18 - final Beech 18 produced) preserved at Miyazaki Aviation College
Beechcraft TC-90	US	multi-engine trainer	1974	in use	12	2 transferred to Philippines in 2017 with 3 more to be transferred
Beechcraft LR-2	US	utility	1998	in use	8	used for reconnaissance & communications
Beechcraft Queen Air Umibato	US	navigation trainer	1963	retired 2000	28	liaison
Raytheon T-1 Jayhawk	US	crew trainer	1994	in use	13	T-400 military version of Model 400A
Bell AH-1S Cobra	US	attack helicopter	1984	in use	48	license-built by Fuji Heavy Industries for JGSDF; planned to be retired
Bell H-13/47	US	utility	1953	retired 1998	127	helicopter
Bell UH-1J	US	utility	1993	in use	115	license-built, improved version of UH-1H helicopter by Fuji Heavy Industries - to be replaced by Subaru-Bell UH-2; some in donated to Philippine Army
Boeing AH-64DJP	US	attack helicopter	2007	in use	12	planned to be retired
Boeing 747-47C	US	transport	1993	retired 2019	2	VIP transport - former Japanese Air Force One
Boeing E-767	US	AEW	2000	in use	4	Boeing 767-200 with a Boeing E-3 Sentry radar installed
Boeing KC-767J	US	tanker	2009	in use	4	developed from Boeing 767-200ER for aerial refueling
Boeing CH-47J/CH-47JA	US	utility	1985	in use	67	license-built (Kawasaki) transport & SAR helicopter used by JASDF & JGSDF
British Aerospace U–125	UK	utility	1992	in use	28	based on Hawker 800, used for flight inspection (U-125) and search & rescue (U-125A) - planned to be retired
Cessna U206G Stationair	US	utility	1977	retired 1997	1	
Cessna L-19 Bird Dog	US	utility	1954	retired 1994	129	60 license-built liaison & observation aircraft by Fuji
Curtiss C-46 Commando	US	transport	1954	retired 1978	48	including at least one C-46A
Douglas R4D Dakota "Manazuru"	US	transport	1958	retired 1972	4	JMSDF received two R4D-6s, one R4D-7 (trainer) & one R4D-6Q from USA
Eurocopter TH-135	Multinational	trainer	2009	in use	15	helicopter trainer
Fuji LM-1 Nikko	Japan	communications	1955	retired 1983	27	light communications aircraft developed from T-34, also used as liaison; several sold to U.S. civil market as warbirds
Fuji LM-2/KM-2/TL-1	Japan	trainer	1962	retired 1998	66	developed from Beechcraft T-34 Mentor, also used as liaison aircraft
Fuji T-1 Hatsutaka	Japan	advanced trainer	1960	retired 2006	66	Japan's first indigenously-designed, mass-produced, post-WWII jet aircraft - replaced by Kawasaki T-4
Fuji T-3 (KM-2B)	Japan	trainer	1978	retired 2007	50	developed from Fuji KM-2 - replaced by Fuji T-7
Fuji T-5 (KM-2D & KM-2Kai)	Japan	trainer	1988	in use	32	replacement for Fuji KM-2
Fuji T-7 (T-3 Kai)	Japan	trainer	2002	in use	49	developed from & replaced Fuji T-3
Fuji TACOM	Japan	UAV	1995	retired 2011	6	
Subaru-Bell UH-2 (UH-X)	Japan	utility	2022	in use	6	helicopter to replace UH-1J - more on order
Grumman Albatross Harigane UF-2S	US	multi-role	1961	retired 1976	6	amphibian flying boat - one converted for research (UF-XS)
Grumman Goose	US	utility	1955	retired 1961	4	amphibian flying boat (including at least one JRF-5)
Grumman E-2C/D	US	AEW	1987	in use	18	more on order
Grumman S2F-1 Aotaka	US	maritime patrol	1957	retired 1984	60	six S2F-1s reconfigured into four S2F-U (utility) & two S2F-C; replaced by Lockheed P-3 Orion
Grumman TBM-3 Avenger	US	multi-role	1954	retired 1961	20	including at least several TBM-3W (airborne early warning control & relay)
Gulfstream U-4	US	flight inspection	1997	in use	5	
Hughes OH-6 Cayuse	US	reconnaissance	1969	retired?	332	license-built helicopter by Kawasaki Heavy Industries (OH-6J)
Hughes TH-55J	US	trainer	1971	retired 1995	38	license-produced version of TH-55A helicopter by Kawasaki
Kawasaki C-1	Japan	transport	1973	in use	5	third, indigenous, post-WWII aircraft programme in Japan, also used for electronic warfare (EC-1) - replaced C-46
Kawasaki C-2	Japan	transport	2016	in use	14	also used for reconnaissance (RC-2), more on order - replacing C–1 & C–130H
Kawasaki KH-4	Japan	utility	1965	retired?	20+?	helicopter developed or modified from Bell 47G
Kawasaki-Vertol KV-107II	Japan	utility	1966	retired 2009	123	helicopter built or assembled by Kawasaki Heavy Industries - used for transport (KV-107II-1/KV-107II-4A/KV-107IIA-4/KV-107II-7), minesweeping (KV-107II-3/KV-107IIA-3), assault helicopters (KV-107II-4) & long-range SAR (KV-107II-5/KV-107IIA-5)
Kawasaki KAL-2	Japan	liaison	1954	retired 1964	2	prototypes - one with JASDF & one with JMSDF; KAL-2 serial 20001 on display at Tokorozawa Aviation Museum
Kawasaki OH-1 Ninja	Japan	reconnaissance	1997	in use	37	first helicopter entirely produced in Japan; scout helicopter that replaced the OH-6D - planned to be retired
Kawasaki P-1	Japan	maritime patrol	2013	in use	33	Successor to the P-3 Orion, more on order
Kawasaki P-2J (P2V-Kai)	Japan	maritime patrol	1966	retired 1996	82	license-built Lockheed P-2 Neptune, two converted for electronic intelligence gathering (EP-2J) and four converted for drone support, target towing & test purposes (UP-2J); replaced by P-3C Orion
Kawasaki P2V-7 VSA	Japan	research	1977	retired 1982	1	used for Variable Stability Aircraft research
Kawasaki T-4	Japan	trainer	1988	in use	180	also used as liaison aircraft - replaced Lockheed T-33 & Fuji T-1
Learjet C-36A	US	surveillance	1985	in use	4	
Lockheed C-130H/R	US	transport	1983	in use	20	used by JMSDF & JASDF
Lockheed Martin C-130R	US	transport	2013	in use	6	ex-USAF KC-130R (sold to Japan without refueling system) to replace YS-11M/M-A for troop & cargo movement; two other KC-130H used for aerial refueling
Lockheed Martin F-35A	US	multi-role	2019	in use	38	more on order - some being license-built by Mitsubishi
Lockheed Martin F-35B	US	multi-role	2025 (expected)	First F-35Bs delivered to Japan in August 2025.	3	42 ordered
Lockheed F-104J Eiko	US	interceptor	1966	retired 1986	210	interceptor version of F-104G - some imports & kits and most license-produced by Mitsubishi, some converted to UF-104J radio-controlled target drones; some delivered to Taiwanese Air Force after retirement
Lockheed F-104DJ Eiko	US	trainer	1966	retired 1986	20	dual-control trainer version of F-104J, one built as Lockheed kit & rest assembled by Mitsubishi and Kawasaki; some delivered to Taiwanese Air Force after retirement
Lockheed P2V-7	US	maritime patrol	1959	retired 1981	64	last Neptune variant produced by Lockheed - 48 assembled by Kawasaki, redesignated P-2H (1962)
Lockheed P-3C	US	maritime patrol	1984	in use	54	also used in signals intelligence (EP-3), surveillance (OP-3C) & as trainers (UP-3D)
Lockheed PV-2 Harpoon	US	maritime patrol	1955	retired 1960	17	
Lockheed T-33A	US	trainer	1956	retired 2000	287	subsonic jet trainer manufactured (210) & assembled by Kawasaki
MBB/Kawasaki BK 117	Japan	utility	1982	in use	112	transport helicopter operated by prefectural police departments
McDonnell Douglas F-4EJ	US/Japan	fighter	1971	retired 2021	140	simplified F-4E exported to & 138 license-built by Mitsubishi Heavy Industries, 96 updated to F-4EJ Kai in 1995; replaced F-104J
McDonnell Douglas RF-4E	US	reconnaissance	1974	retired 2020	14	unarmed & similar to RF-4C; replaced RF-86F & replaced by F-15 Eagle
Mitsubishi X-2 Shinshin	Japan	research	2016	retired 2018	1	Japan's first domestically made stealth fighter prototype, also known as ATD-X
Mitsubishi F-4EJ Kai	Japan	fighter-bomber	1989	retired 2021	96	updated F-4EJs with ground attack capabilities; replaced by F-15J
Mitsubishi RF-4EJ	US/Japan	reconnaissance	1992	retired 2020	15	converted from F-4EJ & F-4EJ Kai; replaced by F-15 Eagle
Mitsubishi F-1	Japan	multi-role	1978	retired 2006	77	Japan's first domestically designed & built supersonic combat aircraft, jointly developed by Mitsubishi Heavy Industries - Mitsubishi T-2 trainer airframe modified for anti-ship & ground attack; replaced by Mitsubishi F-2
Mitsubishi F-2A/B Viper Zero	Japan	multi-role	2000	in use	85	derived from F-16 Agile Falcon to replace F-4EJ & Mitsubishi F-1
Mitsubishi F-15J	Japan	fighter	1981	in use	155	all but two license-built by Mitsubishi
Mitsubishi F-15DJ	Japan	trainer	1981	in use	44	all but twelve license-built by Mitsubishi
Mitsubishi F-X	Japan	fighter	2031 (planned)	in development	0	Japan's first domestically developed stealth fighter - developed from X-2 Shinshin & i3 fighter concept, to replace Mitsubishi F-2
Mitsubishi MU-2/LR-1	Japan	utility	1967	retired 2016	~65	Mitsubishi's first post-WWII aircraft design, also used for SAR (MU-2E designated MU-2S - replaced by U-125A) and liaison & photo-reconnaissance (MU-2C/MU-2B-10/MU-2K designated LR-1 - some used as gate guardians at JGSDF bases)
Mitsubishi RP-1	Japan	research	1994	?	1	experimental helicopter developed from Sikorsky S-76
Mitsubishi SH-60J	Japan	SAR	1991	in use	10	license-built Sikorsky UH-60 helicopter for JMSDF, also known as S-70A-12
Mitsubishi SH-60K	Japan	ASW	2005	in use	73	license-built helicopter for JMSDF, replacing SH-60J; more improved versions (SH-60L) on order
Mitsubishi T-2/T-2A/B	Japan	advanced trainer	1975	retired 2006	96	first Japanese-designed aircraft to break the sound barrier & basis of Mitsubishi F-1, armed (T-2B) & unarmed (T-2A) versions; replaced F-86 and was replaced by F-15 & Kawasaki T-4
Mitsubishi T-2 CCV	Japan	research	1983	retired 1986	1	experimental "Control Configuration Vehicle" testbed, built from third T-2 produced; on display at Gifu Kakamigahara Air and Space Museum (2014)
NAMC YS-11	Japan	transport	1965	retired 2021	182	Japan's first post-WWII airliner - replaced DC-3
North American F-86D Gekkō	US	interceptor	1958	retired 1968	122	imported through 1961
North American F-86F Kyokukō	US	fighter	1955	retired 1982	435	imported 180 through 1957 & 300 license-produced by Mitsubishi through 1961; some returned to US Navy as drones (QF-86F)
North American RF-86F	US	reconnaissance	1962	retired 1979	18	converted F-86F-30s with cameras
North American T-6/SNJ Texan	US	trainer	1954	retired 1970	257	all armed - JASDF operated 9 T-6Ds, 11 T-6Fs & 175 T-6Gs and JMSDF operated 10 SNJ-4s, 41 SNJ-5s & 11 SNJ-6s
North American T-28B Trojan	US	trainer	1956	retired 1963	1	
Piper L-21B/PA-18 Super Cub	US	reconnaissance	1953	retired 1965	62	including at least one L-21B//U-7A Super Cub (military designation of Super Cub 135)
SAAB X1G	Sweden	research	1957	retired 1987	1	Saab 91 Safir sold to Japan & modified to test high-lift devices (STOL test platform) for Shin Meiwa PS-1
Shin Meiwa PS-1	Japan	maritime patrol	1971	retired 1989	23	flying boat, one modified (1976) for aerial firefighting; replaced by Lockheed P-3 Orion
Shin Meiwa UF-XS	Japan	research	1962	retired 1967	1	converted Grumman HU-16 Albatross testbed aircraft
ShinMaywa US-1/US-1A	Japan	SAR	1975	retired 2017	20	Japan's first amphibious aircraft, first six produced were US-1s; replaced by US-2
ShinMaywa US-2	Japan	SAR	2009	in use	6	amphibious aircraft, also used as transport & originally called US-1A kai
Sikorsky S-55	US	utility	1953	retired 1976	65	license-built commercial version of H-19 helicopter by Mitsubishi; JG-0001 (H-19C) on display at Tokorozawa Aviation Museum
Sikorsky S-61	US	multi-role	1963	retired 2008	124+	Mitsubishi license-built (S-61A/B)/export version (SH-3) helicopter used for ASW (S-61B/HSS-2/SH-3D/HSS-2A/SH-3H/HSS-2B) and utility & SAR (S-61A)
Sikorsky S-62J	US	SAR	1963	retired 1989	19	license-built amphibious helicopter by Mitsubishi; 53-4774 on display at Hamamatsu Air Park
Sikorsky MH-53E	US	minesweeper	1989	retired 2017	11	helicopter also known as S-80-M-1 in JMSDF, some purchased by US Navy
Sikorsky UH-60J/JA	US	utility	1997	in use	96	license-built SAR/transport helicopter for JASDF & JGSDF, also known as S-70-12
Stinson L-5 Sentinel	US	reconnaissance	1953	retired 1958	35	liaison aircraft
Vertol H-21	US	multi-role	1959	retired 1971	12	mostly H-21B Work Horse (Model 42) SAR helicopters & two Model 44A (transport version of H-21B) used for test/evaluation purposes; Model 44As (JG-0001 & JG-0002) on display at Bihoro Aviation Park & Tokorozawa Aviation Museum and H-21B (02-4756) on display at JASDF Air Park

== See also ==
- List of aircraft of Japan, World War II
