= Kawasaki C-5 =

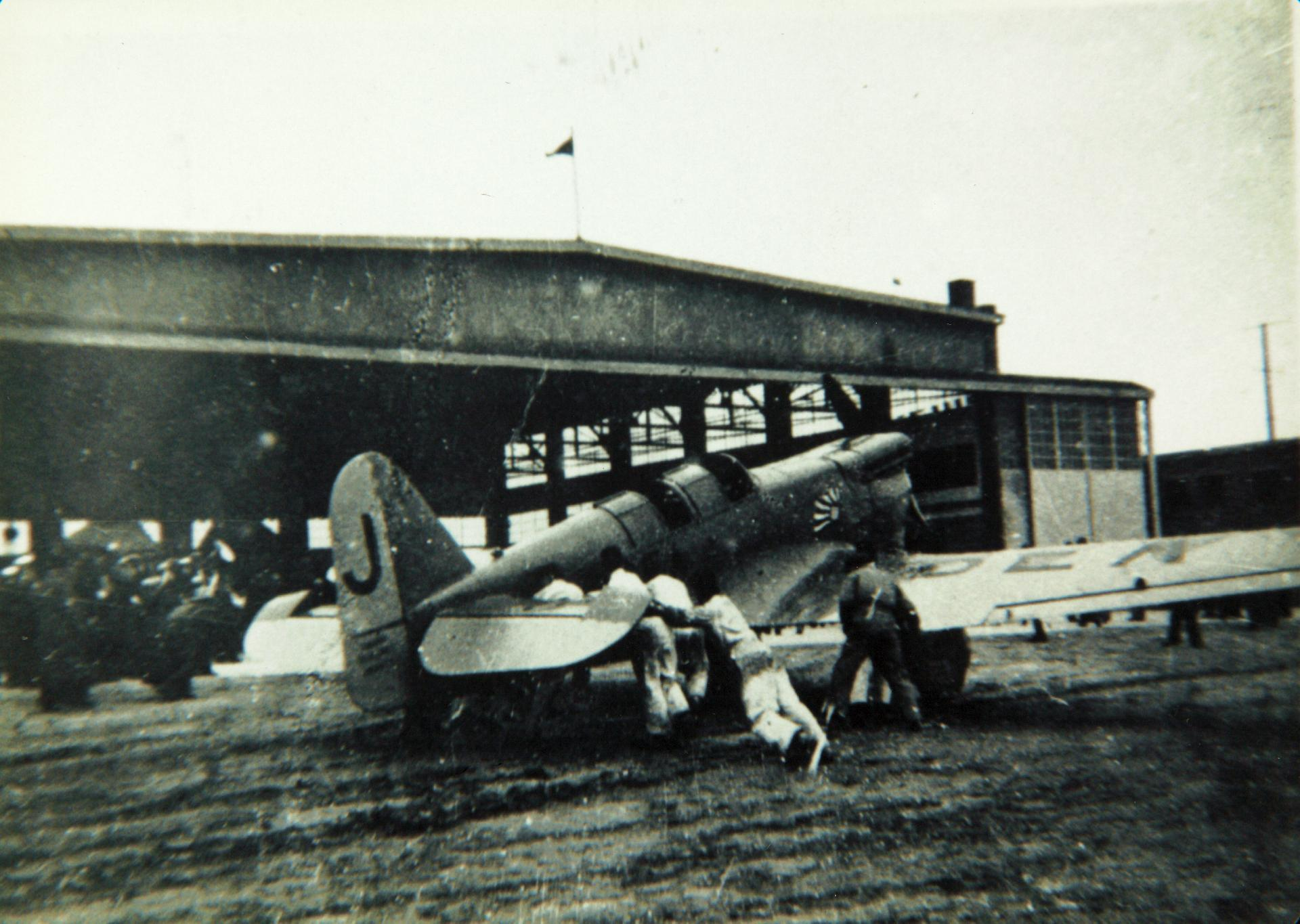

General information
- Type: Civil Communucations aircraft
- National origin: Japan
- Manufacturer: Kawasaki
- Designer: Shegeti Naito
- Number built: 1

History
- First flight: 17 February 1934

The Kawasaki C-5 (or KDC-5) was a 1930s Japanese civil high speed long range monoplane built for the Japanese Asahi Shimbun newspaper to gather and disseminate news across the Japanese empire.

== Design and development ==
In June 1933 the Asahi Shimbun ordered a fast, long range communications aircraft from Kawasaki Aircraft Industries (川崎航空機工業株式会社, Kawasaki Kokuki Kogyo K.K.), resulting in the Kawasaki KDC-5, which was commonly referred to as the C-5. It was a scaled-up, civilianised version of the single-seat monoplane Kawasaki Ki-5 fighter with enclosed seating for its two crew and single passenger.

The C-5 was a low wing cantilever monoplane with an all metal structure and a metal covering with fabric covered control surfaces. The wings had a large root fairing, and tapered to rounded tips with part of centre section trailing edge cut away.

It was powered by an unsupercharged BMW VIIa V12 engine built under licence by Kawasaki, with the radiator mounted under the engine. A navigator's cockpit was provided behind the pilot, while an unglazed space between them could accommodate a passenger or equipment. The C-5's tailplane was mounted at the top of the main fuselage structure and braced from below. Its fin was triangular, carrying a straight-edged, upright rudder. Both rudder and elevators were balanced.

It had a fixed tailwheel landing gear. The undercarriage legs and most of the wheels were enclosed in broad spats, unusual only in that behind the legs they were split into inner and outer panels that could be opened on landing to act as air brakes. The wheels were fitted with conventional brakes.

== Operational history ==
Earlier experience with the Ki-5 shortened the testing programme for the C-5. Flying from Kagamigahara, testing was carried out from the 17th to the 20th of February, 1934. The C-5 was then registered by Asahi Shimbun. At the time, it was the fastest Japanese civil aircraft flying, and had the greatest range, ideal for delivering news reports across the Japanese empire, at the time of the Second Sino-Japanese War. In March 1934 a non-stop flight was planned from Osaka to Xinjing (now named Changchun) in Manchuria, to bring news of celebrations of the anniversary of the creation of Manchuria, although the fuel froze not long after departure, ending the flight prematurely.

Despite this, the C-5 later set several speed and distance records. On 14 September 1934 it was flown by Mosaburo Niino and Kenjii Tsukagoshii from Beijing to Tokyo via Osaka, a distance of 2,630 km (1,630 mi) in 9 hr 34 min.

The C-5 was used by Asahi Shimbun alongside the Kawasaki KDA-6/A-6 biplane, an enlarged Kawasaki Army Type 92 Fighter/KDA-5.

== Specifications ==
Data from Japanese Aircraft 1910-1941

General characteristics

- Crew: two, pilot and navigator
- Capacity: one passenger
- Length: 9.13 m (29 ft 11 in)
- Wingspan: 13.42 m (44 ft 0 in)
- Height: 4.0 m (13 ft 1 in) tail up
- Wing area: 30 m^{2} (320 sq ft)
- Airfoil: M-12
- Empty weight: 1,725 kg (3,803 lb)
- Gross weight: 2,860 kg (6,305 lb)
- Powerplant: 1 × Kawasaki BMW VIIa water-cooled V-12 producing 450–560 kW (600–750 hp)
- Propellers: 2-bladed wooden

Performance

- Maximum speed: 336 km/h (209 mph, 182 kn)
- Cruise speed: 251 km/h (156 mph, 136 kn)
- Landing speed: 126 km/h (78 mph; 68 kn)
- Range: 1,070 km (660 mi, 580 nmi)
- Service ceiling: 7,000 m (23,000 ft)
- Time to altitude: 7.5 min to 3,000 m (9,800 ft)
