= Kawasaki Ki-5 =

Japanese experimental fighter

Ki-5

General information
- Type: Experimental Fighter Aircraft
- Manufacturer: Kawasaki Kōkūki Kōgyō K.K.
- Designer: Richard Vogt
- Primary user: IJA Air Force

History
- Manufactured: 4
- First flight: February 1934
- Variant: Kawasaki Ki-28

The Kawasaki Ki-5 (川崎 キ5, Ki-go) was an experimental low-wing monoplane fighter aircraft designed for the Imperial Japanese Army Air Force. It first flew in February 1934, but was never produced for actual use. It was the last Japanese design led by Richard Vogt before he returned to Germany.

== Design and development ==
The Ki-5 was initially produced by Kawasaki Kōkūki Kōgyō K.K. in response to Japanese army specifications for a high-performance fighter to replace the existing Type 92. It was the first all-metal, cantilever monoplane fighter aircraft to be built in Japan. It was designed around the Kawasaki Ha-9, a Japanese development of the BMW IX aircraft engine, itself a development from the BMW VII A 7.3 liquid-cooled engine, with a nominal rating of 634 kW (850 hp). It also had the innovation of using an inverted gull wing design, to improve downward visibility for the pilot and to be able to use a simple, short undercarriage.

However, the Ki-5 design quickly proved unsatisfactory in flight testing. Test pilots complained of stability and handling problems, and the engine was never able to produce enough power for the Ki-5 to attain its design speed parameter of 380 km/h (240 mph).

The project was cancelled on 9 September 1934, after a total of four units were produced. However, the design effort on the Ki-4 later paid off dividends with the designs for the future Ki-28, Ki-60 and Ki-61.

== Operators ==
Japan

- Imperial Japanese Army Air Force

== Specifications ==
Data from Famous Aircraft of the World, no.76: Japanese Army Experimental Fighters (1)

General characteristics

- Crew: 1
- Length: 7.78 m (25 ft 6 in)
- Wingspan: 10.6 m (34 ft 9 in)
- Height: 2.6 m (8 ft 6 in)
- Wing area: 18 m^{2} (190 sq ft)
- Airfoil: NACA M-12
- Empty weight: 1,500 kg (3,307 lb)
- Gross weight: 1,870 kg (4,123 lb)
- Powerplant: 1 × Kawasaki Ha9 V-12 liquid-cooled piston engine, 634 kW (850 hp) 2
- Propellers: fixed-pitch propeller-bladed

Performance

- Maximum speed: 360 km/h (220 mph, 190 kn) at 2,400 m (7,874 ft)
- Range: 1,000 km (620 mi, 540 nmi)
- Service ceiling: 9,400 m (30,800 ft)
- Time to altitude: 5,000 metres (16,000 ft) in 8 minutes
- Wing loading: 103.9 kg/m^{2} (21.3 lb/sq ft)
- Power/mass: 0.35 kW/kg (0.21 hp/lb)

Armament

- Guns: 2× 7.7 mm (.303 in) machine guns

== See also ==
- List of military aircraft of Japan

Aircraft of comparable role, configuration, and era

- Supermarine Type 224

== Bibliography ==
- Mikesh, Robert C.; Abe, Shorzoe (1990). Japanese Aircraft, 1910-1941. Annapolis, MD: Naval Institute Press. ISBN 1-55750-563-2.
- "Japanese Army Experimental Fighters (1)". Famous Aircraft of the World. No. 76. Tokyo, Japan: Bunrin-Do Co. August 1976.
