= Kawasaki Ki-88 =

Fighter Aircraft

Ki-88
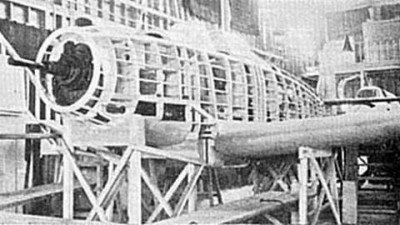
- The mock-up of the Kawasaki Ki-88 in 1943.

General information
- Type: Fighter aircraft
- Manufacturer: Kawasaki Kōkūki Kōgyō K.K.
- Primary user: Imperial Japanese Army Air Force (intended)
- Number built: None

The Kawasaki Ki-88 was a proposed Japanese World War II fighter aircraft intended for use by the Imperial Japanese Army Air Force. Its anticipated performance was disappointing and only a mock-up was completed.

== Design and development ==
Faced with delays in development of the Kawasaki Ki-64 fighter, the Imperial Japanese Army was open in 1942 to alternative fighter designs that might reach combat units more quickly. Kawasaki proposed the Ki-88, a design inspired by the Bell P-39 Airacobra fighter then in service with the United States Army Air Forces.

Kawasaki began design work on the Ki-88 in August 1942. The Ki-88 was to have a 1,117-kW (1,500-hp) Kawasaki Ha-140 engine behind its cockpit, driving a tractor propeller through an extension shaft. It was to mount a 37-mm cannon in its propeller shaft and two 20-mm cannons in its lower nose.

When design work had progressed far enough to allow it, Kawasaki built a full-scale mock-up of the Ki-88, which bore a strong resemblance to the P-39. After inspection of the mockup, the Japanese calculated a maximum speed for the aircraft of 600 km/h (373 mph) at an altitude of 6,000 m (19,685 feet). This was only slightly faster than the Kawasaki Ki-61 Hien fighter, which already was in production. As a result, Kawasaki discontinued design work on the Ki-88 less than a year after beginning it.

== Specifications ==
Data from Japanese Aircraft of the Pacific War

General characteristics

- Crew: 1
- Length: 10.2 m (33 ft 6 in)
- Wingspan: 12.4 m (40 ft 8 in)
- Height: 4.15 m (13 ft 7 in)
- Gross weight: 3,900 kg (8,598 lb)
- Powerplant: 1 × Kawasaki Ha-140 18-cyl. liquid-cooled piston engine, 1,120 kW (1,500 hp)

Performance

- Maximum speed: 600 km/h (370 mph, 320 kn) at 6,000 m (19,685 ft)
- Range: 1,200 km (750 mi, 650 nmi)

Armament

- 1× 37mm Ho-203 cannon in the propeller hub
- 2× 20mm Ho-5 cannons in the lower fuselage

== See also ==
Aircraft of comparable role, configuration, and era

- Bell P-39 Airacobra
- Bell P-63 Kingcobra

Related lists

- List of military aircraft of Japan
