= Kawasaki KAT-1 =

Japanese military trainer aircraft prototype

KAT-1
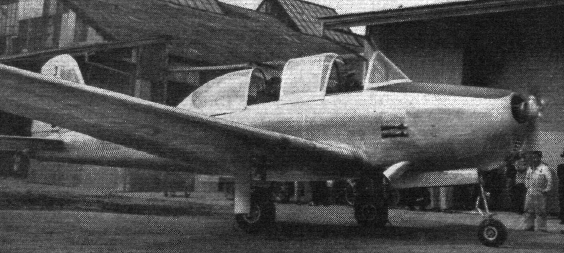

General information
- Type: Two seat primary training aircraft
- National origin: Japan
- Manufacturer: Kawasaki
- Number built: at least 2

History
- First flight: 11 February 1954

The Kawasaki KAT-1 is a Japanese primary trainer, seating two in tandem, designed to compete for a Japanese Air Defense Force (JADF) contract in the mid-1950s. Only two were completed.

== Design and development ==
The KAT-1 was designed as a primary trainer for the JADF in competition with the Fuji-built, US designed Beech Model 45 Mentor. It has a good deal in common with its Kawasaki contemporary, the KAL-2 both in layout and shared components. The major difference between the two types is capacity and accommodation; the KAL-2 seats up to five in two rows in a broad cabin whereas the KAT-1 has two seats in tandem, under lower and narrower glazing.

The KAT-1 is a cantilever low wing monoplane. Its wing is of trapezoidal plan with blunt tips, constructed from two metal spars and stressed aluminium skin. Inboard of the ailerons, which are fabric covered over aluminium alloy frames and mass balanced, there are hydraulically operated split flaps. The horizontal tail, mounted on the top of the fuselage, is also straight tapered with blunt tips but the fin and rudder are more rounded, with a long dorsal fillet reaching forward to the rear of the cockpit glazing. All the rear surfaces have alloy frames and fabric covering. The rudder and elevator are both statically and aerodynamically balanced and carry trim tabs.

The fuselage of the KAT-1 is a stressed skin alloy semi-monocoque, with a 240 hp (179 kW) Lycoming GO-435 flat-six engine installed in the nose, driving a two-blade variable-pitch propeller. Student and instructor occupy tandem cockpits fitted with dual controls under individual sliding sections in the continuous glazing. The KAT-1 has a retractable tricycle undercarriage with oleo-pneumatic shock absorbers and hydraulic brakes.

== Operational history ==
Two prototypes were flown but the Beech Mentor was chosen in preference by the JADF as its primary trainer. The first prototype served with the Japan Ground Self-Defense Force.

== Aircraft on display ==
- Kakamigahara Aerospace Museum: First prototype JA3084

== Specifications ==
Data from Jane's All the World's Aircraft 1956/57

General characteristics

- Crew: Two
- Length: 8.50 m (27 ft 11 in)
- Wingspan: 11.50 m (37 ft 9 in)
- Height: 2.80 m (9 ft 2 in)
- Wing area: 18.6 m^{2} (200 sq ft)
- Aspect ratio: 7.1
- Airfoil: NACA 2R1 16.5 at root, NACA 2410 at tip
- Empty weight: 1,070 kg (2,359 lb)
- Gross weight: 1,385 kg (3,053 lb)
- Powerplant: 1 × Lycoming GO-435-C2B 6-cylinder horizontally opposed air-cooled, 180 kW (240 hp)
- Propellers: 2-bladed Hartzell Propeller, 2.29 m (7 ft 6 in) diameter metal, variable pitch

Performance

- Maximum speed: 303 km/h (188 mph, 164 kn) at sea level
- Cruise speed: 225 km/h (140 mph, 121 kn) 40% power at 2,135 m (7,000 ft)
- Range: 1,140 km (710 mi, 620 nmi) maximum, at 40% power at 3,050 m (10,000 ft)
- Service ceiling: 6,100 m (20,000 ft) service
- Rate of climb: 5.6 m/s (1,100 ft/min) initial
- Wing loading: 74.5 kg/m^{2} (15.3 lb/sq ft)
- Power/mass: 129 W/kg (0.079 hp/lb)
- Take-off run: 168 m (550 ft) at sea level, no wind
- Landing run: 206 m (680 ft) at sea level, no wind
- Landing speed: 83.5 km/h (52 mph) with flaps extended
