= Kawasaki KAL-2 =

Prototype Japanese Aircaft

KAL-2
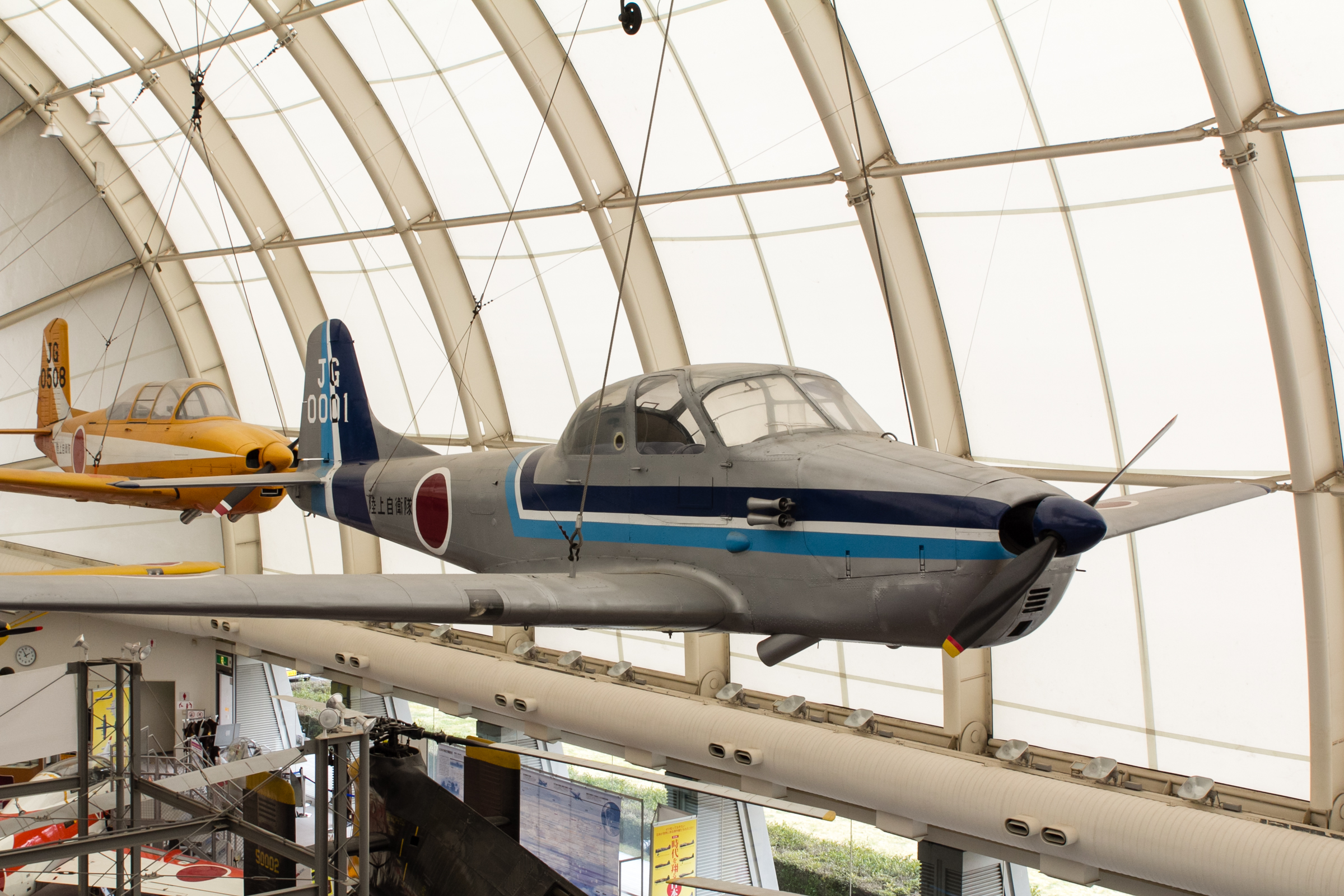

General information
- Type: Four/ five seat cabin aircraft
- National origin: Japan
- Manufacturer: Kawasaki
- Number built: 2

History
- First flight: 25 November 1954

The Kawasaki KAL-2 is a Japanese four/five seat, single engine aircraft, designed for both military and civil markets in the mid-1950s. Only two were completed.

== Design and development ==
The KAL-2 was a successor to the KAL-1, an earlier cabin monoplane and Kawasaki's first post-war design. It had more in common with its Kawasaki contemporary, the KAT-1 primary trainer in layout and in shared components. The major difference between the two types was accommodation, the KAL-2 seating up to five in two rows in a broad cabin whereas the KAT-1 has two seats in tandem in a narrower fuselage.

The KAL-2 is a cantilever low wing monoplane. Its wing is of blunt tipped, approximately trapezoidal plan but with slightly greater sweep on the centre section leading edges than outboard. It is constructed from two metal spars and stressed aluminium skin. Inboard of the ailerons, which are fabric covered over aluminium alloy frames and mass balanced, there are hydraulically operated split flaps. The horizontal tail, mounted on the top of the fuselage, is also straight tapered with blunt tips but the fin and rudder are more rounded, with a dorsal fillet. All the rear surfaces have alloy frames and fabric covering. The rudder and elevator are both statically and aerodynamically balanced and carried trim tabs.

The fuselage of the KAL-2 is a stressed skin alloy semi-monocoque with a 240 hp (179 kW) Lycoming GO-435 flat-six engine installed in the nose, driving a two blade variable-pitch propeller. The military prototypes had the -435-C2 engine variant but civil KAT-2s were intended to have a -435-C2B. The side-by-side seating in the KAL-2 required a wider fuselage than that of the KAT-1; unlike the KAL-1, where the rear cabin roof merged into the upper fuselage line, the transparent roof of the KAL-2s cabin drops down aft to a lower rear fuselage. There are two seats in front, fitted with dual control and a bench seat for two or three passengers behind. Those at the front have an explosively released starboard side door for emergency escape, rear seat occupants leaving via canopy roof panels. The interior has sound-proofing. The KAL-2 has a retractable tricycle undercarriage with oleo-pneumatic shock absorbers and hydraulic brakes.

== Operational history ==
Two prototypes were flown. One prototype served with the Japan Air Self-Defense Force, the other with the Japan Maritime Self-Defense Force.

== Aircraft on display ==
- Tokorozawa Aviation Museum: KAL-2 serial 20001.

== Specifications (civil version) ==
Data from Jane's All the World's Aircraft 1956/57

General characteristics

- Capacity: Four to five
- Length: 8.820 m (28 ft 11 in)
- Wingspan: 11.924 m (39 ft 1 in)
- Height: 2.694 m (8 ft 10 in)
- Wing area: 19.6 m^{2} (211 sq ft)
- Aspect ratio: 7.2
- Airfoil: NACA 2R1 16.5 at root, NACA 2410 at tip
- Empty weight: 1,110 kg (2,447 lb)
- Gross weight: 16,000 kg (35,274 lb)
- Fuel capacity: 300 L (66 Imp gal; 79 US gal)
- Powerplant: 1 × Lycoming GO-435-C2B 6-cylinder horizontally opposed air-cooled, 180 kW (240 hp)
- Propellers: 2-bladed Hartzell Propeller, 2.29 m (7 ft 6 in) diameter metal, variable pitch

Performance

- Maximum speed: 293 km/h (182 mph, 158 kn) at sea level
- Cruise speed: 210 km/h (130 mph, 110 kn) 40% power at 2,135 m (7,000 ft)
- Range: 1,600 km (990 mi, 860 nmi) maximum, at 40% power at 2,135 m (7,000 ft)
- Service ceiling: 4,500 m (14,800 ft) service
- Rate of climb: 4.7 m/s (930 ft/min) initial
- Wing loading: 81.5 kg/m^{2} (16.7 lb/sq ft)
- Power/mass: 91 W/kg (0.058 hp/lb)
- Take-off run: 350 m (1,150 ft) at sea level, no wind
- Landing run: 430 m 1,4100 ft at sea level, no wind
- Landing speed: 87 km/h (54 mph) with flaps extended
