= Kawasaki KAQ-1 =

Type of aerial target drone

KAQ-1
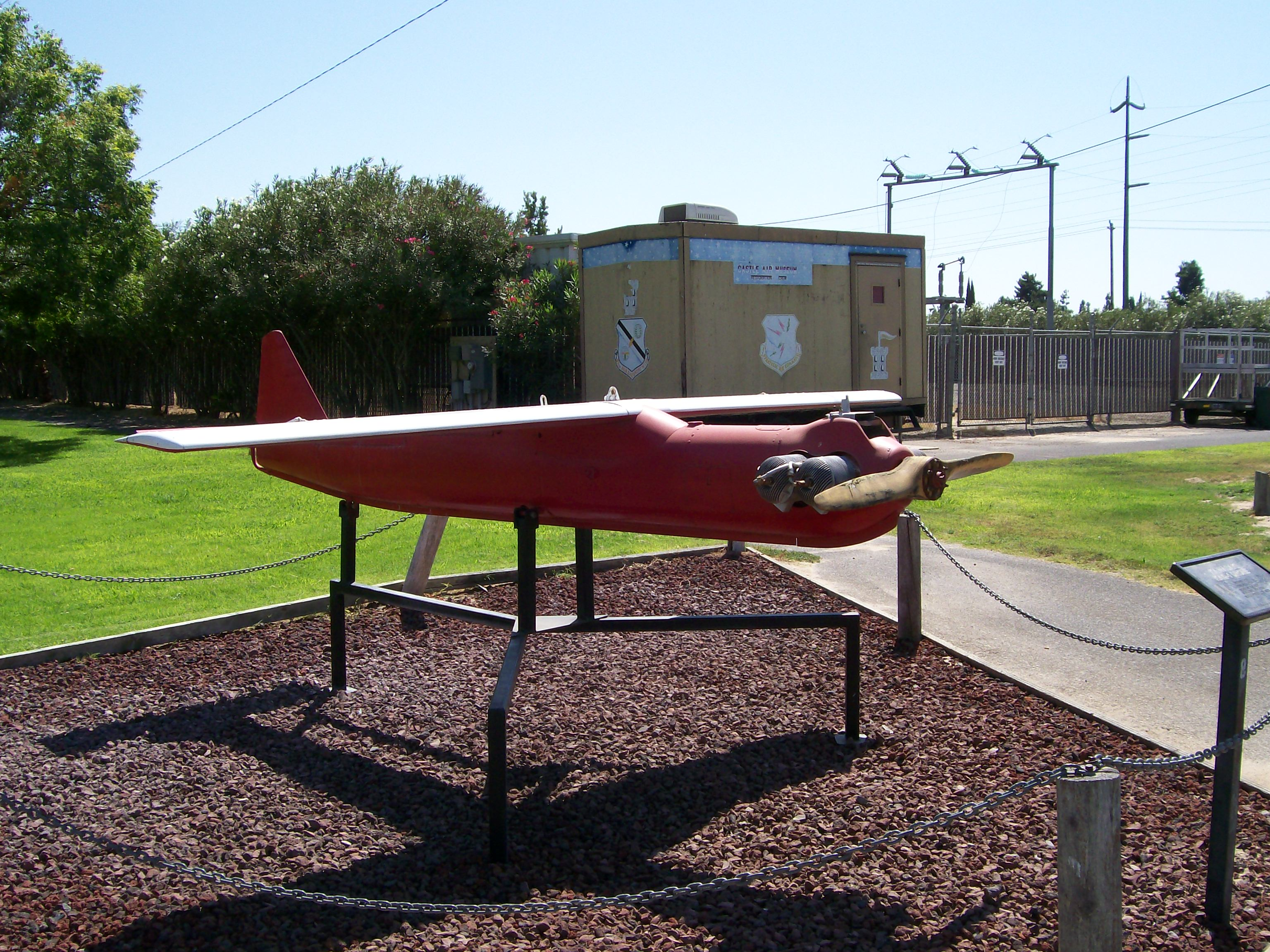
- KAQ-1 on display at Castle Air Museum

General information
- Type: Aerial Target Drone
- Manufacturer: Kawasaki Aerospace
- Status: Retired
- Primary user: United States, Japan

History
- Introduction date: 1950s

The Kawasaki KAQ-1 was a small, radio controlled target drone aircraft manufactured by the Kawasaki Aerospace Company which was used by the armed forces of Japan and the United States to train fighter pilots and anti-aircraft gunners.

== Purpose ==
The main purpose of the KAQ-1 drone was to train fighter pilots in the use of air-to-air missiles and to train anti-aircraft gunners on the ground. Alongside this the KAQ-1 was also used as a target in the testing of new weapon systems. The drone was used in this role throughout the 1950s by the armed forces of both Japan and the United States. When in US service, the KAQ-1 was mainly used by those units stationed in Japan.

== Operational Use ==
In operation the KAQ-1 was launched from a ramp where after it was guided to a predetermined altitude and was them fired upon. If destroyed, a parachute rigged to the engine mounts would allow the drone's engine to be recovered and reused. When the KAQ-1 is not destroyed in operation, it is recovered via a parachute which is triggered by the drone operator or when the minimum allowable flight altitude is reached.

== Operators ==
- Japan: Japan Ground Self Defense Force
- United States: United States Armed Forces

== Specifications (KAQ-1) ==
Data from Castle Air Museum's KAQ-1 web page and Avia.Pro web page.

General characteristics

- Length: 12 ft 0 in (3.66 m)
- Wingspan: 11 ft 6 in (3.51 m)
- Height: 2 ft 7 in (0.79 m)
- Max takeoff weight: 342 lb (155 kg)
- Powerplant: 1 × McCulloch 4318A 4-cyl. air-cooled horizontally-opposed piston engine, 75 hp (56 kW)

Performance

- Maximum speed: 300 kn (350 mph, 560 km/h)
- Cruise speed: 130 kn (160 mph, 250 km/h)
- Range: 43 nmi (50 mi, 80 km)
- Service ceiling: 13,500 ft (4,100 m)
