= Kawasaki Ki-56 =

Japanese light transport aircraft

Ki-56
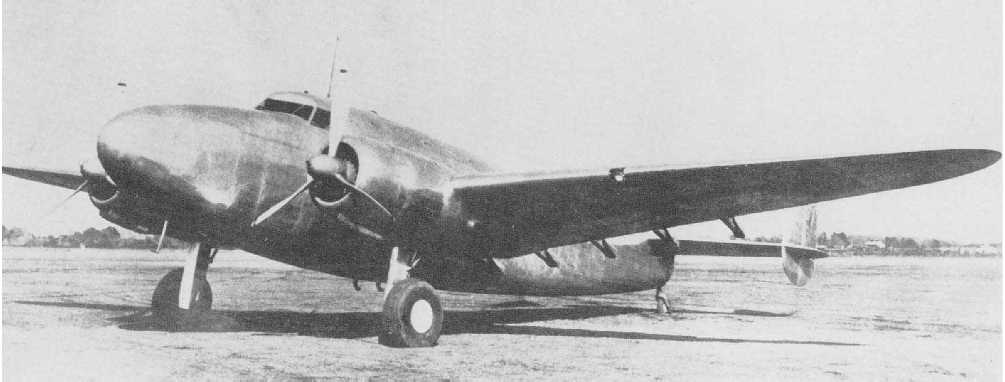

General information
- Type: Light transport
- Manufacturer: Kawasaki Kōkūki Kōgyō K.K.
- Designer: Takeo Doi
- Number built: 121

History
- Manufactured: 1940-1943
- Introduction date: 1940
- Developed from: Lockheed Model 14 Super Electra

The Kawasaki Ki-56 (Japanese: 一式貨物輸送機, Type 1 Freight Transport) was a Japanese, two-engine light transport aircraft used during World War II. It was known to the Allies by the reporting name Thalia. One-hundred twenty-one were built between 1940-43.

== Design and development ==
The Kawasaki Ki-56 was derived from the Lockheed Model 14 Super Electra aircraft that the Kawasaki Kokuki Kogyo Kabushiki Kaisha (The Kawasaki Aircraft Engineering Company Limited) had built under licence. In September 1939, Kawasaki was asked by the Koku Hombu to design an improved version as Ki-56. A number was also built by Tachikawa Hikoki K.K.

== Operational history ==
The Japanese invasion of Sumatra in the Dutch East Indies campaign began with a paratroop drop from Ki-56 transports on Airfield P1 and the oil refineries near Palembang. Royal Air Force Hawker Hurricane fighters flying from P1 to locate the Japanese invasion fleet passed the incoming Ki-56s but thought them to be friendly Lockheed Hudsons (also developed from the Lockheed Model 14) returning from a raid. The defending anti-aircraft gunners at P1 were equally fooled, until parachutes began to open. Once the AA guns opened fire, one transport was shot down, another force-landed, and others veered off course. The paratroop drop was effective, and the airfield and oil installations were overrun.

== Accidents and incidents ==
- On March 28, 1946, a Dalstroi Aviation Ki-56 (514) crashed on takeoff from Zyrianka, Russia due to crew error, killing the pilot.
- On December 7, 1946, a Dalstroi Aviation Ki-56 (6) crashed on climbout from Berelakh, Magadan, Russia (then part of the Khabarovsk Territory) due to double engine failure, killing all seven on board.

== Specifications (Ki-56) ==
Data from Encyclopedia of Military Aircraft; Japanese Aircraft of the Pacific War

General characteristics

- Crew: 4 (pilot, co-pilot, navigator, & radio operator)
- Capacity: 2,400 kg (5,300 lb)
- Length: 14.9 m (48 ft 11 in)
- Wingspan: 19.96 m (65 ft 6 in)
- Height: 3.6 m (11 ft 10 in)
- Wing area: 51.2 m^{2} (551 sq ft)
- Empty weight: 4,672 kg (10,300 lb)
- Gross weight: 8,024 kg (17,690 lb)
- Powerplant: 2 × Nakajima Ha-25 14-cylinder two-row air-cooled radial piston engines, 740 kW (990 hp) each
- Propellers: 3-bladed constant-speed propellers

Performance

- Maximum speed: 400 km/h (250 mph, 220 kn) at 3,500 m (11,500 ft)
- Range: 3,300 km (2,100 mi, 1,800 nmi)
- Service ceiling: 8,000 m (26,000 ft)
- Time to altitude: 12 min 38 s to 3,000 m (9,800 ft)
- Wing loading: 156.7 kg/m^{2} (32.1 lb/sq ft)
- Power/mass: 0.184 kW/kg (0.112 hp/lb)

== See also ==
Aircraft of comparable role, configuration, and era

- Lockheed Hudson

Related lists

- List of aircraft of World War II
- List of military aircraft of Japan
