= Kawasaki Ki-3 =

1933 Japanese light bomber

Ki-3
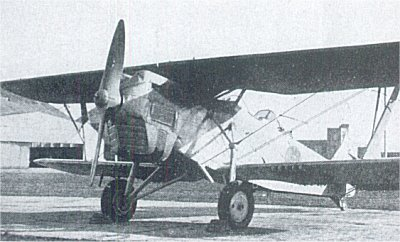
- Kawasaki Ki-3 (Army Type 93-1 single-engine Light bomber)

General information
- Type: Light bomber
- Manufacturer: Kawasaki Kōkūki Kōgyō K.K.
- Designer: Takeo Doi
- Primary user: IJA Air Force
- Number built: 243

History
- Manufactured: 1933–1935
- Introduction date: 1934
- First flight: 1933

The Kawasaki Ki-3 (九三式単軽爆撃機, Kyūsan-shiki tankei bakugekiki) was a light bomber built by Kawasaki Kōkūki Kōgyō K.K. for the Imperial Japanese Army (IJA) in the 1930s. It was the last biplane bomber design to be produced for the Imperial Japanese Army Air Force, and it saw combat service in Manchukuo and in North China during the early stages of the Second Sino-Japanese War.

== Design & Development ==
The Ki-3 was a biplane design of all-metal construction with light alloy and fabric covering, staggered wings, and a fixed, divided landing gear. It was powered by one supercharged 592 kW (790 hp) BMW IX V12 inline engine, driving a wooden two-bladed propeller. Maximum speed was 259 km/h (161 mph) and maximum take-off weight 3,097 kg (6,828 lb). One 7.7 mm (.303 in) machine gun was mounted to fire forward, synchronized with the propeller, and another was mounted dorsally on a flexible mount. The maximum bomb load was 500 kg (1,100 lb). The two man crew sat in open cockpits.

== KDA-6 and A-6 ==
The Ki-3 originated as a private venture, launched by Kawasaki to develop a dedicated reconnaissance aircraft. The latter's prototype, designated KDA-6, was designed by the German engineer Dr. Richard Vogt, who was working in Japan at the time. Takeo Doi, the future chief designer for Kawasaki, worked as Vogt's assistant on the project; Vogt later went on to become chief designer for Blohm & Voss. The KDA-6 was rejected by the IJA due to changes in the procurement process, despite having excellent performance and handling characteristics. Awarded the contract to build the Army Type 93 Single-engined Light Bomber, Kawasaki used their experience of the KDA-6 in their design for this new aircraft, which was given the Kitai number Ki-3.

A civilian version of the KDA-6, later designated Kawasaki A-6, was produced as a communications aircraft and was used successfully by the Asahi Shimbun newspaper for printing plate and personnel transport duties.

== Operational history ==
The Kawasaki Ki-3 was designated "Army Type 93-1 Single-engine Light Bomber" under the other Japanese military aircraft nomenclature system. It flew in April 1933 and entered operational service initially with the 6th Composite Air Regiment in Chosen (Korea). It subsequently was used in combat in Manchukuo (Manchuria) and in North China during the initial stages of the Second Sino-Japanese War, where it could make use of its good maneuverability to support ground troops. It was considered a rugged ground-attack aircraft, but the supercharger of its liquid-cooled engine was a constant source of problems.

== Variants ==
- Ki-3 (Army Type 93-1 Single-engine Light Bomber). 243 built (3 prototypes, 200 by Kawasaki and 40 by Tachikawa Aircraft Company Ltd) from January 1934 till March 1935.

== Operators ==
Japan

- Imperial Japanese Army Air Force

== Specifications (Ki-3) ==
Data from Japanese Aircraft, 1910–1941

General characteristics

- Crew: 2
- Length: 10 m (32 ft 9.6 in)
- Wingspan: 13 m (42 ft 7.8 in)
- Height: 3.0 m (9 ft 10 in)
- Wing area: 38 m^{2} (409 sq ft)
- Empty weight: 1,650 kg (3,638 lb)
- Gross weight: 3,097 kg (6,828 lb)
- Powerplant: 1 × Supercharged BMW IX liquid-cooled V12 engine , 592 kW (790 hp)

Performance

- Maximum speed: 259 km/h (161 mph, 140 kn)
- Service ceiling: 7,000 m (23,000 ft)

Armament

- 2× 7.7 mm (0.303 in) machine guns
- 500 kg (1,102 lb) of bombs

== See also ==
Related lists

- List of military aircraft of Japan

== Bibliography ==
- Francillon, Ph.D., René J. (1979). Japanese Aircraft of the Pacific War. London: Putnam & Company Ltd. ISBN 0-370-30251-6.
- Lake, Jon (2002). Great Book of Bombers. pp86: Zenith Press. ISBN 0-7603-1347-4.
- Mikesh, Robert; Abe, Shorzoe (1990). Japanese Aircraft, 1910-1941. Annapolis, MD: Naval Institute Press. ISBN 1-55750-563-2.
