= Flight inspection =

Periodic evaluation of navigational aids in aviation

Flight inspection refers to the periodic evaluation of navigational aids used in aviation, such as flight procedures and electronic signals, to ensure they are safe and accurate. Unlike flight tests, which analyze the aerodynamic design and safety of the aircraft itself, flight inspection comprises reviewing flight procedures (such as routes, approaches and departures) to ensure navigational support is sufficient, there are no obstacles and the procedure is reliable.

Flight inspectors originally tested the accuracy of light beacons sighted while flying. These beacons allowed pilots to fly at night with visual guidance. Radio navigation systems followed, with inspectors testing the radio transmitters while airborne, and then GPS.

Customized aircraft are used for flight inspection, with dedicated receivers and sensors to collect data from the navigational aids being inspected. Computers decode the data and compare to the real aircraft position, with results displayed to the inspector for verification while airborne. Standards for flight inspection are provided by organisations such as the International Civil Aviation Organization and Federal Aviation Administration.

== See also ==
- Index of aviation articles
- List of aviation mnemonics
