= Kawasaki Ki-91 =

WWII Japanese heavy bomber

Ki-91
- Mockup of the Ki-91

General information
- Type: Heavy bomber
- Manufacturer: Kawasaki Aircraft Industries
- Primary user: Imperial Japanese Army Air Service (planned)

History
- Manufactured: 0 (1st prototype 60% complete)

The Kawasaki Ki-91 was a Japanese heavy bomber developed by Kawasaki Aircraft Industries during the later years of World War II.

== Development ==
In early 1943, following the cancellation of the Nakajima Ki-68 and Kawanishi Ki-85 due to the failure of the Nakajima G5N, Kawasaki responded to the Imperial Japanese Army's requirement for a long-range bomber of similar size and performance to the B-29 Superfortress with the Ki-91. Like the G5N, Ki-68, and Ki-85, the Ki-91 was to be capable of launching attacks on the continental US from Japan. In April 1944, a wooden mockup was built for inspection and, by May, production of the first prototype was ordered. Construction of the prototype began in June, but the first B-29 raids on Japan were underway beginning that month. In February 1945, the first Ki-91 prototype was 60 percent complete when a B-29 air raid damaged the facility in Gifu Prefecture where the Ki-91 prototype was being built, bringing the program to a halt.

== Design ==
The Ki-91 was a design for a heavy bomber similar in size and bombload to the B-29 Superfortress and Consolidated B-32. It had a bigger wingspan and fuselage than the B-29 and B-32 and featured a pressurized cabin to allow high-altitude flights. The prototype was to lack a pressurized cabin, but production aircraft were to be built with the pressurized cabin.

== Specifications ==
Data from

General characteristics

- Crew: 8
- Length: 32.97 m (108 ft 2 in)
- Wingspan: 47.9 m (157 ft 2 in)
- Height: 9.99 m (32 ft 9 in)
- Wing area: 223.99 m^{2} (2,411.0 sq ft)
- Empty weight: 33,999 kg (74,955 lb)
- Gross weight: 57,999 kg (127,866 lb)
- Powerplant: 4 × Mitsubishi Ha-214 Ru 18-cylinder air-cooled radial piston engines, 1,900 kW (2,500 hp) each
- Propellers: 4-bladed constant-speed propeller

Performance

- Maximum speed: 580 km/h (360 mph, 310 kn) at 9,808 m (32,178 ft)
- Range: 9,000–10,000 km (5,600–6,200 mi, 4,900–5,400 nmi)
- Service ceiling: 13,500 m (44,300 ft)
- Time to altitude: 8,000 m (26,000 ft) in 20 minutes 30 seconds

Armament

- Guns:

12x 20 mm (0.787 in) machine guns (8 in a double gun-mount configuration and 4 in a quadruple gun-mount configuration)

- Bombs: up to 4,000 kg (8,800 lb) of bombs

== See also ==
- Amerikabomber
