= Kawasaki Ki-78 =

Japanese experimental high-speed aircraft

Ki-78
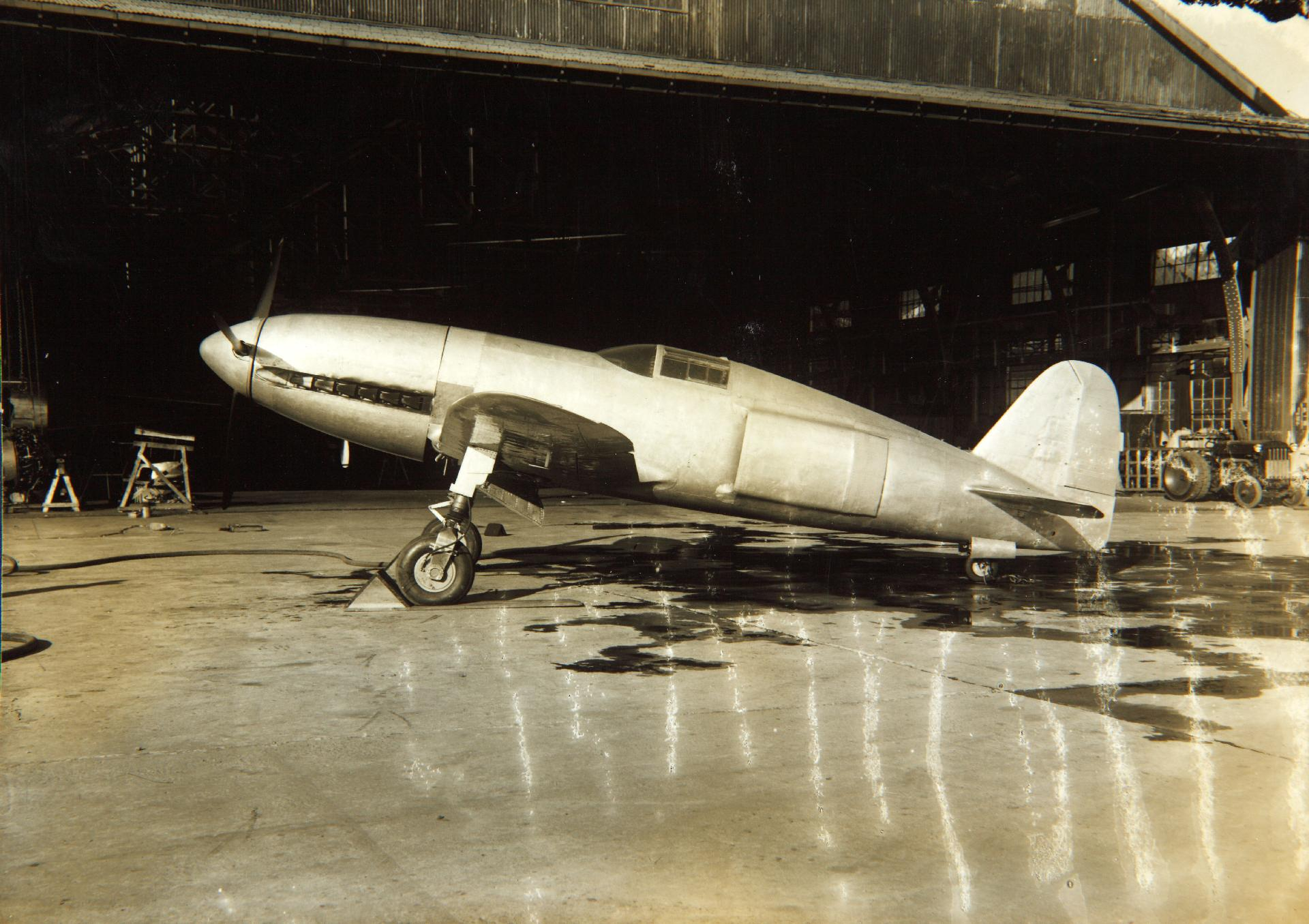

General information
- Type: High speed research aircraft
- National origin: Japan
- Manufacturer: Kawasaki Kokuki Kogyo K.K.
- Designer: Aeronautical Research Institute of the University of Tokyo
- Number built: 1 completed + 1x mock-up and the partially complete 2nd prototype

History
- First flight: 26 December 1942

The Kawasaki Ki-78, originally given the designation Ken III (Kensan - research III), was a high-speed research aircraft (after research projects of long-range and high-altitude aircraft), which also was intended to try to break the world absolute speed record.

== Design and development ==
The Kawasaki Ki-78 was a high-speed research aircraft developed to investigate laminar profile wings with high wing loadings. Early in 1938, a high-speed research program was started at the Aeronautical Research Institute of the University of Tokyo for a small, single-seat aircraft.

The Ki-78 was designed at the Aeronautical Research Institute and built at Kawasaki Kokuki Kogyo K.K. to investigate flying behaviour at very high speed. It featured a streamlined minimum cross-section fuselage fitted with a licence-built Daimler-Benz DB 601A engine. For short durations, power boost methanol/water injection was used and cooling was improved by a 45 kW (60 hp) turbine driven cooling fan for the radiators.

All-metal construction was used in combination with a small thin wing with a laminar flow profile and a sharp leading edge.

== Operational history ==
By the outbreak of the war, the whole project was taken over by the Imperial Japanese Army, who gave it the military type designation Ki-78. Kawasaki received the order to build two prototypes of the Ki-78, construction of which was started in September 1941. The first was completed more than a year later and was flown for the first time on 26 December 1942. A feasibility study to improve the Ki-78 flight performance showed that extensive airframe modifications were needed, and, consequently, the project was officially terminated after the 32nd flight on 11 January 1944; the second Ki-78 was never completed.

== Specifications (Ken III / Ki-78) ==
Data from Japanese Aircraft of the Pacific War

General characteristics

- Crew: 1
- Length: 8.1 m (26 ft 7 in)
- Wingspan: 8 m (26 ft 3 in)
- Height: 3.07 m (10 ft 1 in)
- Wing area: 11 m^{2} (120 sq ft)
- Empty weight: 1,930 kg (4,255 lb)
- Gross weight: 2,300 kg (5,071 lb)
- Powerplant: 1 × Daimler-Benz DB 601A V-12 inverted liquid-cooled piston engine rated at 1,160 kW (1,550 hp) with Water/Methanol injection for short durations

Performance

- Maximum speed: 700 km/h (430 mph, 380 kn) at 3,500 m (11,500 ft)
- Range: 600 km (370 mi, 320 nmi)
- Service ceiling: 8,000 m (26,000 ft)
- Wing loading: 209 kg/m^{2} (43 lb/sq ft)
- Power/mass: 0.373 kW/kg (0.2273 hp/lb)

== See also ==
Aircraft of comparable role, configuration, and era

- Napier-Heston Racer
- Messerschmitt Me 209
