= Kawasaki Army Type 92 Fighter =

Japanese fighter

KDA-5 (Type 92)
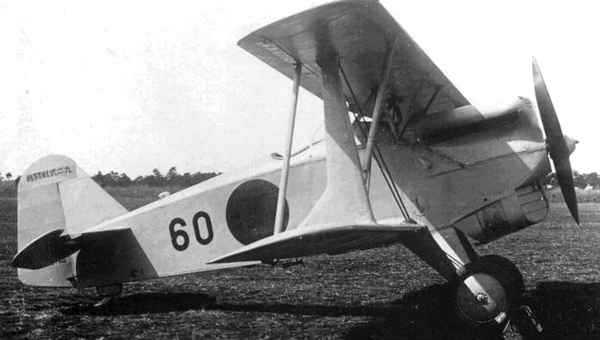

General information
- Type: Single-seat biplane fighter
- Manufacturer: Kawasaki Kōkūki Kōgyō K.K.
- Designer: Richard Vogt of Dornier
- Primary user: Imperial Japanese Army Air Force
- Number built: 385

History
- Introduction date: 1932
- First flight: 1930

The Kawasaki KDA-5 was a Japanese single-seat biplane fighter designed by the German Dr. Richard Vogt for the Imperial Japanese Army.

== Development ==
The KDA-5 was designed by Richard Vogt to meet a Japanese Army requirement for a fighter biplane. Five prototypes were built by Kawasaki Kōkūki Kōgyō K.K. and first flown in 1930. Following testing, the aircraft was ordered into production in 1932 as the Army Type 92 Model 1 Fighter. The aircraft had unequal-span sesquiplane wings and fixed tailwheel landing gear and was powered by a 470 kW (630 hp) BMW VI engine. After 180 aircraft were built, production continued with a structurally strengthened and more powerful Type 92 Model 2. A further 200 Model 2s were built.

== Operational history ==
Both versions saw action with the Imperial Japanese Army Air Force in Manchukuo (Manchuria), although it proved unpopular owing to its unstable take-off and landing behaviour and being difficult to maintain, particularly in cold weather. A few were still in service in 1941 as trainers.

== Variants ==
KDA-5
Five prototypes.
Type 92 Model 1 Fighter
Initial production variant with changed fin and rudder and fared headrest, 180 built.
Type 92 Model 2 Fighter
Improved version with structural strengthening and more powerful ( kW/750 hp) BMW VII engine, 200 built.

== Operators ==
Japan

- Imperial Japanese Army Air Force

== Specifications (92-I) ==
Data from The Illustrated Encyclopedia of Aircraft, The Complete Book of Fighters

General characteristics

- Crew: 1
- Length: 7.05 m (23 ft 1.5 in)
- Wingspan: 9.55 m (31 ft 4 in)
- Height: 3.10 m (10 ft 2 in)
- Wing area: 24.0 m^{2} (258 sq ft)
- Empty weight: 1,280 kg (2,822 lb)
- Gross weight: 1,700 kg (3,747 lb)
- Powerplant: 1 × BMW VI , 470 kW (630 hp)

Performance

- Maximum speed: 320 km/h (199 mph, 173 kn)
- Range: 850 km (528 mi, 459 nmi)

Armament

- 2 × 7.7 mm (0.303 in) machine guns (synchronised)
