= BMW VII =

BMW VIIa
- Type: V12 water-cooled piston engine
- National origin: Germany
- Manufacturer: Bayerische Motorenwerke
- First run: 1928
- Developed from: BMW VI
- Variants: BMW IX

The BMW VII was a water-cooled twelve-cylinder engine derived from the successful BMW VI. The engine was not as popular as the VI, due in no small part to the Great Depression, and only a small number were built. Experiments with supercharging led to the related BMW IX.

== Design and development ==
The main change from the VI to the VII was the addition of a 0.62 ratio propeller reduction gearing system, allowing the engine to run at higher RPM, and thus higher power settings, while still efficiently driving the same propellers. A more minor change was the movement of the magnetos from the back of the cylinder banks to the front, which allowed easier access for maintenance (similar changes to the original six-cylinder BMW V led to the BMW VIII). The crankcase was offered in aluminum alloy or Elektron.

== Operational history ==
The engine was first built in 1928 and passed its acceptance tests in June 1930. Only a few examples of the BMW VII went into operation, in the single-engined version of the Junkers Ju 52, for example, and in the Dornier Wal which Wolfgang von Gronau flew around the world in 1932. The VII was also used for forced-aspiration experiments with a "mixture blower" (a radial fan located behind the carburetor); this led in due course to the development of the BMW IX aircraft engine.

== Variants ==
Low compression
A low compression variant ran at 5.5:1 compression ratio, delivering 450 kW (600 hp) at 1,565 rpm
Medium compression
A medium compression variant ran at 6:1 compression ratio, delivering 560 kW (750 hp) at 1,650 rpm
BMW VIIaU
A high compression variant running at 7.3:1 compression ratio, delivering 560 kW (750 hp) for take-off.

== Specifications (variant) ==
Data from

=== General characteristics ===
- Type: V12 water-cooled piston engine
- Bore: 160 mm (6.30 in)
- Stroke: 190 / 199 mm (7.48 / 7.83 in) (nominal: master/slave connecting rods resulted in different stroke for each cylinder bank)
- Displacement: 46.93 L (2,864 cu in)
- Length: 2,025 mm (79.72 in)
- Width: 864 mm (34.02 in)
- Height: 1,045 mm (41.14 in)
- Dry weight: 525 kg (1,157 lb)

=== Components ===
- Fuel type: Aviation gasoline
- Oil system: pressure fed
- Cooling system: water-cooled
- Reduction gear: 0.62:1

=== Performance ===
- Power output: 450 or 560 kW (600 or 750 hp)
- Compression ratio: 5.5 / 6 / 7.3
