= List of aircraft engines used by the Imperial Japanese Army Air Service =

This is a list of aircraft engines used by the Imperial Japanese Army Air Force.

== Foreign aircraft engines ==
Engines acquired before the conflict, provided from Axis allies, or captured during the war.

- ADC Cirrus Hermes IV (130 hp)
- Allison V-1710-39 (1,150 hp)
- Argus As 10C (240 hp)
- Argus As 109-014 (300 kg thrust)
- Armstrong Siddeley Jaguar IVC (400 hp)
- BMW VI (750 hp)
- BMW IX (500-800 hp)
- BMW 132E (660 hp)
- BMW 132K (900 hp)
- BMW 801D-2 (1,700 hp)
- BMW 801E (1,900 hp)
- BMW 109-003E-1 (800 kg thrust)
- BMW 109-003E-2 (800 kg thrust)
- Bramo 323R-2 Fafnir (1,200 hp)
- Bristol Jupiter VI (390 hp)
- Bristol Jupiter VII (500 hp)
- Bristol Mercury VIS2 (640 hp)
- Daimler-Benz DB 600G (960 hp)
- Daimler-Benz DB601 Modified Water Cooled Engine (1,550 hp)
- Daimler-Benz DB 601Aa (1,175 hp)
- Daimler Benz DB 601F (1,350 hp)
- Fiat A.80 R.C.41 (1,000 hp)
- Hirth HM 504A-2 (105 hp)
- Hirth HM 508H (240 hp)
- Hispano-Suiza 12Xcrs (690 hp)
- Junkers Jumo 205C-4 (660 hp)
- Junkers Jumo 210C (600 hp)
- Junkers Jumo 210Ca (640 hp)
- Junkers Jumo 210G (700 hp)
- Junkers Jumo 210Ea (680 hp)
- Junkers L5 (280 hp)
- Klimov M-103 (960 hp)
- Klimov M-105PF (1,210 hp)
- Lorraine-Dietrich 12Eb (450 hp)
- Lorraine 12Hfrs Petrel (780 hp)
- Lorraine 12Hgrs Petrel (780 hp)
- Menasco L-365-1 (125 hp)
- Pratt & Whitney R-1690-C (600 hp)
- Pratt & Whitney R-1830-92 (1,200 hp)
- Pratt & Whitney R-2800-10 of (2,000 hp)
- Rolls-Royce Kestrel V (608 hp)
- Shvetsov M-25V (750 hp)
- Shvetsov M-62 (1,000 hp)
- Shvetsov M-62R (1,000 hp)
- Wright SGR-1820-F52 (760 hp)
- Wright R-1820-102 (900 hp)
- Wright R-1820-G2 Cyclone (850 hp)
- Wright R-1820-G3B (900 hp)
- Wright R-1820 Cyclone 9 (1,200 hp)
- Wright R-1820-40 (1,200 hp)
- Wright R-1820-44 (1,000 hp)
- Wright SGR-1820-F52 (760 hp)
- Wright R-3350-23 Cyclone 18 (2,000 hp)

== Japanese aero-engine designations ==
Manufacturer	Army exp.	Army long	Navy exp.	Navy Name	Manuf desig.	Unified	Notes
Nakajima	Ha-1	Army Type 97 650hp Air-cooled Radial		Kotobuki (寿, longevity)	AH		License-built Bristol Jupiter
Mitsubishi	Ha-2	Army Type 93 700hp Water Cooled In-line					
Nakajima	Ha-5	Army Type 97 825hp Air Cooled Radial			NAL		
Mitsubishi	Ha-6		MK1	Shinten (震天, progress)	A6(7)		14 cyl. radial
Nakajima	Ha-8	Army Type 94 550hp Air Cooled Radial		Hikari (光, light)	NAP		
Kawasaki	Ha-9	Army Type 98 850hp Liquid Cooled In-line					License-built BMW VI
Hitachi	Ha-12	Army Type 95 150hp Air Cooled Radial					
Hitachi	Ha-13	Army Type 95 350hp Air Cooled Radial					
Hitachi	Ha-13a	Army Type 98 450hp Air Cooled Radial					
Nakajima	Ha-25	Army Type 99 975hp Air Cooled Radial / Army Type 99 950hp Air Cooled Radial	NK1B/C	Sakae (栄, prosperity)	NAM	Ha-35	
Mitsubishi	Ha-26	Army Type 99 900hp Air Cooled Radial	MK2	Zuisei (瑞星, holy star)	A14	Ha-31	
Hitachi	Ha-38						600 hp 9-cyl radial
Nakajima	Ha-39						
Kawasaki	Ha-40	Army Type 2 1,100hp Liquid Cooled In-line				Ha-60	License built Daimler DB601A
Nakajima	Ha-41	Army Type 100 1,250hp Air Cooled Radial	NK5			Ha-34	
Hitachi	Ha-42						9-cyl radial
Nakajima	Ha-45	Army Type 4 1,900 hp Air-cooled Radial	NK9	Homare (誉, honour / praise)	NBA	Ha-45	
Hitachi	Ha-47	Army Type 4 110hp Air Cooled Inline	GK4	Hatsukaze (初風, fresh wind)		Ha-11	License-built Hirth HM 504
Mitsubishi	Ha-101	Army Type 100 1,450hp Air Cooled Radial	MK4	Kasei (火星, Mars)	A10	Ha-32	
Mitsubishi	Ha-102	Army Type 100 1,050hp Air Cooled Radial	MK2	Zuisei (瑞星, holy star)	A14	Ha-31	
Nakajima	Ha-103		NK7A	Mamoru (護, protector)	NAK	Ha-36	
Mitsubishi	Ha-104	Army Type 4 1,900hp Air Cooled Radial				Ha-42	18-cylinder version of Ha-101
Nakajima	Ha-105						
Nakajima	Ha-109	Army Type 2 1,450hp Air Cooled Radial	NK5			Ha-34	
Mitsubishi	Ha-111	Army Type 100 1,450hp Air Cooled Radial	MK4	Kasei (火星, Mars)	A10	Ha-32	
Mitsubishi	Ha-112	Army Type 4 1,500hp Air Cooled Radial	MK8	Kinsei (金星, Venus)	A8	Ha-33	Pratt & Whitney R-1690 Hornet development
Nakajima	Ha-115	Army Type 1 1,150hp Air Cooled Radial	NK1F	Sakae (栄, prosperity)			
Nakajima	Ha-117				BD	Ha-47	
Mitsubishi	Ha-118		MK11A				
Kawasaki	Ha-140						liquid-cooled V-12
Nakajima	Ha-145						
Kawasaki	Ha-201					Ha-72	coupled Ha-40 engines
Mitsubishi	Ha-211		MK9		A20	Ha-43	
Mitsubishi	Ha-214		MK10				
Nakajima	Ha-219		NK11A		BH	Ha-44	
Nakajima	Ha-315						
Nakajima	Ha-505				D-BH	Ha-54	projected 5,000 hp 36-cyl radial engine
Aichi			AE1		Atsuta		license-built Daimler DB 601A
Aichi						Ha-70	Coupled Atsuta engines
Hiro		Hiro Type 14 500 hp Water Cooled W-12			Type 14		
Hiro		Hiro Type 90 600 hp Water Cooled W-12			Type 90		500 hp W-12 (Lorraine 12F Courlis development)
Hiro		Hiro Type 91 520 hp Water Cooled W-12			Type 91		500 hp W-12 (Lorraine 12Eb development)
Hiro		Hiro Type 94 900 hp Liquid Cooled In-line			Type 94		
Hitachi / Gasuden				breeze (端風, Hatakaze)			
Hitachi / Gasuden				encampment wind (陣 風, Jimpu)			150 - 160 hp 7 cyl. radial
Hitachi / Gasuden					divine wind (神風, Kamikaze)		160 hp 7-cyl. radial
Hitachi			GK2	heavenly wind (天風, Amakaze) / heavenly father (天父, Tempu)			
Hitachi						Ha-23	4-cyl inverted in-line
Ishikawajima Shibauru Turbine Company / Yokosuka (Kugisho)					Ne-20		turbojet
Ishikawajima Shibauru Turbine Company					Ne-30		turbojet
Ishikawajima Shibauru Turbine Company					Ne-130		turbojet
Kawasaki		Army Type 95 800hp Liquid Cooled In-line					liquid-cooled V-12 (BMW VI)
Maru Industries					Ka10		license-built Argus As 014 pulsejet
Mitsubishi					A2		320 hp
Mitsubishi					A4		760 hp
Mitsubishi					A9		
Mitsubishi		Army Type 92 400hp Air Cooled Radial			A5	Ha-33	
Mitsubishi					Ne-330		turbojet
Mitsubishi					Tokuro-1 Ro.1		
Mitsubishi		Army Type 3 Rocket	KR10		Tokuro-2 Ro.2		license-built Walter HWK 509
Mitsubishi		Army Type 2 Rocket			Tokuro-3 Ro.3		
					Ne-12		turbojet
Nakajima - Hitachi					Ne-230		turbojet
Ishikawajima					Tsu-11		Motorjet
		Navy Type 4 Model 1 solid fuel rocket					
Kobe					Argus As 10		

== See also ==
- Japanese aircraft engine identification systems
- List of aircraft engines
