= Japanese aircraft engine identification systems =

Japanese aero-engines for military aircraft were given a wide variety of designations depending on the customer. This led to much confusion, particularly among the Allied forces, where a single engine type could have up to six different designations. This situation emerged because of the almost total lack of co-operation in weapons procurement between the IJAAS (大日本帝國陸軍航空隊 - Dai-Nippon Teikoku Rikugun Kokutai - Imperial Japanese Army Air Service) and the IJNAS (大日本帝國海軍航空隊 - Dai-Nippon Teikoku Kaigun Koukuu-tai - Imperial Japanese Navy Air Service).

Engines could have designations in any or all of these designation systems:

Army Hatsudoki experimental designation
(Kawasaki Ha40)
Army long designation
(e.g. Army Type 99 900hp Air Cooled Radial)
Navy experimental designation
(Nakajima NK9B)
Navy Name designation
( Nakajima Homare 11)
Manufacturers designation
(Nakajima NBA)
Unified system introduced by the Ministry of Munitions in April 1942
(Kawasaki Ha-60)

Data from:Japanese Aircraft 1910–1941 & Japanese Aircraft of the Pacific War & Japanese Aircraft Engines

== Army Hatsudoki system ==
Experimental engines for Army aircraft were given ハ Ha – (エンジン - Hatsudoki) numbers whilst under design and testing. The Army Ha numbers had no intrinsic meaning and were only sequentially allocated. Sub types could be identified by suffixes -kai, -ko etc., or -I, -II etc.. e.g.:Nakajima Ha115

== Army long designation system ==
Once an engine had been accepted for service in Army aircraft it was given a long designation which denoted the year of introduction, power, cooling method and layout:

e.g.:Army Type 100 1,450hp Air Cooled Radial – (Nakajima Ha111) The two or three digit Type number denoted the Japanese Imperial year (皇紀, kōki) that the engine was introduced, identical to the Type numbers used in Japanese aircraft long designations from 1925 (From 1927 to 1930 the Type number sometimes denoted the Shōwa or Taisho year ):

After the Type number the power of the engine was denoted in horsepower:

- 1250 hp

After the power designator the type of engine was denoted:

- Air-cooled Radial

Sub-types were designated by suffixes.

- Model 1

== Navy experimental designation ==
The IJNAS introduced a designation system for experimental engines and those under development / test before production. Once the engine entered service this designation was replaced by the name or unified system. Formed from four character groups the IJNAS experimental designation system consisted of e.g. Nakajima NK9B

First character for manufacturer
A - Aichi
G - Hitachi
I - Ishikawajima
K - Kawasaki
M - Mitsubishi
N - Nakajima
Y – Naval Air Technical Arsenal (Yokosuka and Hiro)
Second Character for engine attributes
K - Air cooled
E - Liquid Cooled
D - Diesel
Third Character for the design number
Fourth Character for the revision code
A - first revision
B - second revision, and so on.

== Navy name designation ==
The simplest of all the systems the IJNAS allocated name characters to engines combined with Model and revision numbers, introduced to reduce confusion and also to reduce the intelligence value of the designation to enemies. e.g. Nakajima Homare 11 - (praise" or, more usually, "honour (誉, Homare))

== Manufacturers designation ==
Some engines were never allocated a designation or there is no record of such. In which case they are usually identified by the manufacturers designation. e.g. Mitsubishi A4

== Unified IJAAS / IJNAS designation system ==
From 1942 the Ministry of Munitions in Japan instituted a Unified aero-engine designation system in an attempt to reduce confusion caused by previous systems. The new system prefixed engine designations with ハ Ha – (エンジン - Hatsudoki) followed by code numbers identifying each engine in terms of layout, no of cylinders, cooling method and sub-series model numbers.

Thus the Mitsubishi Ha-33-62 金星 Kinsei

- Mitsubishi - manufacturer
- ハ Ha (エンジン Hatsudoki) - engine.
- 3 - air-cooled 14-cylinder double-row radial engine.
- 3 - 140 mm bore, 150 mm stroke.
- 62 - 60 series engine, second revision.
- 金星 Kinsei - name

Each engine designation in this system started with the Hatsudoki short hand character, represented by Ha in English, followed by two numbers classifying the engine:

The first digit represented the engine classification:

1. Air-cooled inline engine.
2. Air-cooled single-row radial engine.
3. Air-cooled 14-cylinder double-row radial engine.
4. Air-cooled 18-cylinder double-row radial engine.
5. Air-cooled, more than 18-cylinders, multi-row radial engine.
6. Liquid-cooled 12-cylinder engine.
7. Liquid-cooled, more than 12-cylinders engine.
8. Diesel engine.
9. Special engine.

The second digit represented the bore and stroke of the engine:

1. 130/160
2. 140/130
3. 150/170
4. 140/150
5. 140/160
6. 130/150

After the classification digits a two digit number gave the model number and revision state.

Model numbers were given as:

- 00 – baseline Model, usually prototypes
- 10
- 20
- 30
- 40
- 50
- 60

etc.etc.

A revision (or modification) state number replaced the second digit of the model number:

- 10 – Model 10 baseline version
- 11 – Model 10 revision 1
- 12 – Model 10 revision 2
- 23 – Model 20 revision 3
- 62 – Model 60 revision 2

Coincidentally one engine was assigned the same numerical designation in the IJAAS and joint designation systems; Nakajima Ha-45 Homare.

== Calendars and Type numbers ==
Data from:

Gregorian calendar year	Type number (Army and Navy)	Imperial Japanese Calendar Year	Nengo Calendrical era	Navy exp.Shisaku number
1921	Type 10 (Taisho)	2581	Taisho 10	
1922	Type 11 (Taisho)	2582	Taisho 11	
1923	Type 12 (Taisho)	2583	Taisho 12	
1924	Type 13 (Taisho)	2584	Taisho 13	
1925	Type 14 (Taisho)	2585	Taisho 14	
25/12/1926	Type 15 (Taisho)	25/12/2586	Taisho 15	
26/12/1926		26/12/2586	Showa 1	
1927	Type 87	2587	Showa 2	
1928	Type 88	2588	Showa 3	
1929	Type 89	2589	Showa 4	
1930	Type 90	2590	Showa 5	
1931	Type 91	2591	Showa 6	6-Shi
1932	Type 92	2592	Showa 7	7-Shi
1933	Type 93	2593	Showa 8	8-Shi
1934	Type 94	2594	Showa 9	9-Shi
1935	Type 95	2595	Showa 10	10-Shi
1936	Type 96	2596	Showa 11	11-Shi
1937	Type 97	2597	Showa 12	12-Shi
1938	Type 98	2598	Showa 13	13-Shi
1939	Type 99	2599	Showa 14	14-Shi
1940	Type 100 / Type 0	2600	Showa 15	15-Shi
1941	Type 1	2601	Showa 16	16-Shi
1942	Type 2	2602	Showa 17	17-Shi
1943	Type 3	2603	Showa 18	18-Shi
1944	Type 4	2604	Showa 19	19-Shi
1945	Type 5	2605	Showa 20	20-Shi

== Table of Japanese aero-engine designations ==
Manufacturer	Army exp.	Army long	Navy exp.	Navy Name	Manuf desig.	Unified	Notes
Nakajima	Ha1	Army Type 97 650hp Air-cooled Radial		longevity (寿, Kotobuki)	AH		
Nakajima					NZ		110 kW (150 hp) 7-cylinder radial
Mitsubishi	Ha2	Army Type 93 700hp Water Cooled In-line					
Nakajima	Ha5	Army Type 97 825hp Air Cooled Radial					
Mitsubishi	Ha6		MK1	heavens name (震天, Shinten)	A6(7)		14 cyl. radial
Nakajima	Ha8	Army Type 94 550hp Air Cooled Radial					
Kawasaki	Ha9	Army Type 98 850hp Liquid Cooled In-line					liquid-cooled V-12 (BMW VI)
Hitachi	Ha12	Army Type 95 150hp Air Cooled Radial		encampment wind (陣 風, Jimpu)			
Hitachi	Ha13	Army Type 95 350hp Air Cooled Radial		encampment wind (陣 風, Jimpu)			
Hitachi	Ha13a	Army Type 98 450hp Air Cooled Radial		encampment wind (陣 風, Jimpu)			
Nakajima	Ha20			light (光, Hikari)			
Lorraine-Dietrich					Lorraine 1		IJN designation for imported Lorraine-Dietrich 12D V-12 engines
Lorraine-Dietrich					Lorraine 2		IJN designation for imported Lorraine-Dietrich 12Eb W-12 engines
Lorraine-Dietrich					Lorraine 3		IJN designation for imported geared Lorraine-Dietrich 12Eb W-12 engines
Nakajima	Ha25	Army Type 99 975hp Air Cooled Radial / Army Type 99 950hp Air Cooled Radial	NK1	prosperity (栄, Sakae)		Ha-35	
Mitsubishi	Ha26	Army Type 99 900hp Air Cooled Radial	MK2	holy star (瑞星, Zuisei)	A14	Ha-31	
Hitachi	Ha38						600 hp 9-cyl radial
Nakajima	Ha39						
Kawasaki	Ha40	Army Type 2 1,100hp Liquid Cooled In-line				Ha-60	liquid-cooled V-12
Nakajima	Ha41	Army Type 100 1,250hp Air Cooled Radial					
Hitachi	Ha42						9-cyl radial
Nakajima	Ha45	Army Type 4 1,900 hp Air-cooled Radial	NK9	honour / praise (誉, Homare)	NBA	Ha-45	
Hitachi	Ha47	Army Type 4 110hp Air Cooled Inline	GK4	fresh wind (初風, Hatsukaze)			
Nakajima	Ha51			22cyl Homare		Ha-51	Air-Cooled 22-Cylinder 2-Row Radial
Yokosuka Naval Air Arsenal	Ha73			Ken No. 3	YE2		W-18
Yokosuka Naval Air Arsenal	Ha74				YE3 (Ken No. 1)		2,500 (or 3,200) shp horizontal X-24 liquid-cooled engine, known as Yokosuka Naval Air Arsenal YE3B (Ha 74 Model 01) or YE3E (Ha 74 Model 11)
Mitsubishi	Ha101	Army Type 100 1,450hp Air Cooled Radial	MK4	Mars (火星, Kasei)	A10	Ha-32	
Mitsubishi	Ha102	Army Type 100 1,050hp Air Cooled Radial	MK2	holy star (瑞星, Zuisei)	A14	Ha-31	
Nakajima	Ha103		NK7	protector (護, Mamoru)	NAK	Ha-36	
Mitsubishi	Ha104	Army Type 4 1,900hp Air Cooled Radial					
Nakajima	Ha105						
Nakajima	Ha109	Army Type 2 1,450hp Air Cooled Radial				Ha-34	
Mitsubishi	Ha111	Army Type 100 1,450hp Air Cooled Radial	MK4	Mars (火星, Kasei)	A10	Ha-32	
Mitsubishi	Ha112	Army Type 4 1,500hp Air Cooled Radial	MK8	golden star (金星, Kinsei)	A8	Ha-33	
Nakajima	Ha115	Army Type 1 1,150 Air Cooled Radial					
Nakajima	Ha117						
Kawasaki	Ha140						liquid-cooled V-12
Nakajima	Ha145						
Kawasaki	Ha201					Ha-72	liquid-cooled inverted V-24
Mitsubishi	Ha211		MK9			Ha-43	
Mitsubishi	Ha214						
Nakajima	Ha217					Ha-46	
Nakajima	Ha219					Ha-43	
Nakajima	Ha315						
Nakajima	Ha505			36 cyl Kotobuki		Ha-54-01	projected 5,000 hp Air-Cooled 36-Cylinder 4-Row Radial
Aichi			Aichi AE1		Aichi Atsuta		
Aichi			Aichi Type 91				W-12 water-cooled 500–650 hp (370–480 kW)
Aichi						Ha-70	Coupled Atsuta 30 engines
Hiro		Hiro Type 14 620 hp					
Hiro		Hiro Type 90 600 hp water-cooled W-12					500 hp W-12 (Lorraine 12F Courlis development)
Hiro		Hiro Type 91 520 hp water-cooled W-12					500 hp W-12 (Lorraine 12Eb development)
Hiro		Type 94 900 hp liquid-cooled in-line					40 degree angle W-18
Hitachi / Gasuden				breeze (端風, Hatakaze)			
Hitachi / Gasuden				divine wind (神風, Kamikaze)			160 hp 7-cyl. radial
Hitachi			GK2	heavenly wind (天風, Amakaze) / heavenly father (天父, Tempu)			
Hitachi						Ha-23	4-cyl inverted in-line
Ishikawajima Shibauru Turbine Company / Yokosuka (Kugisho)					Ishikawajima Ne-20 (Japanese: 石川島 ネ-20)		turbojet
Ishikawajima Shibauru Turbine Company					Ne-30		turbojet
Ishikawajima Shibauru Turbine Company					Ne-130		turbojet
Kawasaki		Army Type 95 800hp Liquid Cooled In-line					liquid-cooled V-12 (BMW VI)
Maru Industries					Maru Ka-10		pulse-jet
Mitsubishi					A2		320 hp
Mitsubishi					A4		760 hp
Mitsubishi					A9		
Mitsubishi		Army Type 92 400hp Air Cooled Radial			A5		
Mitsubishi			MK10				
Mitsubishi					Ne-330		turbojet
Nakajima			NK11				
Mitsubishi					Mitsubishi Tokuro-1 Ro.1		
Mitsubishi		Army Type3 Rocket	KR10		Mitsubishi Tokuro-2 Ro.2		Walter HWK 109-509
Mitsubishi		Army Type 2 Rocket			Mitsubishi Tokuro-3 Ro.3		
					Ne-12		turbojet
Nakajima - Hitachi					Ne-230		turbojet
					Tsu-11		Thermojet
		Navy Type 4 Model 1 solid fuel rocket					
Kobe					Argus As 10		
	Ka-10				Argus As 109-014		Pulsejet

== See also ==
- Japanese military aircraft designation systems
- British military aircraft designation systems
- List of RLM aircraft designations for the Third Reich
- Mark (designation)
- Type (designation)
- World War II Allied names for Japanese aircraft

== Bibliography ==
- Mikesh, Robert; Shorzoe Abe (1990). Japanese Aircraft 1910–1941. london: Putnam. ISBN 978-0-85177-840-2.
- Francillon, Rene (1979). Japanese Aircraft of the Pacific War. London: Putnam & Company Limited. ISBN 0-370-30251-6.
- Mawhinney, Robert. Japanese Aircraft Engines. Washington D.C.: NASM. Archived from the original on 2013-11-03.
