= Aichi Atsuta =

Japanese WWII aircraft engine

Atsuta
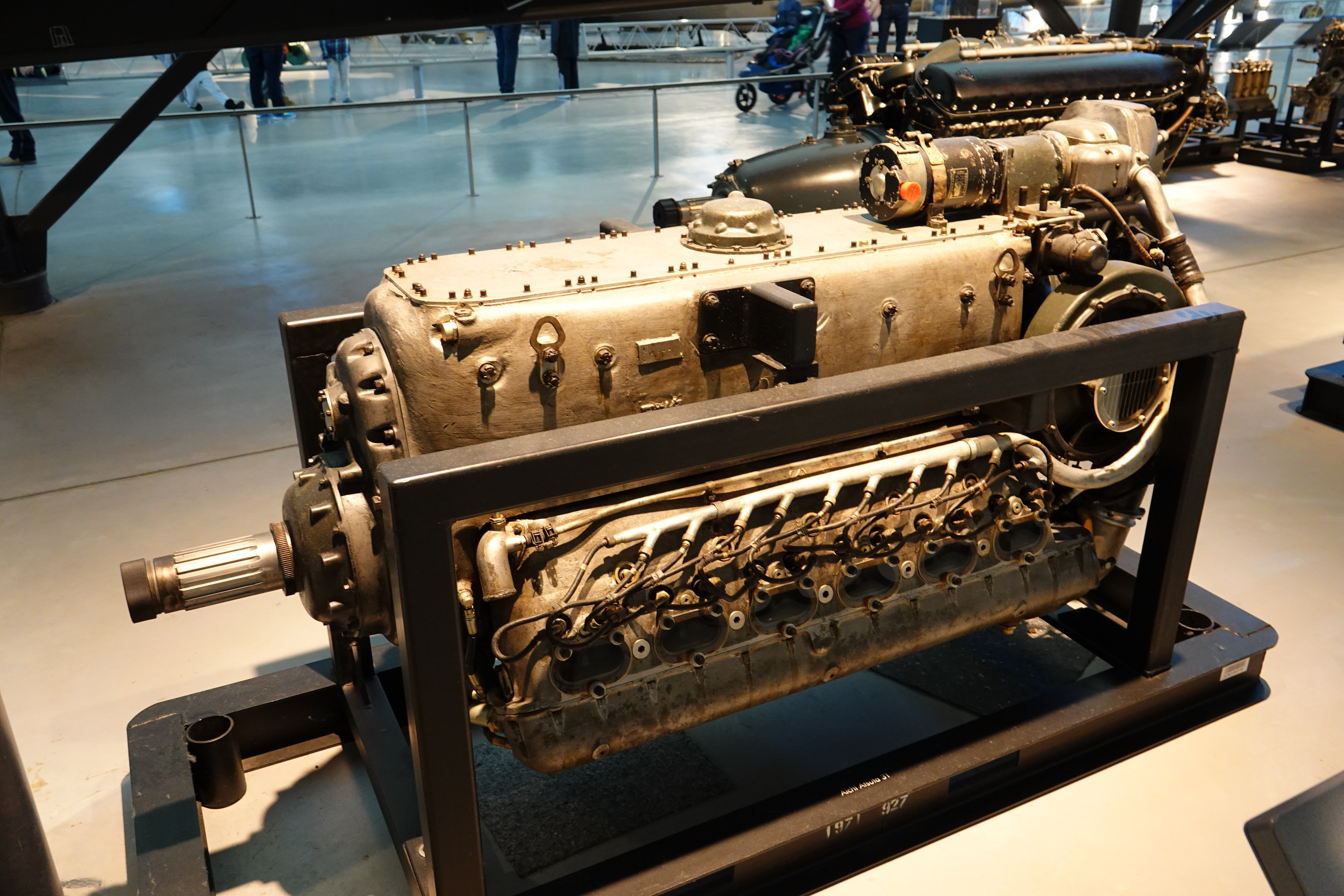
- Aichi Atsuta, a license-built DB 601
- Type: Piston V12 aircraft engine
- National origin: Japan
- Manufacturer: Aichi Kokuki
- First run: 1942
- Major applications: Yokosuka D4Y; Aichi M6A
- Developed from: Daimler-Benz DB 601
- Developed into: Aichi Ha-70

The Aichi AE1A Atsuta (Japanese: アツタ or 熱田) was a Japanese licensed version of the German Daimler-Benz DB 601A 12-cylinder liquid-cooled inverted-vee aircraft engine. The Atsuta powered only two models of Imperial Japanese Navy Air Service (IJNAS) aircraft in World War II. The Imperial Japanese Army Air Service (IJAAS) used the same engine (manufactured by Kawasaki as the Kawasaki Ha40) to power its Kawasaki Ki-61 Hien (Allied reporting name "Tony") fighter. The IJNAS's Atsuta and its IJAAS cousin, the Ha-40 were based on the engine that powered Germany's Messerschmitt Bf 109E fighter.

== Design and development ==
=== Aichi receives Daimler-Benz DB 600 license ===
Daimler-Benz granted Aichi Kokuki KK, a part of the Aichi Clock and Electric Co. (Aichi Tokei Denki KK), a license to manufacture the DB 600A through D models in November, 1936. At that time the Aichi Aircraft Company was building only the Nakajima Kotobuki 9-cylinder air-cooled radial engine at its Atsuta Engine Plant, located in south central Nagoya. It was necessary to re-tool the factory for the production of the new Daimler-Benz engine. Two DB 600 engines were imported that year and three the next, all to be used as production patterns.

=== Experimental status ===
It was the Imperial Japanese Navy's common practice to use a coded designation while an engine was in experimental or pre-production status. This engine was coded "AE1A", which decodes as: A=Aichi Tokei Denki KK, E=Liquid-cooled, 1=Aichi's first liquid-cooled engine model, and A=first version of that engine model.

== Aichi receives Daimler-Benz DB 601A license ==
By early 1938 the Japanese Navy had also acquired the German He 118 V4 two-seat dive bomber aircraft, along with its production rights. This aircraft was powered by the DB 601A. The Heinkel's spectacular performance impressed the IJN Naval Staff so much that the design of the Yokosuka D4Y Suisei (Allied reporting name "Judy") carrier based dive bomber evolved from it.

By 1939, eleven of the more advanced model DB 601A engines were imported. Manufacturing rights were updated for Aichi and granted to Kawasaki to build this model. The new engine received AE1P as its experimental designation.

=== DB 601A becomes the Atsuta model 32 ===
When the AE1P design was accepted, Aichi's version became the Atsuta 32 and Kawasaki's version became the Ha-40, which was to be used in IJAAS's Kawasaki Ki-61 Hien (Allied reporting name "Tony") fighter.

The Atsuta 12 rated at 1200 hp was chosen to power the Yokosuka D4Y1 when it went into production. The D4Y2 was powered by the 1400 hp Atsuta 32 when it became available. The success of both airplanes was attributed to the slender lines of the high powered liquid-cooled engine.

=== Aichi M6A gets the Atsuta engine ===
A new top-secret aircraft that was to be transported and launched from a large submarine was ordered by the IJN in the spring of 1942 as the 17-Shi Special Attack Bomber. That aircraft became the Aichi M6A Seiran (Shisei-Seiran), along with its M6A1-K Ninzan (Shisei-Seiran Kai) land-based trainer version.

Four preproduction M6A aircraft were completed, a firsthand account stating that one had a 1,200 hp Atsuta 12 engine, while the others three had Atsuta 32's. The first aircraft's engine was later changed to an Atsuta 32.

Eighteen M6A1 Special Attack Bomber versions followed, and these had the Atsuta 32 engine as well. Lastly, two of the original M6A1 prototypes were converted into M6A1-K Nanzan land-based training aircraft.

== Engine production ==
Aichi manufactured 873 Atsuta series engines during World War II. These were shared between the twenty-two M6A1/M6A1-K and all D4Y1/2 aircraft. Peak production of the Atsuta 32 engine was in May, 1944, when 107 engines were produced.

=== Production problems ===
A serious problem with the Aichi and Kawasaki version of the Daimler-Benz engine was that of holding a close tolerance fit between the crankshaft and its bearings on this fairly long engine. The result was that the engine proved to be prone to crankshaft failure. Additionally, there was often great difficulty obtaining engine components which, along with repeated air attacks on the Atsuta engine plant, eventually brought engine production to a standstill.

=== Atsuta production ends ===
Maintenance difficulties with the Atsuta and Ha-40 engines eventually led to the installation of the more reliable Mitsubishi Kinsei 62 radial engine for the Yokosuka D4Y3 Model 33, and the Mitsubishi Ha-112 radial air-cooled engine for the IJAAS's Kawasaki Ki-61, which then became known as the Kawasaki Ki-100. Such a modification was not possible for the Aichi M6A1 Seiran as it could only use the liquid-cooled inverted-vee type engine, in order to fit into I-400-class submarine's confined hangar, becoming the only Japanese airplane that retained the inverted-vee engine installation through to the end of the war.

== Evaluation by ATSC ==
Postwar evaluation by the US Air Technical Service Command's Foreign Aircraft Evaluation Centre for the Air Force (located at Wright Field and Freeman Army Airfield) found the Atsuta engine's standard of workmanship was not as good as that of the Army's Kawasaki Ha-40, and far worse than Mitsubishi and Nakajima.

== Variants and designations ==
=== IJNAS engine naming method ===
It was the Imperial Japanese Navy's common practice to refer to its engines by name, while the Imperial Japanese Army referred to its engines by their engine (Japanese:Hatsudoki abbreviated Ha) model number. Ha numbers were assigned in sequence as the engine design was accepted.

The Japanese method of identifying model numbers of aircraft engines is unique in that the model number always has two digits and may be followed by one or more letters. The first digit represents the major version of the engine and the second number represents the minor version of that model engine. The model number follows the name (IJNAS engines) or the Ha number (IJAAF engines).

The first model number assigned to an engine is always 11, meaning the first major design and first minor version of that design. A major change to the design increments the first number and resets the second number to one. A minor change to the engine model increments the second number by one. If a very minor change is made, suffix letters are added after the model number.

=== Engine accepted by IJN ===
When the AE1A engine was accepted by the IJNAS, its coded designation was dropped and it was named after the Atsuta factory where the engine was manufactured.

The first production engine was the Atsuta 12 rated at 1200 hp. The model number 12 indicates this was the first model with one minor change.

=== Variants ===
Under the Japanese unified designation system introduced around 1942-3 the Ha is separated from the number by a hyphen which is absent under the IJAAS system.

Aichi AE1
Initial IJNAS experimental designation for the Atsuta 11.
Aichi AE1A
IJNAS experimental designation for the Atsuta 12.
Aichi AE1P
IJNAS experimental designation for the Atsuta 32.
Aichi Atsuta
IJNAS designation for Kawasaki produced engines to AE1P standard.
Aichi Ha-70
(Unified designation) Coupled Atsutas 30 for the Yokosuka R2Y.

== Specifications ==
Data from The First Naval Technical Arsenal.

=== General characteristics ===
- Type: Twelve-cylinder liquid-cooled supercharged 60° inverted Vee aircraft piston engine
- Bore: 150 mm (5.91 in)
- Stroke: 160 mm (6.30 in)
- Displacement: 33.93 L (2,071 in^{3})
- Length: 215 cm (84.65 in)
- Width: 71.2 cm (28.03 in)
- Height: 106 cm (41.73 in)
- Dry weight: 715 kg (1,576 lb)

=== Components ===
- Valvetrain: Two intake and two sodium-cooled exhaust valves per cylinder actuated via a single overhead camshaft per cylinder block.
- Supercharger: Gear-driven single-speed centrifugal type supercharger
- Fuel system: Direct fuel injection
- Oil system: Dry sump with one pressure and two scavenge pumps
- Cooling system: Liquid-cooled
- Reduction gear: 0.532:1 (AE1A); 0.4:1 (AE1P)

=== Performance ===
- Power output:
- Takeoff: At sea level:1,419 PS (1,400 hp; 1,044 kW) at 2,800 rpm
- Cruise:
  - At 1,700 m (5,600 feet): 1,270 PS; 930 kW (1,250 hp) at 2,600 rpm (AE1A); At 1,360 PS; 1,000 kW (1,340 hp) at 2,600 rpm (AE1P)
  - At 5,000 m (16,000 feet): 1,310 PS; 960 kW (1,290 hp) at 2,600 rpm (AE1A)
- Compression ratio: 7.2:1 (AE1A); 7.5:1 (AE1P)

== See also ==
Related development

- Daimler-Benz DB 600
- Daimler-Benz DB 601
- Kawasaki Ha40

Comparable engines

- Allison V-1710
- Junkers Jumo 211
- Klimov VK-107
- Mikulin AM-37
- Packard V-1650 Merlin
- Rolls-Royce Merlin

Related lists

- List of aircraft engines
- List of aircraft engines used by the Imperial Japanese Army Air Service
