= Kawasaki Ha40 =

12-cylinder, inverted-V aircraft engine

Ha40
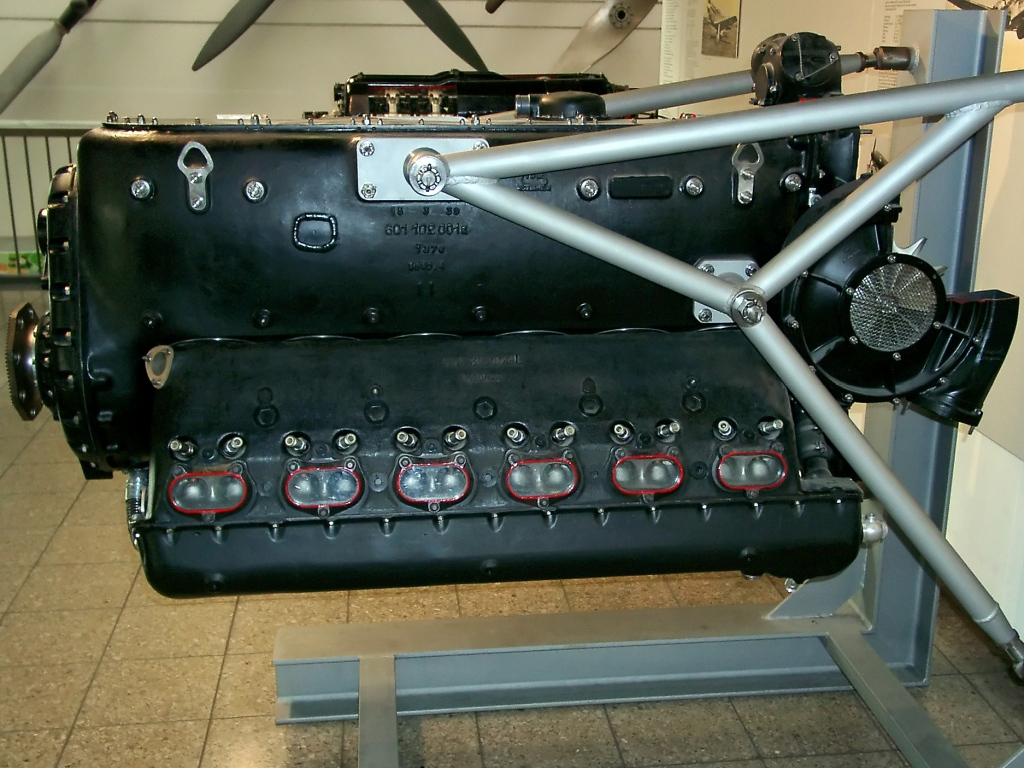
- Preserved Daimler-Benz DB 601.
- Type: Piston V12 aircraft engine
- National origin: Japan
- Manufacturer: Kawasaki
- First run: 1930s
- Major applications: Kawasaki Ki-61
- Developed from: Daimler-Benz DB 601

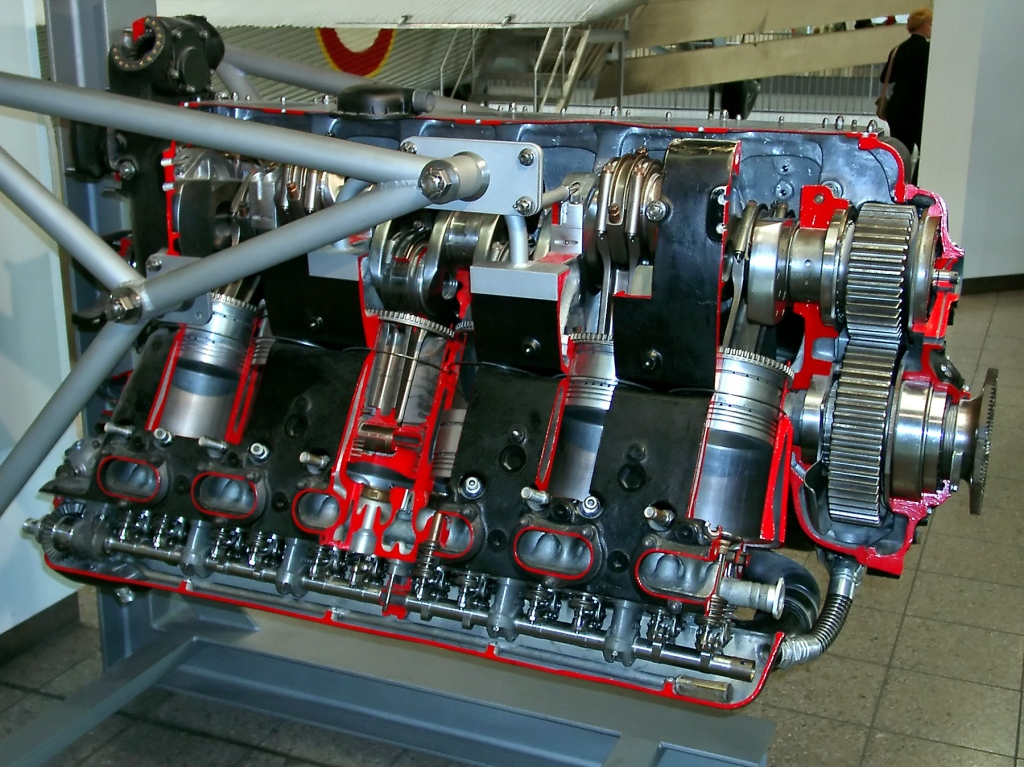
DB 601A, partially sectioned (right side)

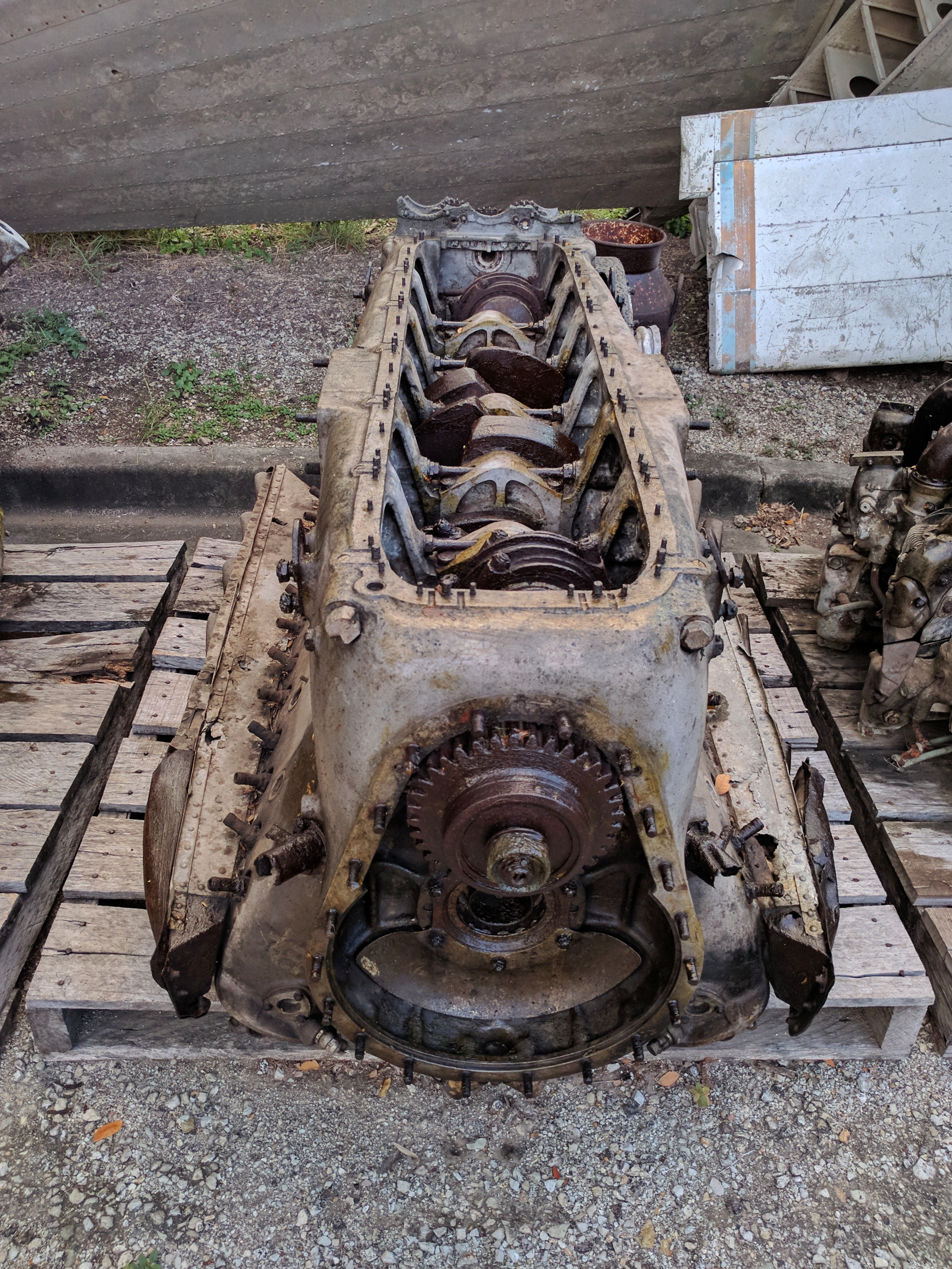
Ha40 at the National Museum and Art Gallery, Port Moresby.

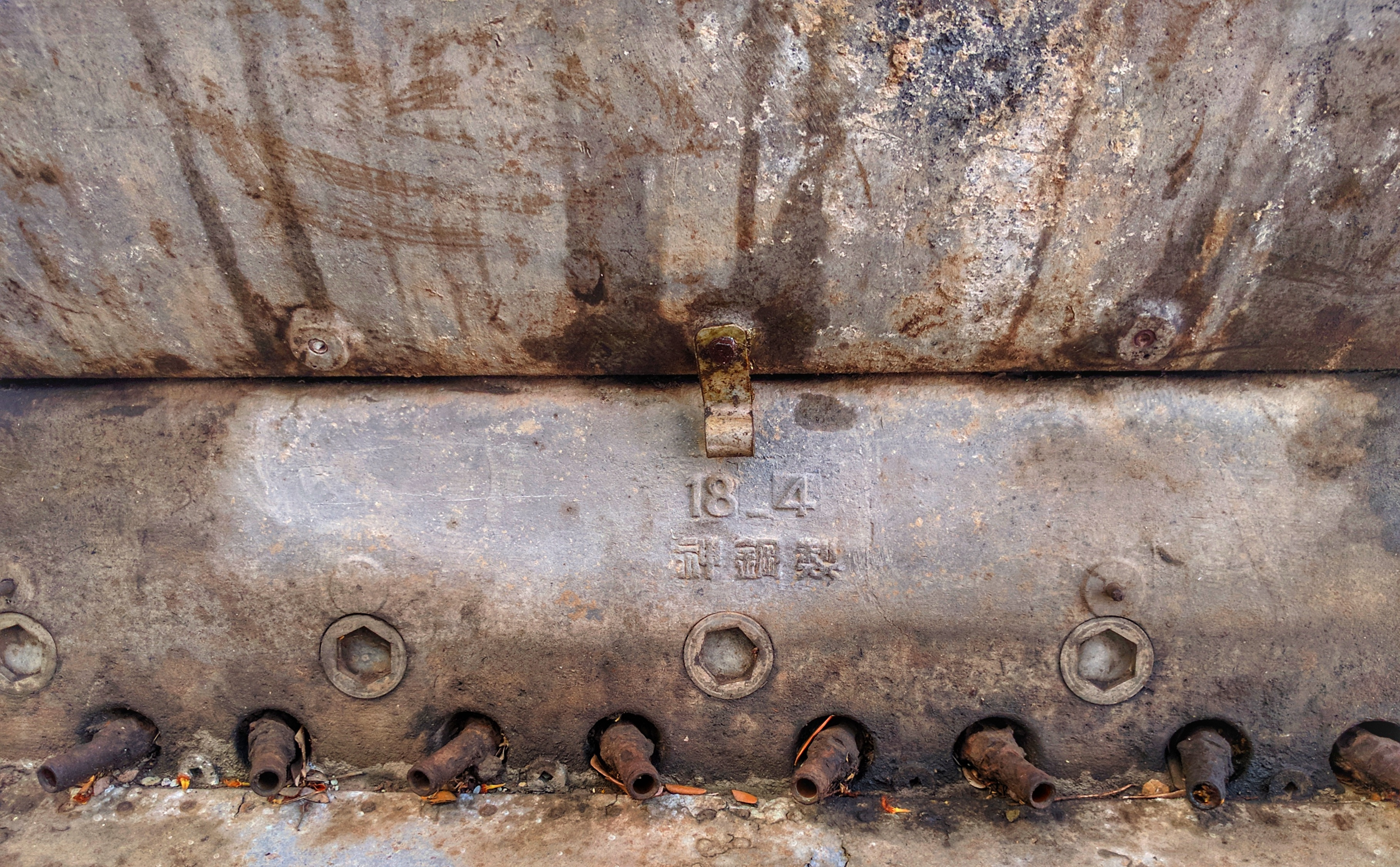
Ha40 detail, National Museum and Art Gallery, Port Moresby.

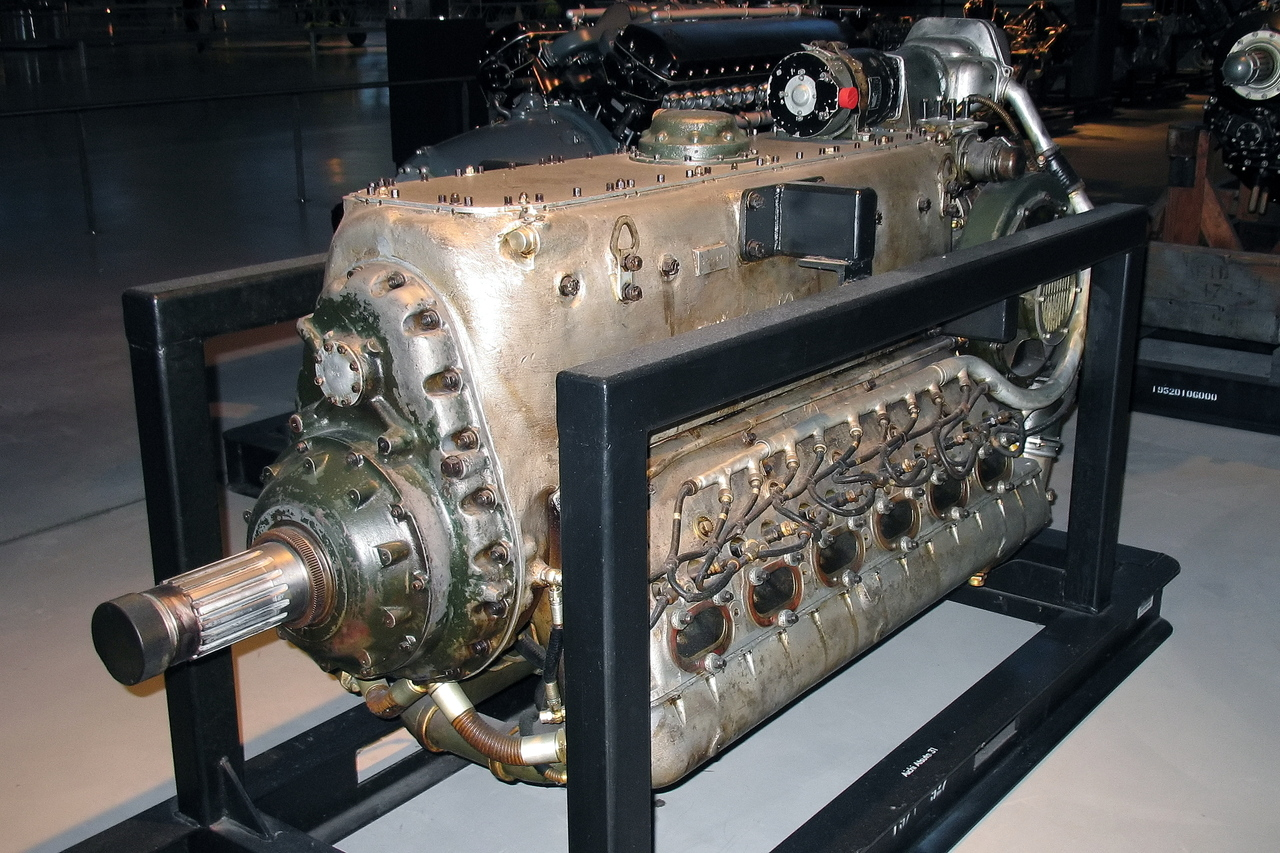
Aichi Atsuta, a license-built DB 601 (left side)

The Kawasaki Ha40, also known as the Army Type 2 1,100 hp Liquid Cooled In-line and Ha-60, was a license-built Daimler-Benz DB 601Aa 12-cylinder liquid-cooled inverted-vee aircraft engine. The Imperial Japanese Army Air Service (IJAAS) selected the engine to power its Kawasaki Ki-61 fighter.

== Design and development ==
The Daimler-Benz DB 601Aa was a development of the earlier DB 600, with direct fuel injection replacing the carburetor. Like all DB 601s, it had a 33.9-litre displacement. The first prototype with the direct fuel injection was test run in 1935, and an order for 150 engines was placed in February 1937.

A manufacturing license was granted to Aichi for the production of this engine for the Imperial Japanese Navy as the Atsuta and to Kawasaki for production of this engine for the IJAAS as the Ha40. Under the 1944 Unified System, this engine was re-designated as the Kawasaki Ha-60.

The Kawasaki Ha40 and the Aichi Atsuta were based on the engine that powered Germany's Messerschmitt Bf 109 fighter.

=== Ha201 ===
A new high-horsepower narrow-profile engine was required for the Kawasaki Ki-64 experimental fighter. The aircraft design called for a narrow-profile fuselage, and the solution that Kawasaki developed was the Ha-201 engine. Although similar to the Aichi Ha-70, where two Aichi Atsuta engines, mounted side-by-side behind the cockpit driving a single large propeller — an arrangement already used by the Daimler-Benz DB 606 that powered the Heinkel He 119 reconnaissance monoplane prototypes, and later inspired Japan's own Yokosuka R2Y reconnaissance aircraft from the seventh and eighth He 119 prototypes being sold to Japan in May 1940 — for the Japanese Ki-64, its own powerplant installation design called for the two Kawasaki Ha-40 engines to be separately mounted, one in the aircraft's nose, the other behind the cockpit.

The engines were connected to a common gearbox that was mounted in the nose. The rear engine was connected to the nose-mounted gearbox by a long drive shaft similar to the American Bell P-39 Airacobra. The gearbox did not combine the power output of the two engines. Instead, the rear engine drove the forward controllable-pitch propeller, while the front engine independently drove the rearward fixed-pitch propeller.

== Variants ==
Ha40
Up to 1,175 PS (864 kW; 1,159 hp) at sea level with 2,500 rpm, up to 1,100 PS (809 kW; 1,085 hp) at 2,400 rpm and 3,700 m (12,100 ft) altitude. Used in the Kawasaki Ki-61.
Ha-60
Unified designation for the Ha40
Ha140
An up-rated 1,500 PS development of the Ha40 for the high-altitude Kawasaki Ki-61-II KAI interceptor aircraft.
Ha201
Two Ha40 coupled together with a common gearbox, driving a twin three-blade contra-rotating propeller. Used in the Kawasaki Ki-64. The combination was rated at 2,350 PS (1,728 kW; 2,318 hp) at sea level and 2,500 rpm, up to 2,200 PS (1,618 kW; 2,170 hp) at 2,400 rpm and 3,700 m altitude.
Ha-72
Unified designation of the Ha201, coupled Ha40

== Applications ==
Ha40

- Kawasaki Ki-61

Ha201

- Kawasaki Ki-64

== Specifications (Ha40) ==
Data from Francillon, p.119

=== General characteristics ===
- Type: Twelve-cylinder liquid-cooled supercharged 60° inverted Vee aircraft piston engine
- Bore: 150 mm (5.91 in)
- Stroke: 160 mm (6.30 in)
- Displacement: 33.93 L (2,070.5 in³)
- Length: 1,722 mm (68 in)
- Dry weight: 590 kg (1,320 lb)

=== Components ===
- Valvetrain: Two intake and two sodium-cooled exhaust valves per cylinder actuated via a single overhead camshaft per cylinder block.
- Supercharger: Gear-driven single-speed centrifugal type supercharger)
- Fuel system: Direct fuel injection
- Oil system: Dry sump with one pressure and two scavenge pumps
- Cooling system: Liquid-cooled

=== Performance ===
- Power output:
- 865 kW (1,175 PS or 1,159 hp) at 2,500 rpm for takeoff
- 787 kW (1,070 PS or 1,050 hp) at 2,400 rpm at 3,700 m (12,140 ft)
- Specific power: 25.52 kW/L (0.56 hp/in³)
- Compression ratio: 6.9:1
- Specific fuel consumption: 270 g/(kW·h) (0.44 lb/(hp·h))
- Power-to-weight ratio: 1.47 kW/kg (0.89 hp/lb)

== See also ==
Related development

- Daimler-Benz DB 600
- Daimler-Benz DB 601
- Aichi Atsuta

Comparable engines

- Allison V-1710
- Continental I-1430
- Hispano-Suiza 12Y
- Junkers Jumo 211
- Klimov M-105
- Mikulin AM-35
- Rolls-Royce Merlin

Related lists

- List of aircraft engines
