= Aichi Ha-70 =

Ha-70
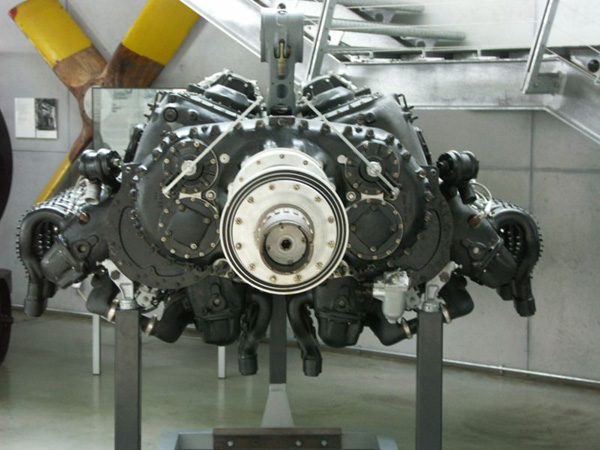
- DB 610 gearbox end, showing same two-engine arrangement
- Type: Piston X 2 inverted V12 aircraft engines
- National origin: Japan
- Manufacturer: Aichi Kokuki
- First run: 1945
- Major applications: Yokosuka R2Y
- Developed from: Aichi Atsuta

The Aichi Ha-70 was a compound engine composed of two 1,700 hp 12-cylinder liquid-cooled inverted V-12 Aichi Atsuta aircraft engines mounted to a common gearbox. The only aircraft powered by the Ha-70 was the Yokosuka R2Y, an Imperial Japanese Navy Air Service (IJNAS) prototype reconnaissance aircraft that was designed and built near the end of World War II.

== Design and development ==
In common with Daimler-Benz, Aichi Kokuki KK joined two Aichi Atsuta engines to drive a single propeller through a combining gearbox in very similar fashion to the Daimler Benz DB 606 (two Daimler-Benz DB 601 engines coupled to a gearbox),

The Yokosuka R2Y prototype reconnaissance aircraft required a new engine of 3,400 hp (2,535 kW) and after studying the Daimler-Benz DB 606A-2 engine that powered the Heinkel He 119 single-engine reconnaissance bomber, Aichi determined that the required horsepower could be attained by coupling two Atsuta engines with a common gearbox. To obtain the required power the Atsuta would require up-rating by at least 300 hp (224 kW) horsepower; Aichi continued to improve the Atsuta 32, eventually extracting the required 1,700 hp (1,268 kW)

The two inverted Vee Atsuta engines were mounted side-by-side, each rotated outboard from the centre-line so that the inner banks were upright, with sufficient room between them for the exhaust manifolds. The engines were attached to a gearbox that combined the two separate engine drives into a single output shaft.

== Application ==
Fitted to the R2Y the Ha-70 was mounted behind the pilot, requiring a long drive shaft to drive the nose-mounted gear box that mounted the six-bladed propeller.

== Specifications ==
Data from The First Naval Technical Arsenal, August 22, 1945

=== General characteristics ===
- Type: Two coupled twelve-cylinder liquid-cooled supercharged 60° inverted Vee aircraft piston engines
- Bore: 150 mm (5.91 in)
- Stroke: 160 mm (6.30 in)
- Displacement: 33.93 L (2,070.5 in^{3}) each, 67.86 L (4141 in^{3}) total

=== Components ===
- Valvetrain: Two intake and two sodium-cooled exhaust valves per cylinder actuated via a single overhead camshaft per cylinder block.
- Supercharger: Gear-driven single-speed centrifugal type supercharger
- Fuel system: Direct fuel injection
- Oil system: Dry sump with one pressure and two scavenge pumps
- Cooling system: Liquid-cooled

=== Performance ===
- Power output: Takeoff: 2,500 kW (3,350 horsepower)

== See also ==
Comparable engines

- Allison V-3420
- Daimler-Benz DB 610

Related lists

- List of aircraft engines
- List of aircraft engines in use by Japan during World War II
- List of Aircraft engines used by Japanese Navy Air Service
