= Messerschmitt Me 261 =

German reconnaissance aircraft prototype

Me 261 Adolfine
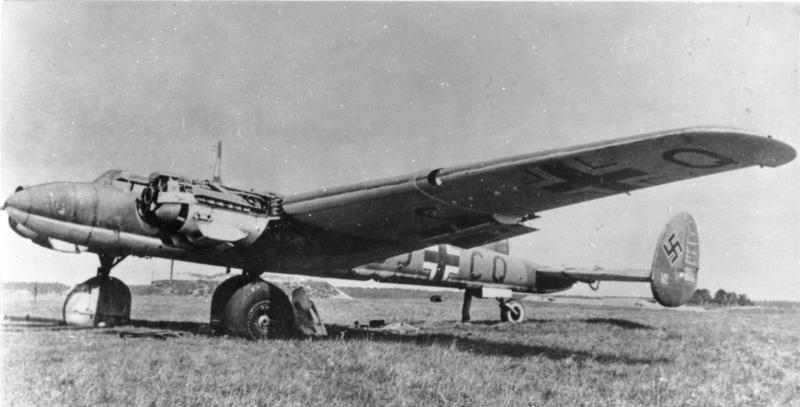
- Messerschmitt Me 261 V2, BJ+CQ, in Lechfeld, 1944, following damage in an air raid

General information
- Type: Long-range reconnaissance
- Manufacturer: Messerschmitt
- Primary user: Luftwaffe
- Number built: 3

History
- Introduction date: Never introduced
- First flight: 23 December 1940

The Messerschmitt Me 261 (unofficially nicknamed Adolfine) was a long-range reconnaissance aircraft designed in the late 1930s. It looked like an enlarged version of the Messerschmitt Bf 110. It was not put into production; just three Me 261s were built and used primarily for testing and development purposes.

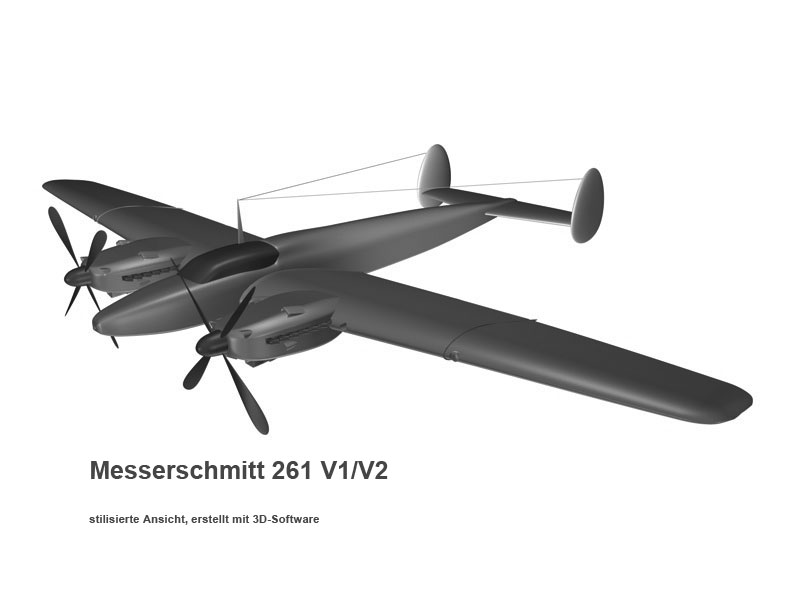
3D-model of the Me 261

== Design and development ==
In 1937, Messerschmitt began Projekt P. 1064, a study for a long-range reconnaissance aircraft, and took the design of the Bf 110 twin-engine heavy fighter (and derivative Bf 161 reconnaissance / Bf 162 light bomber projects) as its basis. The P. 1064 had a long, slim fuselage with two wing-mounted engines. The aircraft was planned from the outset as a record-breaking aircraft, but after becoming convinced that the aircraft was capable of taking the world long-distance flight record, the German Air Ministry (Reichsluftfahrtministerium) approved the project and gave it the airframe designation number of 8-261.

The intended goal of the project was for an example of the aircraft to carry the Olympic flame from Garmisch-Partenkirchen, Germany (site of the 1936 Winter Olympics) to Tokyo, Japan for the 1940 Summer Olympics in what would be a record-breaking nonstop flight (5870 mi / 9445 km). The plan captured the imagination of Adolf Hitler at an early stage in its design and in tribute, the aircraft carried the unofficial name: Adolfine.

The Me 261 incorporated a number of features which were highly advanced for its day. The single-spar all-metal wing was designed to serve as a fuel tank and its depth at the wing root was only slightly less than the height of the fuselage. The fuselage was of virtually rectangular section with space for five crew members, consisting of two pilots seated side-by-side with the radio operator directly behind in the front compartment, while a navigator and a flight engineer were housed in the rear fuselage under a stepped, glazed station.

Power came from four Daimler-Benz DB 601 engines, coupled together in pairs in a "power system" known as the DB 606, weighing 1.5 tonnes apiece and debuting in February 1937. The DB 606 "power systems" were originally developed for both the "single"-engined Heinkel He 119 high-speed reconnaissance aircraft, and the Heinkel He 177 strategic bomber, but the Me 261's design housed the DB 606 "power systems" in nacelles that afforded significantly better access for maintenance and ventilation of the "twinned" DB 601 component engines in each one, than the Heinkel heavy bomber possessed. Each pair of engines drove a variable-pitch propeller, intended to be a pair of counter-rotating propellers (as the He 177A had used for its fourth prototype onwards) with each four-blade propeller driven through a gearbox shared between the "twinned" DB 601 engines forming the "power system", generating 2,700 PS (1,985 kW) each.

The Me 261 had a conventional landing gear with unusually large and bulky low-pressure tires, much like modern day aircraft tundra tires, which prevented the aircraft from becoming bogged down on rough grass landing strips. The main gear's design appears to use main struts that rotated through 90° during their rearwards retraction sequence, with sizable main wheels resting atop the retracted struts (similar to those used on production examples of the contemporary Junkers Ju 88). Even the Me 261's fully retractable tailwheel possessed a larger-than-average, low-pressure pneumatic tire.

== Operational history ==
Construction of three prototypes began at Messerschmitt's Augsburg works during the spring of 1939, but progress was slow due to the realisation that war would probably soon break out and the 1940 Summer Olympics would be cancelled. The Me 261's original design brief as a long-range reconnaissance aircraft had been forgotten; now viewed as non-strategic, it was nearly abandoned with all work stopping in August 1939.

The Air Ministry subsequently realised that the Me 261 could still be a useful vehicle for evaluating long-range operations, and work resumed in the summer of 1940.

Me 261 V1

The first flight of the Me 261 V1 was on 23 December 1940, flown by Messerschmitt's test pilot Karl Baur. Willy Messerschmitt wrote to Ernst Udet in early 1941 with the results of the first flight, predicting a range of over 20,000 km (12,000 mi) for the type. The decision to use the DB 606 engine was a problem because only a few were available for development projects, as most were needed for types already in production such as the Heinkel He 177. The Me 261 V1 was badly damaged during an Allied bombing attack on the Lechfeld Air Base in 1944 and eventually scrapped.

Me 261 V2

The first flight of the Me 261 V2 was in early 1941. Official thinking now saw the Me 261 as a long-range maritime reconnaissance aircraft. Messerschmitt had realised that the fuel-carrying nature of the aircraft's wings ruled out fitting armaments to them, and so both prototypes were tested for endurance through to 1943. There was a suggestion that one or both be used to drop propaganda leaflets on New York City, but nothing came of the idea before the aircraft were destroyed. The Me 261 V2 was damaged during the same Allied bombing attack as the V1 and like it was later scrapped.

Me 261 V3

The V3 differed from its predecessors in having two of the June 1940-debuted, DB 610 "power system" engines (which used two DB 605s each, instead of the paired 601s) and room for two additional crew members. The first flight of the Me 261 V3 was in early 1943; this aircraft had the longest series of flight tests. On 16 April 1943, the Me 261 V3 was flown by Karl Baur over a distance of 4,500 km (2,800 mi) in an elapsed time of 10 hours, setting an unofficial endurance record which could not be confirmed due to war conditions. In July 1943, the Me 261 V3's hydraulics failed on landing and the port undercarriage leg collapsed. The V3 was transported to Oranienburg for repairs, and after that used on a few long-range missions for the Luftwaffe's reconnaissance division. Its ultimate fate is unknown.

== Specifications (Me 261 V3) ==
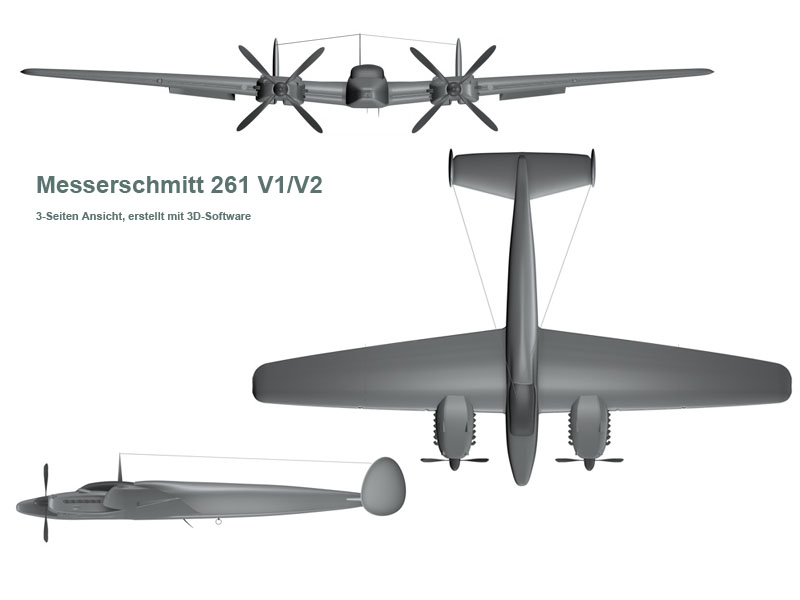
3D computer generated view of the Me 261 from the top, front and left sides

Data from Warplanes of the Third Reich

General characteristics

- Crew: 7
- Length: 16.68 m (54 ft 9 in)
- Wingspan: 26.86 m (88 ft 1 in)
- Height: 4.71 m (15 ft 5 in)
- Wing area: 76 m^{2} (820 sq ft)
- Powerplant: 2 × Daimler-Benz DB 610A/B 24-cylinder paired V-12 liquid-cooled piston engines 2,900 PS (2,900 hp; 2,100 kW)
- Propellers: 4-bladed constant-speed propellers

Performance

- Maximum speed: 620 km/h (390 mph, 330 kn) at 3,000 m (9,800 ft)
- Range: 11,024 km (6,850 mi, 5,952 nmi)
- Service ceiling: 8,260 m (27,100 ft)

== See also ==
Aircraft of comparable role, configuration, and era

- Henschel Hs 130
- Hughes XF-11
- Tachikawa Ki-74
- Tachikawa Ki-77

Related lists

- List of aircraft of World War II

== Bibliography ==
- Green, William. Warplanes of the Third Reich. London: Macdonald & Co. Ltd., 1970. ISBN 0-356-02382-6
- Gunston, Bill and Tony Wood. Hitler's Luftwaffe. London: Salamander Books Ltd., 1977. ISBN 978-0-517-18771-5.
- Philpott, Bryan. The Encyclopedia of the German Military Aircraft. London: Bison Books, 1980. ISBN 0-85368-447-2.
- Smith, J. Richard. Messerschmitt: An Aircraft Album. New York: Arco Publishing, 1971. ISBN 978-0-668-02505-8.
- Wagner, Ray and Nowarra, Heinz. German Combat Planes: A Comprehensive Survey and History of the Development of German Military Aircraft from 1914 to 1945. New York: Doubleday, 1971.
