= Messerschmitt Me 509 =

German fighter project

Me 509
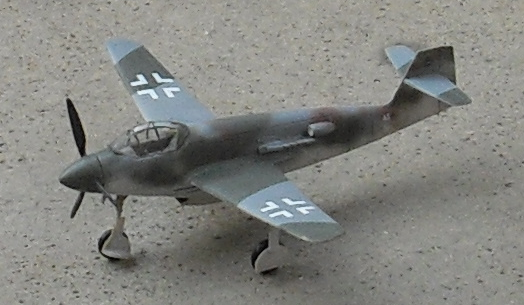
- Model of the Me 509

General information
- Type: Fighter aircraft
- Manufacturer: Messerschmitt
- Status: Unrealised project

The Messerschmitt Me 509 was an all-metal fighter project, underway in Germany during World War II.

== Development ==
Not much information about this project has survived. It was based on the Me 309 but with the engine located behind a pressurized cockpit, much in a similar manner to the US Bell P-39 Airacobra.

The engine was a Daimler-Benz DB 605B driving a three-blade propeller, and armament was to consist of two 13 mm (.51 in) MG 131 machine guns and two 20 mm MG 151/20 cannon. The tricycle landing gear from the Me 309 was retained, which worked better on the 509, due to the lower weight on the nosewheel - the Me 309's nosegear had collapsed during trials. The smaller nose would have improved visibility. The project was cancelled along with the Me 309, but the Japanese made a similar aircraft, the Yokosuka R2Y Keiun, which suffered from engine overheating.

== Specifications (as designed) ==
Data from

General characteristics

- Crew: 1
- Length: 9.94 m (32 ft 7 in)
- Wingspan: 11.27 m (37 ft 0 in)
- Height: 3.98 m (13 ft 1 in)
- Powerplant: 1 × Daimler-Benz DB 605B v-12 inverted liquid-cooled piston engine, 1,085 kW (1,455 hp)
- Propellers: 3-bladed constant-speed propeller

Performance

- Maximum speed: 760 km/h (470 mph, 410 kn)

Armament

- Guns:

- 2× 13 mm (0.512 in) MG 131 machine guns
- 2× 20 mm (0.787 in) MG 151/20 cannon

== See also ==
Aircraft of comparable role, configuration, and era

- P-39 Airacobra
- P-63 Kingcobra
- Yokosuka R2Y
- Koolhoven F.K.55
