= Mitsubishi Ki-15 =

1936 Japanese reconnaissance aircraft

Ki-15 "Karigane"
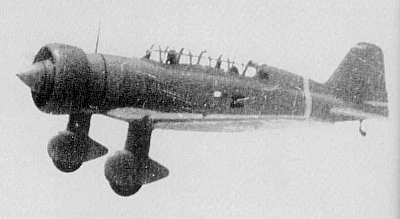
- Mitsubishi Ki-15-I (Army Type 97 Command Reconnaissance aircraft)

General information
- Type: Military reconnaissance aircraft, light bomber
- Manufacturer: Mitsubishi Heavy Industries
- Primary users: Imperial Japanese Army Air Force Imperial Japanese Navy Air Service
- Number built: approx. 500

History
- Introduction date: May 1937
- First flight: May 1936
- Retired: 1945 (Japan); 1951 (China)

The Mitsubishi Ki-15 "Karigane" (雁, Wild goose), Army Type 97 Command Reconnaissance aircraft (九七式司令部偵察機, Kyunana-shiki sireibu teisatsuki) was a Japanese reconnaissance aircraft and a light attack bomber of the Second Sino-Japanese War and Pacific War. It began as a fast civilian mail-plane. It was a single-engine, low-wing, cantilever monoplane with a fixed tailwheel undercarriage; it carried a crew of two. It served with both the Imperial Japanese Army and Navy (as the C5M). During World War II it was code-named "Babs" by the Allies.

== Design and development ==
The Ki-15 was designed by the Mitsubishi corporation to meet an Imperial Japanese Army Air Force requirement of 1935 for a two-seat, high-speed reconnaissance aircraft. The resulting aircraft was a low-wing cantilever monoplane with a fixed, spatted undercarriage, similar to other all-metal stressed-skin monoplanes developed elsewhere in 1930s, such as the Heinkel He 70 and the Northrop Alpha. Power was by a single Nakajima Ha-8 radial engine, giving 560 kW (750 hp) at 4,000 m (13,120 ft). The first prototype flew in May 1936, with testing proving successful, the aircraft meeting all performance requirements, reaching a speed of 481 km/h (299 mph) and showing good handling characteristics.

Service testing was completed without difficulty and the type was ordered into production under the official designation Army Type 97 Command Reconnaissance Aircraft Model 1. In May 1937, a year after the first flight, delivery of the first of 437 production aircraft to the army began.

== Operational history ==
The Ki-15-I was almost immediately placed into operational service at the beginning of the war with China in 1937. The aircraft proved useful in the early period of the Second Sino-Japanese War and performed missions deep into Chinese strategic rear areas, as far as reaching Lanzhou, and in particular serving as pre-strike guide and post-strike observation during the years-long Battle of Chongqing-Chengdu. Its high speed gave it a distinct advantage until the Chinese Air Force acquired Soviet-made Polikarpov I-16 Type 17 fighters; a Ki-15 was shot down along with three bombers by I-16 Type 17 fighters of the 24th PS, 4th PG over Liangshan Airbase on 20 May 1940. It was used for level bombing, close support and photo reconnaissance before being eventually replaced by the Mitsubishi Ki-30.

Plans were already in hand to improve the Ki-15-I, and in September 1939 the Ki-15-II was put into production with the 671 kW (900 hp) Mitsubishi Ha-26-1; the smaller diameter of this both reduced drag and overcame one of the major shortcomings of the initial version: poor forward field of view past the large-diameter of the initial Nakajima Kotobuki engine. The improved version entered production in September 1939 as the Ki-15-II.

The Japanese Navy, impressed by the performance of this aircraft, ordered 20 examples of the Ki-15-II under the designation “Navy Type 98 Reconnaissance Aircraft Model 1," or Mitsubishi designation C5M1, even before the Army. The Navy subsequently acquired 30 C5M2 aircraft which had an even more powerful 708 kW (949 hp) Nakajima Sakae 12 engine. They were used for reconnaissance duties. In further development, the army also experimented with an even more powerful engine with 783 kW (1,050 hp) Mitsubishi Ha-102 radial in the Ki-15-III which did not enter production.

When production ended, approximately 500 examples of all versions of the Ki-15 had been built, the majority in front-line service when the Pacific War began. By 1943, the Ki-15 had been relegated to second-line roles, but numbers were expended in kamikaze attacks in the closing stages of World War II.

=== World record flight to Europe and other civilian use ===
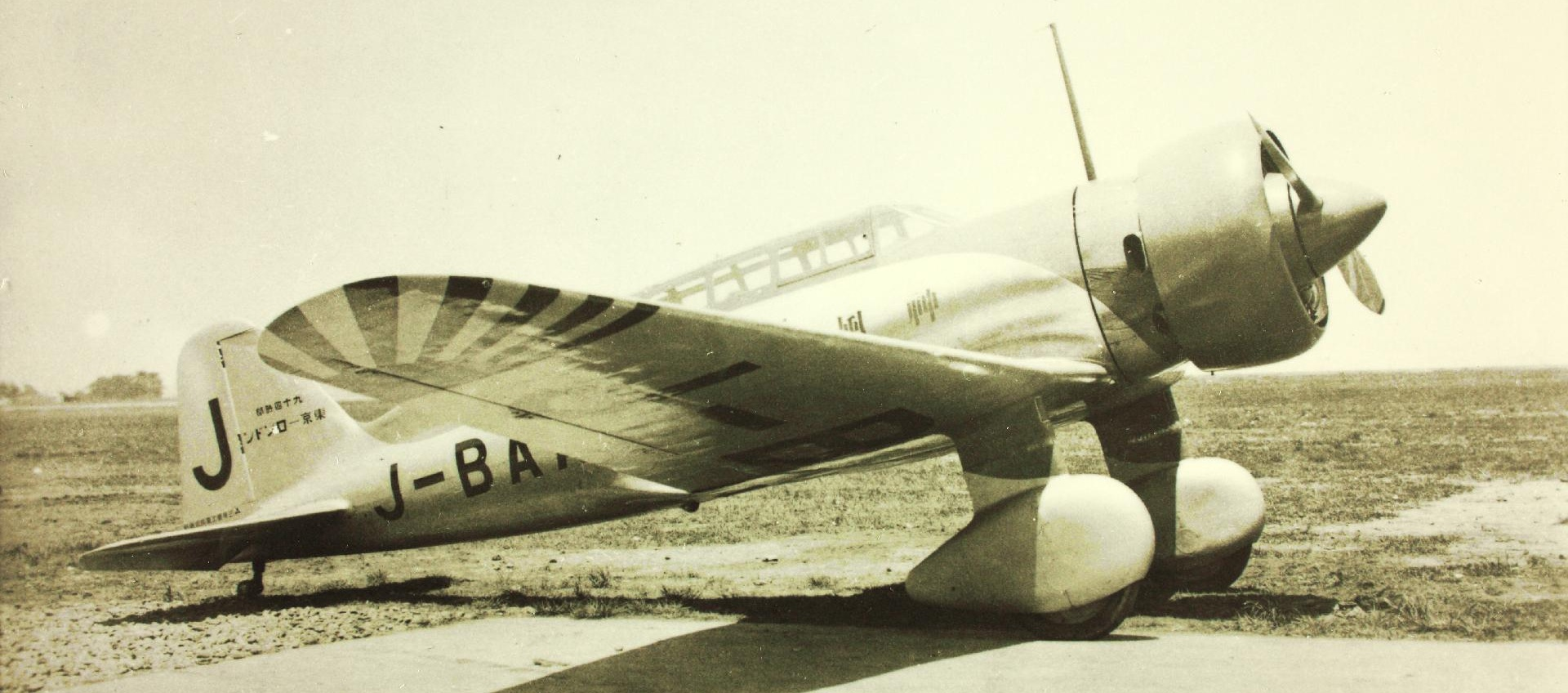
Mitsubishi Ki-15 Karigane, (registration J-BAAI) was sponsored by the Asahi Shimbun newspaper

Despite the relatively weak engine (by later standards) and fixed undercarriage, the Ki-15 was remarkably fast. During the initial flight testing, the newspaper Asahi Shimbun obtained permission to purchase the second prototype. The aircraft was given the designation Karigane ('wild goose'), flying on 19 March 1937, being named Kamikaze and registered as J-BAAI.

It was the first Japanese-built airplane to fly to Europe and caused a sensation in 1937 by making the flight between Tokyo and London, for the coronation of King George VI and Queen Elizabeth, between 6 April 1937 and 9 April 1937 in a flight time of 51 hours, 17 minutes and 23 seconds, a world record at the time. Following the success of the Japan-England flight, a small number of Ki-15s were sold to civil customers. One of the early production aircraft was named "Asakaze" (J-BAAL) and was also used by the Asahi Shimbun; others were used by various civilian operators as mail-planes.

== Variants ==
- Karigane I : Prototype version for civilian use
- Ki-15-I (Army Type 97 Command Reconnaissance Aircraft Model 1) : Initial production variant for the Japanese Army, with Nakajima Ha-8 (Army Type 94) 640 hp at take-off, 900 hp at 11,810 ft (3,600 m)
- Ki-15-II (Army Type 97 Command Reconnaissance Model 2) : Improved Army production version with smaller but more powerful 14-cylinder Mitsubishi Ha-25-I (Army Type 99 Model 1) engine, with 850 hp at take-off and 900 hp (670 kW) at 3,600 m (11,810 ft). This gave an increased maximum speed of 317 mph at 14,205 ft (510 km/h at 4,300 m), roughly comparable with fighters like Hawker Hurricane or the Nakajima Ki-43 Hayabusa. Rate of climb was even more improved: 16,400 ft (5,000 m) in 6 min 49 seconds, and was achieved despite the increase in weight (empty, normal, max: 3,510 vs 3,084 lb, normal 4,826 vs 4,482 and max 5,470 vs 5,071 lb). Maiden flight was in June 1938 and production started in September 1939
- Ki-15-III : Proposed upgraded version; did not enter production. It had the Mitsubishi Ha-102 engine (1,080 hp (810 kW) at take-off, 1,055 hp (787 kW) at 2,800 metres (9,185 ft) and 950 hp (710 kW) at 5,800 m (19,030 ft)), with a top speed of 329 mph (530 km/h), roughly the same as Mitsubishi Ki-46 "Dinah". The latter was expected to be far better in other ways (endurance, two engines, etc.) so never went into production
- C5M1 (Navy Type 98 Reconnaissance Aircraft Model I) : Improved version of Ki-15-I for the Japanese Navy
- C5M2 (Navy Type 98 Reconnaissance Aircraft Model 2) : Upgraded version of C5M1 with more powerful engine for the Japanese Navy

== Operators ==
Japan

- Imperial Japanese Army Air Force
- Imperial Japanese Navy Air Service
- Various civilian entities, including the Asahi Shimbun

People's Republic of China

- People's Liberation Army Air Force operated an unknown number of captured aircraft. A number of abandoned Ki-15s were captured near Harbin in June 1946, and by 1948, they were completely repaired and entered service as trainers. The last two Ki-15 retired in 1951.

== Specifications (Ki-15-I) ==
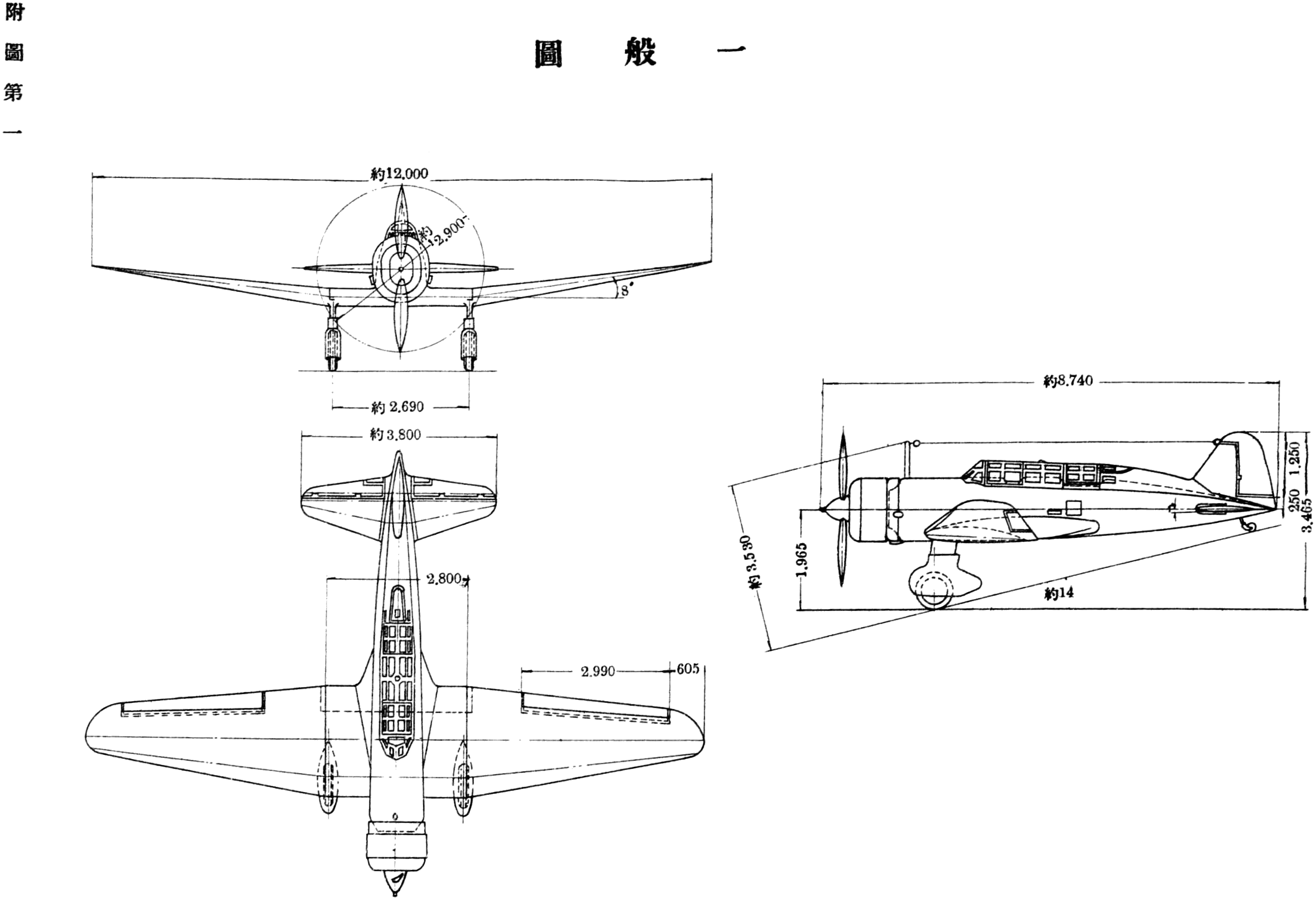
3-view drawing of the Mitsubishi Ki-15

Data from The Concise Guide to Axis Aircraft of World War II, and Japanese Aircraft of the Pacific War

General characteristics

- Crew: 2
- Length: 8.7 m (28 ft 7 in)
- Wingspan: 12 m (39 ft 4 in)
- Height: 3.35 m (11 ft 0 in)
- Wing area: 20.36 m^{2} (219.2 sq ft)
- Empty weight: 1,400 kg (3,086 lb)
- Gross weight: 2,033 kg (4,482 lb)
- Max takeoff weight: 2,300 kg (5,071 lb)
- Powerplant: 1 × Nakajima Ha-8 9-cylinder air-cooled radial piston engine, 477 kW (640 hp)
- Propellers: 2-bladed variable-pitch propeller

Performance

- Maximum speed: 480 km/h (300 mph, 260 kn) at 4,000 m (13,000 ft)
- Cruise speed: 320 km/h (200 mph, 170 kn) at 5,000 m (16,000 ft)
- Range: 2,400 km (1,500 mi, 1,300 nmi)
- Service ceiling: 11,400 m (37,400 ft)
- Time to altitude: 5,000 m (16,000 ft) in 8 minutes 27 seconds

Armament

- Guns: 1 x 7.7 mm (0.303 in) Type 89 machine gun, flexible mounting
- Bombs: 250 kg (550 lb) of bombs

== See also ==
Aircraft of comparable role, configuration, and era

- Polikarpov R-5

Related lists

- List of aircraft of World War II
- List of military aircraft of Japan
