= Mitsubishi Kinsei =

1930s Japanese radial aircraft engine

Kinsei
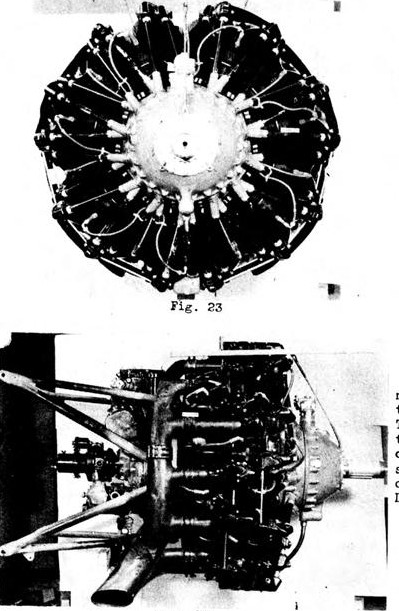
- Type: Radial engine
- National origin: Japan
- Manufacturer: Mitsubishi Heavy Industries
- First run: 1932
- Major applications: Aichi D3A; Yokosuka D4Y3-D4Y4; Kawasaki Ki-100
- Number built: 12,228
- Developed from: Pratt & Whitney R-1690 Hornet
- Developed into: Mitsubishi Shinten, Mitsubishi Zuisei, Mitsubishi Kasei, Ha-43(Ha-211)

The Mitsubishi Kinsei (金星, Venus) was a 14-cylinder, air-cooled, twin-row radial aircraft engine developed by Mitsubishi Heavy Industries in Japan in 1934 for the Imperial Japanese Navy. The Mitsubishi model designation for this engine was A8 while it was an experimental project; in service, it was known as the MK8 "Kinsei" by the Navy. In 1941 the engine was adopted by Army, receiving designation Ha-112 (later Ha-112-I, 1,300hp Army Type 1). In May 1943 it received Ha-33 unified designation code.

== Design and development ==
Early Kinsei models (1 and 2) had A4 internal designation and their cylinder and detail design was based on the single-row, 9-cylinder air-cooled Pratt and Whitney R-1690 Hornet.

In 1933 engine underwent a major redesign and redesignated A8. Head layout was reversed to allow exhaust exit to the rear, reducing back-pressure and allowing for a cleaner installation. Compression ratio increased from 5.3:1 to 6.0:1. These changes resulted in a significant performance uplift, compared to previous variants.

Kinsei 41 saw ever further increase in compression ratio from 6.0:1 to 6.6:1, and a larger supercharger. It's also the first variant to receive a two-digit model numbers. 40 series remained in production from 1936 till the end of the war.

Kinsei 50 series saw the final compression ratio increase to 7.0:1. Indirect fuel injection was fitted as well as a larger two-speed supercharger.

Kinsei 60 series was introduction of direct injection and later, a turbo-supercharger. Its development was run parallel to 50 series. Production started in 1940 and lasted till the end of the war.

== Variants ==
=== Early (A4) variants ===
Data from Goodwin

Kinsei 1
820 hp (610 kW) at 2,300 rpm at takeoff
650 hp (480 kW) at 2,100 rpm at sea level
Kinsei 2
830 hp (620 kW) at 2,350 rpm at takeoff
630 hp (470 kW) at 2,100 rpm at 1,000 m (3,300 ft)

=== Late (A8) variants ===
Data from Goodwin

Kinsei 3
790 hp (590 kW) at 2,150 rpm at 2,000 m (6,600 ft)
Kinsei 41
1,075 hp (802 kW) at 2,500 rpm at 2,000 m (6,600 ft)
990 hp (740 kW) at 2,500 rpm at 2,800 m (9,200 ft)
Higher compression ratio, supercharger
Kinsei 42
1,075 hp (802 kW) at 2,500 rpm at 2,000 m (6,600 ft)
990 hp (740 kW) at 2,500 rpm at 2,800 m (9,200 ft)
Air pump
Kinsei 43
1,000 hp (750 kW) at 2,400 rpm at sea level
990 hp (740 kW) at 2,400 rpm at 2,800 m (9,200 ft)
De-rated for economy
Model 44
1,070 hp (800 kW) at sea level
1,080 hp (810 kW) at 2,000 m (6,600 ft)
Machine gun synchroniser
Kinsei 45
1,075 hp (802 kW) at sea level
1,000 hp (750 kW) at 4,180 m (13,710 ft)
Kinsei 46
930 hp (690 kW) at sea level
1,070 hp (800 kW) at 4,200 m (13,800 ft)
De-rated for extreme economy
Kinsei 51 (MK8A)
1,200 hp (890 kW) at 2,500 rpm at 3,000 m (9,800 ft)
1,100 hp (820 kW) at 2,500 rpm at 6,200 m (20,300 ft)
Redesigned cylinder head, added indirect fuel injection, larger two-speed supercharger
Kinsei 52 (MK8B) (Ha-112-I)
1,200 hp (890 kW) at 2,500 rpm at 3,000 m (9,800 ft)
1,100 hp (820 kW) at 2,500 rpm at 6,200 m (20,300 ft)
Added water injection
Kinsei 53 (MK8C)
1,200 hp (890 kW) at 2,500 rpm at 3,000 m (9,800 ft)
1,100 hp (820 kW) at 2,500 rpm at 6,200 m (20,300 ft)
Higher pressure oil pump
Kinsei 54 (MK8D)
1,200 hp (890 kW) at 2,500 rpm at 3,000 m (9,800 ft)
1,100 hp (820 kW) at 2,500 rpm at 6,200 m (20,300 ft)
Added machine gun synchroniser
Model 61 (Ha-112-II)
1,350 hp (1,010 kW) at 2,000 m (6,600 ft)
1,250 hp (930 kW) at 5,800 m (19,000 ft)
Added direct fuel injection
Kinsei 62 (MK8P)
1,350 hp (1,010 kW) at 2,600 rpm at 2,000 m (6,600 ft)
1,250 hp (930 kW) at 2,600 rpm at 5,800 m (19,000 ft)
Kinsei 62 Ru (Ha-112-II Ru)
1,350 hp (1,010 kW) at 2,600 rpm at 2,000 m (6,600 ft)
1,370 hp (1,020 kW) at 2,600 rpm at 7,700 m (25,300 ft)
1,240 hp (920 kW) at 2,600 rpm at 11,000 m (36,000 ft)
Ru-102 turbo-supercharger

== Applications ==
- Aichi D3A
- Aichi E13A
- Aichi E16A
- Aichi M6A2
- Kawanishi H6K
- Kawanishi N1K5-J
- Kawasaki Ki-96
- Kawasaki Ki-100
- Kawasaki Ki-102
- Mitsubishi A6M8
- Mitsubishi B5M
- Mitsubishi G3M
- Mitsubishi Ki-46-III
- Nakajima/Mahshu Ki-116
- Showa/Nakajima L2D2-L2D5
- Yokosuka D4Y3-D4Y4

== Specifications (Kinsei-44) ==
Data from Jane's.

=== General characteristics ===
- Type: 14-cylinder air-cooled twin-row radial engine
- Bore: 140 mm (5.5 in)
- Stroke: 150 mm (5.9 in)
- Displacement: 32.3 L (1,970 cu in)
- Length: 1,646 mm (64.8 in)
- Diameter: 1,218 mm (48.0 in)
- Dry weight: 545 kg (1,202 lb)

=== Components ===
- Valvetrain: Overhead valve, one inlet and one exhaust valve per cylinder, pushrod operated.
- Supercharger: Centrifugal, single speed.
- Oil system: Triple section pump, one pressure pump, two scavenge pumps.
- Cooling system: Air-cooled
- Reduction gear: Planetary gear, 0.7:1 ratio.

=== Performance ===
- Power output: 1,075 hp (802 kW) at 2,500 rpm at 2,000 m (6,560 ft) maximum.
- Specific power: 24.8 kW/L (0.56 hp/cu in)
- Compression ratio: 6.6:1
- Power-to-weight ratio: 1.5 kW/kg (0.9 hp/lb)

== See also ==
Related development

- Mitsubishi Shinten
- Mitsubishi Kasei
- Pratt & Whitney R-1690 Hornet

Comparable engines

- BMW 801
- Bristol Hercules
- Bristol Taurus
- Fiat A.74
- Gnome-Rhône 14N
- Nakajima Sakae
- Piaggio P.XI
- Piaggio P.XIX
- Pratt & Whitney R-1830
- Shvetsov ASh-82
- Wright R-2600

Related lists

- List of aircraft engines

== Bibliography ==
- Goodwin, Mike & Starkings, Peter (2017). Japanese Aero-Engines 1910-1945. Sandomierz, Poland: MMPBooks. ISBN 978-83-65281-32-6.
- Matsuoka Hisamitsu, Nakanishi Masayoshi. The History of Mitsubishi Aero Engines 1915–1945. Miki Press, Japan, 2005. ISBN 4-89522-461-9
- Gunston, Bill. World Encyclopaedia of Aero Engines. Cambridge, England. Patrick Stephens Limited, 1989. ISBN 1-85260-163-9
- Jane's Fighting Aircraft of World War II. London. Studio Editions Ltd, 1989. ISBN 0-517-67964-7
- Peattie, Mark R., Sunburst: The Rise of Japanese Naval Air Power 1909-1941, Annapolis, Maryland: Naval Institute Press, 2001, ISBN 1-55750-432-6
