= Nakajima Sakae =

1940s Japanese piston aircraft engine

Sakae
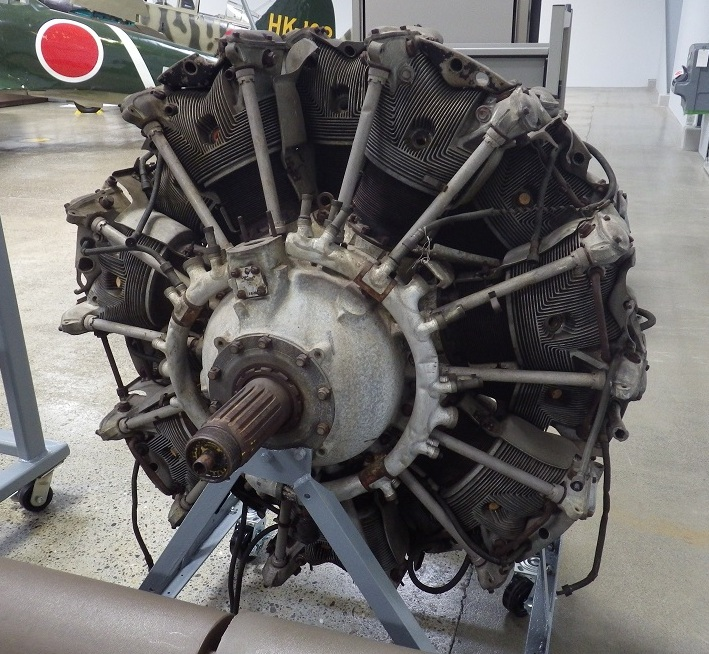
- Nakajima Sakae engine on display at the Flying Heritage & Combat Armor Museum
- Type: Piston aircraft engine
- Manufacturer: Nakajima
- First run: 1939
- Major applications: Mitsubishi A6M; Nakajima Ki-43; Kawasaki Ki-48
- Number built: 30,233
- Developed from: Nakajima Ha5
- Developed into: Nakajima Homare

The Nakajima Sakae (栄, Glory) was a two-row, 14-cylinder, air-cooled, radial engine used in a number of combat aircraft of the Imperial Japanese Navy and Imperial Japanese Army before and during World War II.

== Design and development ==
The engine was designed by Nakajima Aircraft Company with code name NAM, as a scaled-down and advanced version of the previous NAL design (Army Type 97 850 hp radial engine, Nakajima Ha5). The Imperial Japanese Army Air Force called the first of the series the Ha25 (ハ25) and later versions were designated Ha105 and Ha115, in the Hatsudoki designation system and Ha-35 in the unified designation system, while the Imperial Japanese Navy Air Service designation was Nakajima NK1, with subtypes identified by model numbers; thus Nakajima NK1 Sakae 10, 20, and 30 series.

In total, 21,166 were made by Nakajima; 9,067 were manufactured by other firms.

== Variants ==
Army Type 99 975 hp air-cooled radial
Long Army designation for the Nakajima NK1 radial engine named Sakae
Nakajima Ha25 (Hatsudoki designation)
Short Army designation for the initial production version of the Nakajima NK1 radial engine named Sakae
Nakajima Ha105 (Hatsudoki designation)
Nakajima Ha115 (Hatsudoki designation)
Nakajima Ha115-I
Nakajima Ha115-II
Nakajima Ha-35 (unified designation)
Nakajima Ha-35 Model 11
Nakajima Ha-35 Model 12
Nakajima Ha-35 Model 23 - 1,150 hp (858 kW)

Nakajima NK1 (Navy designation)
NK1C Sakae 12 - 925 hp (690 kW), 940 hp (701 kW), 975 hp (727 kW)
NK1D Sakae 11 - 970 hp (723 kW), 985 hp (735 kW)
NK1F Sakae 21 - 1,130 PS (831 kW; 1,115 bhp)
NK1E Sakae 31 - 1,130 hp (843 kW), boosted to 1,210 hp (902 kW) with water-methanol injection

== Applications ==
- Kawasaki Ki-45 (prototype)
- Kawasaki Ki-48
- Kawasaki Ki-56
- Mitsubishi A6M
- Mitsubishi C5M2
- Nakajima B5N2
- Nakajima J1N
- Nakajima Ki-43
- Nakajima Ki-115
- Tachikawa Ki-77

== Surviving engines ==
A small number of original Sakae powerplants are on display in aviation museums, usually mounted into the airframes of restored Mitsubishi A6M Zeros. Only one airworthy Zero worldwide still flies with a restored Sakae powerplant, the Planes of Fame Museum's A6M5 example, bearing tail number 61-120.

== Specifications (Sakae 21) ==
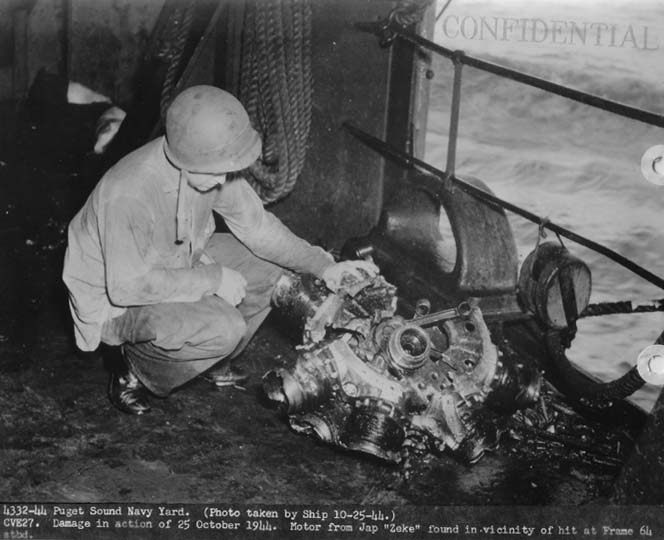
USS Suwannee after the kamikaze attack of 25 October 1944: Parts of the A6M5 Kamikaze-Zero's Nakajima Sakae 21, 14-cylinder radial engine were found in the vicinity of the hit. Cylinder heads are destroyed, connecting rods and crankshaft are visible.

Data from TAIC Manual

=== General characteristics ===
- Type: 14-cylinder air-cooled two-row radial engine
- Bore: 130 mm (5.1 in)
- Stroke: 150 mm (5.9 in)
- Displacement: 27.9 L (1,687 in³)
- Length: 1,600 mm (63 in)
- Diameter: 1,150 mm (45 in)
- Dry weight: 590 kg (1,300 lb)

=== Components ===
- Valvetrain: Overhead valve
- Supercharger: Gear driven, two speed.
- Fuel system: 2 BBL D.D. Float Carb. automatic mixture and boost control
- Fuel type: 92 Octane
- Cooling system: Air-cooled

=== Performance ===
- Power output: 842.64 kW (1130hp) at altitude at 2750 rpm
- Specific power: 30.2 kW/L (0.66 hp/in³)
- Compression ratio: 7:1
- Power-to-weight ratio: 1.428 kW/kg (0.869 hp/lb)

== See also ==
Comparable engines

- BMW 801
- Bristol Hercules
- Bristol Taurus
- Pratt & Whitney R-1830
- Fiat A.74
- Gnome-Rhône 14N
- Mitsubishi Zuisei
- Piaggio P.XI
- Piaggio P.XIX
- Shvetsov ASh-82
- Tumansky M-88

Related lists

- List of aircraft engines
