= Yokosuka R2Y Keiun =

Japanese WWII prototype aircraft

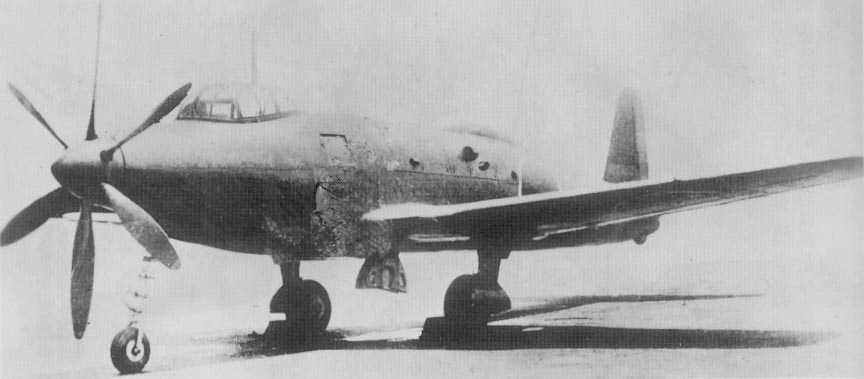

General information
- Type: Reconnaissance, Fighter
- Manufacturer: Yokosuka
- Status: Cancelled
- Primary user: Imperial Japanese Navy (intended)
- Number built: 3 (1 completed)

History
- First flight: 8 May 1945

The Yokosuka R2Y Keiun (景雲, cirrus cloud) was a prototype reconnaissance aircraft built in Japan late in World War II.

== Design and development ==
Commissioned for the Imperial Japanese Navy, after the R1Y design was cancelled due to its disappointing performance estimates, the R2Y used coupled engines driving a single propeller and also featured a tricycle undercarriage.

Completed in April 1945, the prototype made a short flight on 8 May but was destroyed in a US air raid only a few days later, thus ending development.

A proposal was also made to develop the R2Y into a turbojet-powered light bomber by replacing its piston engines with two Mitsubishi Ne-330s. Designated the R2Y2 Keiun Kai, it was not constructed before the end of the War.

== Specifications (R2Y1) ==
Data from Japanese Secret Projects: Experimental Aircraft of the IJA and IJN 1939–1945, Japanese Aircraft of the Pacific War

General characteristics

- Crew: 2 pilot and radio operator
- Length: 13.04 m (42 ft 9 in)
- Wingspan: 13.99 m (45 ft 11 in)
- Height: 4.23 m (13 ft 11 in)
- Wing area: 33.99 m^{2} (365.9 sq ft)
- Empty weight: 6,015 kg (13,261 lb)
- Gross weight: 8,100 kg (17,857 lb)
- Max takeoff weight: 9,400 kg (20,723 lb)
- Fuel capacity: 1,555 L (411 US gal; 342 imp gal)
- Powerplant: 1 × Aichi Ha-70 (unified) 24-cylinder liquid-cooled coupled V-12 piston engines, 2,500 kW (3,400 hp) for take-off

2,312 kW (3,100 hp) at 3,000 m (9,800 ft)

- Propellers: 6-bladed constant-speed metal propeller

Performance

- Maximum speed: 718.5 km/h (446.5 mph, 388.0 kn) at 10,000 m (33,000 ft)
- Cruise speed: 463 km/h (288 mph, 250 kn) at 4,000 m (13,000 ft)
- Landing speed: 166 km/h (103 mph; 90 kn)
- Range: 3,139 km (1,950 mi, 1,695 nmi)
- Ferry range: 3,611 km (2,244 mi, 1,950 nmi)
- Service ceiling: 11,700 m (38,400 ft)
- Time to altitude: 10,000 m (33,000 ft) in 21 minutes
- Wing loading: 238.26 kg/m^{2} (48.80 lb/sq ft)
- Power/mass: 0.316 kW/kg (0.192 hp/lb)

== See also ==
Aircraft of comparable role, configuration, and era

- Heinkel He 119 (tandem-engine with single propeller)
- Kawasaki Ki-64 (tandem-engine with single propeller)
- Messerschmitt Me 509
- Tupolev Tu-91

Related lists

- List of aircraft of World War II
