= Daimler-Benz DB 601 =

German aircraft engine

DB 601
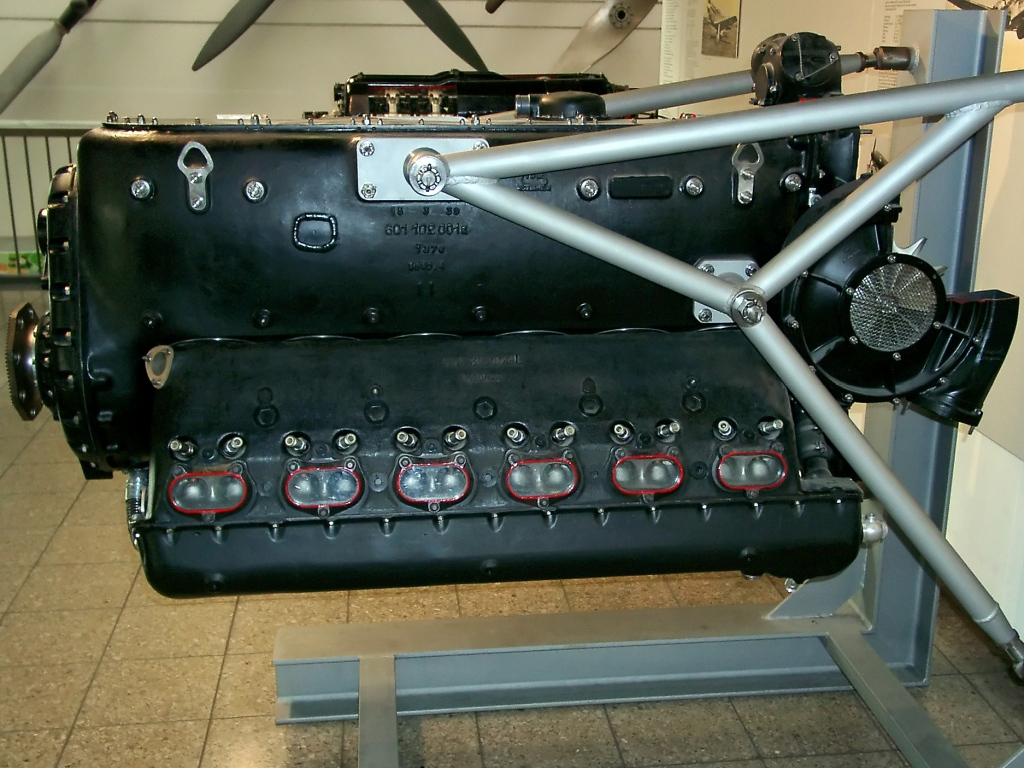
- Preserved Daimler-Benz DB 601
- Type: Piston V12 aircraft engine
- National origin: Germany
- Manufacturer: Daimler-Benz
- First run: 1935
- Major applications: Messerschmitt Bf 109E-F Messerschmitt Bf 110C-F
- Number built: 19,000
- Developed from: Daimler-Benz DB 600
- Developed into: Daimler-Benz DB 603; Daimler-Benz DB 605
- Variants: Aichi Atsuta; Kawasaki Ha-40

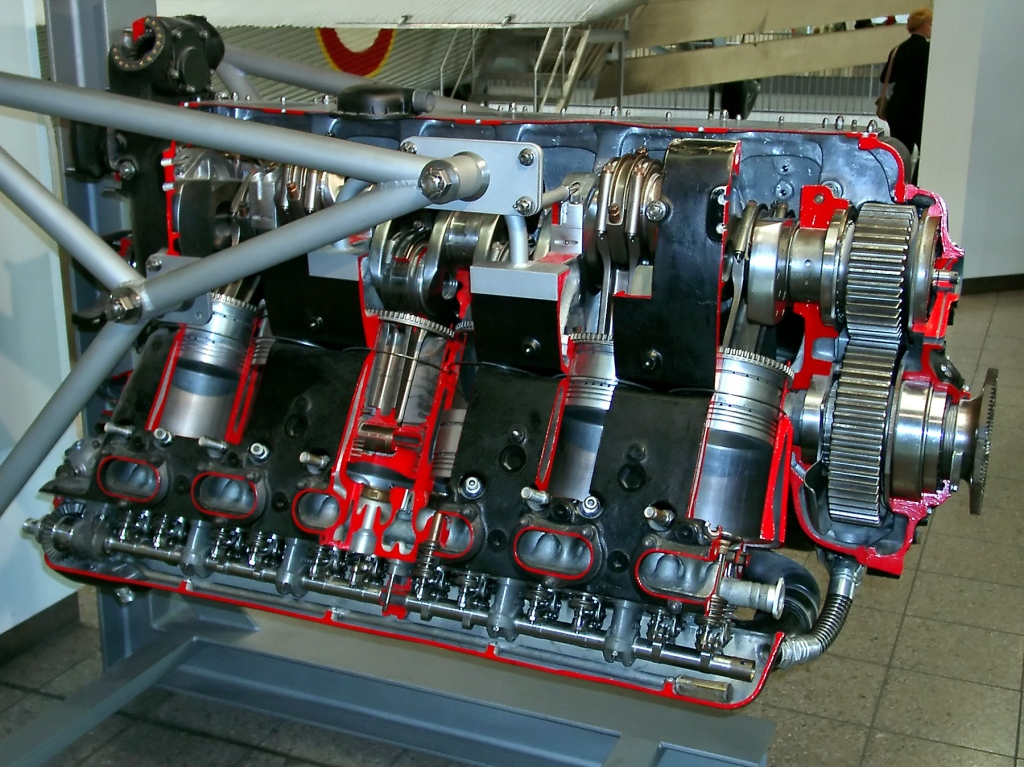
DB 601A, partially sectioned (right side)

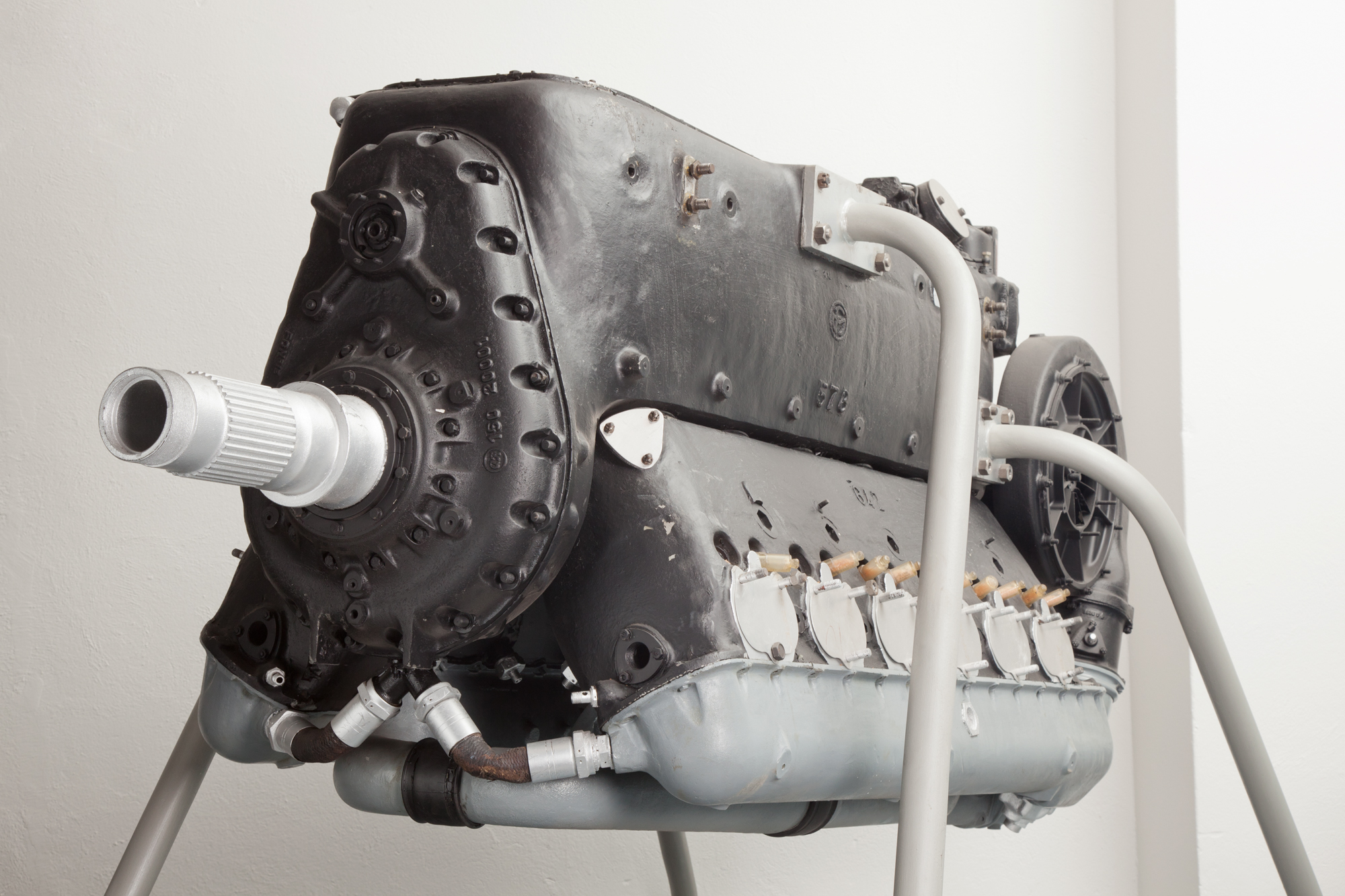
Alfa Romeo R.A.1000 Monsone in Museo Nazionale Scienza e Tecnologia Leonardo da Vinci

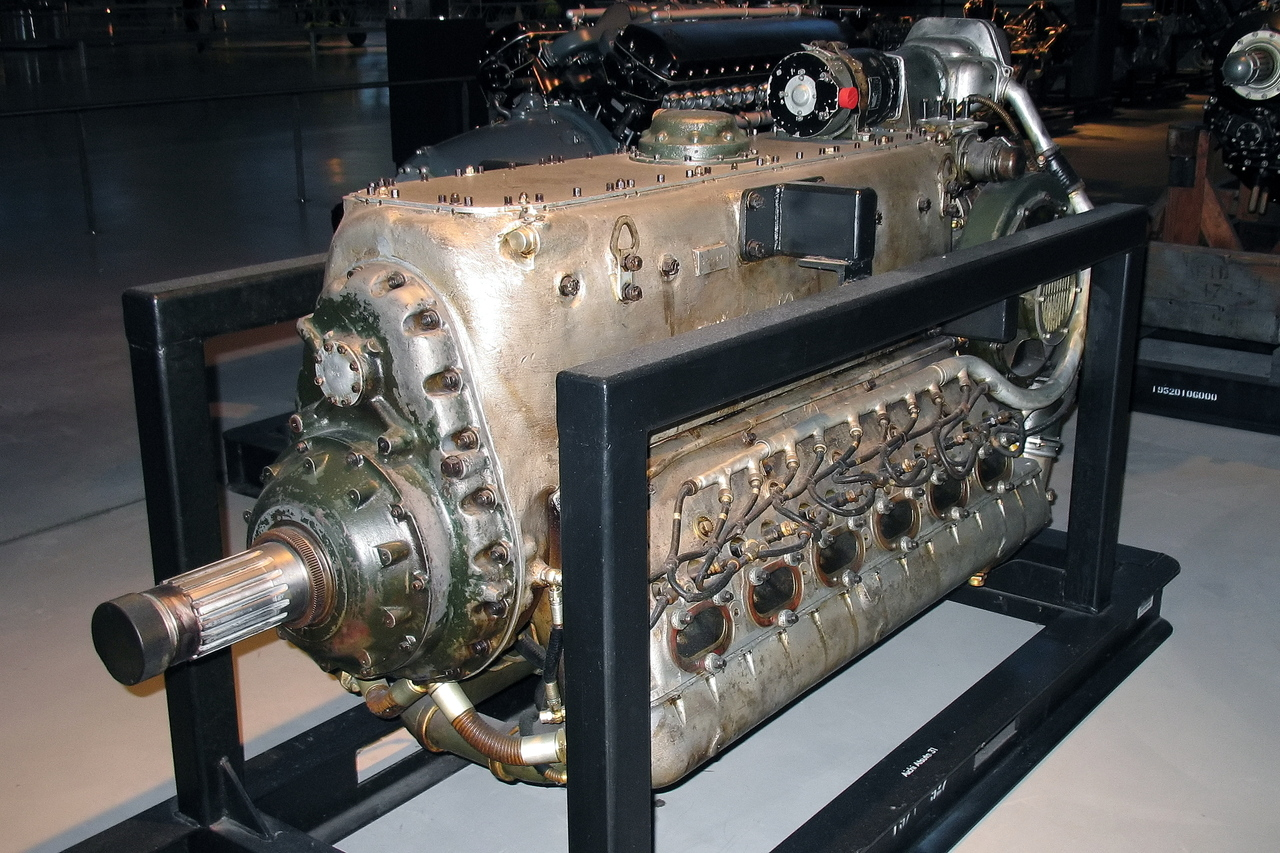
Aichi Atsuta, a license-built DB 601 (left side)

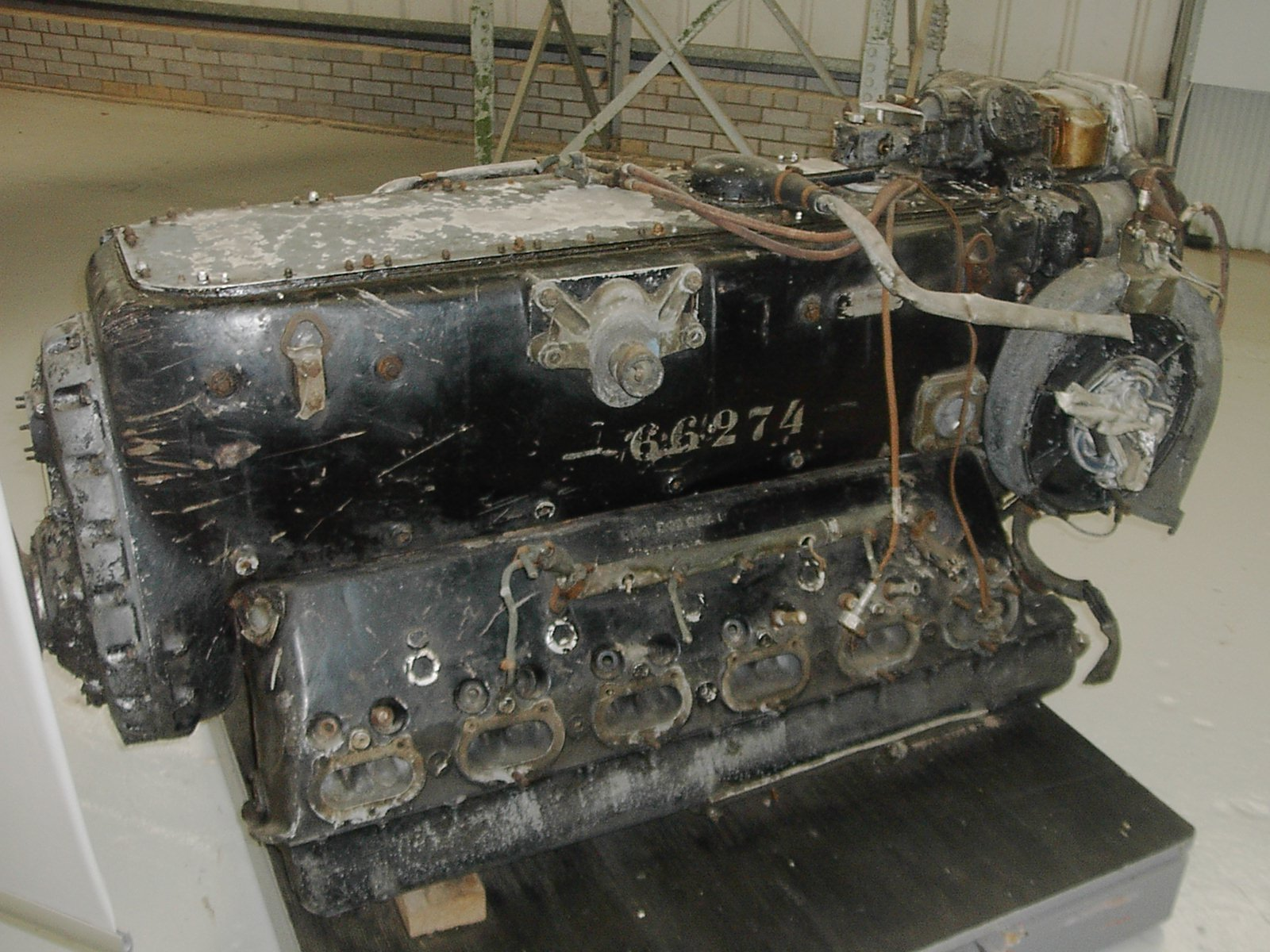
One of the DB 601 engines from Rudolf Hess's Messerschmitt Bf 110 on display at the National Museum of Flight in Scotland

The Daimler-Benz DB 601 was a German aircraft engine that was built during World War II. It was a liquid-cooled inverted V12, that powered the Messerschmitt Bf 109, Messerschmitt Bf 110, and many others. Approximately 19,000 601s were produced before being replaced by the improved Daimler-Benz DB 605 in 1942.

At its core, the DB 601 was an improved DB 600 with direct fuel injection. Fuel injection required power to be taken off the drive shaft, but in return, improved low-RPM performance significantly and provided aerobatic performance in maneuvers where early versions of carbureted engines like the British Rolls-Royce Merlin lost power when the carburetor float bowl ran dry.

The 601's fuel injection provided a significant boost in performance which its competitor, the Junkers Jumo 210, did not match for some time. By the time the fuel-injected Jumo 211 arrived, the 601 had already cemented its place as the engine for high-performance designs like fighters, high-speed bombers, and similar roles. The 211 was relegated to use in bombers and transport aircraft. In this respect, the 601 was the counterpart to the Merlin engine of roughly the same size and power.

The DB 601Aa was licence-built in Japan by Aichi as the Atsuta, by Kawasaki as the Ha40, and in Italy by Alfa Romeo as the R.A.1000 R.C.41-I Monsone.

== Development ==
Based on the guidelines laid down by the German "Reichverkehrsministerium" (Reich Ministry of Transport), in 1930 Daimler-Benz began development of a new aero engine of the 30 L (1,800 cu in) displacement class: a liquid-cooled inverted-vee 12-cylinder piston engine. This was designated F4, and by 1931 two prototypes were running on the test bench. These were followed by the improved F4B, which became the prototype for the DB 600.

In 1933, Daimler-Benz finally received a contract to develop its new engine and to build six examples of the DB 600. For the year after, the DB 600 was the only German aero engine in the 30-litre class. In total, 2,281 DB 600s were built.

The DB 601A-1 was a development of the DB 600 with mechanical direct fuel injection. Like all DB 601s, it had a 33.9 litre displacement. The first DB 601A-1 prototype, designated as F4E, was test run in 1935, and an order for 150 engines was placed in February 1937.

Serial production began in November 1937, and ended in 1943, after 19,000 examples of all types were produced.

== Variants ==
DB 601 A-1
Up to 1,100 PS (809 kW; 1,085 hp) at sea level with 2,400 rpm, up to 1,020 PS (750 kW; 1,006 hp) at 2,400 rpm and 4,500 m (14,800 ft) altitude, B4 fuel
DB 601 Aa
Up to 1,175 PS (864 kW; 1,159 hp) at sea level with 2,500 rpm, up to 1,100 PS (809 kW; 1,085 hp) at 2,400 rpm and 3,700 m (12,100 ft) altitude, B4 fuel
DB 601 B-1
Same as DB601 A-1 for use in Messerschmitt Bf 110 and/or bomber aircraft (different prop/engine ratio, 1:1.88 instead of 1:1.55)
DB 601 Ba
Similar to Aa for use in Messerschmitt Bf 110 and/or bomber aircraft (different prop/engine ratio, 1:1.88 instead of 1:1.55)
DB 601 M
For use in the Heinkel He 100D 1,175 PS (864.2 kW; 1,158.9 hp)
DB 601 N
Up to 1,175 PS (864 kW; 1,159 hp) at sea level and at 4,900 m (16,100 ft) altitude with 2,600 rpm, C3 fuel
Up to 1,270 PS (934 kW; 1,253 hp) at 2,100 m (6,900 ft) altitude with 2,600 rpm
DB 601 P
Same as DB 601 N for use in Messerschmitt Bf 110 and/or bomber aircraft (different prop/engine ratio, 1:1.88 instead of 1:1.55)
DB 601 E
Up to 1,350 PS (993 kW; 1,332 hp) at sea level with 2,700 rpm, up to 1,320 PS (970 kW; 1,300 hp) with 2.700 rpm at 4,800 m (15,700 ft) altitude, B4 fuel
Up to 1,450 PS (1,066 kW; 1,430 hp) at 2,100 m (6,900 ft) altitude with 2,700 rpm
DB 601 F/G
Same as DB 601 E for use in Messerschmitt Bf 110, Messerschmitt Me 210 and/or bomber aircraft (different prop/engine ratio,1:1.875 (601F), 1:2.06 (601G) instead of 1:1.685)
DB 606 A/B
Project initiated in February 1937, to "twin-up" two DB 601As or Es coupled to work on a single propeller shaft with all-up weight of some 1.5 tonnes; for use in Heinkel He 119 (one DB 606) and Messerschmitt Me 261 (twin DB 606) designs, where they worked well in their prototype airframes; saw first combat use with early Heinkel He 177As - 2,700 PS (1,986 kW) at sea level with a mirror-imaged starboard component engine supercharger. Derided as "welded-together engines" by Reichsmarschall Hermann Göring in August 1942, from the problems they caused with engine fires in the He 177A during service from their inadequate installation design.
Alfa-Romeo R.A.1000 R.C.41-I Monsone
Licence built by Alfa Romeo in Italy
Aichi Atsuta

Licence built by Aichi in Japan
Kawasaki Ha40

Licence built by Kawasaki in Japan

== Applications ==
DB 601

- Arado Ar 240
- CANSA FC.20
- Dornier Do 215
- Heinkel He 100
- Heinkel He 111 P
- Henschel Hs 130 A-0
- Kawasaki Ki-60
- Messerschmitt Bf 109
- Messerschmitt Bf 110
- Messerschmitt Me 210
- Savoia-Marchetti SM.88

DB 606

- Heinkel He 119
- Heinkel He 177A-1 and A-3
- Junkers Ju 288C
- Messerschmitt Me 261

=== Licensees ===
Aichi Atsuta

- Aichi M6A
- Yokosuka D4Y

Alfa Romeo R.A.1000 R.C.41

- Macchi C.202
- Reggiane Re.2001

Kawasaki Ha40

- Kawasaki Ki-61

== Specifications (DB 601 Aa / Ba) ==
Data from , Flugzeug-Typenbuch. Handbuch der deutschen Luftfahrt- und Zubehör-Industrie 1944

=== General characteristics ===
- Type: 12-cylinder liquid-cooled supercharged 60° inverted Vee aircraft piston engine
- Bore: 150 mm (5.91 in)
- Stroke: 160 mm (6.30 in)
- Displacement: 33.9 L (2,068.7 cu in)
- Length: 1,722 mm (67.8 in)
- Width: 739 mm (29.1 in)
- Height: 1,027 mm (40.4 in)
- Dry weight: 600 kg (1,323 lb) dry, unequipped

=== Components ===
- Valvetrain: Two intake and two sodium-cooled exhaust valves per cylinder actuated via a single overhead camshaft per cylinder block.
- Supercharger: Gear-driven single-speed centrifugal type supercharger (later, hydraulic-driven) rated to 4,000 m (13,000 ft))
- Fuel system: Direct fuel injection
- Oil system: Dry sump with one pressure pump at 0.3–0.35 atm (4.4–5.1 psi; 0.30–0.35 bar) and two scavenge pumps
- Cooling system: Liquid-cooled

=== Performance ===
- Power output:

- 1,175 PS (1,159 hp; 864 kW) at 2,500 rpm for takeoff
- 1,100 PS (1,085 hp; 809 kW) at 2,400 rpm at 4,000 m (13,100 ft)
- 1,070 PS (1,055 hp; 787 kW) at 2,400 rpm at 3,700 m (12,100 ft)
- 1,000 PS (986 hp; 735 kW) at 2,400 rpm (max. continuous / cruise) at 4,000 m (13,100 ft)

- Specific power: 34.65 PS/L (0.56 hp/cu in; 25.49 kW/L)
- Compression ratio: 6.9:1
- Specific fuel consumption: 0.220 kg/PSh (0.492 lb/(hp⋅h); 0.299 kg/kWh) at max continuous
- Oil consumption: 0.005–0.008 kg/PSh (0.011–0.018 lb/(hp⋅h); 0.007–0.011 kg/kWh) at max continuous
- Power-to-weight ratio: 1.96 PS/kg (0.88 hp/lb; 1.44 kW/kg)
- Reduction gear Spur

- 601Aa 0.645:1
- 601Ba 0.532:1

== See also ==
Related development

- Daimler-Benz DB 600
- Daimler-Benz DB 603
- Daimler-Benz DB 605
- Aichi Atsuta
- Kawasaki Ha-40

Comparable engines

- Allison V-1710
- Continental I-1430
- Hispano-Suiza 12Y
- Isotta-Fraschini Asso XI
- Junkers Jumo 211
- Klimov M-103
- Klimov M-105
- Mikulin AM-35
- Rolls-Royce Merlin

Related lists

- List of aircraft engines
- List of aircraft engines of Germany during World War II

== Bibliography ==
- Bingham, Victor (1998). Major Piston Aero Engines of World War II. Shrewsbury, UK: Airlife Publishing. ISBN 1-84037-012-2.
- Christopher, John (2013). The Race for Hitler's X-Planes: Britain's 1945 Mission to Capture Secret Luftwaffe Technology. Stroud, UK: History Press. ISBN 978-0-7524-6457-2.
- Gunston, Bill (2006). World Encyclopedia of Aero Engines: From the Pioneers to the Present Day (5th ed.). Stroud, UK: Sutton. ISBN 0-7509-4479-X.
- Mankau, Heinz and Peter Petrick. Messerschmitt Bf 110, Me 210, Me 410. Raumfahrt, Germany: Aviatic Verlag, 2001. ISBN 3-925505-62-8.
- Neil Gregor Daimler-Benz in the Third Reich. Yale University Press, 1998
