= Heinkel He 119 =

1930s German experimental aircraft

He 119

General information
- Type: Reconnaissance bomber
- Manufacturer: Heinkel
- Primary user: Luftwaffe
- Number built: 8

History
- First flight: July 1937

The Heinkel He 119 was an experimental single-propeller monoplane with two coupled engines, developed in Germany. A private venture by Heinkel to test radical ideas by the Günter brothers, the He 119 was originally intended to act as an reconnaissance bomber capable of eluding all fighters due to its high performance.

== Development ==
Design was begun in the late summer of 1936. A prominent feature of the aircraft was the streamlined fuselage, which had an extensively glazed cockpit immediately behind the propeller. Two of the three-man crew sat one each side of a driveshaft, which ran aft to a coupled pair of Daimler-Benz DB 601 engines mounted above the wing center-section, mounted together within a common mount (the starboard component engine having a "mirror-image" centrifugal supercharger) with a common gear reduction unit fitted to the front ends of each engine, forming a drive unit known as the DB 606. The He 119 was the first German aircraft to use the "high-power" powerplant system meant to provide German aircraft with an powerplant design of over-1,500 kW (2,000 PS) output capability, but weighing 1.5 tonnes apiece.

The DB 606 was installed just behind the aft cockpit wall, near the center of gravity, with an enclosed extension shaft passing through the centerline of the cockpit to drive a large four-blade variable-pitch propeller in the nose. An evaporative cooling system was used on the V1, with the remaining prototypes having a semi-retractable radiator directly below the engine to augment cooling during take-off and climb.

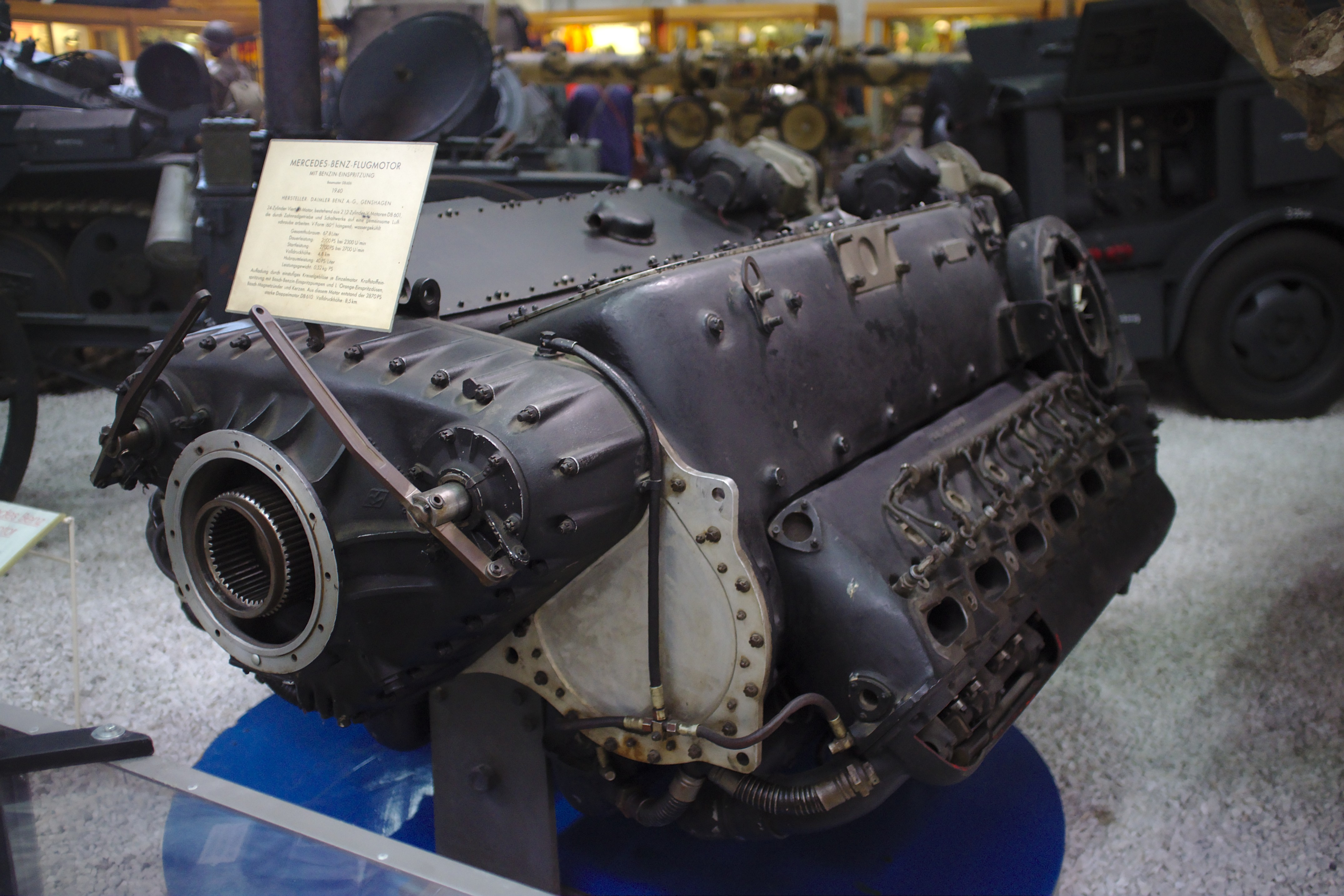
A DB 606 engine on display at the Technik Museum Sinsheim

Only eight prototypes were completed and the aircraft did not see production, mainly because of the shortages of DB 601 "component" engines to construct the 1,500 kg (3,300 lb) DB 606 "power systems" they formed. The first two prototypes were built as land planes, with retractable landing gear. The third prototype (V3) was constructed as a seaplane with twin floats. This was tested at the Erprobungsstelle Travemünde military seaplane test facility on the Baltic coast, and was scrapped in 1942 at Heinkel's factory airfield in Marienehe.

On 22 November 1937, the fourth prototype (V4) made a world class-record flight in which it recorded an airspeed of 505 km/h (314 mph), with a payload of 1,000 kg (2,205 lb), over a distance of 1,000 km (621 mi). The four remaining prototypes were completed during the spring and early summer of 1938, the V5 and V6 being A-series production prototypes for the reconnaissance model, and the V7 and V8 being B-series production prototypes for the bomber model.

These four aircraft were three-seaters with a defensive armament of one 7.92 mm (0.312 in) MG 15 machine gun in a dorsal position, V7 and V8 having provision for a normal bombload of three 250 kg (551 lb) bombs or maximum bombload of 1,000 kg (2,205 lb). V7 and V8 were sold to Japan in May 1940, and extensively studied; the insights thus gained were used in the design of the Yokosuka R2Y. The remaining prototypes served as engine test-beds, flying with various prototype versions of the DB 606 and DB 610 (twinned DB 605s) and the strictly-experimental DB 613 (twinned DB 603).

== Variants ==
He 111U
Propaganda designation of the He 119
He 119
Basic version, eight prototypes built.
He 519
1944 high-speed bomber development, designed as a private venture by Heinkel to test radical ideas by the Günter brothers, the He 519 was designed to use the 24-cylinder Daimler-Benz DB 613, but the aircraft remained a concept and was abandoned at the end of the war.

== Specifications (He 119 V6) ==
Data from Warplanes of the Third Reich

General characteristics

- Crew: 3
- Length: 14.8 m (48 ft 7 in)
- Wingspan: 15.9 m (52 ft 2 in)
- Height: 5.4 m (17 ft 9 in)
- Wing area: 50.2 m^{2} (540 sq ft)
- Empty weight: 5,201 kg (11,466 lb)
- Gross weight: 7,581 kg (16,713 lb)
- Powerplant: 1 × Daimler-Benz DB 606A-2 24-cylinder coupled V-12 liquid-cooled piston engine, 1,750 kW (2,350 hp)
- Propellers: 4-bladed constant-speed propeller

Performance

- Maximum speed: 591 km/h (367 mph, 319 kn)
- Cruise speed: 510 km/h (320 mph, 280 kn)
- Range: 3,120 km (1,940 mi, 1,690 nmi) at 6,000 m (20,000 ft)
- Service ceiling: 8,500 m (27,900 ft)
- Time to altitude:

- 2,000 m (6,600 ft) in 3 minutes 6 seconds
- 4,500 m (14,800 ft) in 10 minutes 42 seconds

Armament

- Guns: 1 × 7.9 mm (.312 in) MG 15 machine gun in dorsal position

== See also ==
Aircraft of comparable role, configuration, and era

- Messerschmitt Me 261

Related lists

- List of World War II military aircraft of Germany
- List of military aircraft of Germany

== Sources ==
- Donald, David, "An Industry of Prototypes - Heinkel He 119", Wings of Fame, Volume 12. Aerospace Publishing Ltd., London, UK/AIRtime Publishing Inc., Westport, Connecticut, 1998, ISBN 1-86184-021-7 / 1-880588-23-4, pp. 30–34.
- Green, William. Warplanes of the Third Reich. New York: Doubleday, 1972. ISBN 0-385-05782-2.
