= Mitsubishi Zuisei =

1930s Japanese piston aircraft engine

Zuisei
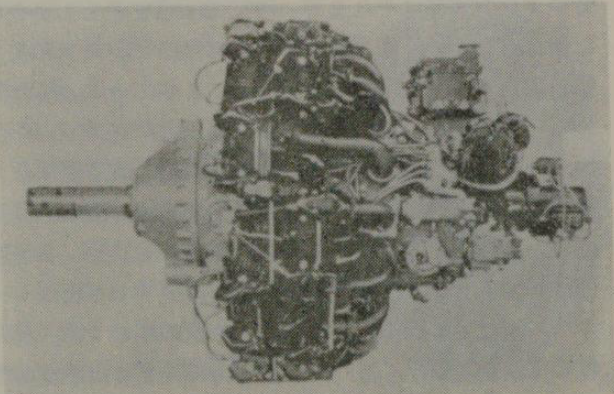
- Type: 14-cylinder, air-cooled, supercharged, two-row radial piston engine
- Manufacturer: Mitsubishi
- First run: 1931
- Major applications: Kawanishi E7K2, Kawasaki Ki-45, Mitsubishi F1M, Mitsubishi C5M, Mitsubishi Ki-46-I, Mitsubishi Ki-51
- Number built: 11,903
- Developed from: Mitsubishi Kinsei

The Mitsubishi Zuisei (瑞星, Holy Star) was a 14-cylinder, supercharged, air-cooled, two-row radial engine used in a variety of early World War II Japanese aircraft. It was one of the smallest 14-cyl. engines in the world and the smallest diameter Japanese engine. The Mitsubishi model designation for this engine was A14 while it was an experimental project, in service it was known as the MK2, followed by the revision code letter, and known as the Ha-26 and Ha-102 by the Army and "Zuisei" by the Navy. Unified designation code was Ha-31.

== Design and development ==
The MK2A Zuisei engine was a 14-cylinder, supercharged, air-cooled two-row radial engine with a 140 mm (5.5 in) bore and 130 mm (5.12 in) stroke for a displacement of 28L (1,710ci) and a nominal power rating of 805 kW (1080 hp) for takeoff and 787 kW (1055 hp) at 2800 meters (9185 feet).

Mitsubishi used the standard designation system to identify this engine while it was under development. The MK2 designation starts with the Manufacturer's assigned identification letter, in this case, "M" for Mitsubishi, followed by a letter that identifies the engine arrangement, in this case "K" for air-cooled, and then the sequentially assigned design number, in this case "2" for the second design. Revisions to the engine are identified by the letter following the preceding designation, with letter "A" being the original, or first, version.

Mitsubishi also had a custom to name its engines with a short two syllable name that references objects found in the sky. The naming sequence started with this engine, the MK2 Zuisei "Holy star", and was followed in order by the MK4 Kinsei "Venus" and the MK8 Kasei "Mars".

== Variants ==
MK2A Zuisei 11
875 horsepower (652 kW), 2,540 rpm at takeoff,
925 horsepower (690 kW), 2,450 rpm at 1,800 metres (5,900 ft)
MK2B Zuisei 12
780 horsepower (580 kW), 2,540 rpm at take-off,
875 horsepower (652 kW) 2,540 rpm at 3,600 metres (11,800 ft)
MK2C Zuisei 13
1,080 horsepower (810 kW), 2,700 rpm at take-off,
950 horsepower (710 kW) 2,600 rpm at 6,000 metres (20,000 ft)
MK2C Zuisei 14 Ha-26-I
850 horsepower (630 kW), 2,650 rpm at take-off,
900 horsepower (670 kW) 2,650 rpm at 3,500 metres (11,500 ft)
MK2C Zuisei 15 Ha-26-II
940 horsepower (700 kW), 2,650 rpm at take-off,
950 horsepower (710 kW) 2,650 rpm at 6,000 metres (20,000 ft)
MK2D Zuisei 21 Ha-102
1,080 horsepower (810 kW), 2,700 rpm at take-off,
1,050 horsepower (780 kW) 2,700 rpm at 2,800 metres (9,200 ft),
950 horsepower (710 kW) 2,700 rpm at 5,800 metres (19,000 ft)

== Applications ==
- Mitsubishi A6M (prototype)
- Mitsubishi F1M
- Mitsubishi C5M1
- Kawanishi E7K
- Kawasaki Ki-45
- Kokusai Ki-105
- Mitsubishi Ki-46
- Mitsubishi Ki-57

== Specifications (MK2A Zuisei 11) ==
Data from

=== General characteristics ===
- Type: 14-cylinder, air-cooled, supercharged, two-row radial piston engine
- Bore: 140 mm (5.5 in)
- Stroke: 130 mm (5.1 in)
- Displacement: 28.0 L (1,710 in³)
- Diameter: 1,118 mm (44.0 in)
- Dry weight: 540 kg (1,190 lb)

=== Components ===
- Valvetrain: pushrod operated, Two overhead valves per cylinder
- Supercharger: centrifugal single stage single speed
- Fuel type: 87 octane rating gasoline
- Cooling system: air-cooled

=== Performance ===
- Compression ratio: 6.5

== See also ==
Related lists

- List of aircraft engines
