= Kawasaki Ki-61 =

WWII Japanese fighter aircraft

Ki-61 Hien
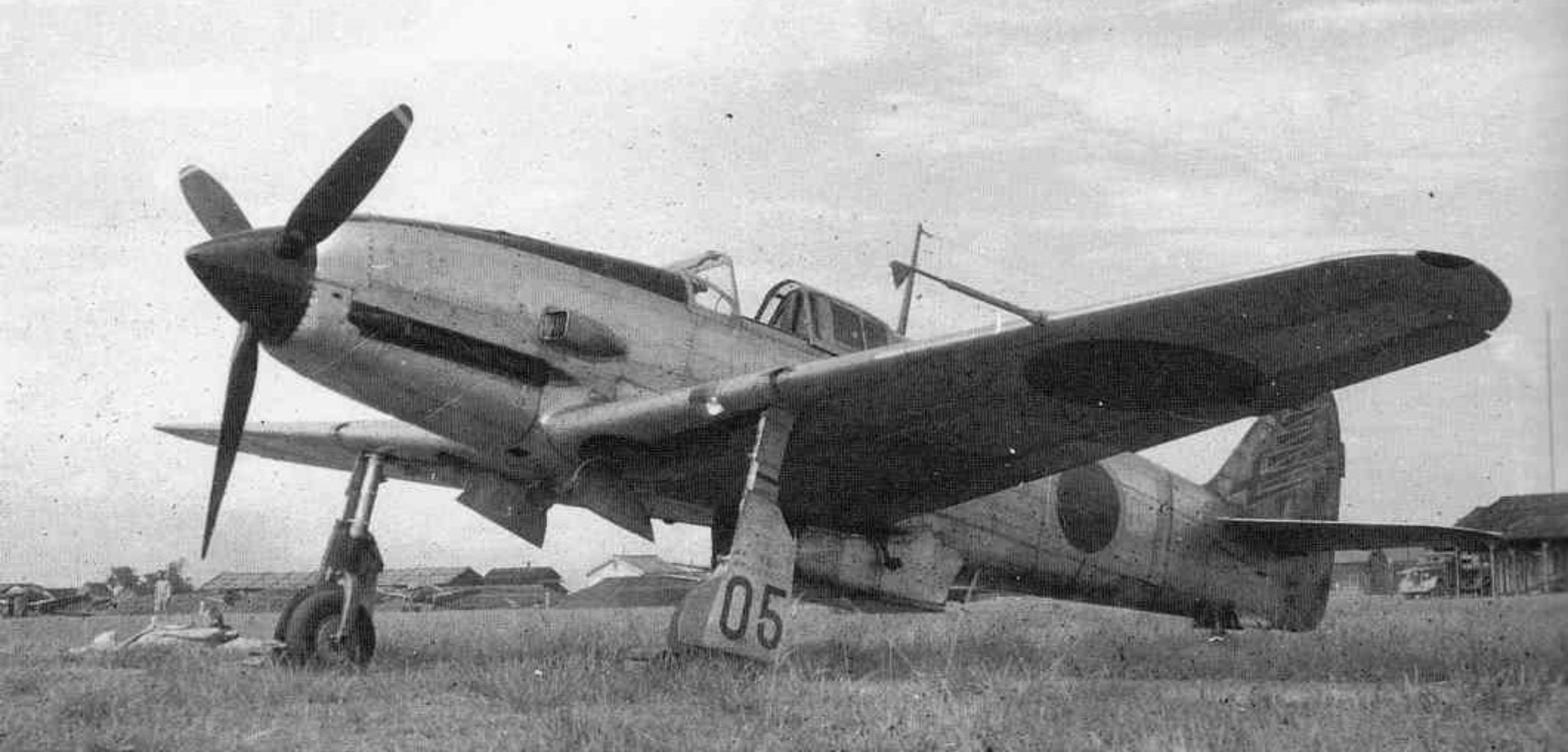
- Ki-61-I-Ko of the 37th Training Squadron stationed at Matsuyama Airfield, Taiwan. March 1944.

General information
- Type: Fighter aircraft
- Manufacturer: Kawasaki Kōkūki Kōgyō K.K.
- Designer: Takeo Doi
- Primary users: Imperial Japanese Army Air Service: Chinese Nationalist Air Force; Indonesian Air Force (IPSF); People's Liberation Army Air Force
- Number built: 3,078

History
- Introduction date: 1942
- First flight: December 1941
- Retired: 1945
- Developed from: Kawasaki Ki-60
- Developed into: Kawasaki Ki-100

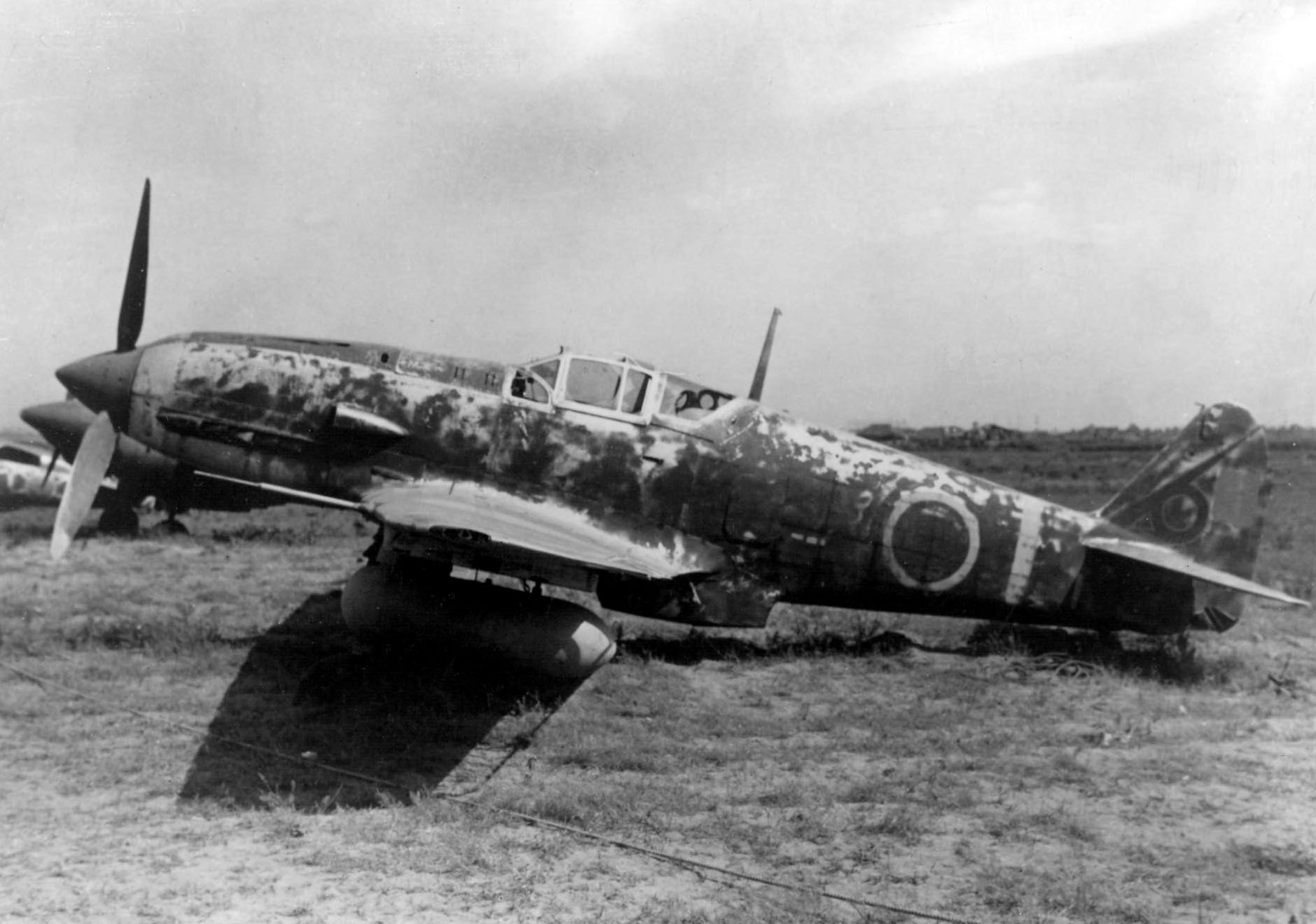
Kawasaki Ki-61 Hien with drop tank

The Kawasaki Ki-61 Hien (飛燕, "flying swallow") is a Japanese World War II fighter aircraft. Used by the Imperial Japanese Army Air Service, it was designated the "Army Type 3 Fighter" (三式戦闘機). Allied intelligence initially believed Ki-61s were Messerschmitt Bf 109s and later an Italian Macchi C.202, which led to the Allied reporting name of "Tony", assigned by the United States War Department. The design originated as a variant of the Kawasaki Ki-60, which never entered production. The Ki-61 became the only mass-produced Japanese fighter of the war to use a liquid-cooled inverted V engine. Over 3,000 Ki-61s were produced. Initial prototypes saw action over Yokohama during the Doolittle Raid on 18 April 1942, and continued to fly combat missions throughout the war.

== Design and development ==
The Ki-61 was designed by Takeo Doi and his deputy Shin Owada in response to a late 1939 tender by the Koku Hombu (Note: Koku Hombu was the Technical Branch of the Imperial Army Air Headquarters.) for two fighters, each to be built around the Daimler-Benz DB 601Aa. Production aircraft would use a Kawasaki licensed DB 601, known as the Ha-40, which was to be manufactured at its Akashi plant. The Ki-60 was to be a heavily armed specialised interceptor, with a high wing loading; (Note: The Nakajima Ki-44 was selected as the standard IJAAF interceptor fighter and followed broadly similar specifications to the Ki-60.) the Ki-61 was to be a more lightly loaded and armed general-purpose fighter, intended to be used mainly in an offensive, air superiority role at low to medium altitudes. (Note: Nakajima designed a similar fighter, the Ki-62, also powered by an Ha-40. This design later became the basis for the Nakajima Ki-84.)

Both single-seat, single-engine fighters used the same basic construction: all-metal alloys with semi-monocoque fuselages and three-spar wings, with alloy-framed, fabric-covered ailerons, elevators and rudders. Priority was given to the Ki-60, which first flew in April 1941, while design work on the Ki-61 did not begin until December 1940. Although the Ki-61 was broadly similar to the Ki-60, it featured several refinements exploiting lessons learned from the disappointing flight characteristics of the earlier design.

The all-metal, semi-monocoque fuselage was basically oval in cross-section, changing to a tapered, semi-triangular oval behind the cockpit canopy, with a maximum depth of 1.35 m (4 ft 5 in). An unusual feature of the Ki-61 was that the engine bearers were constructed as an integral part of the forward fuselage, with the cowling side panels being fixed. For servicing or replacement, only the top and bottom cowling panels could be removed. A tapered, rectangular supercharger air intake was located on the port-side cowling. Behind the engine bulkhead were the ammunition boxes feeding a pair of synchronized 12.7 mm (.50 in) Ho-103 machine guns which were set in a "staggered" configuration (the port weapon slightly further forward than that to starboard) in a bay just above and behind the engine. The breeches partly projected into the cockpit, above the instrument panel. The Ho-103 was a light weapon for its caliber (around 23 kg/51 lb) and fired a light shell, but this was compensated for by its rapid rate of fire. The ammunition capacity was limited, having only around 250 rounds for each weapon. A self-sealing fuel tank with a capacity of 165 L (44 US gal) was located behind the pilot's seat. The windshield was armored and there was a 13 mm (.51 in) armor plate behind the pilot. The radiator and oil cooler for the liquid-cooled engine were in a ventral location below the fuselage and wing trailing edge, covered by a rectangular section fairing with a large, adjustable exit flap.

The evenly-tapered wings had an aspect ratio of 7.2 with a gross area of 20 m^{2} (220 ft^{2}) and featured three spars; a Warren truss main spar and two auxiliary spars. The rear spar carried the split flaps and long, narrow-chord ailerons, while the front spar incorporated the undercarriage pivot points. The undercarriage track was relatively wide at 4 m (13 ft 1 in). Each wing had a partially self-sealing 190 L (50 US gal) fuel tank behind the main spar, just outboard of the fuselage. A single weapon (initially a 7.7 mm/0.303 in Type 89 machine gun) was able to be carried in a weapons bay located behind the main spar.

The first prototype of the San-shiki-Sentohki ichi gata ("Type 3 Fighter, Model 1", the official IJAAF designation) first flew in December 1941 at Kagamigahara Airfield. Although test pilots were enthusiastic about its self-sealing fuel tanks, upgraded armament, and good dive performance, the wing loading of 146.3 kg/m^{2} (30 lb/ft^{2}) at an all-up weight of 2,950 kg (6,500 lb) was viewed with scepticism by many of the senior officers of the Koku Hombu, who still believed in the light, highly manoeuvrable, lightly armed fighter epitomised by the then new Nakajima Ki-43-I-Hei which had a wing loading of 92.6 kg/m^{2} (19 lb/ft^{2}) (and even that was considered borderline compared to the earlier Ki-27).

To address these concerns, Kawasaki staged a fly-off between two Ki-61 prototypes and the Nakajima Ki-43-I, a pre-production Nakajima Ki-44-I, a defector-flown Lavochkin-Gorbunov-Goudkov LaGG-3, a Messerschmitt Bf 109E-7, and a captured Curtiss P-40E Warhawk. The Ki-61 proved the fastest of all the aircraft and was inferior only to the Ki-43 in manoeuvrability.

The Ki-61 was the last of the fighters powered by the DB-601 or its foreign derivatives, and it was soon overshadowed by fighters with more powerful engines. By the time it first flew in December 1941, one year after the Macchi C.202's first flight and three years after the first Bf 109E, the engine was already underpowered compared to the new 1,120 kW (1,500 hp) inline or 1,491 kW (1,999 hp) radial engines being developed (and already nearing the mass-production stage) to power the next generation of combat aircraft such as the Republic P-47 Thunderbolt. Moreover, the inline Ha-40 engine proved to be an unreliable powerplant, exacerbated in the South Pacific campaign, where high temperatures caused problems with the fuel pumps.

The DB-601 engine required precise and sophisticated manufacturing; the Ha-40 was lighter by roughly 30 kg (66 lb) and required even higher manufacturing standards. Reaching these standards proved difficult for Japanese manufacturers, an issue further complicated by the variable quality of materials, fuel, and the lubricants needed to run a sensitive, high-performance engine. The Japanese equivalent of the more powerful DB-605 engine was the Kawasaki Ha-140, which was fitted onto the Type 3 to produce the Ki-61-II high-altitude interceptor.

Compared to the Ki-61-I, the Ki-61-II had 10% greater wing area, used more armour and was powered by the Kawasaki Ha-140 engine generating 1,120 kW (1,500 hp). After overcoming initial fuselage and wing stability problems, the new interceptor reverted to the original wing and was put into service as the Ki-61-II-KAI. However, the Ha-140 engine had severe reliability problems that were never fully resolved, and around half of the first batch of engines delivered were returned to the factory to be re-built. A US bombing raid on 19 January 1945 destroyed the engine factory in Akashi, Hyōgo, and 275 Ki-61-II-KAI airframes without engines were converted to use the Mitsubishi Ha-112-II radial engine, resulting in the Ki-100. While the Ha-112 solved the problems encountered with the Ha-140, the new engine still had a major weakness: a lack of power at altitude, which diminished its ability to intercept high-flying B-29 Superfortresses relative to the Ki-61-II.

During testing, the Hien proved capable, but several shortcomings were subsequently revealed in operational service, namely the armor protection that was insufficient against larger guns and a sub-standard engine that eventually led to a new engine being considered.

== Operational history ==
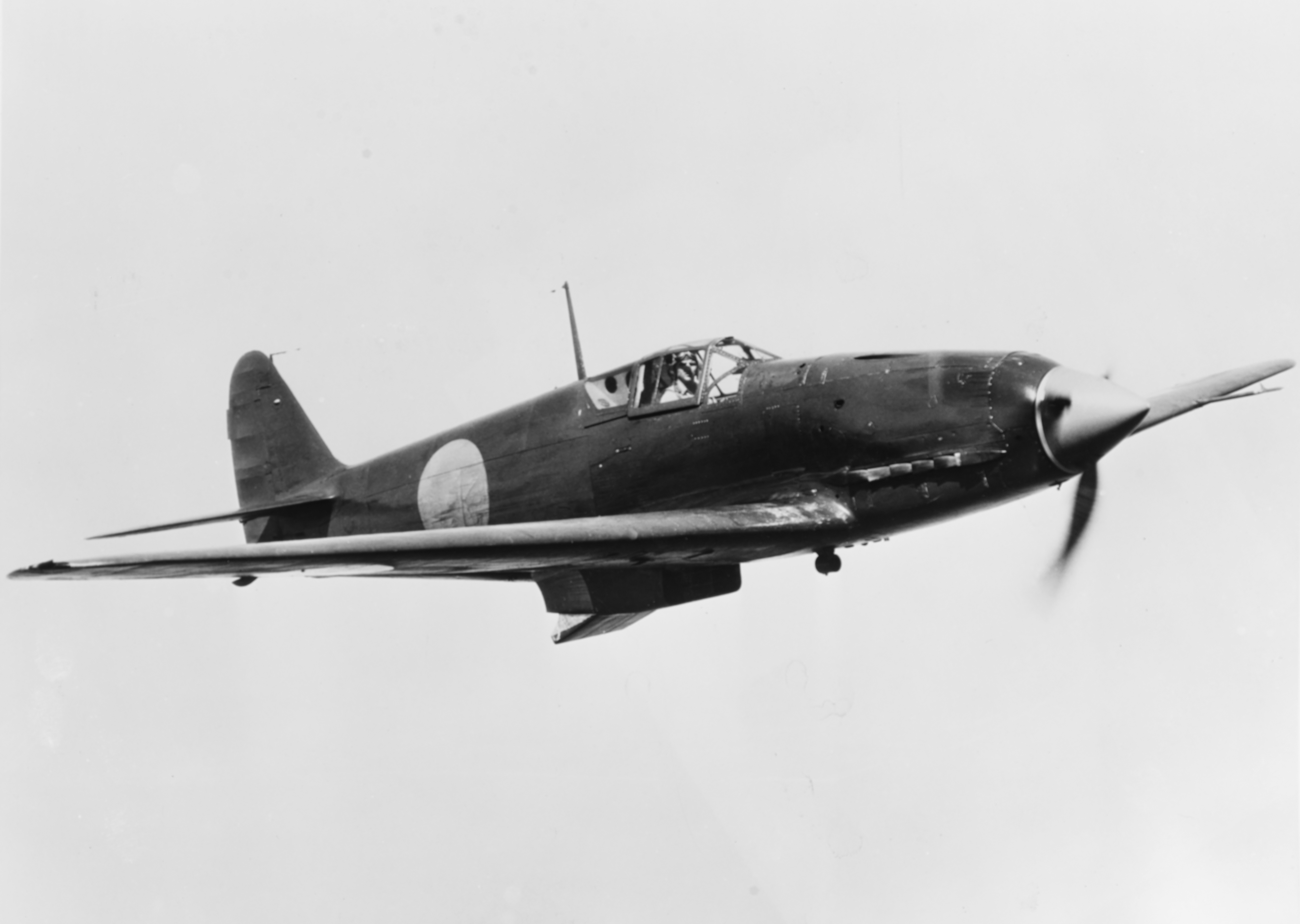
A captured Kawasaki Ki-61 fighter tested by the U.S. Navy Naval Air Test Center Patuxent River, Maryland (USA), in June 1945

The Ki-61 looked so different from the usual radial-engined Japanese fighters that the Allies at first believed it to be of German or Italian origin, possibly a license-built Messerschmitt Bf 109. The first Ki-61 seen by Allied aircrew had been misidentified as a Bf 109 by USAAF Capt. C. Ross Greening during the Doolittle Raid. In early reports, when it was thought to have been a German fighter, the Ki-61 had been code-named "Mike". The final, and better known code name adopted was "Tony", because the Ki-61 looked like an Italian aircraft.

The new Ki-61 Hien fighters entered service with a special training unit, the 23rd Chutai, and entered combat for the first time in early 1943, during the New Guinea campaign. The first Sentai (Air Group/Wing) fully equipped with the Hien was the 68th in Wewak, New Guinea, followed by the 78th Sentai stationed at Rabaul. Both units were sent into a difficult theatre where jungles and adverse weather conditions, coupled with a lack of spares, quickly undermined the efficiency of both men and machines. Because the Ki-61 was so new, and had been rushed into service, it inevitably suffered from teething problems. Almost all of the modern Japanese aircraft engines, especially the Ki-61's liquid-cooled engines, suffered a disastrous series of failures and ongoing problems, which resulted in the obsolescent Ki-43 still forming the bulk of the JAAF's fighter capability.

Initially, this campaign went successfully for the Japanese Army Air Force (JAAF), but when the Allies re-organized and enhanced the combat capabilities of their air forces, they gained the upper hand against the JAAF. High non-combat losses were also experienced by the Japanese during this campaign. For example, while in transit between Truk and Rabaul, the 78th lost 18 of its 30 Ki-61s. The finicky Ha-40 engine could not be overhauled in the theatre, instead they had to be shipped to the nearest service depot in Halmahera, in eastern Indonesia.

Even with these problems, there was some concern in Allied aviation circles regarding the Hien. The new Japanese fighter caused some pain and consternation among Allied pilots, particularly when they found out the hard way that they could no longer go into a dive and escape as they had from lighter Japanese fighters. General George Kenney, the Allied air forces commander in the Southwest Pacific, found his Curtiss P-40s completely outclassed, and begged for more Lockheed P-38 Lightnings to counter the threat of the new enemy fighter.

However, the increasing numerical strength of Allied bomber units, along with inadequate anti-aircraft systems, imposed crippling losses on Japanese units. Approximately 174 out of 200 Japanese aircraft based in the Wewak area were lost during the attacks of August 17–21 1943. By the end of the campaign, nearly 2,000 Japanese aircraft had been lost in air attacks from up to 200 Allied aircraft at a time, around half of which were Consolidated B-24 Liberators and North American B-25 Mitchells armed with fragmentation bombs. After the Japanese retreat, over 340 aircraft wrecks were later found at Hollandia.

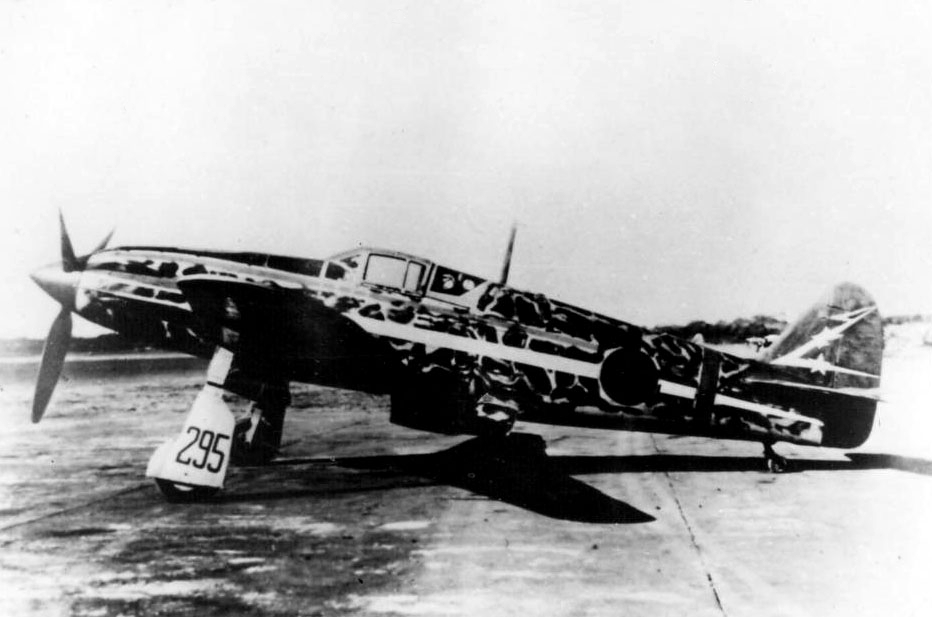
Capt. Teruhiko Kobayashi's Ki-61 of the 244th Sentai

The Ki-61 was also utilised in Southeast Asia, Okinawa, China and as an interceptor during US bombing raids over the Japanese home islands, including against Boeing B-29 Superfortresses. The Ki-61 was notable for many reasons: initially identified as of either German or Italian origin, these aircraft were capable of matching Allied aircraft such as the P-40 in speed, and as evaluation had already shown, were superior in almost every respect. However, the armament of the early Hien was lighter, but still sufficient for most purposes. Some authors claim that the Lockheed P-38 Lightning was measurably superior. The Ki-61 carried a great deal of fuel, but due to having self-sealing fuel tanks it was not considered readily flammable, as many other Japanese aircraft were.

Owing to the additional weight, the Ki-61's performance and agility suffered when its armament was increased, but it still remained capable with a 580 km/h (310 kn) maximum speed. The cannon armament was needed to counter the Allied bombers, which proved to be difficult to shoot down with only 12.7 mm (.50 in) machine guns. The empty and maximum weights for the Ki-61 prototype (2 × 12.7 mm/0.50 in + 2 × 7.7 mm/0.303 in) were 2,238 kg (4,934 lb) and 2,950 kg (6,504 lb), respectively; for the Ki-61-I basic (4 × 12.7 mm/.50 in) 3,130 kg (6,900 lb); and for the Ki-61-KAI (2 × 12.7 mm/0.50 in + 2 × 20 mm), 2,630 kg (5,798 lb) and 3,470 kg (6,750 lb).

A number of Ki-61s were also used in Tokkotai (kamikaze) missions launched toward the end of the war. The Ki-61 was delivered to 15th Sentai (group/wing), as well as some individual Chutaicho (Squadron Leaders) in other Sentai, and even to operational training units in the JAAF. The aircraft was largely trouble-free in service except for the liquid-cooled engine which tended to overheat when idling on the ground and suffered from oil circulation and bearing problems.

=== Ki-61 Special Attack Unit ===
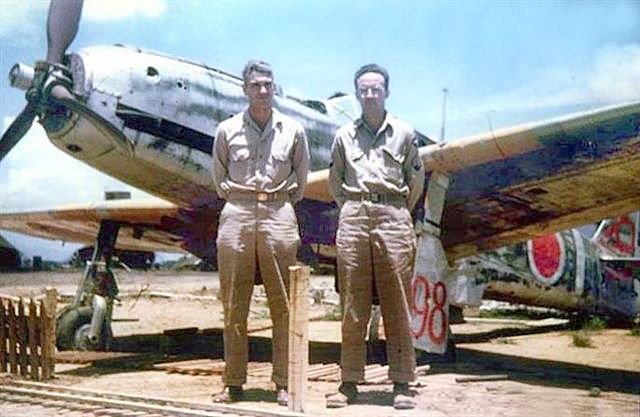
An ex-23rd Sentai, 2nd Chutai Ki-61 found and photographed at Inba airbase by USAAF personnel in 1946.

The tactic of using aircraft to ram American Boeing B-29 Superfortresses was first recorded in late August 1944, when B-29s from Chinese airfields attempted to bomb the steel factories at Yawata. Sergeant Shigeo Nobe of the 4th Sentai intentionally flew his Kawasaki Ki-45 into a B-29; debris from the explosion severely damaged another B-29, which also went down. (Note: The B-29s were Colonel Robert Clinksale's B-29-BW 42-6334 Gertrude C and Captain Ornell Stauffer's B-29-BW 42-6368 Calamity Sue, both from the 468th BG.) Other attacks of this nature followed, as a result of which individual pilots determined it was a practicable way of destroying B-29s.

On 7 November 1944, the officer commanding the 10th Hiko Shidan (Air division) made ramming attacks a matter of policy by forming ramming attack flights specifically to oppose the B-29s at high altitude. The aircraft were stripped of their fuselage armament and protective systems in order to attain the required altitudes. Although the term "kamikaze" is often used to refer to the pilots undertaking these attacks, the word was not used by the Japanese military.

The units assigned to the 10th Hiko Shidan included the 244th Hiko Sentai (Fighter group), then commanded by Captain Takashi Fujita, who organised a ramming flight called "Hagakure-Tai" ("Special Attack Unit"), which was composed out of volunteers from the three Chutai (squadrons) of the 244th: the 1st Chutai "Soyokaze", 2nd Chutai "Toppu", and the 3rd Chutai known as "Mikazuki".

First Lieutenant Toru Shinomiya was selected to lead the Hagakure-Tai. On 3 December 1944, Shinomiya – along with Sergeant Masao Itagaki and Sergeant Matsumi Nakano – intercepted a B-29 raid; Shinomaya rammed one B-29, but was able to land his damaged Ki-61, which had lost most of the port outer wing, back at base. After attacking another B-29 Itagaki had to parachute from his damaged fighter, while Nakano rammed and damaged Long Distance of the 498th BG and crash-landed his stripped-down Ki-61 in a field. Shinomaya's damaged Ki-61 was later displayed inside Tokyo's Matsuya department store while Nakano's Ki-61 was displayed outside, alongside of a life-size cut-away drawing of the forward fuselage of a B-29. (Note: Shinomaya eventually lost his life as a Tokkotai pilot in the battle for Okinawa.) These three pilots were the first recipients of the Bukosho, Japan's equivalent to the Victoria Cross or Medal of Honor, which had been inaugurated on 7 December 1944 as an Imperial Edict by Emperor Hirohito (there are 89 known recipients, most of whom fought and scored against B-29s). The existence of the ramming unit had been kept confidential until then, but it was officially disclosed in the combat results announcement and officially named "Shinten Seiku Tai" ("Body Attack Detachment") by the Defense GHQ. On 27 January 1945, Itakagi survived another ramming attack on a B-29, again parachuting to safety, and received a second Bukosho; he survived the war as only one of two known double-Bukosho recipients. Sergeant Shigeru Kuroishikawa was another distinguished member of the unit.

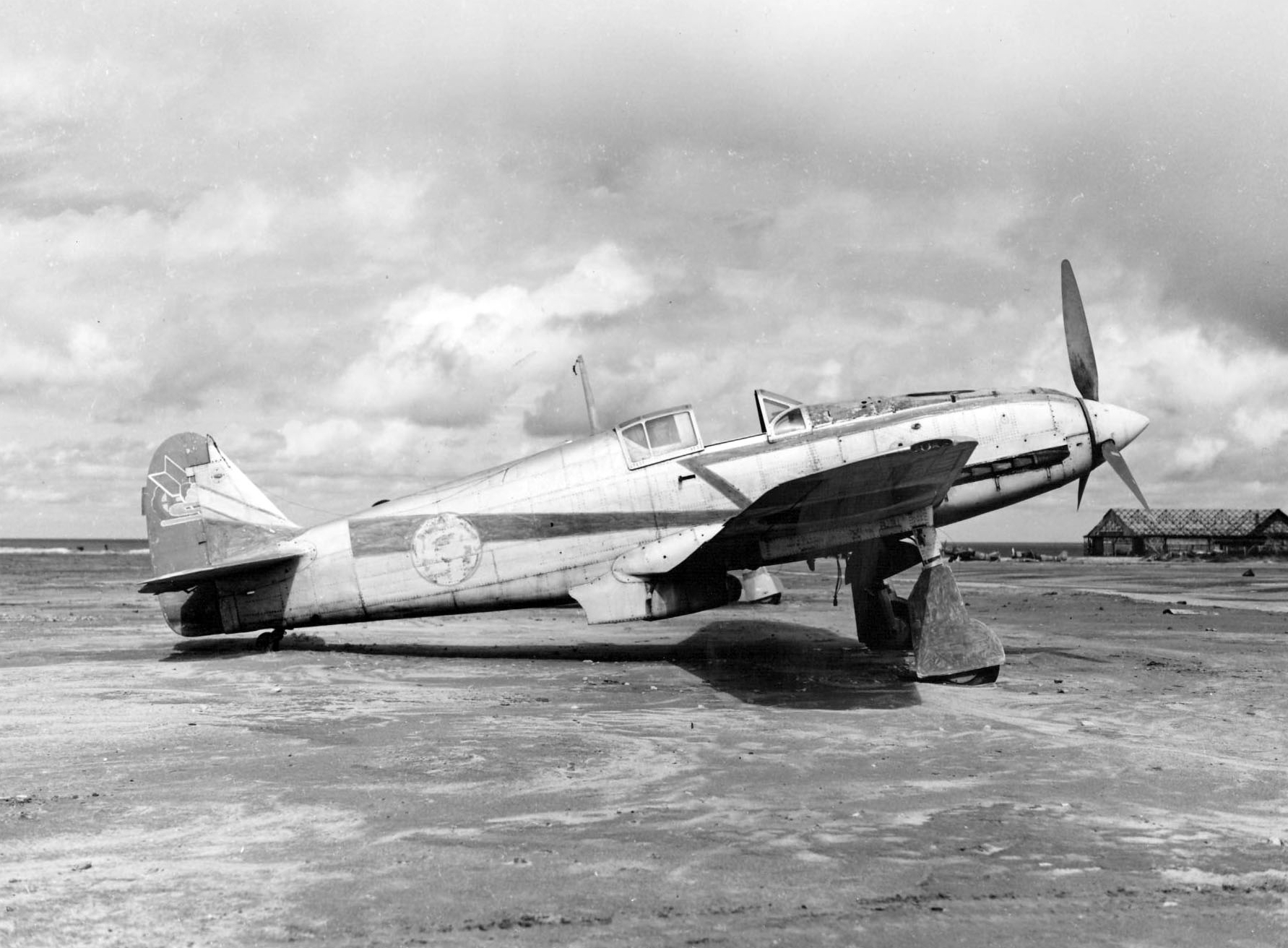
A Ki-61 of the 149th shumbutai, taken in Ashiya after the war. The tail markings indicate it formerly came from the Akeno Kyodo Hikoshidan and the 59th sentai before being allocated to the 149th.

Despite their successful attacks, these pilots gained no reprieve and were obliged to continue these deadly and dangerous ramming tactics until they were killed or wounded so badly that they could no longer fly. They were regarded as doomed men and were celebrated among the ranks of those who were going to certain death as Tokkotai (kamikaze) pilots.

Some other Ki-61 pilots also achieved renown, among them Major Teruhiko Kobayashi of the 244th Sentai, who was credited by some with a dozen victories mostly due to conventional attacks against B-29s.

== Variants ==
Note: Ko, Otsu, Hei and Tei are the Japanese equivalents to a, b, c, d. Kai ('modified' or 'improved') was also used for some models of the Ki-61.

Ki-61-Hien

- Ki-61 Prototypes: 12 built
- Ki-61-I-Ko First production version: fully retractable tailwheel, two 7.7 mm (0.303 in) Type 89 machine guns in the wings and two synchronized 12.7 mm (0.50 in) Ho-103 machine guns in the forward decking. Capable of carrying one 151 L (40 gal) drop tank or a light bomb.
- Ki-61-I-Otsu Second production fighter variant: Tailwheel retraction mechanism was unreliable, the aircraft was modified accordingly. Two 12.7 mm (.50 in) Ho-103 machine guns replaced the wing 7.7 mm (.303 in) machine guns.
- Ki-61-I-Hei: The Hei was built in conjunction with the Otsu variant, the wing machine guns were replaced by Mauser MG 151/20 cannons.
- Ki-61-I-Tei Fighter variant with two fuselage mounted Japanese 20 mm Ho-5 cannon and two 12.7 mm (.50 in) wing mounted Ho-103 machine guns.
- Ki-61-I-KAId: Interceptor variant with 2 × 12.7 mm (.50 in) machine guns and 2 × 30 mm (1.18 in) Ho-155 wing cannon.
- Ki-61-I- w.c.e.s: Experimental aircraft with evaporation system, as used on the Heinkel He 100. It was the fastest Ki-61 built, achieving 630 km/h (395 mph).
- Ki-61-II Prototype with 1,500 PS (1,103 kW) Ha-140 engine and first flown in December 1943.
- Ki-61-II-KAI: Pre-production version which reverted to the Ki-61-I-Tei wing, a 220 mm (8.7 in) fuselage stretch, enlarged rudder, and Ha-140 engine; 30 built.
- Ki-61-II-KAIa: Armed with 2 x 12.7 mm (.50 in) machine guns in the wings and 2 x 20 mm cannon in the fuselage.
- Ki-61-II-KAIb: Armed with 4 x 20 mm cannon.
- Ki-61-III Prototype: This version had a cut-down rear fuselage and a canopy design which was later used by the Ki-100-I-Otsu

=== Production ===
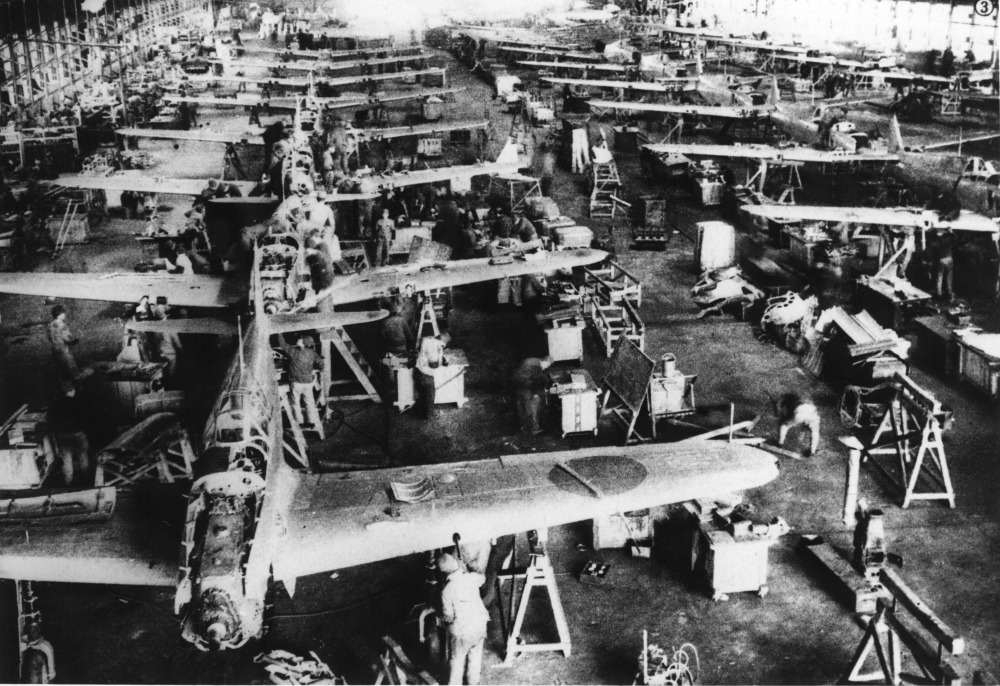
Assembly of Ki-61s at Kawasaki Aircraft Company's Gifu plant, 1944.

Ki-61-I Production: Kawasaki Kokuki K.K
Year
Year	Jan.	Feb.	Mar.	Apr.	May	June	July	Aug.	Sept.	Oct.	Nov.	Dec.	Annual
1942								1	3	5	10	15	34
1943	22	32	31	37	44	40	53	60	70	87	104	130	710
1944	150	156	145	142	118	236	254	198	164	174	101	53	1,891
1945	19												19
Total													2,654

Not included:

- Pre-production started with the first prototype completed in July 1941, and with further eleven builds in early 1942.

Ki-61-II Production: Kawasaki Kokuki K.K
Year
Year	Jan.	Feb.	Mar.	Apr.	May	June	July	Aug.	Sept.	Oct.	Nov.	Dec.	Annual
1944	1	3	26	0	0	0	0	1	26	41	71	70	239
1945	68	56	15	19	7								165
Total													404

Note:

- Out of 374 Ki-61-II builds, 275 were completed as Ki-100 Ia.

Not included:

- Pre-production started with eight prototypes completed during Aug. 1943 to Jan. 1944.

Total production:
According to USSBS Report: 3,058	Figure includes: 2,654 Ki-61-I and 404 Ki-61-II builds
According to Francillon: 3,078	Figure includes: 2,666 Ki-61-I and 412 Ki-61-II builds

== Operators ==
Japan

- Imperial Japanese Army Air Service

Post War

China

- Chinese Nationalist Air Force - Operated some captured aircraft

China

- People's Liberation Army Air Force - also operated some captured aircraft

Indonesia

- In 1945, Indonesian Air Force –then Indonesian People's Security Force (IPSF) (Indonesian pro-independence guerrillas)– captured six such aircraft at numerous Japanese air bases, including Bugis Air Base in Malang (repatriated 18 September 1945). At least one was restored. Most aircraft were destroyed in military conflicts between the Netherlands and the newly proclaimed-Republic of Indonesia during the Indonesian National Revolution of 1945–1949.

=== Ki-61 units ===
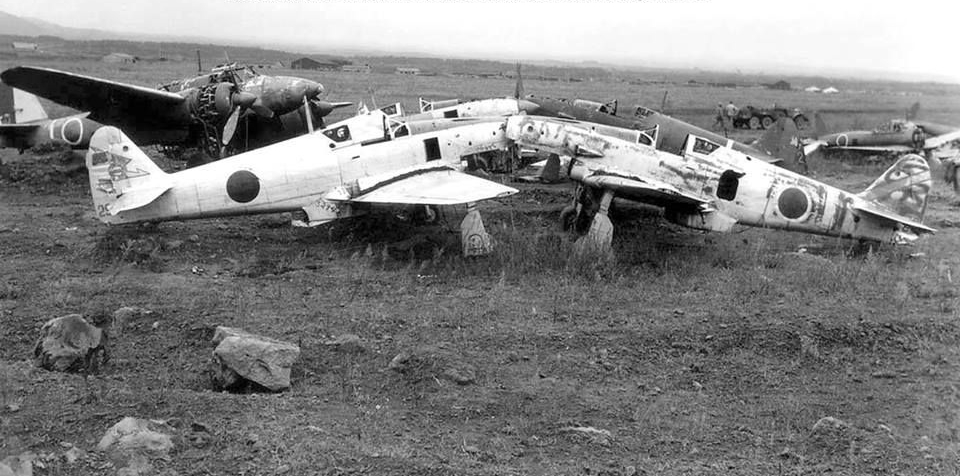
Derelict Ki-61s in 1945 after the surrender. A Kawasaki Ki-45 heavy fighter is in the background.

The Hiko Sentai, usually referred to as Sentai, was the basic operational unit of the Imperial Japanese Army Air Force, composed of three or more Chutai (companies or squadrons). A Sentai had 27 to 49 aircraft, with each Chutai having 16 aircraft and pilots plus a maintenance and repair unit. Several sentai had other units under their operational control, most notably the Hagakure-Tai ("Special Attack Units") of the 244th Sentai. By 1944, with the depredations of Allied attacks on supply lines and airfields, as well as the loss of pilots and aircraft through combat attrition and accidents, few sentai were able to operate at full strength.

Units operating the Ki-61 "Hien"
Sentai	Established	Aircraft type(s)	Area of operations	Disbanded	Notes
17th	10 February 1944 at Kagamigahara, Gifu Prefecture (Note: There is an inconsistency in the locations given; Kagamigahara is (wrongly) listed by Sakaida as being in the Saitama Prefecture, which is north of Gifu)	Ki-61, Ki-100	Philippines, Formosa, Japan	End of war	One of Kawasaki's main factories was located at Kagamigahara which, in 1944 was not yet a city.
18th	10 February 1944 at Chōfu from the 244th Sentai	Ki-61, Ki-100	Philippines, Japan	End of War	Lt Mitsuo Oyake won Bukosho for shooting down three B-29s (one by ramming) 7 April 1945 and damaging three others.
19th	10 February 1944 at Akeno Fighter School	Ki-61	Indonesia, Philippines, Formosa, Okinawa	End of War (Formosa)	
23rd	11 October 1944 at Inba, Chiba Prefecture	Ki-43, Ki-44, Ki-61	Iwo Jima, Formosa, Japan	End of war (Inba)	
26th	Late 1944	Ki-51, Ki-43, Ki-61	Formosa	End of war (Formosa)	
28th	June 1939 in Manchuria	Ki-46, Ki-61, Ki-102	Manchuria, Japan	July 1945	
31st	July 1938 in China	Ki-10, Ki-43, Ki-61	Manchuria, Philippines	30 May 1945 at Singapore	
33rd	Summer 1937 in China	Ki-10, Ki-27, Ki-43, Ki-61	New Guinea, Manchuria (Manchoukuo), East Indies	End of war, Medan, Dutch East Indies (currently Indonesia)	
53rd	23 March 1944 at Tokorozawa, Saitama	Ki-61, Ki-45	Japan, Eastern Defence Sector		flew Ki-61 for a short time in Home Island Defence
55th	30 May 1944 at Taishō, Osaka Prefecture	Ki-61	Philippines, Japan	End of war at Sana, Nara Prefecture	
56th	August 1944 at Taishō Osaka Prefecture	Ki-61	Japan	End of war at Itami, Hyōgo Prefecture	Unit claimed 11 B-29s for 30 pilots lost. Warrant Officer Tadao Sumi (five B-29s plus one P-51 Mustang destroyed, four B-29s damaged) Bukosho recipient.
59th	1 July 1938 at Kagamigahara, Gifu Prefecture	Ki-10, Ki-27, Ki-43, Ki-61, Ki-100	China, Manchuria (Nomonhan), Indochina, East Indies, New Guinea, Okinawa, Japan	End of War at Ashiya, Fukuoka Prefecture	1st Lieutenant Naoyuki Ogata Bukosho recipient. Warrant Officer Kazuo Shimizu flew with unit from February 1942 right through to August 1945; 18 victories, including nine bombers.
65th	presumably 1938-1939	Ki-32, Ki-51, Ki-43, Ki-61, Ki-45	Philippines, Formosa, Okinawa, Japan	End of war, Metabaru, Saga	Unit used Ki-61 from the summer of 1944
68th	March 1942 at Harbin, Manchuria	Ki-27, Ki-61	Rabaul (New Britain), New Guinea, Halmahera	25 July 1944	First unit to convert to the Ki-61. Unit was destroyed by Allied air forces in New Guinea. Most surviving ground and aircrew were used as infantry, with few survivors. A Ki-61-1-Otsu, manufacturer's No. 640 is one of the best preserved aircraft wrecks in New Guinea. Captain Shogo Takeuchi transferred from 64th Sentai, April 1942. KIA 15 December 1943 30+ victories. Sgt. Susumu Kaijinami officially credited with eight victories plus 16 unofficially.
78th	31 March 1942 in China	Ki-27, Ki-61	Manchuria, Rabaul, New Guinea	25 July 1944	Second unit to convert to the Ki-61. Unit was destroyed by Allied air forces in New Guinea. Most surviving ground and aircrew were used as infantry, with few survivors.
105th	August 1944, Taichung, Formosa	Ki-61	Okinawa, Formosa	End of war (Formosa)	
244th	April 1942, reorganised from 144th Sentai	Ki-27, Ki-61, Ki-100	Okinawa, Formosa	End of war (Yokaichi, Shiga Prefecture)	Nine Bukosho recipients. Major Teruhiko Kobayashi JAAF's youngest Sentai commander. Also had an air-to-air B-29 ramming unit. Sentai claimed 73 B-29s shot down plus 92 damaged. Most famous of the Home Defence Sentais. Captain Nagao Shirai considered the ranking ace of 244 Sentai and possibly leading B-29 "killer" of JAAF (11 B-29s) plus two Grumman F6F Hellcats destroyed, six other aircraft damaged using Ki-61 and Ki-100. Captain Chuichi Ichikawa nine B-29s plus one F6F destroyed, six B-29s damaged. Major Teruhiko Kobayashi, three B-29s plus two F6Fs destroyed.
Training units					
23rd Dokuritsu Dai Shijugo (Independent Chutai)	Chōfu, 1941	Ki-61	Japan	Became basis of 23rd Sentai	Evaluation and conversion unit for Ki-61.
Akeno Kyodo Hikoshidan (Akeno Flight School)	Akeno, Mie Prefecture, 1935	Ki-10, Ki-27, Ki-43, Ki-44, Ki-45, Ki-61, Ki-84, Ki-100	Japan	End of war	Main flight training school for Army fighter pilots. Many of the instructors participated in missions in defence of Japan 1944–1945. Akeno Airbase still in operational use.
37th Kyoiku Hikōtai (Flight Training Company)	Matsuyama airfield, Formosa, 1943	Ki-43, Ki-44, Ki-45, Ki-61, Ki-84	Formosa	End of war	Flight training school for Army fighter pilots. Many of the instructors participated in missions in defence of Japan 1944–1945

== Surviving aircraft ==
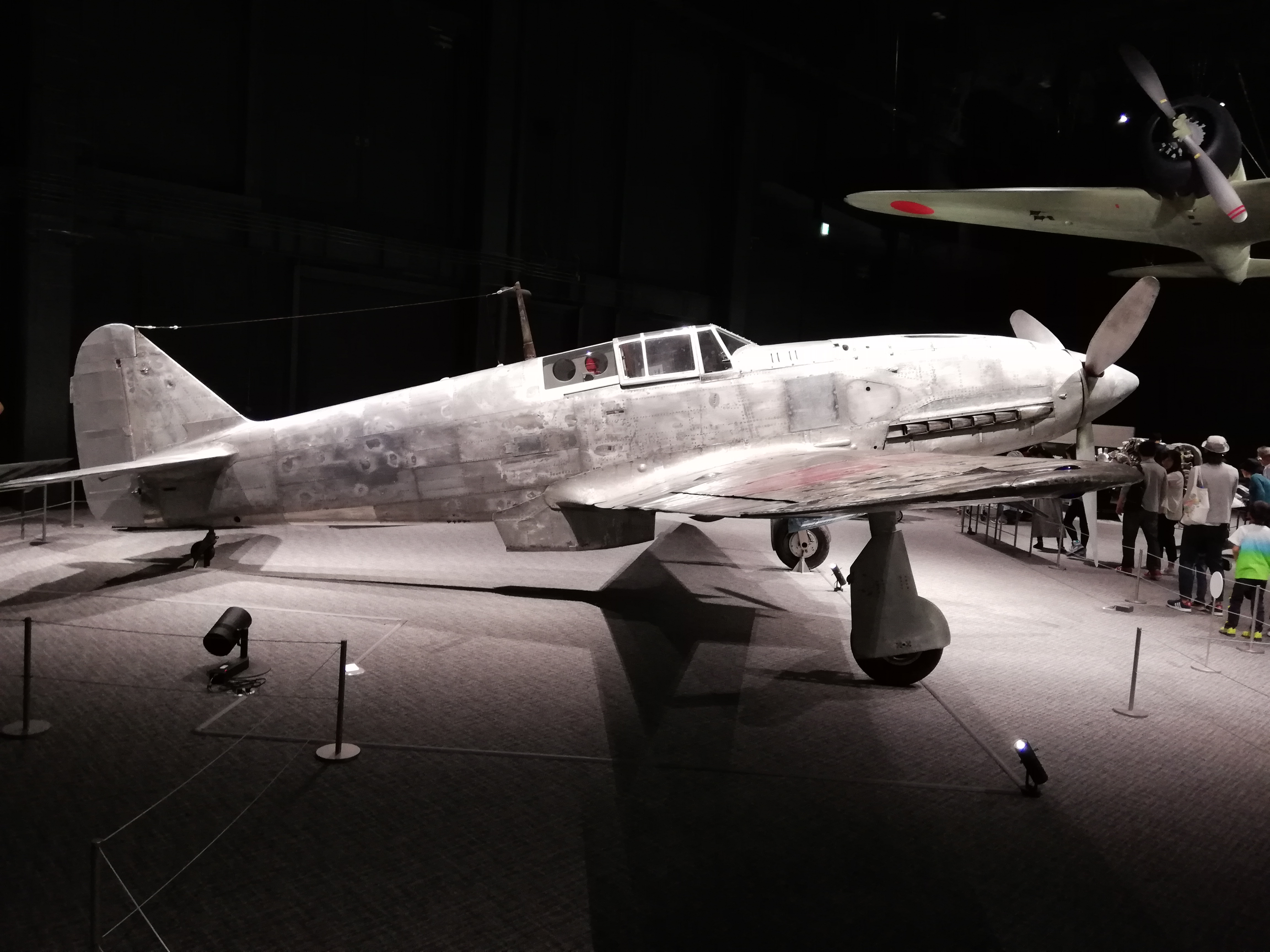
Ki-61-II-kai 6117 on display at the Kakamigahara Air and Space Museum, Kakamigahara, Gifu.

- 299 – Ki-61-Ia under restoration to static display at Ardmore, Auckland, New Zealand by AvSpecs. To be displayed at Papua New Guinea National Museum and Art Gallery once completed.
- 379 – Ki-61-I in storage at the Fantasy of Flight in Polk City, Florida.
- 640 – Ki-61-I under restoration to airworthy condition at Ardmore, Auckland, New Zealand by AvSpecs. It will become part of the Military Aviation Museum collection in Virginia Beach, Virginia.
- 6117 – Ki-61-II-Kai on static display at the Kakamigahara Air and Space Museum in Kakamigahara, Gifu. Previously on display at the Chiran Peace Museum for Kamikaze Pilots in Chiran, Kagoshima; it was removed from the museum in September 2015 and restored by Kawasaki Heavy Industries from 2015 to 2016.

== Specifications (Ki-61-I-KAIc) ==
3-view drawing of Kawasaki Ki-61

Data from Japanese Aircraft of the Pacific War

General characteristics

- Crew: 1
- Length: 8.94 m (29 ft 4 in)
- Wingspan: 12 m (39 ft 4 in)
- Height: 3.7 m (12 ft 2 in)
- Wing area: 20 m^{2} (220 sq ft)
- Airfoil: NACA 2R 16 wing root, NACA 24009 tip
- Empty weight: 2,630 kg (5,798 lb)
- Gross weight: 3,470 kg (7,650 lb)
- Fuel capacity:
- Internal 550 L (150 US gal; 120 imp gal)
- External 2x 200 L (53 US gal; 44 imp gal)
- Powerplant: 1 × Kawasaki Ha40 inverted liquid-cooled V-12 piston engine, 864 kW (1,159 hp)
- Propellers: 3-bladed variable pitch propeller

Performance

- Maximum speed: 580 km/h (360 mph, 310 kn) at 5,000 m (16,000 ft)
- Range: 580 km (360 mi, 310 nmi)
- Service ceiling: 11,600 m (38,100 ft)
- Rate of climb: 15.2 m/s (2,990 ft/min)
- Time to altitude: 7.0 min to 5,000 m (16,000 ft)
- Wing loading: 173.5 kg/m^{2} (35.5 lb/sq ft)
- Power/mass: 0.25 kW/kg (0.15 hp/lb)

Armament

- Guns:
  - 2× 20 mm (0.79 in) Ho-5 cannon, 120 rpg
  - 2× 12.7 mm (0.50 in) Ho-103 machine guns, 250 rpg
- Bombs: 2× 250 kg (550 lb) bombs

== See also ==
Related development

- Kawasaki Ki-60
- Kawasaki Ki-100

Aircraft of comparable role, configuration, and era

- Curtiss P-40 Warhawk
- Dewoitine D.520
- Hawker Hurricane
- Heinkel He 100
- Lavochkin LaGG-3
- Macchi C.202
- Messerschmitt Bf 109
- Mikoyan-Gurevich MiG-3
- North American P-51 Mustang
- Supermarine Spitfire
- Weiss Manfréd WM-23 Ezüst Nyíl
- Yakovlev Yak-1

Related lists

- List of aircraft of World War II
- List of military aircraft of Japan
- List of aircraft of Japan, World War II
