= Kawasaki Ki-60 =

Japanese experimental fighter aircraft

Ki-60
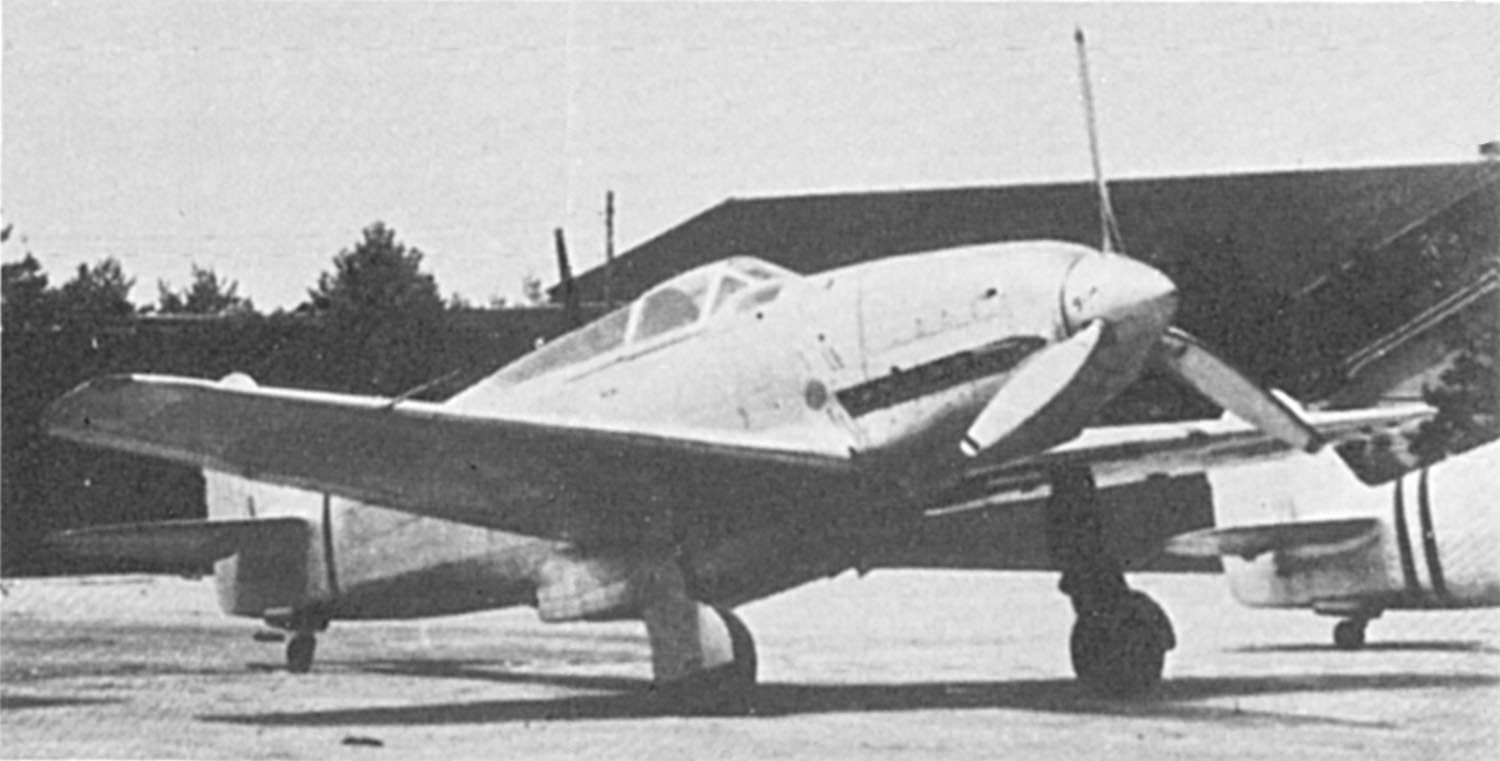
- The first of three prototype KI-60s.

General information
- Type: Fighter
- National origin: Japan
- Manufacturer: Kawasaki Kōkūki Kōgyō K.K.
- Status: Cancelled
- Number built: 3

History
- First flight: March 1941

The Kawasaki Ki-60 was an experimental Japanese pre-World War II fighter aircraft that used a license-built (Kawasaki) DB 601 liquid-cooled engine. This was, at that time, an unusual choice because the majority of Japanese aircraft at that time used air-cooled radial engines.

== Design and development ==
The Ki-60 was designed by Takeo Doi and his deputy Shin Owada of Kawasaki Aircraft Industries (川崎航空機工業株式会社, Kawasaki Kōkūki Kōgyō K.K.) in response to a 1939 Imperial Japanese Army Aviation Bureau requirement for a heavily armed, specialised interceptor fighter to be powered by the liquid-cooled Daimler-Benz DB 601 inverted V12 engine, which had been selected for license production by Kawasaki as the Ha-40. The emphasis in the requirements was for a high speed and a good rate of climb, along with a cannon armament. This was a complete change from the usual IJAAF penchant for lightly armed, highly manoeuvrable fighters with lightweight structures, epitomised by the Nakajima Ki-27 and the later Nakajima Ki-43. A requirement was issued at the same time for a lighter, less heavily armed, general-purpose fighter, which was to be designed almost in parallel with the Ki-60; this became the Ki-61. Priority was to be given to the Ki-60, design of which started in February 1940.

The first prototype of the Ki-60 emerged in March 1941 as a compact, all metal, stressed skin monoplane with a relatively deep fuselage (1.46 metres or 4 feet 9 inches) and tapered wings with rounded tips built around a system of three spars; a Warren truss main spar and two auxiliary spars. The rear spar carried the split flaps and long, narrow chord ailerons, while the front spar incorporated the undercarriage pivot points. The undercarriage track was 3 metres (9 ft 10 in). The pilot's seat was mounted high over the rear spar, giving the fuselage a distinctive "humped" profile; the hood featured a framed, rear sliding canopy and an elongated rear transparent section. The main coolant radiator was housed in a long ventral bath under the wing centre-section and central fuselage, while the oil cooler was mounted under the engine with a long air intake. The prototype was powered by an imported DB 601A, as production of the Ha-40 had not yet started. A total fuel capacity of 410 L (90.2 Imp gallons) was carried.

The armament carried was two synchronized, fuselage mounted 12.7 mm caliber Ho-103 machine guns, which were set in a "staggered" configuration (the port weapon slightly further forward than that to starboard) in a bay just above and behind the engine. One German made Mauser MG 151/20 20 mm cannon was housed in a weapons bay in each wing. With a normal loaded weight of 2,890 kilograms (6,370 lb) and a gross wing area of 1.48 m^{2} (15.9 sq ft) the wing loading was 181.76 kg/m^{2} (37.23 lb/ft^{2}), which was extremely high by Japanese standards (the standard IJAAF fighter, the Ki-27, had a wing loading of 70 kg/m^{2} (14.33 lb/ft^{2})).

From the start of flight testing, it became apparent that the design was seriously flawed in several key areas. The take-off run was unacceptably long, while, in flight, the aircraft displayed some lateral instability, excessively heavy controls, and poor control response. The spinning characteristics were described as "dangerous", and the stalling speed was extremely high. Although a top speed of 600 kilometres per hour (370 mph) had been projected the Ki-60 was only able to achieve 548 kilometres per hour (341 mph).

As a result, the second and third prototypes, which were still being built, were hurriedly modified in an attempt to mitigate some of the more undesirable traits. Approximately 100 kilograms (220 lb) were removed, primarily by replacing the MG 151 cannon with Ho-103 machine guns. This reduced the normal loaded weight to 2,750 kilograms (6,060 lb). Coupled with a slight increase in wing area to 1.5 m^{2} (16 sq ft), this resulted in a slightly lower wing loading of 169.7 kg/m^{2} (34.76 lb/ft^{2}). Detail changes were made to airframe sealing and to the contours of the air intakes and radiator bath. Flight tests were still disappointing, with both of the modified prototypes displaying most of the shortcomings of the first. A top speed of only 560 kilometres per hour (350 mph) was reached, with a climb rate still well below specifications. By this time, the Nakajima Ki-44, which had also been designed as a dedicated interceptor, was beginning to show some promise, and the Koku Hombu selected this in fulfilment of its requirements. From early 1941, the full attention of Takeo Doi and Shin Owada was focused on the Ki-61; the Ki-60 became important in that the Ki-61 design was able to be improved using the lessons learned from the poor characteristics of the Ki-60. Plans for production were cancelled in late 1941 after three airplanes had been built.

== Specifications (Ki-60 2nd prototype) ==
Data from Warplanes of the Second World War, Volume Three: Fighters;WW2 Aircraft Fact Files: Japanese Army Fighters, Part 1;Japanese Aircraft of the Pacific War

General characteristics

- Crew: 1
- Length: 8.47 m (27 ft 9 in)
- Wingspan: 10.5 m (34 ft 5 in)
- Height: 3.7 m (12 ft 2 in)
- Wing area: 16.2 m^{2} (174 sq ft) (1st prototype 15.9 m^{2} (171 sq ft))
- Empty weight: 2,150 kg (4,740 lb)
- Gross weight: 2,750 kg (6,063 lb) (1st prototype 2,890 kg (6,370 lb))
- Powerplant: 1 × Daimler-Benz DB 601A V-12 inverted liquid-cooled piston engine, 875 kW (1,173 hp) for take=off
- Propellers: 3-bladed Constant-speed propeller

Performance

- Maximum speed: 560 km/h (350 mph, 300 kn) at 4,500 m (14,800 ft)
- Service ceiling: 10,000 m (33,000 ft)
- Time to altitude: 1st prototype:5,000 m (16,000 ft) in 8 minutes; 2nd and 3rd prototypes 5,000 m (16,000 ft) in 6 minutes
- Wing loading: 169.8 kg/m^{2} (34.8 lb/sq ft)
- Power/mass: 0.310 kW/kg (0.189 hp/lb)

Armament

- Guns:
- 2 x 20 mm (0.787 in) Mauser MG 151 cannon or 2 x 12.7 mm (0.50 in) Ho-103 machine guns (3rd prototype) in the wings
- 2 x 12.7 mm (0.50 in) Ho-103 synchronized machine guns in the fuselage

== See also ==
- Engine cooling

Related development

- Kawasaki Ki-61

Related lists

- List of military aircraft of Japan
