= Kawasaki Ki-100 =

Japanese fighter aircraft

Ki-100
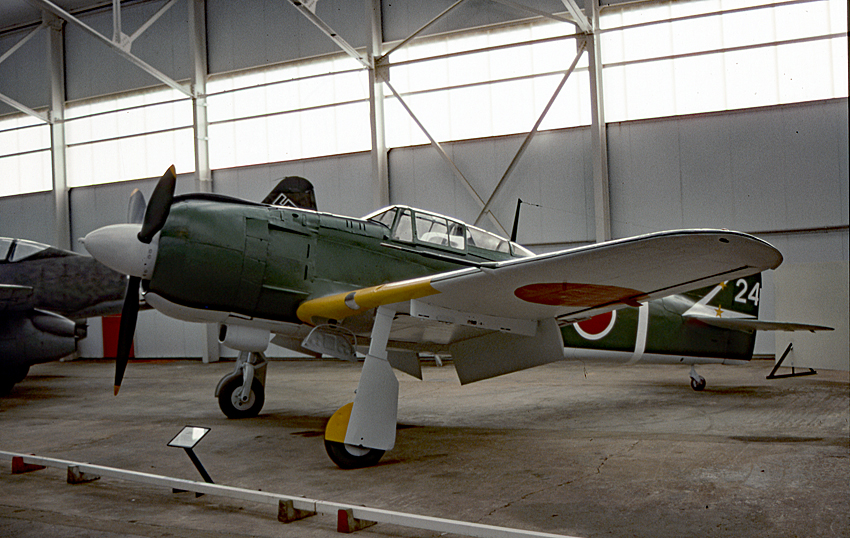
- Kawasaki Ki-100 1b at the Royal Air Force Museum Cosford

General information
- Type: Fighter/Interceptor
- National origin: Japan
- Manufacturer: Kawasaki Kokuki Kogyo K.K.
- Primary user: Imperial Japanese Army Air Service
- Number built: 396

History
- Manufactured: 1945
- Introduction date: 9 March 1945
- First flight: 1 February 1945
- Retired: August 1945
- Developed from: Kawasaki Ki-61

The Kawasaki Ki-100 (キ100) is a single-seat single-engine monoplane fighter aircraft used by the Imperial Japanese Army Air Service (IJAAS) during World War II. The Japanese Army designation was "Type 5 Fighter" (五式戦闘機, Go-shiki sentouki; or abbreviated as Goshikisen). It did not have an Allied code name.

In early 1945, 275 Ki-100s were modified from Ki-61s as an emergency measure to accept a 14-cylinder Mitsubishi Ha-112-II radial engine in place of the original Kawasaki Ha-40 inverted V-12 inline engine, resulting in one of the best interceptors used by the Army during the war. It combined excellent power and maneuverability, and from the first operational missions in March 1945 until the end of the war, it performed better than most IJAAS fighters against both United States Army Air Forces B-29 Superfortress bombers and P-51 Mustang fighters, as well as U.S. Navy F6F Hellcat carrier fighters.

A newly built variant, the Ki-100-Ib, was produced with a cut down rear fuselage during the last months of the war which equipped five home defence sentai. High-altitude performance was further improved with the final variant, the Ki-100-II, however only three of these were produced before the war ended and this final variant never saw operational service.

== Design and development ==
The Ki-100 was a stressed-skin cantilever low-wing single-seat enclosed-cockpit radial engine monoplane fighter with retractable undercarriage. Control surfaces were fabric covered.

=== Ki-61 engine problems ===
In mid-1944, the Ki-61 was one of the best fighters of the Imperial Japanese Army Air Service (IJAAS). It was also the only production Japanese fighter to have an inline powerplant, the V-12 Kawasaki Ha-40, a Japanese adaptation of the German Daimler-Benz DB 601 engine, as well as one of the first with factory-installed armor and self-sealing fuel tanks. It also had a respectable performance, in line with contemporary American designs, with speed and rate of climb emphasized instead of manoeuvrability and range. It was an effective design, but suffered from engine shortages and reliability problems. These problems led to the development of an improved model, the Ki-61-II (later Ki-61-II-KAI), powered by the improved 1,120 kW (1,500 hp) Kawasaki Ha-140 inverted V-12 engine, which was heavier than the Ha-40 it replaced. Maximum speed increased from 590 to 610 km/h (370 to 380 mph) and aside from the rate of climb, general performance was improved as well. However, it never performed as expected due to continued quality control problems with the engine, while far fewer engines were produced than required.

=== Ha-112 radial engine ===
At this point of the war, the IJAAS was in desperate need of effective interceptors to stop bombing raids over the Japanese mainland, so in October 1944 a decision was made to use the 1,120 kW (1,500 hp) Mitsubishi Ha-112-II (Kinsei ["Venus"] 60 series), a 14-cylinder, two-row radial engine. The need for a new engine became urgent on 19 January 1945, when a bombing raid destroyed the Ha-140 production plant, leaving 275 otherwise complete Ki-61s engineless.

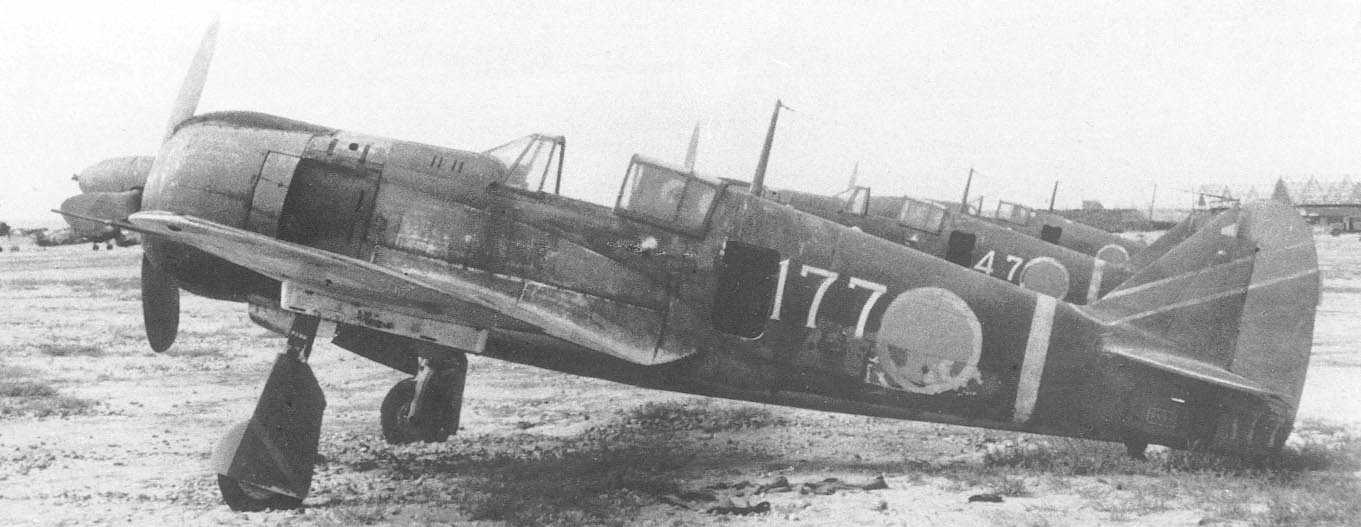
Ki-100-I-Ko Army Fighter Type 5 Mark 1a of 59th Sentai showing original faired rear fuselage

The Mitsubishi Ha-112-II was 54 kg (119 lb) lighter than the Ha-140 and developed the same power but with much greater reliability. Three Ki-61-II-KAIs were modified to carry this engine as prototypes. Chief engineer Takeo Doi with two other engineers redesigned the Ki-61 airframe to accept the new engine. Their solution was to use a second skin to form a fairing riveted to the fuselage to smooth out the airflow behind the cooling flaps and multiple exhaust stubs of the new engine cowling. As this engine was lighter, they were able to remove the lead counterweight in the tail that balanced out the heavier Ha-140 engine.

The new model was flown for the first time on 1 February 1945. Without the need for the heavy coolant radiator and other fittings required for a liquid-cooled engine, the Ki-100 was 329 kg (725 lb) lighter than the Ki-61-II, reducing the wing loading from 189 kg/m^{2} (38.8 lb/ft^{2}) to 175 kg/m^{2} (35.8 lb/ft^{2}). This had a positive effect on the flight characteristics, enhancing landing and takeoff qualities as well as improving manoeuvrability and reducing the turning radius. During March and April 1945, experienced instructors from the Akeno Army Flying School flew the Ki-100 in extensive tests against the Ki-84, which was the best IJAAS fighter then in operational service. Their conclusions were that, given pilots of equal experience, the Ki-100 would always win in combat.

The flight characteristics of the plane surpassed the Hien's in all but maximum speed, which was reduced by 29 km/h (18 mph) by the larger cross sectional area of the radial engine, and the model was ordered into production as the Goshikisen (Go=five; shiki=type; sentoki=fighter) or Army Fighter Type 5. The company's designation for it was Ki-100-I-Ko. All Ki-100-I-Ko were converted from existing Ki-61-II Kai and Ki-61-III airframes. The integral engine mount and cowling was cut off and a tubular steel engine mount was bolted to the firewall. Some redundant fittings from the liquid-cooled engine, such as the radiator shutter actuator, were left in place. The first 271 aircraft with the original faired rear fuselage were rolled out of the factory between March and June 1945.

In contrast to the unreliable engines used by the Kawanishi N1K-J, Kawasaki Ki-61 and Nakajima Ki-84 that were keeping many of these aircraft grounded, the new engine was much more reliable. Although its maximum speed in level flight was a bit slow for 1945, the Ki-100 could dive with North American P-51 Mustangs and maintain speed after pullout, unlike most Japanese fighters.

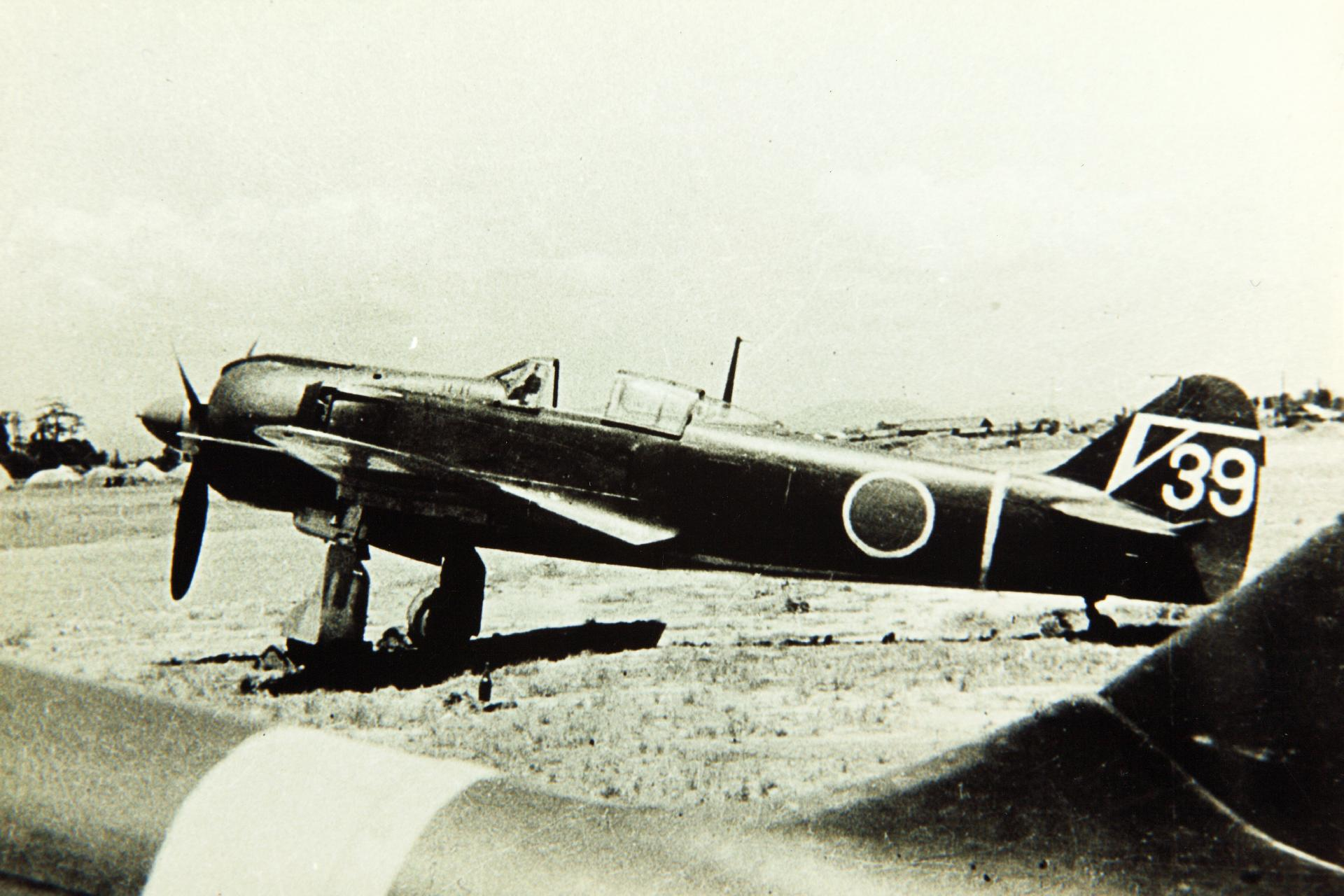
5th Sentai Ki-100-I-Otsu Army Fighter Type 5 Mark 1b, showing cut down rear fuselage

Two remaining problems continued to hamper Japanese fighters towards the end of the war, these being unreliable electrical systems and poor radio equipment, and while the latter was never resolved, the Ki-100's electrical system was less of a problem than with other types.

The armament remained the same as was used on the Ki-61, which was two cowl-mounted 20 mm (0.79 in) calibre Ho-5 cannons, with 200 rounds per gun complemented by two wing-mounted 12.7 mm (0.50 in) Ho-103 machine guns with 250 rounds per gun.

=== Fuselage improvements ===
The Ki-100-I-Otsu were newly built as such, rather than being conversions, with a cut-down rear fuselage and improved canopy, and 118 were produced from May through to the end of July 1945. This version also featured a modified oil cooler under the engine in a more streamlined fairing.

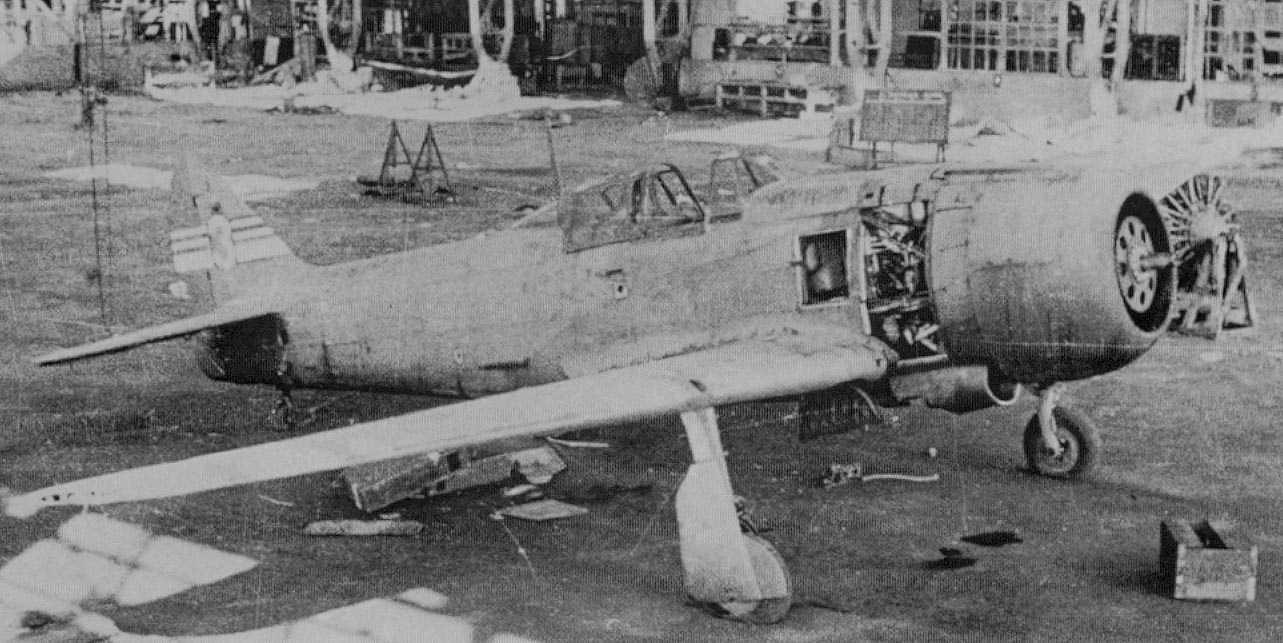
Kawasaki Ki-100-II. Turbocharger on underside is revealed by offset oil cooler, and additional intake on other side

=== High altitude improvements ===
The Ki-100-II was fitted with a turbocharged water-methanol injected engine for improved high-altitude performance, mainly to improve interception capabilities against the Boeing B-29 Superfortresses, but only three prototypes were built; none was used operationally. Due to a lack of space, no intercooler was installed. However, performance was still enhanced above 8,000 m (26,000 ft).

== Operational history ==
The Ki-100 made its combat debut on the night of 9 March 1945 and suffered its first loss a month later on the night of 7 April 1945, when a single Ki-100 of the 18th Sentai was downed by Boeing B-29 Superfortresses after "attacking the formation again and again". Allied aircrews soon realised that they were facing a formidable new fighter. Although far fewer Ki-100s were available than Nakajima Ki-84s, it was an important fighter in the Army's inventory. A well-handled Ki-100 was able to outmanoeuvre any American fighter, including the P-51D Mustangs and Republic P-47N Thunderbolts, which escorted the B-29s over Japan, and was comparable in speed, especially at medium altitudes. The Ki-100 was a tough opponent in the hands of an experienced pilot. The Ki-100, along with the Army's Nakajima Ki-84 and the Navy's Kawanishi N1K-J, were equal to the latest Allied types in the final year of the Pacific War.

Army fighter units equipped with this model included the 5th, 17th, 18th, 20th, 59th, 111th, 112th, 200th, and 244th Sentai and the 81st Independent Fighter Company. Pilots were trained at the Akeno and Hitachi (Mito) Army Flying Schools. Many Akeno and Hitachi instructors were from operational units and, between training sorties, they also flew combat missions, making the most of the few fighters that were operational, but these wings were only partially re-equipped.

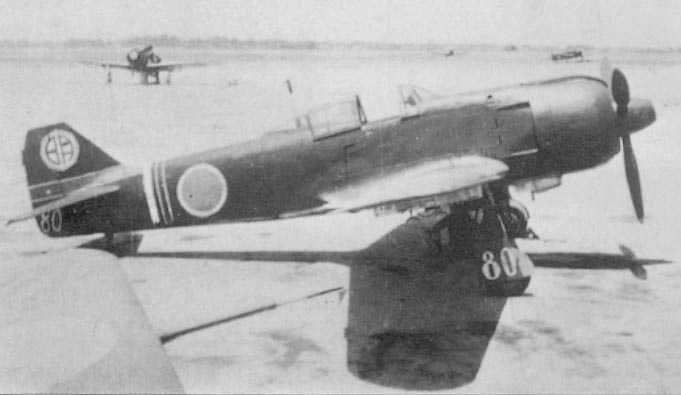
111th Sentai Ki-100-I-Otsu

During interception of high-flying B-29 (before the B-29s switched to low-level missions), the new fighters struggled, as the engine's performance still dropped off at high altitudes. The most effective strategy against the B-29 Superfortress remained the exceedingly dangerous head-on attack, which left the fighter relatively stationary in the sights of the bomber's defensive guns, making it an easy target. In this type of combat, the Navy's Mitsubishi J2M Raiden remained superior.

111th Sentai Ki-100s intercepted B-29 Superfortresses attacking Kobe on 5 June 1945, claiming six bombers shot down and five 'probables'. The Americans recorded a loss of nine B-29s, including those downed by Ki-100s over the target area. Ki-100s of the same unit joined by 244th Sentai Ki-84s in a large-scale engagement against 21st Fighter Group and 506th Fighter Group P-51 Mustangs over Nagoya Bay on 16 July 1945. The Ki-100 pilots claimed six P-51s, and, in return, five Ki-100s were lost with three pilots killed, although American records only show one loss.

On 25 July 1945, 18 244th Sentai Ki-100 fighters clashed with 10 VF-31 Grumman F6F Hellcats from the light aircraft carrier USS Belleau Wood in an air battle where the Ki-100 pilots claimed twelve victories with two losses. Claims and counter-claims for this action remain contentious. The Americans claimed two Ki-100s and admitted to losing two VF-31 F6F-5 Hellcats. These include a Ki-100 and a Hellcat which collided, killing both pilots.

After the bombing of the Kagamigahara plant and the slow deliveries of components by satellite plants, the production rate of the Ki-100 declined, and, between May and July, only twelve were delivered. Bombing ended production - with only 118 of the Army Type 5 Fighter Model 1b having been delivered.

The final flights made by the Imperial Japanese Army Air Service were made by two Ki-100s ferried from Komachi to Yokosuka, where they were handed over to the United States, who then shipped them back to the US for evaluation.

== Variants ==
- Ki-100 (prototypes): Kawasaki Ki-61 II KAI modified with a radial engine. 3 converted from Ki-61s.
- Ki-100-I-Ko: initial production variant, modified from Ki-61 II KAI. 271 converted from Ki-61s.
- Ki-100-I-Otsu: improved canopy and cut down rear fuselage. 118 built.
- Ki-100-II (prototypes): powered with a 1,120 kW (1,500 hp) Mitsubishi Ha-112-II Ru fitted with a turbocharger. 3 built.
- Army Fighter Type 5 Mark Ia: IJA designation for Ki-100-I-Ko
- Army Fighter Type 5 Mark Ib: IJA designation for Ki-100-I-Otsu

=== Production ===
Ki-100 Production aircraft: Kagamigahara, Kawasaki Kokuki K.K.
Year	Jan.	Feb.	Mar.	Apr.	May	June	July	Aug.	Sept.	Oct.	Nov.	Dec.	Total
1945	0	1	36	89	131	88	23	10	0	0	0	0	378

Note:

- Production on the Kagamigahara and Ichinomiya aircraft plant were severely hampered by Allied bombing raids. It was planned to produce 200 airframes per month, but the Ichinomiya plant had to be abandoned after its nearly complete destruction.

Not included:

- Three Ki-100-I prototypes were completed in February 1945.
- Three Ki-100-II prototypes were completed during May to June 1945.
- Twelve additional Ki-100-I-Otsu were built at the Ichinomiya aircraft plant.

Total Production
Per USSBS Report: 378	Figure includes: 272 Ki-100-I and 106 Ki-100-II builds
Per Francillon:396	Figure includes: 275 Ki-100-I and 121 Ki-100-II builds

== Operators ==
Japan

- Imperial Japanese Army Air Service

== Surviving aircraft ==
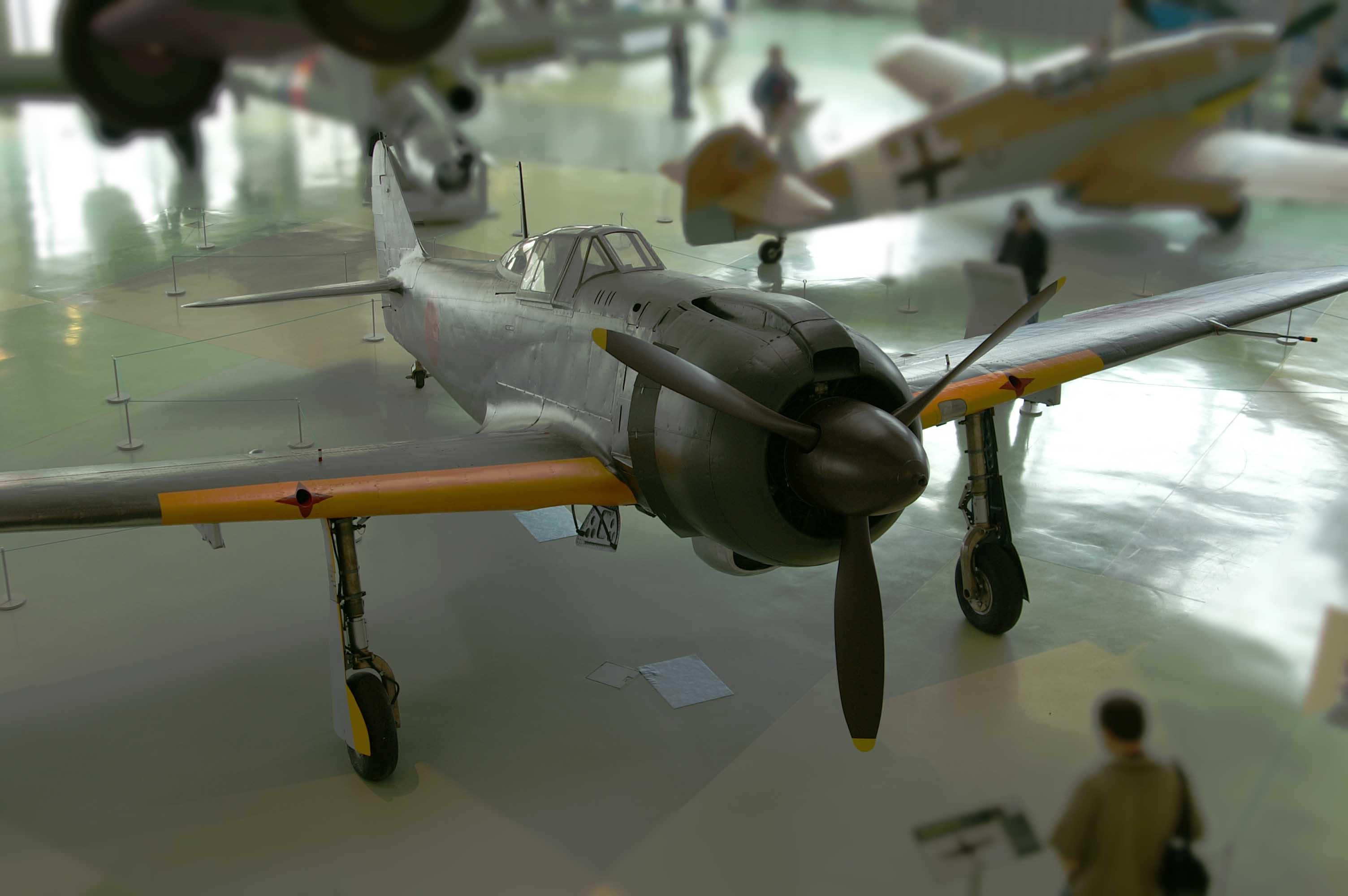
Royal Air Force Museum London Ki-100-1b s/n 8476M from the front

- Kawasaki Ki-100-1b s/n 8476M was captured at Tân Sơn Nhứt Airfield, Saigon, in August 1945 in airworthy condition, having only recently been delivered. However it was damaged there on 26 Nov 1945 during a wheels-up landing, after the undercarriage failed to lower for an attempted landing at Biên Hòa airfield, 15 miles away; it was being ferried there by a Japanese pilot for flight tests. The oil cooler, propeller, and tailwheel were repaired but not returned to complete airworthy condition; it was later shipped to the United Kingdom along with three other Japanese aircraft including a Mitsubishi A6M Zero (Zeke) fuselage, a Mitsubishi Ki-46 (Dinah) and a Nippon Kokusai Ki-86 (Cyprus). After years of being in storage in various locations, and being misidentified as a Nakajima Ki-43 (Oscar), it was restored and placed on display at the Royal Air Force Museum London on the former Hendon Aerodrome in the London Borough of Barnet, UK. It was moved to RAF Museum Cosford on 30 January 2012, though it was again at the RAF Museum London as of December 2024.

== Specifications (Ki-100-I-Ko/Otsu Goshikisen ) ==
Data from Japanese Aircraft of the Pacific War

General characteristics

- Crew: One
- Length: 8.82 m (28 ft 11 in)
- Wingspan: 12.00 m (39 ft 4 in)
- Height: 3.75 m (12 ft 4 in)
- Wing area: 20 m^{2} (220 sq ft)
- Airfoil: NACA 2R1 16 (root), NACA 24009 (tip)
- Empty weight: 2,525 kg (5,567 lb)
- Gross weight: 3,495 kg (7,705 lb)
- Fuel capacity: 595 L (157 US gal; 131 imp gal) (internal fuel)
- Water methanol capacity: 95 L (21 imp gal; 25 US gal)
- Undercarriage track: 4.050 m (13.29 ft)
- Powerplant: 1 × Mitsubishi Ha-112-II/Ha-33 14-cylinder two row air-cooled radial engine, 1,120 kW (1,500 hp) at take off
- Propellers: 3-bladed constant-speed propeller, 3.00 m (9 ft 10 in) diameter

Performance

- Maximum speed: 580 km/h (360 mph, 310 kn) at 6,000 m (20,000 ft)
- Cruise speed: 400 km/h (250 mph, 220 kn) at 4,000 m (13,000 ft)
- Range: 1,400 km (870 mi, 760 nmi) on internal fuel only, 2,200 km (1,400 mi; 1,200 nmi) with 2 x 200 L (44 imp gal; 53 US gal) external droppable fuel tanks
- Endurance: 3 hours 30 minutes
- Service ceiling: 11,000 m (36,000 ft)
- Time to altitude: 6 minutes to 5,000 m (16,000 ft) • 20 minutes to 10,000 m (33,000 ft)
- Wing loading: 174.8 kg/m^{2} (35.8 lb/sq ft)

Armament

- Guns: 2 × 20 mm (0.8 in) fuselage-mounted Ho-5 cannons (400 rpg) and 2 × 12.7 mm (0.50 in) wing-mounted Ho-103 machine guns (500 rpg)
- Hardpoints: 2 × 200 L (44 imp gal; 53 US gal) external drop tanks, carried outboard of the undercarriage legs
- Bombs: 2 × 250 kg (550 lb) bombs, carried in lieu of drop tanks on same hardpoints outboard of the undercarriage

== See also ==
Aircraft of comparable role, configuration, and era

- Fiat G.55 Centauro
- Focke-Wulf Fw 190
- Hawker Tempest
- Lavochkin La-7
- Macchi C.205 Veltro
- Mitsubishi A7M
- Vought F4U Corsair
- Yakovlev Yak-9

Related lists

- List of aircraft of Japan, World War II
- List of aircraft of World War II
