= Takeo Doi (aircraft designer) =

Japanese aircraft designer

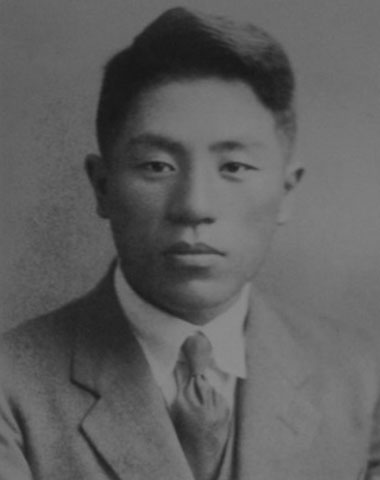

Takeo Doi (土井 武夫, Doi Takeo; 31 October 1904 – 24 December 1996) was a Japanese aircraft designer. He designed many World War II fighter aircraft used by the Imperial Japanese Army Air Force. His most important work was the "Army Type 3 Fighter" (三式戦闘機, Sanshiki sentoki), a.k.a. Kawasaki Ki-61 "Hien" (飛燕, Hi-en) ("flying swallow") or "Tony". Also he was one of the chief designers of the Nihon Aircraft Manufacturing Corporation (NAMC) YS-11.

== Biography ==
Takeo Doi was born in Yamagata city, Yamagata prefecture, Japan in 1904. He graduated from the Yamagata Higher School in 1924, and from the Department of Aeronautics, Faculty of Engineering, Tokyo Imperial University in 1927 . Jiro Horikoshi and Hidemasa Kimura, who designed the Mitsubishi A6M Zero fighter and the Koken (Tokyo Imperial University Aeronautical Research Institute) Long-range Research-plane, respectively, were his classmates at the department in the university.

In 1927 Doi started his career at the Aircraft Department of Kawasaki Dockyard Company Limited (Kobe, Japan), which later became Kawasaki Aircraft Company Limited in 1937. These are the predecessors of present Kawasaki Heavy Industries Aerospace Company reorganized in 1969. At that time, Dr. Richard Vogt was also working for the Kawasaki Dockyard Company Limited. The company invited Vogt from Germany as a technical advisor to teach its engineers in the construction techniques of Dornier aircraft which Kawasaki was building under license. As a chief designer, Vogt trained Doi to be his successor. They worked jointly on several aircraft projects, including the (KDA-5 Army Type 92 biplane fighter, KDA-2 Army Type 88 reconnaissance biplane, KDA-3 single-seat fighter, and KDA-5 Army Type 92-I biplane fighter).

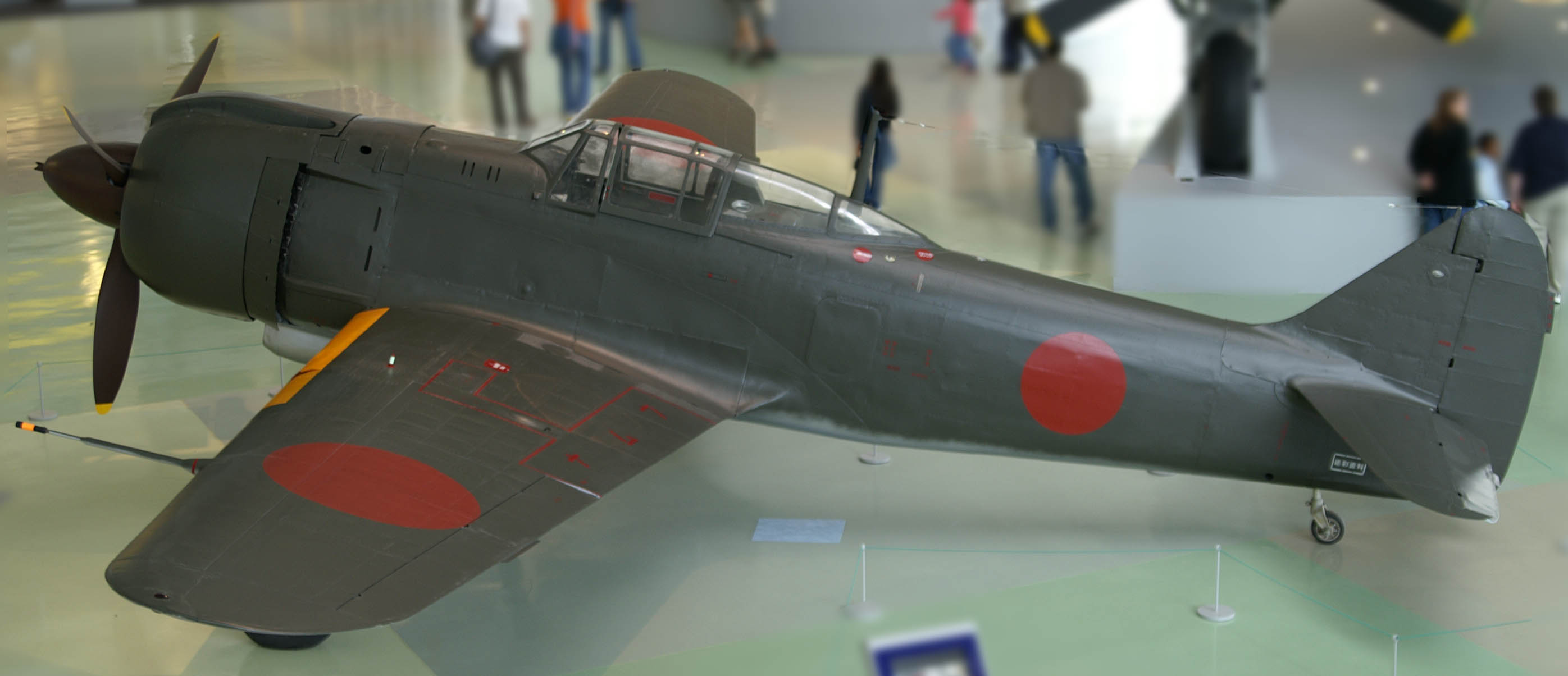
A Kawasaki Ki-100 on display in the RAF Museum at Hendon

During this period, Doi was dispatched to Europe, where he worked for one and a half years. In Europe he studied aircraft engineering. While Doi was in the United Kingdom he paid attention to the technology of George Dowty, founder of Dowty Aviation. As Dowty's technology in aviation hydraulic systems was state-of-the-art and met the requirement of the Japanese military, Doi chose Dowty equipment for the landing gear of the Army Type 92-I Fighter. This decision helped Dowty to develop his company, Dowty Aviation, and became a milestone for the expansion of the Dowty Equipment group thereafter. By strange coincidence, Dowty Rotol, descendant of the company, supplied the propellers used on the NAMC YS-11 airliner.

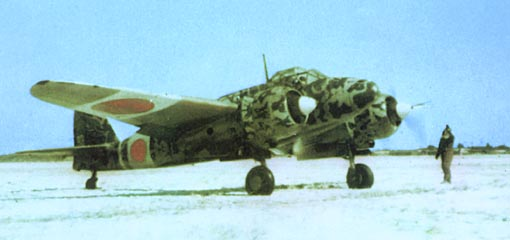
Kawasaki Ki-45 "Toryu". Doi designed not only the single-engine aircraft but also multi-engine ones.

After Vogt returned to Germany, Doi became the key person in the design bureau of Kawasaki Aircraft until the company ceased operations at the end of World War II. His most important and outstanding work was the design of Army Type 3 Fighter Kawasaki Ki-61 "Hien". Ki-61 Hien demonstrated surprising performance that surpassed the famous Mitsubishi A6M Zero. A total of 3,159 Ki-61 Hien and its variants were built.

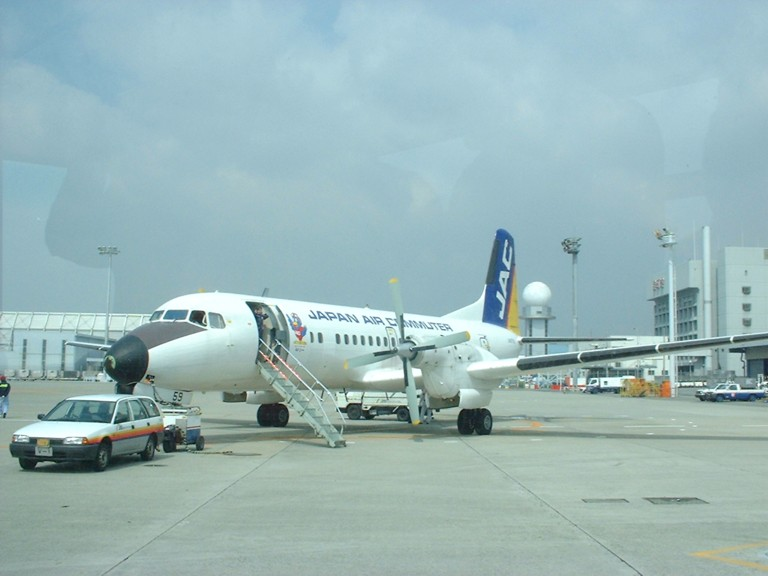
NAMC YS-11 operated by Japan Air Commuter (JAC). YS-11 is the only successful commercial aircraft made by Japanese manufacture. Doi joined the project as a chief designer in charge of aeronautical equipment.

After WWII, Doi was forced to interrupt work on aircraft design until the Treaty of San Francisco came into force in 1952. During this period, he worked as a day laborer, while continuing to have faith that he would eventually return to aviation field. He continued to study the latest technology with Kimura who was the professor fired from the University of Tokyo. Kimura was Doi's best friend. When the treaty lifted the ban on designing and operating aircraft, Doi returned to his original work. In 1956 the Ministry of International Trade and Industry of Japan announced a domestic production plan of middle-sized commercial aircraft, i.e. the YS-11. The consortium of companies, the Nihon Aircraft Manufacturing Corporation (NAMC), was established. NAMC included Mitsubishi Heavy Industries, and Fuji Heavy Industries, Shinmeiwa Manufacturing, Japan Aircraft, Showa Aircraft, and Kawasaki Heavy Industries (Kawasaki Aircraft). Doi was nominated the chief designer of equipment team.

Doi became a professor at Meijo University after he retired Kawasaki Heavy Industries. He also served as a councilor of the Japan Society for Aeronautical Science, a trustee of Japan Aeronautic Association, and an advisor emeritus of Kawasaki Heavy Industries.

Details of his philosophy on aircraft design were written in his memoirs, regarding the designing policy, developmental history of the aviation technology, and his friends, published in Japan in 1989.

== Aircraft of his design ==
- Kawasaki Ki-10 (Army Type 95 Fighter)
- Kawasaki Ki-45 "Toryu" (Army Type 2 Two-seat Fighter)
- Kawasaki Ki-48 (Army Type 99 Bomber)
- Kawasaki Ki-56 (Army Type 1 Transport Aircraft)
- Kawasaki Ki-61 "Hien" (Army Type 3 Fighter)
- Kawasaki Ki-100 (Army Type 5 Fighter)
- NAMC YS-11
- Kawasaki P-2J (customized Lockheed P-2 Neptune, anti-submarine warfare aircraft)

== Writings ==
- 航空機設計50年の回想 ("Fifty Years Recollections on Aircraft Design") by Takeo Doi (Kantosha, October 1989), ISBN 978-4-87357-014-3
- 軍用機開発物語 ("Story of Warplane Development") by Takeo Doi (Kojinsha, August 2007), ISBN 978-4-7698-2334-6
