= Rate of fire =

Firearm actions

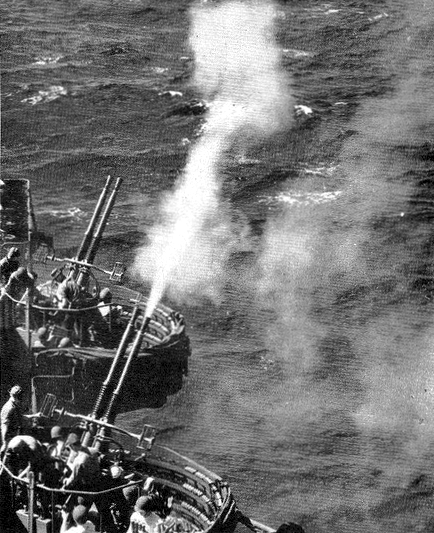
40 millimetre Bofors Mark 1 twin mounts firing during a gunnery drill aboard the U.S. Navy escort carrier USS Attu 1944.

Rate of fire is the frequency at which a specific weapon can fire or launch its projectiles. This can be influenced by several factors, including operator training level, mechanical limitations, ammunition availability, and weapon condition. In modern weaponry, it is usually measured in rounds per minute (RPM or round/min) or rounds per second (RPS or round/s).

There are three different measurements for the rate of fire: cyclic, sustained, and rapid. Cyclic is the maximum given rate of fire given only mechanical function, not taking into account degradation of function due to heat, wear, or ammunition constraints. Sustained is the maximum efficient rate of fire given the time taken to load the weapon and keep it cool enough to operate. Finally, rapid is the maximum reasonable rate of fire in an emergency when the rate of fire need not be upheld for long periods.

== Overview ==
For manually operated weapons such as bolt-action rifles or artillery pieces, the rate of fire is governed primarily by the training of the operator or crew, within some mechanical limitations. Rate of fire may also be affected by ergonomic factors. For rifles, ease-of-use features such as the design of the bolt or magazine release can affect the rate of fire.

For artillery pieces, a gun on a towed mount can usually achieve a higher rate of fire than the same weapon mounted within the cramped confines of a tank or self-propelled gun. This is because the crew operating in the open can move more freely and can stack ammunition where it is most convenient. Inside a vehicle, ammunition storage may not be optimized for fast handling due to other design constraints, and crew movement may be constricted. Artillery rates of fire were increased in the late 19th century by innovations including breech-loading and quick-firing guns.

For automatic weapons such as machine guns, the rate of fire is primarily a mechanical property. A high cyclic firing rate is advantageous for use against targets that are exposed to a machine gun for a limited time span, like aircraft or targets that minimize their exposure time by quickly moving from cover to cover. For targets that can be fired on by a machine gun for longer periods than just a few seconds the cyclic firing rate becomes less important.

For a third hybrid class of weapons, common in handguns and rifles, known as a semi-automatic firearm, the rate of fire is primarily governed by the ability of the operator to actively pull the trigger and, for aimed fire, the operator's shot-to-shot recovery time. No other factors significantly contribute to the rate of fire. Generally, a semi-automatic firearm automatically chambers a round using blowback energy, but does not fire the new round until the trigger is released to a reset point and actively pulled again. A semi-automatic's rate of fire is significantly different from and should not be confused with a full-automatic's rate of fire. Many full-automatic small arms have a selective fire feature that 'downgrades' them to semi-automatic mode by changing a switch.

Over time, weapons have attained higher rates of fire. A small infantry unit armed with modern rifles and machine guns can generate more firepower than much larger units equipped with older weapons. Over the 20th century, this increased firepower was due almost entirely to the higher rate of fire of modern weapons.

An example of increase in rate of fire is the Maxim machine gun that was developed in 1884. Its performance was improved from its original performance mainly by advances in the field of cooling.

== Measurement ==
There are diverse measurements of rate of fire. The speed of the fire will vary depending on the type of automatic weapon.

=== Cyclic rate ===
This measures how quickly an automatic or semi-automatic firearm can fire a single cartridge. At the end of a cycle, the weapon should be ready to fire or begin firing another round. In an open bolt simple blowback weapon, this starts with pulling the trigger to release the bolt. The bolt pushes a cartridge into the barrel from a magazine and fires it. The energy propelling the bullet also pushes the bolt rearward against the recoil spring. After the bolt is stopped by either the spring or the rear of the receiver, it is pushed forward to either fire again or catch on the sear. Typical cyclic rates of fire are 600–1100 rpm for assault rifles, 400–1400 rpm for submachine guns and machine pistols, and 600–1,500 rpm for machine guns. M134 Miniguns mounted on attack helicopters and other combat vehicles can achieve rates of fire of over 100 rounds per second (6,000 rpm).

=== Effective rate ===
This is the duration of firing that a weapon could be expected to realistically withstand or output in a realistic environment. On paper, the M134 is capable of firing up to 6,000 rpm. Realistically, firing the weapon for a continuous sixty seconds would likely melt parts of the weapon. Sustained rate-of-fire depends on several factors, including reloading, aiming, barrel changes, cartridge fired, and user expertise. Knowing the effective rate of fire for a weapon can be useful for determining ammunition reserve and resupply requirements. Machine guns are typically fired in short bursts to preserve ammunition and barrel life, reserving long strings of fire for emergencies. Sustained rate-of-fire also applies to box magazine fed assault rifles and semi-automatic rifles, although these weapons rarely expend ammunition at the same rate as light machine guns.

=== Sustained or rapid rate ===
Rapid or sustained rate of fire may be considered a weapon's absolute maximum firing rate. The term sustained refers to firing a fully-automatic weapon continuously, while rapid is limited to semi-automatic or manually operated firearms. Rapid and sustained fire are usually reserved for close-range defense against ambushes or human wave attacks. Such scenarios trade control, ammunition, and even aiming for sheer volume of fire. These fire rates push weapons and soldiers to their physical limits and cannot be sustained for long periods.

== Technical limitations ==
The major limitation in higher rates of fire arises due to the problem of heat. Even a manually operated rifle generates heat as rounds are fired. A machine gun builds up heat so rapidly that steps must be taken to prevent overheating. Solutions include making barrels heavier so that they heat up more slowly, making barrels rapidly replaceable by the crews, or using water jackets around the barrel to cool the weapon. A modern machine gun team will carry at least one spare barrel for their weapon, which can be swapped out within a few seconds by a trained crew. Problems with overheating can range from ammunition firing unintentionally (cook-off), or, what is much worse in combat, failure to fire, or even explosion of the weapon.

Water-cooled weapons can achieve very high effective rates of fire (approaching their cyclic rate) but are very heavy and vulnerable to damage. A well-known example is the M1917 Browning machine gun, a heavy machine gun designed by John Browning and used by US forces during WWI. It became the basis of the much more common Browning M1919 machine gun, used by US forces throughout World War II, as well as the Browning M2 .50 caliber heavy machine gun, which is still in service, as well as many adaptions, such as the Japanese Ho-103 aircraft machine gun during World War II. Another legendarily reliable heavy machine gun is the British Vickers machine gun, based on the Maxim machine gun design, which saw service both on the air and ground during World War I and World War II. Due to their disadvantages, water-cooled weapons have gradually been replaced by much lighter air-cooled weapons. For weapons mounted on aircraft, no cooling device is necessary due to the outside air cooling the weapon as the aircraft is moving. Consequently, aircraft-mounted machine guns, autocannon or Gatling-type guns can sustain fire far longer than ground-based counterparts, firing close to their cyclic rate of fire. However, due to the weight of the ammunition, sustained fire is constrained by ammunition payload, as many aircraft cannons only carry enough ammunition for a few seconds' worth of firing; for example, the F-16 Falcon and its variants carry 511 rounds of 20mm ammunition, and the F-22 Raptor carries a similar amount at 480 rounds, which equates to roughly five seconds of firing at the M61 Vulcan's 6000 rpm (100 rounds per second) cyclic rate. (Some aircraft, due to the purpose of the design, do carry more, such as the GAU-8 Avenger mounted on the A-10 Thunderbolt, which carries 1,150 rounds of ammunition sufficient for 17 seconds of firing).

Another factor influencing rate of fire is the supply of ammunition. At 50 rps (3,000 rpm), a five-second burst from an M134 Minigun would use approximately 6.3 kilograms (14 lb) of 7.62 mm ammunition; this alone would make it an impractical weapon for infantry who have to carry a reasonable supply of ammunition with them. For this and other reasons, weapons with such high rates of fire are typically only found on vehicles or fixed emplacements.

== See also ==
- Multiple-barrel firearm
