= Akeno Air Field =

Akeno Air Field 明野飛行場
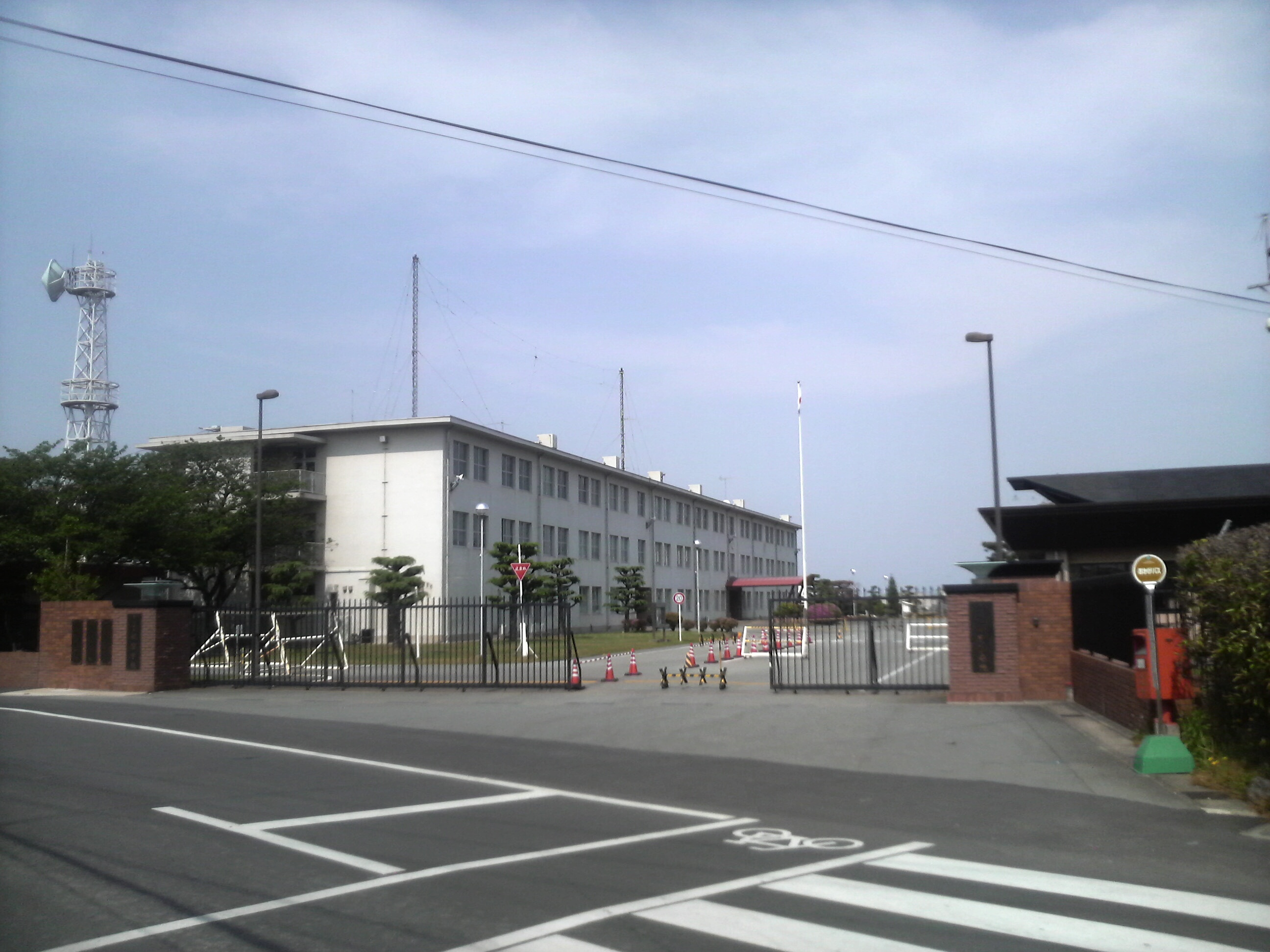
- IATA: none; ICAO: RJOE

Summary
- Airport type: Military
- Operator: Japan Ground Self-Defense Force
- Location: Ise, Japan
- Elevation AMSL: 20 ft (6.1 m)
- Coordinates: 34°32′00″N 136°40′20″E

Map
- Location in Japan

Runways
Direction	Length		Surface
Direction	m	ft	Surface
13/31	500	1,640	Concrete
04/22	500	1,640	Concrete
- Source: Japanese AIP at AIS Japan

Akeno Air Field (ICAO: RJOE) is a military aerodrome of the Japan Ground Self-Defense Force. It is located 3.2 NM (5.9 km; 3.7 mi) northwest of Ise in the Mie Prefecture, Japan.

JGSDF helicopter types based at Akeno include Bell AH-1S Cobra, Bell UH-1J Iroquois, Kawasaki OH-1, Kawasaki OH-6D, Kawasaki CH-47J/JA Chinook, Mitsubishi UH-60J and Emstron TH-480.
