= Ho-103 machine gun =

Imperial Japanese aircraft heavy machine gun

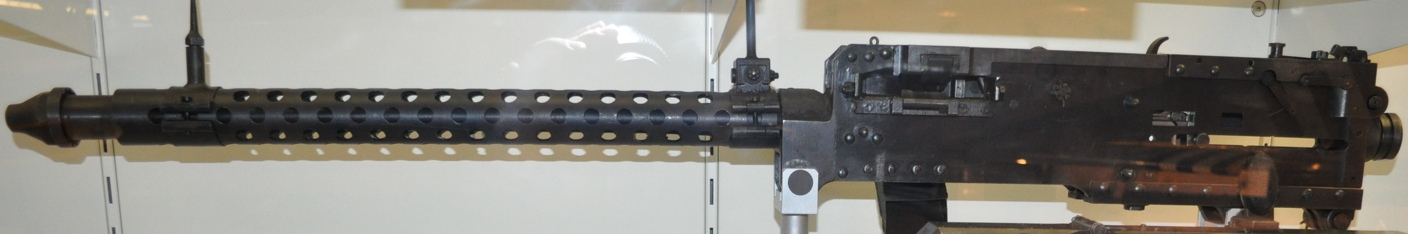
- 12.7 mm Ho-103 machine gun on display at the Steven F. Udvar-Hazy Center
- Type: Machine gun
- Place of origin: Empire of Japan

Service history
- Used by: Imperial Japanese Army
- Wars: World War II

Production history
- Produced: 1941-1945

Specifications
- Mass: 23 kilograms (50.7 lb)
- Length: 1,267 mm (49.9 in)
- Barrel length: 800 mm (31 in)
- Cartridge: 12.7x81mmSR Breda
- Action: Recoil operation
- Rate of fire: 983 RPM; 400 RPM (synchronized)
- Muzzle velocity: 780 m/s (2,600 ft/s)
- Feed system: Belt 320 rounds
- Sights: Iron

The Type 1 machine gun (signifying its year of adoption, 1941) was a Japanese aircraft-mounted heavy machine gun widely used during World War II. It was also known as the Ho-103 in general use. The weapon itself was largely based on the American .50-caliber (12.7 mm) M2 Browning heavy machine gun, while the design of its ammunition was initially based on various Italian Breda-SAFAT 12.7 mm rounds. Japanese-designed and produced rounds eventually largely replaced these imported rounds.

The Ho-103 achieved a slightly higher rate of fire (RoF) than the contemporary aircraft-mounted M2 Browning machine gun (AN/M2) by using the smaller, lower velocity semi-rimmed Breda-SAFAT 12.7 mm cartridge. The round was intermediate in length (88 mm) between the WWII German 13 mm calibre MG 131's ‘short’ 64 mm cartridge, and the ‘long’ 99 mm cartridge of the M2 Browning. A high RoF was very desirable among aircraft weaponry; with the ever-increasing speeds of fighters, the window to score hits grew smaller and smaller. Thus, a higher RoF provided a greater density of fire and therefore a greater chance to hit. The compromise of a shorter cartridge to achieve this had drawbacks: Ho-103 rounds had a shorter maximum and effective range, as well as a lower velocity than their M2 Browning counterparts. To compensate for the mild to moderate loss in performance, the gun was frequently loaded with high-explosive incendiary (HEI) rounds. The Italian Breda-SAFAT HEI ammunition was initially copied as the fuzed Ma 103 round, until the fuzeless Ma 102 round was developed, carrying over double the high explosive content of the Ma 103.

== Ammunition ==
The Ho-103 used a wide variety of ammunition; Most was produced in Japan, but some was imported from Italy (such ammunition was identical to that used in Breda-SAFAT HMGs). Types of ammunition used by the Ho-103 include:

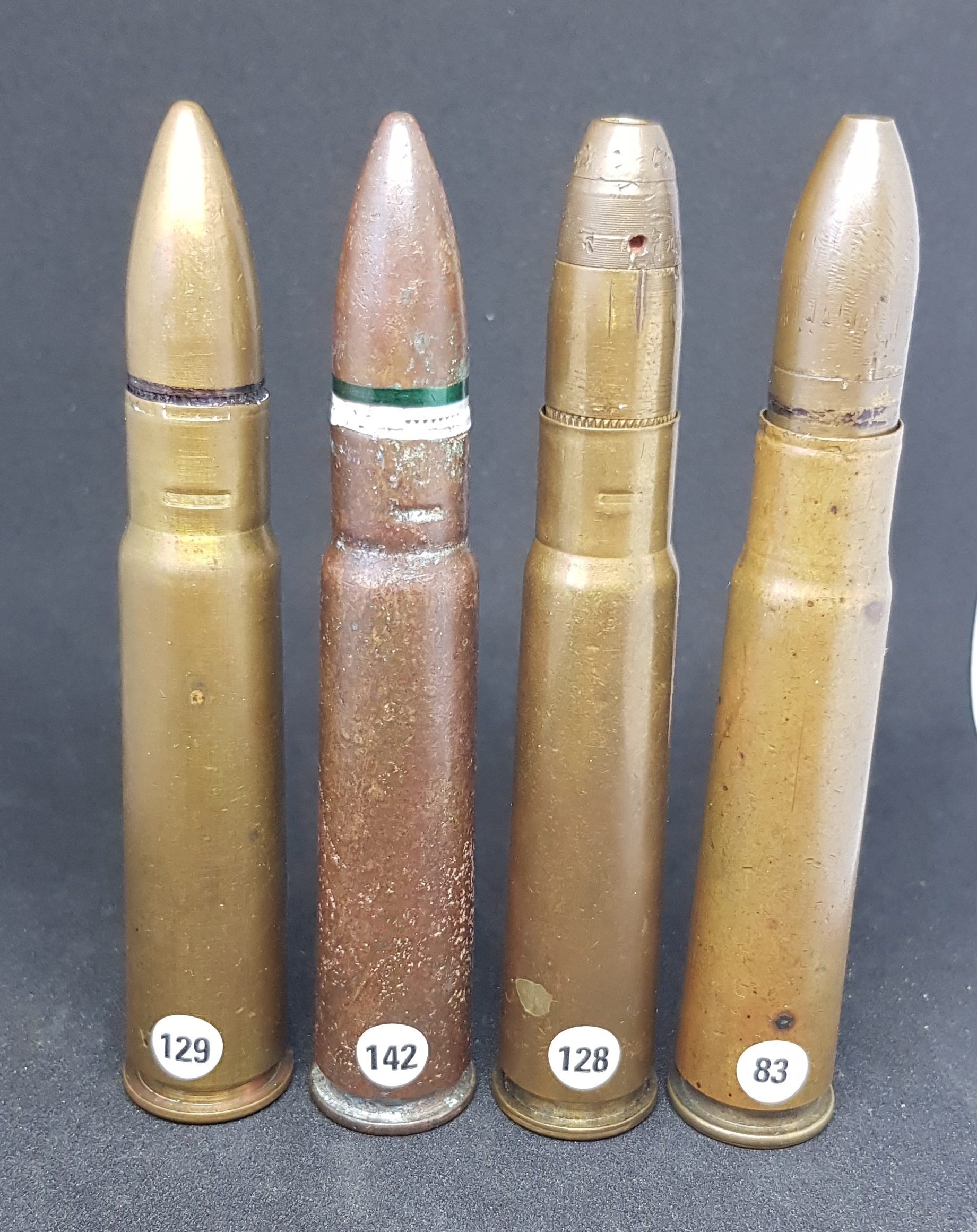
Some examples of Ho-103 cartridges. From left to right: AP-T (red tracer), AP-T (white tracer), Ma 103 HEI (two-piece fuze, traces of white seal are still present in the knurles on the projectile), Ma 102 HEI.

- Ball (full metal jacket), marked with a pink or red seal around the casemouth.
- Armor piercing (AP) of Italian origin, marked with a black tip.
- Armour piercing tracer (AP-T) with red tracer, marked with a pink tip and green and white seal around the casemouth.
- AP-T with brighter-burning, longer-lasting red tracer, uncolored tip and black seal around the casemouth.
- AP-T with white tracer, uncolored tip and green and white seal around the casemouth.
- Fuzed high-explosive incendiary (HEI) of Italian origin, its body painted blue or red. Contained 0.8 grams (12 gr) of PETN and incendiary composition.
- Ma 103 fuzed HEI, marked with a white seal around the casemouth. Contained 0.8 grams (12 gr) of RDX and 1.46 grams (22.5 gr) incendiary composition. Copy of the Italian fuzed HEI round with additional incendiary composition added.
- Ma 102 fuzeless HEI, marked with a dark purple seal around the casemouth. Contained 2 grams (31 gr) of PETN + RDX and 1.46 grams (22.5 gr) incendiary composition. Elimination of the fuze from the Ma 103 HEI round permitted additional space for explosive content. Considered an improvement over the Ma 103, detonation was achieved via crumpling of the round upon striking a target.

== Design ==
The 12.7×81mm cartridge allowed the Type 1 to fire at a rate of 900 RPM, but the poor suitability of the Browning's action to synchronization reduced the rate of fire to 400 RPM in synchronized installations. However, the Japanese source and Allied Intelligence reports did not mention that this machine gun had a propeller synchronization flaw.

== Bibliography ==
- Rottman, Gordon L. (2010). Browning .50-caliber Machine Guns. Oxford, UK: Osprey Publishing. ISBN 978-1849083300.
