= Dornier Komet =

1921 airliner family by Dornier

Komet, Merkur, and related
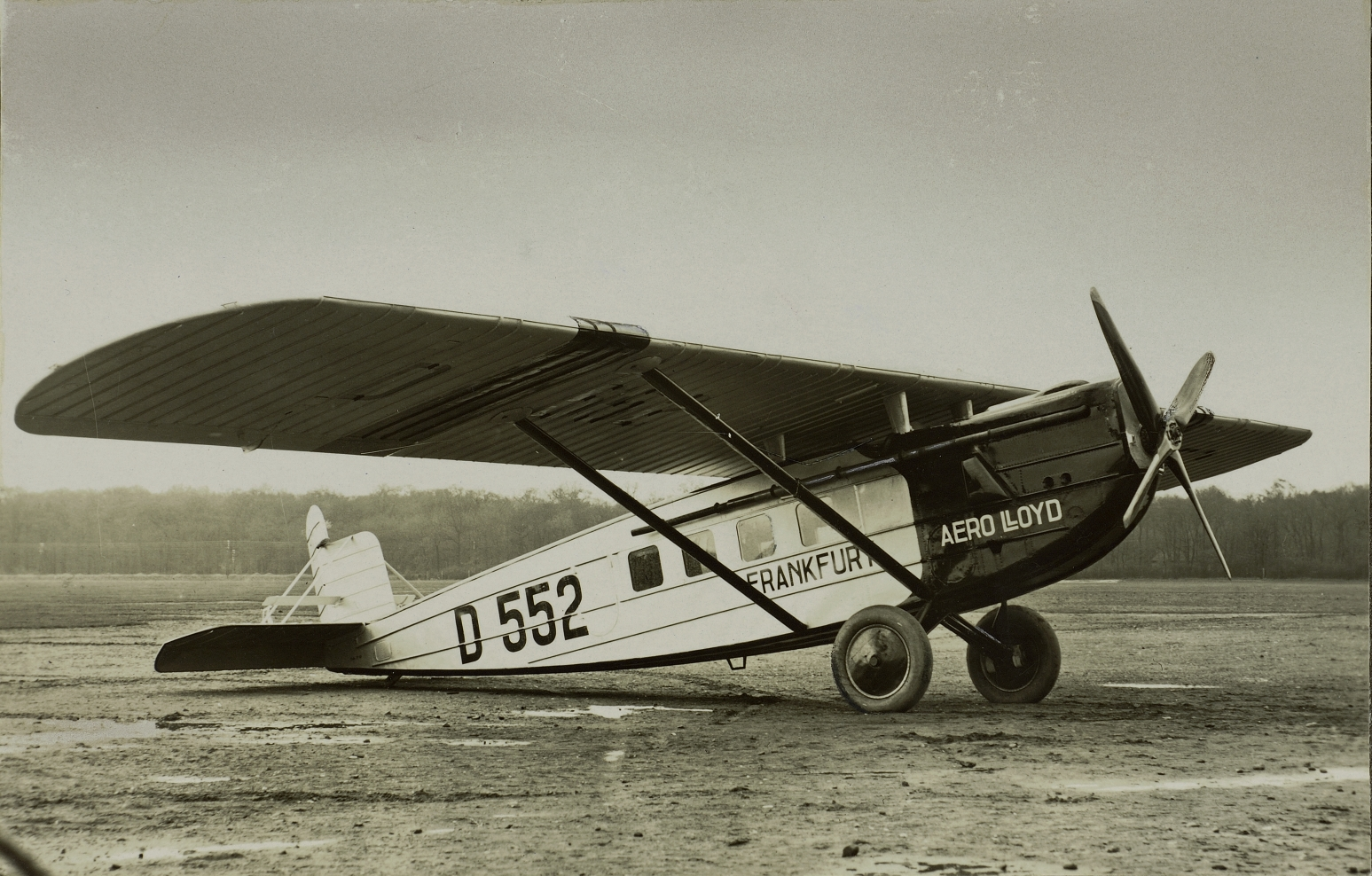
- Komet III

General information
- Type: Airliner
- Manufacturer: Dornier Flugzeugwerke

History
- First flight: 1921
- Developed from: Dornier Delphin
- Variant: Dornier Do 10

The Dornier Komet (Comet), Merkur (Mercury), Do C, Do D, and Do T were a family of aircraft designed and manufactured by the German aircraft manufacturer Dornier Flugzeugwerke.

Developed during the 1920s, the aircraft was originally operated as a small airliner. Military variants were subsequently developed, including a heavily modified floatplane torpedo bomber model. The earliest aircraft in the series were basically landplane versions of the Delphin flying boat, and although the Delphin and Komet/Merkur series diverged from each other, design changes and refinements from one family were often incorporated into the other. All variants were braced high-winged single-engine monoplanes with conventional landing gear.

== Development ==
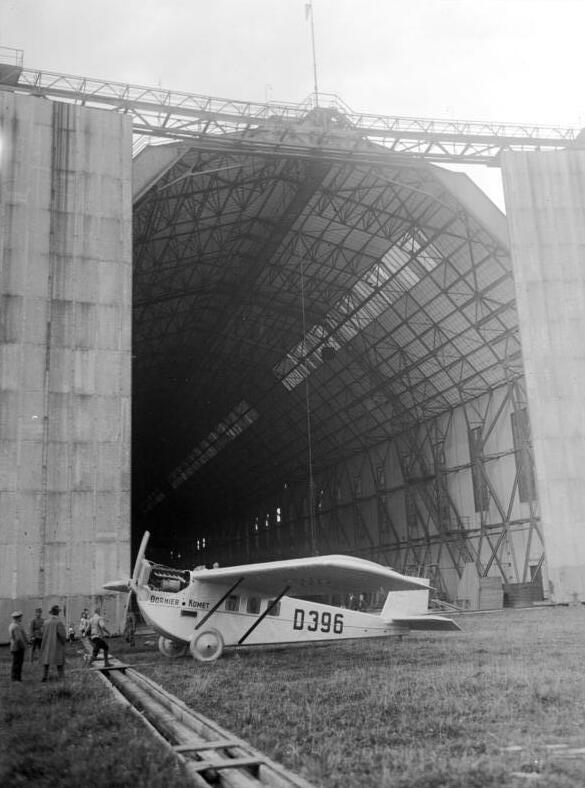
Dornier Komet

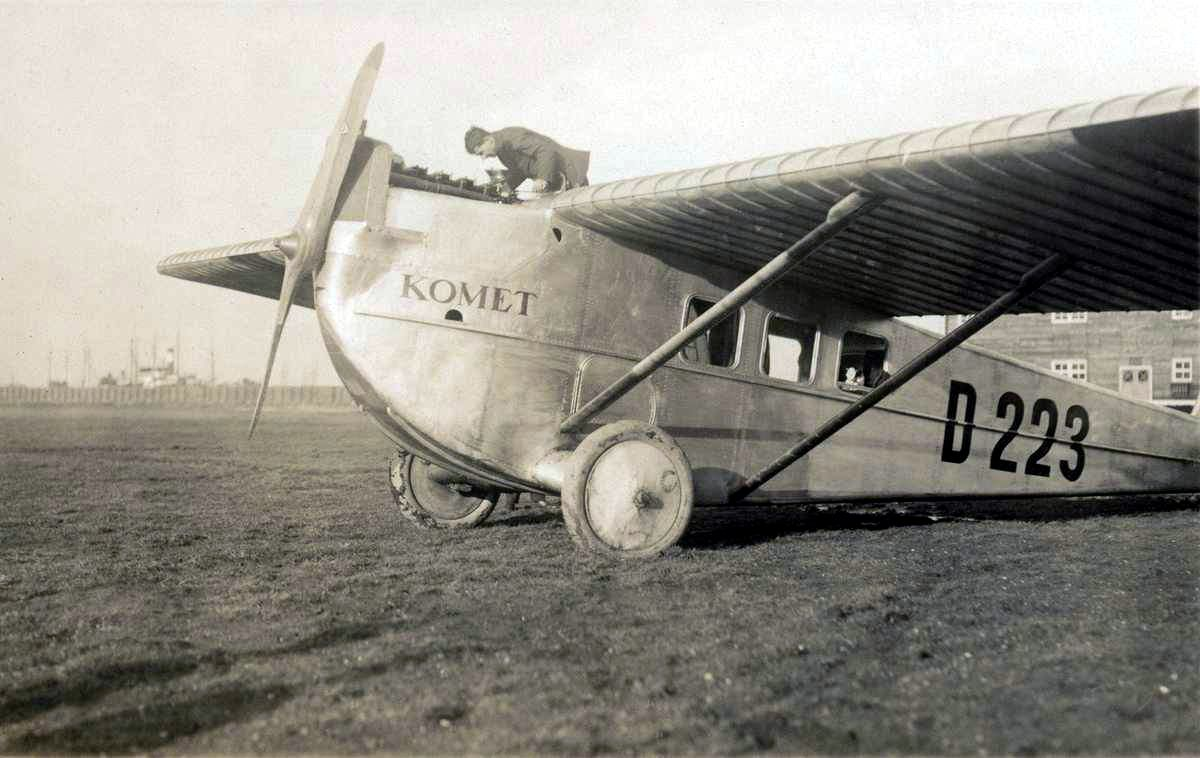
Dornier Komet II (2), 1922

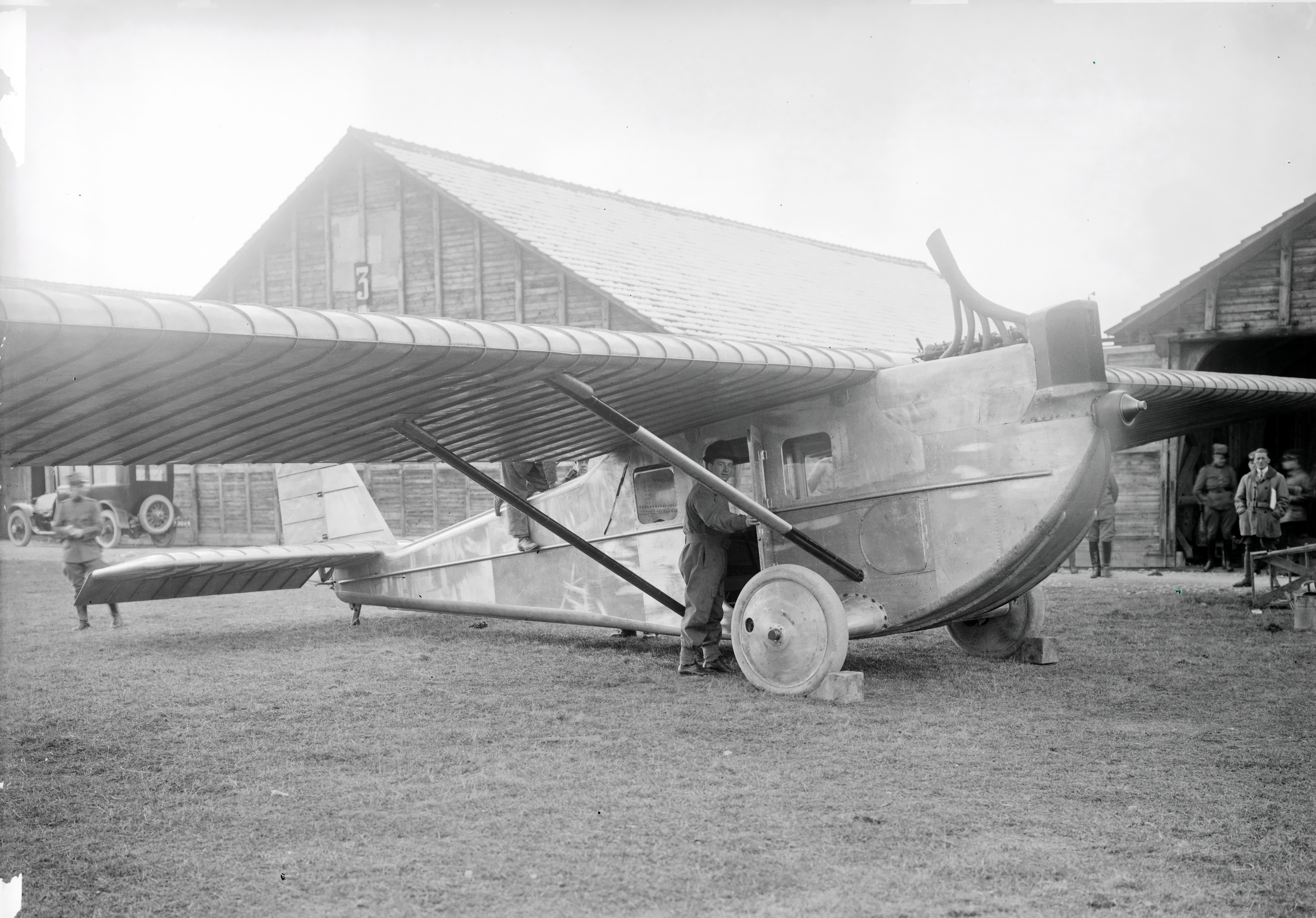
A version of the Dornier Komet at Dübendorf airfield

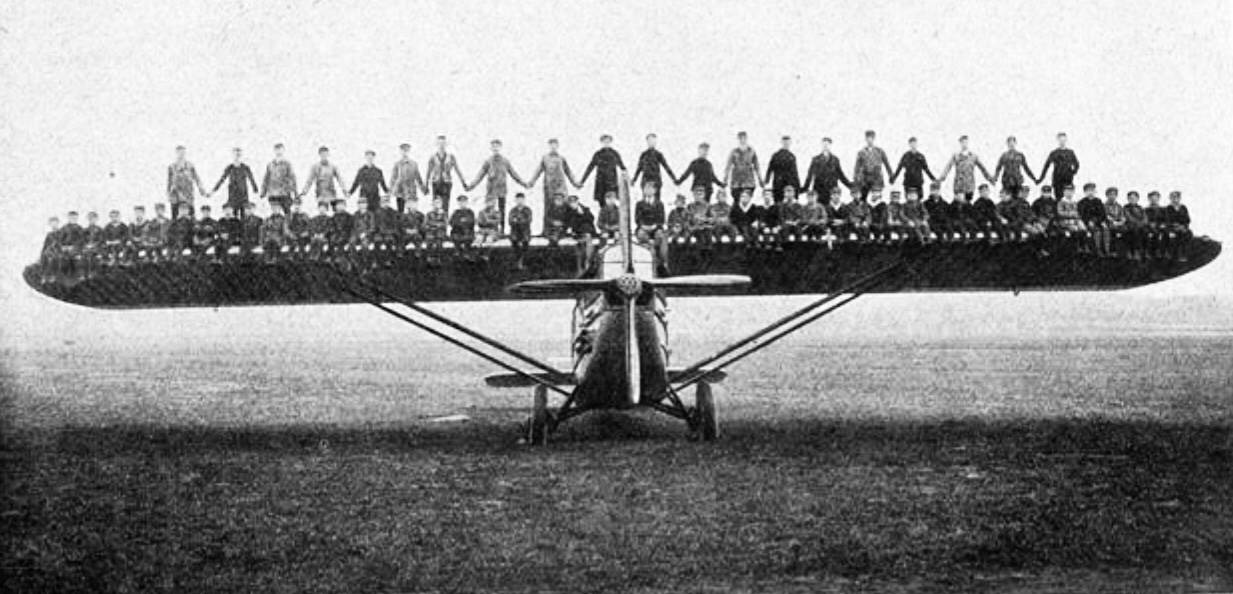
Dornier Komet III Stability test

The first Komets (Do C III Komet I) utilised the same rectangular plan, 17 m (55 ft 9 in) span wing, tail, and even upper fuselage, as well as the 138 kW (185 hp) BMW IIIa engine of the Delphin I, but replaced the lower fuselage and sponsons with a simple sheet-metal bottom that incorporated fixed tailskid undercarriage. The engine installation was also relocated from above the Delphin's nose to a conventional location in the Komet's fuselage nose. Accommodation was provided for a single pilot and four passengers. An improved version, the Do Komet II, was first flown on 9 October 1922 and was widely exported to countries including Colombia, Spain, Switzerland, and the Soviet Union.

The Do Komet III of 1924 was a practically all-new design that shared many elements with the Delphin III. The cabin was expanded to seat another two passengers and the larger wing, with a span of 19.6 m (64 ft 4 in), was raised above the fuselage on short struts. Power was greatly increased from the Komet I, with a 340 kW (450 hp) Napier Lion engine. This version was exported to Denmark and Sweden, but was also produced under licence in Japan by Kawasaki.

In 1925, the Komet III was replaced in production by the Do B Merkur I, which featured a revised fin and longer-span wings. When fitted with the BMW VI engine, it became known as the Do B Bal Merkur II, as did indeed any Komets thus re-engined. The type was widely used by Deutsche Luft Hansa, which had some 30 Merkurs operating at one time, and was also exported to Brazil, China, Colombia, Japan, and Switzerland.

The Do C and Do D were follow-on military designs, the former was a trainer exported to Chile and Colombia while the latter was a floatplane torpedo bomber built for the Yugoslav Royal Navy. The designation Do T was used for a landplane ambulance version.

== Design ==
The Dornier Komet family of aircraft were high-wing monoplane all-metal aircraft. The aircraft had a atypically low centre of gravity, which was partially attributable to the design of its undercarriage and made it unlikely for the aircraft to overturn even during challenging landings. Power was provided by a single nose-mounted engine. The aircraft was promoted for its ability to be used as an airliner, utility transport, air ambulance, aerial surveyor, in either a landplane or floatplane configuration.

The majority of the airframe was composed of duralumin except for highly-stressed components, which were made of steel instead. As an anti-corrosion measure, all steel parts were alloyed while the duralumin components, although a particularly corrosion-resistant light alloy, had a layer of protective paint applied. Almost all sections of the airframe were manufactured from strips of plate that were drawn in dies. This production technique resulted in particularly durable struts while plate sections were well-braced via their securing to flanged channel sections that were aligned to the direction of the external streamlines and at right angles to the interior, subdividing the shall into small rectangular sections. There was no use of either tubes or corrugated plate; flat plate was opted for as it readily absorbed stress in all directions. Parts were joined together using riveting in a manner that permitted repairs and even total replacement to be readily performed by non-specialist workers. Accessibility to all parts was also facilitated in the aircraft's design.

The wings of the aircraft were divided into sections, the two end sections were detachable, being only secured to the centre section of the wing; this centre section was in turn secured to the fuselage and braced at roughly their halfway along their length by a pair of struts that attached to the base of the fuselage. These struts enabled the wings to have a constant chord along with an invariable section of moderate thickness to suit the most favourable aerodynamic characteristics. A pair of spars (composed of steel sections) and relatively sturdy box ribs, the latter eliminating the need for bracing of the former, absorbed the various forces exerted upon the wings. Strips of plate, both smooth and ribbed, were placed on key areas, such as the ribs, to increase their strength; these strips were usually flanged upwards and connected via rivets after small channel sections were placed over them. The gussets of the spars were relieved by sectioned bracings that extended in parallel to the spars.

The fuselage of the aircraft was divided into several compartments. The forwardmost of these was the engine bay, within the nose; beneath the engine, which was supported on a pair of bearers, an oil-tight luggage compartment was present that could be used to trim the aircraft. Aft of the engine bay was the cockpit, which seated a pair of pilots provisioned with dual flight controls and comprehensive instrumentation for the era. The main cabin lay directly behind, passengers would be seated on light wicker chairs that were aligned to the windows; the rear area of the cabin typically featured a toilet. The flight control surfaces were arranged on the end of the fuselage; both the fins and rudder had a plate covering while other surfaces used fabric for lower inertia. Both the elevator and ailerons were balanced while the horizontal stabiliser was adjustable.

The engine, which was housed within the nose of the aircraft, directly drove the propeller. A variety of engines could be installed, the BMW VI V-12 engine being a popular choice. When powered by the BMW engine, the aircraft was capable of greater performance, particularly in terms of its altitude ceiling, than it would have when using several other powerplants. The primary radiator was located beneath the engine inside the airflow from the propeller; additional radiators at locations such as the winds, sides, and back could be fitted if specified. Fuel was housed in two main tanks adjacent to the central section of the wing as well as two auxiliary tanks below the pilot's seat; the upper tanks supplied fuel to the engines via gravity while a hand-pump was necessary for the auxiliary tanks. The oil tanks were located at the rear of the engine just below the upper surface of the fuselage.

== Operational history ==
During late June 1926, an unmodified Dornier Merkur set multiple world records during a series of flights performed at Dübendorf; at one point, the type held a quarter of all world records for the landplane category.

A replica Dornier Merkur was made for the Dorner Museum in the early 2000s.

== Variants ==
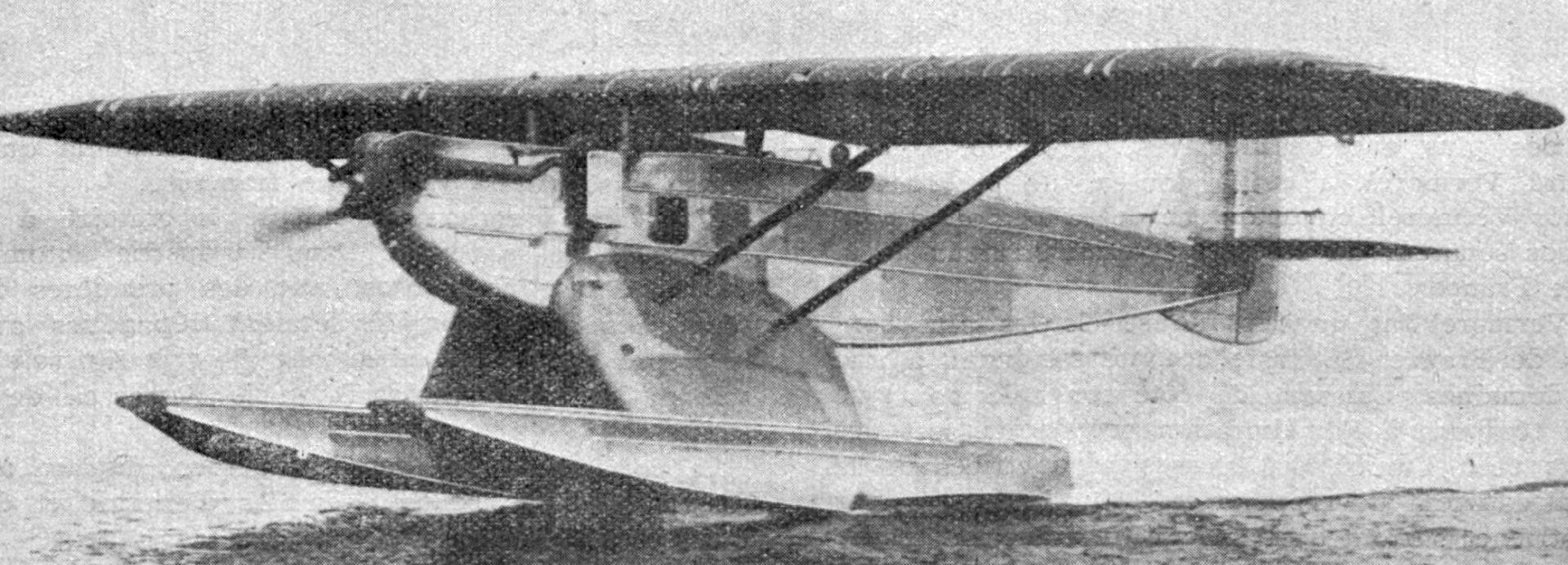
Dornier Do D seaplane version, from L'Aérophile December,1927

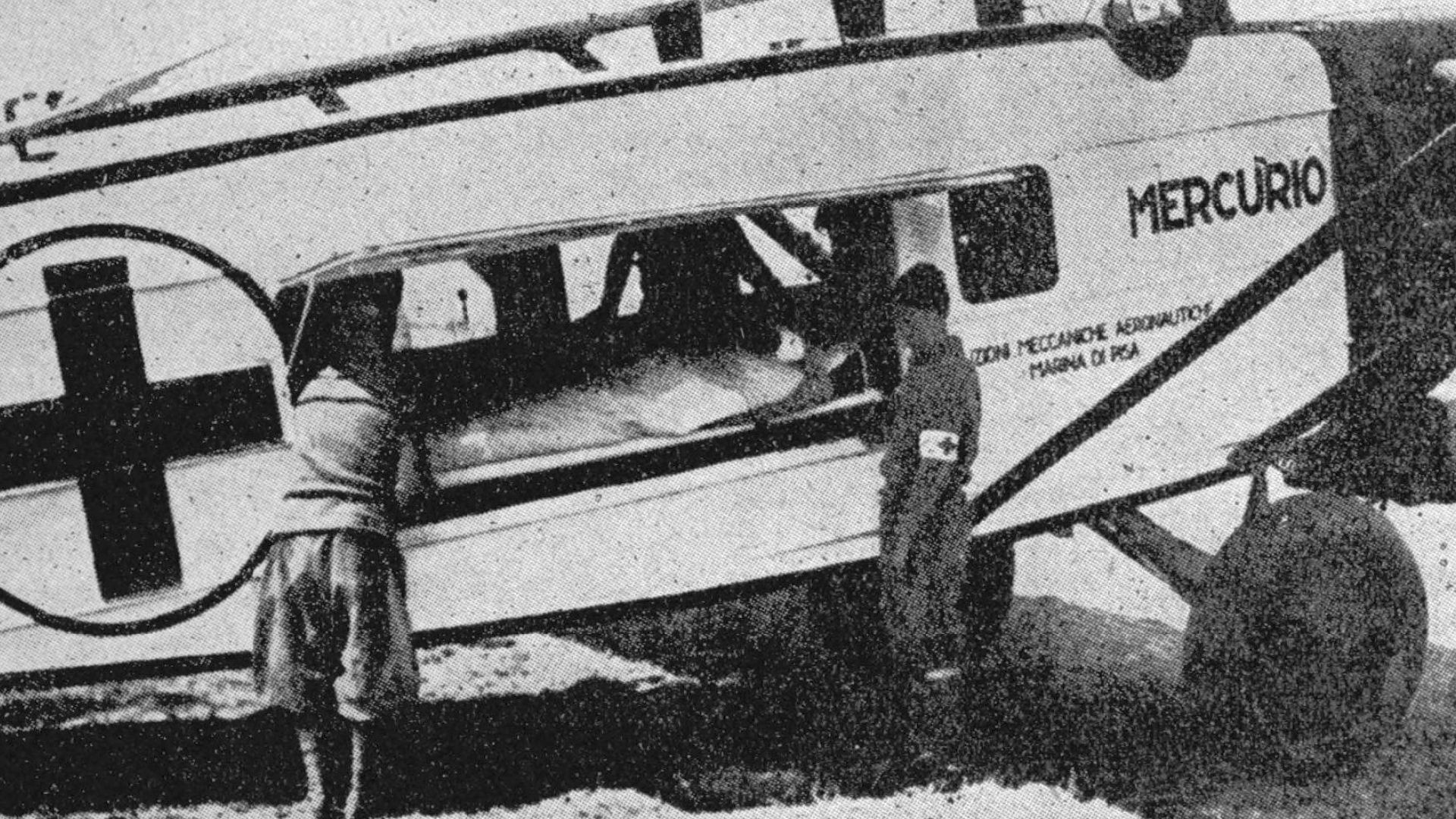
Dornier Merkur ambulance version

First of the Komet series
Do Komet II
Do Komet III
larger, more powerful version capable of seating up to six passengers.
Do B Merkur I
Do B Bal Merkur II
Do C
Military version of the Komet III

- Do C-1: Two-seat fighter.
- Do C-2A: Recognition version.
- Do C-3: Recognition version.
- Do C-4: Do-10, development of C-1.

Do D
A much revised floatplane torpedo bomber version for the Royal Yugoslav Air Force
Do T
An ambulance version

== Operators ==
=== Civil operators ===
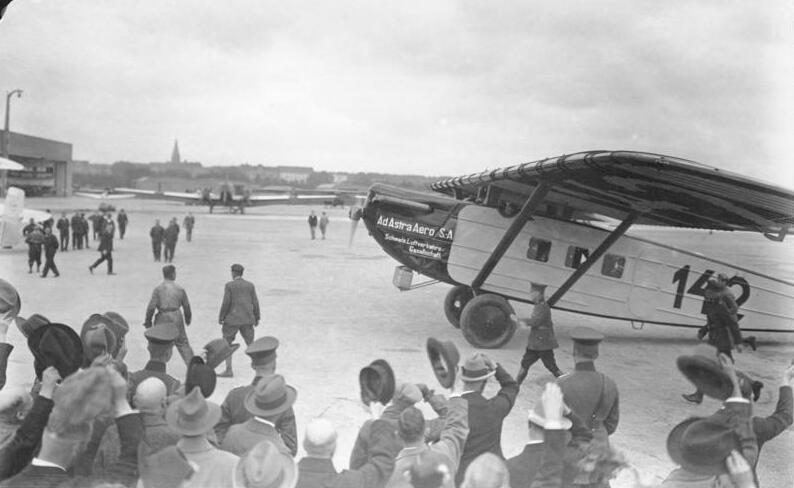
Dornier B-Bal "Merkur" of Ad Astra Aero S.-A.

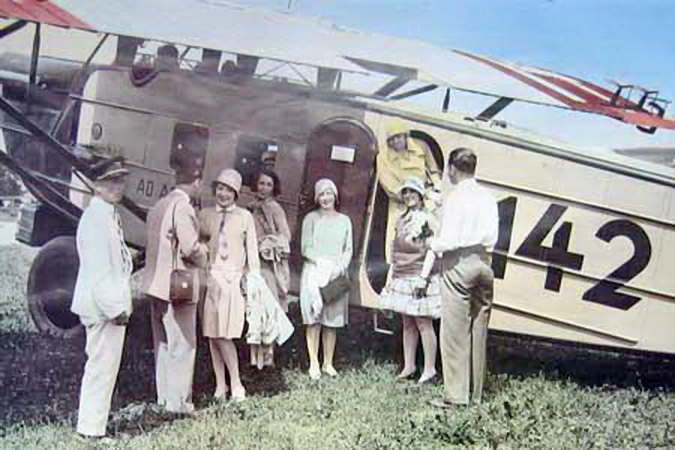
Dornier Merkur (CH 142) operated by Ad Astra Aero (1927)

Colombia

- SCADTA

Germany

- Deutsche Luft Hansa
- Deutsche Luft-Reederei

Switzerland

- Ad Astra Aero

Ukraine

- Ukrvozdukhput

Soviet Union

- Deruluft
- Dobrolyot

=== Military operators ===
Chile

- Chilean Air Force
- Chilean Navy

Colombia

- Colombian Air Force

Kingdom of Yugoslavia

- Yugoslav Royal Navy

== Specifications (Merkur II) ==
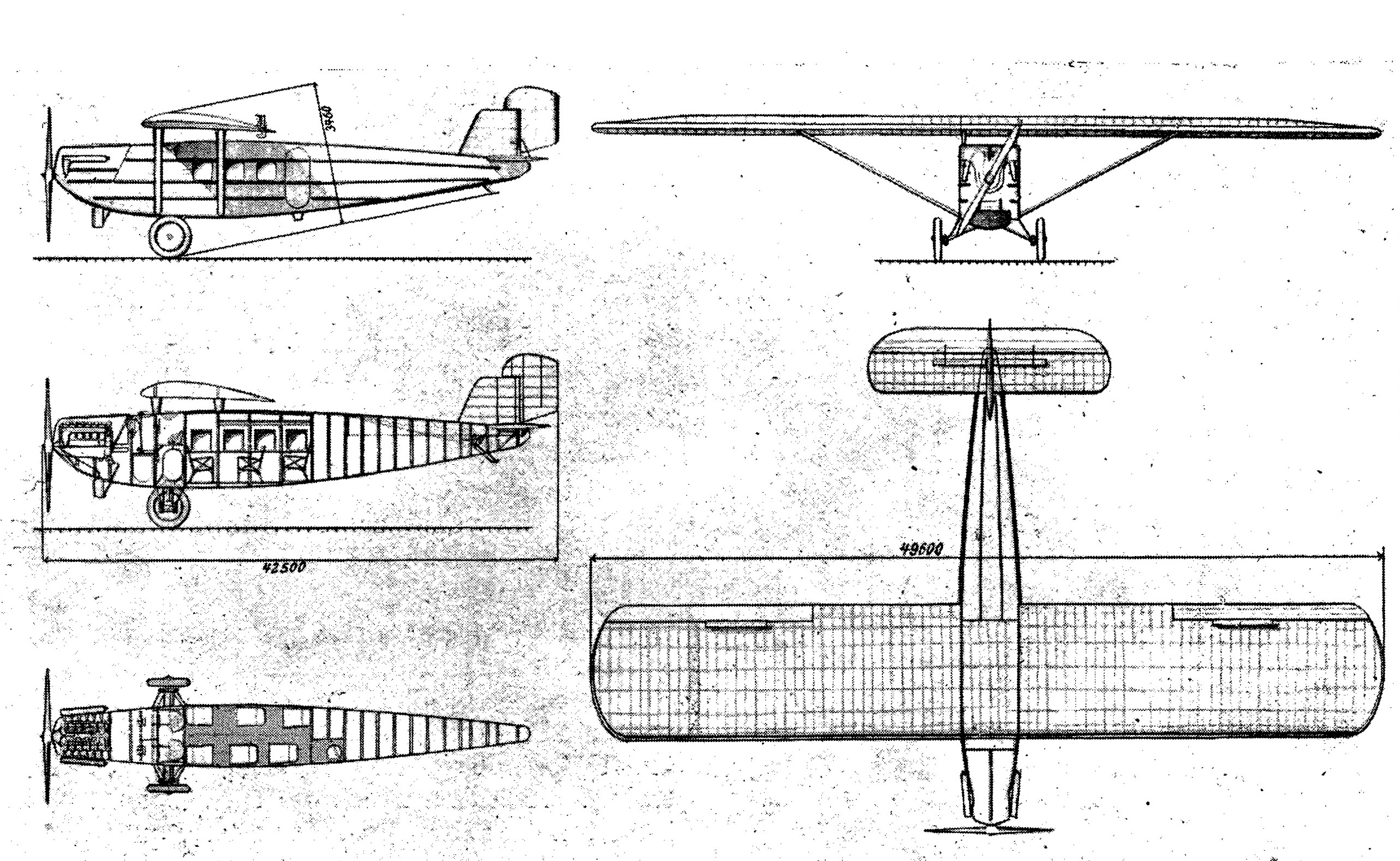
Dornier Merkur 3-view drawing from NACA Aircraft Circular No.30

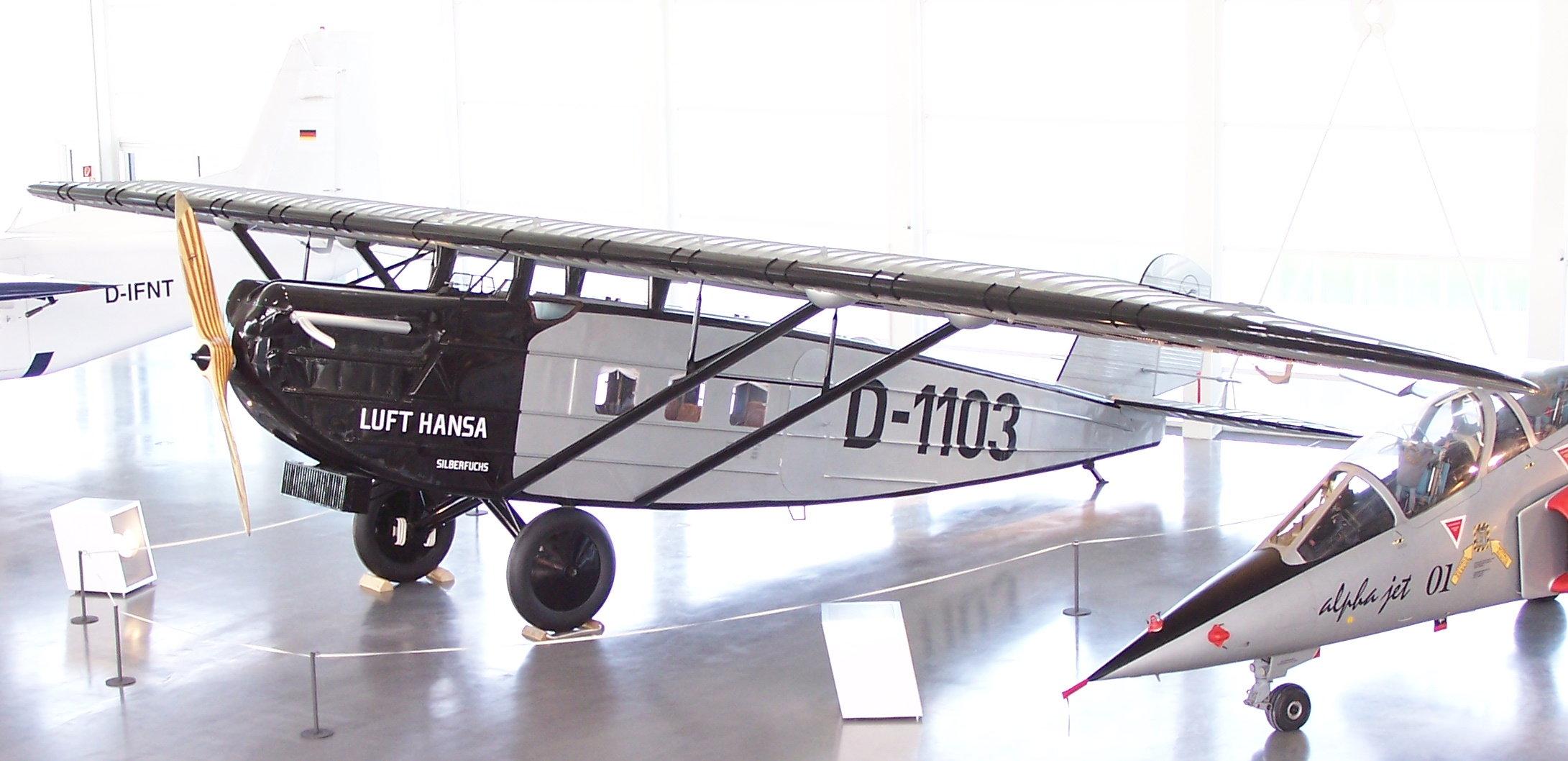
Dornier Merkur replica on display

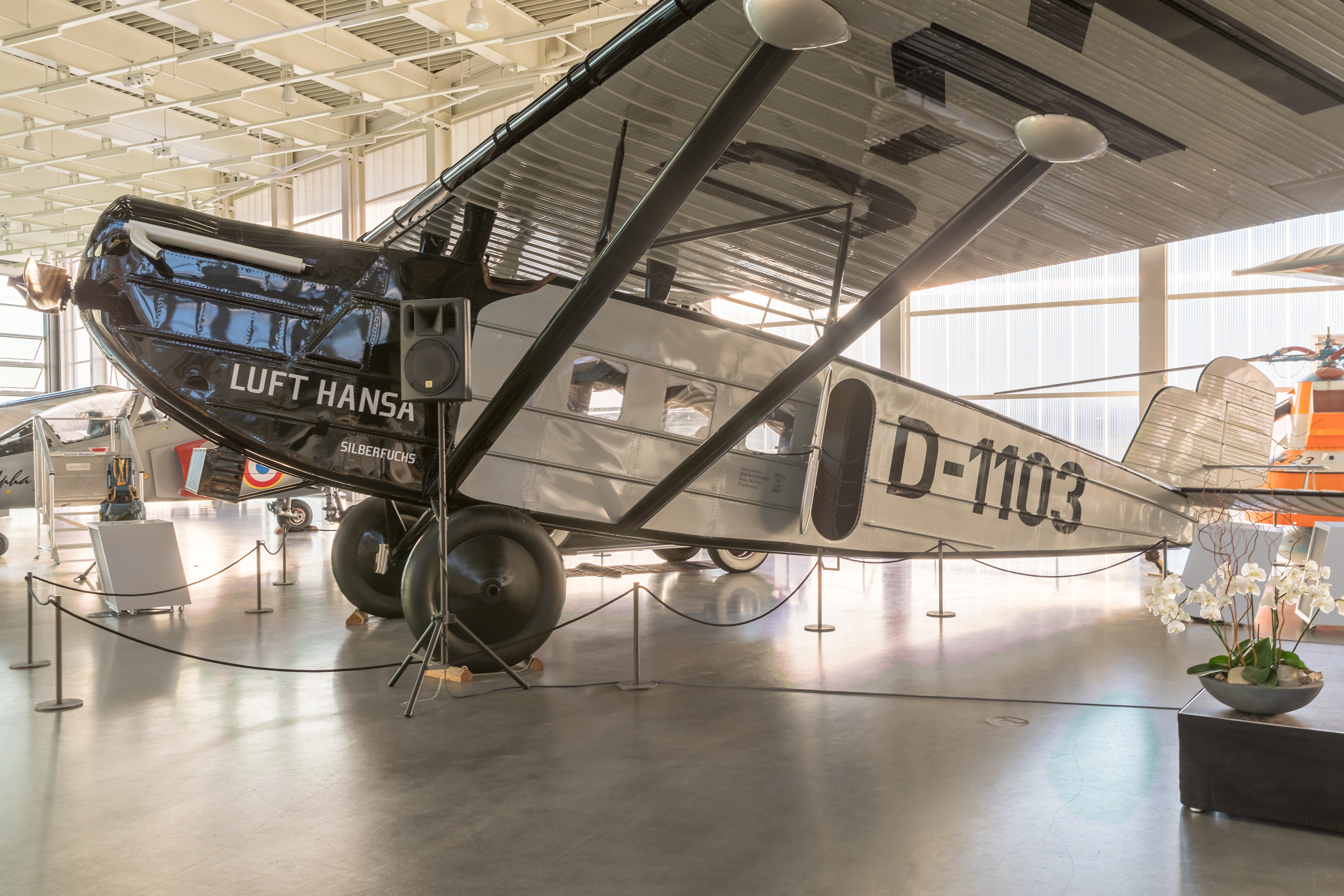
Dornier Merkur (side view)

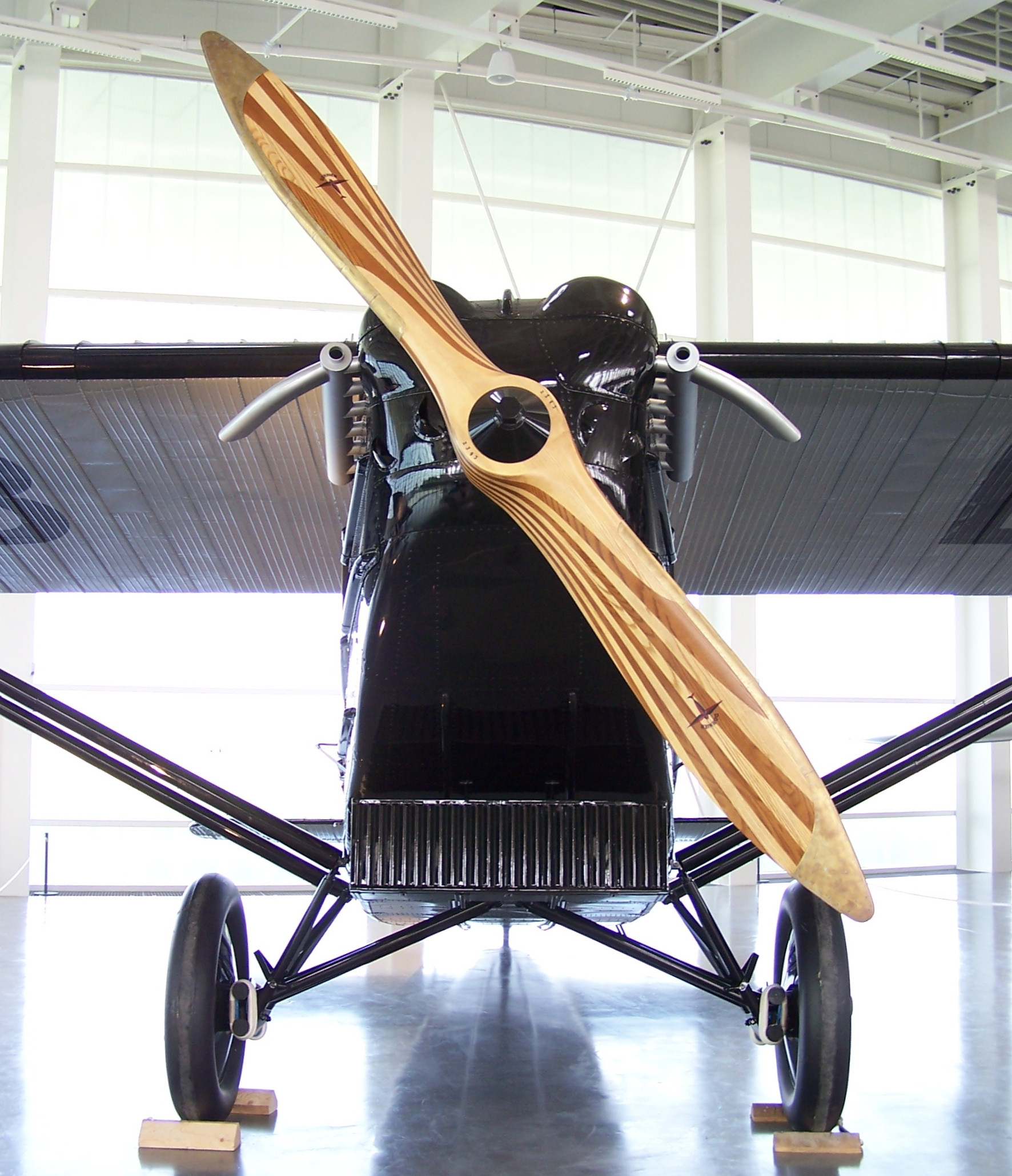
Front view

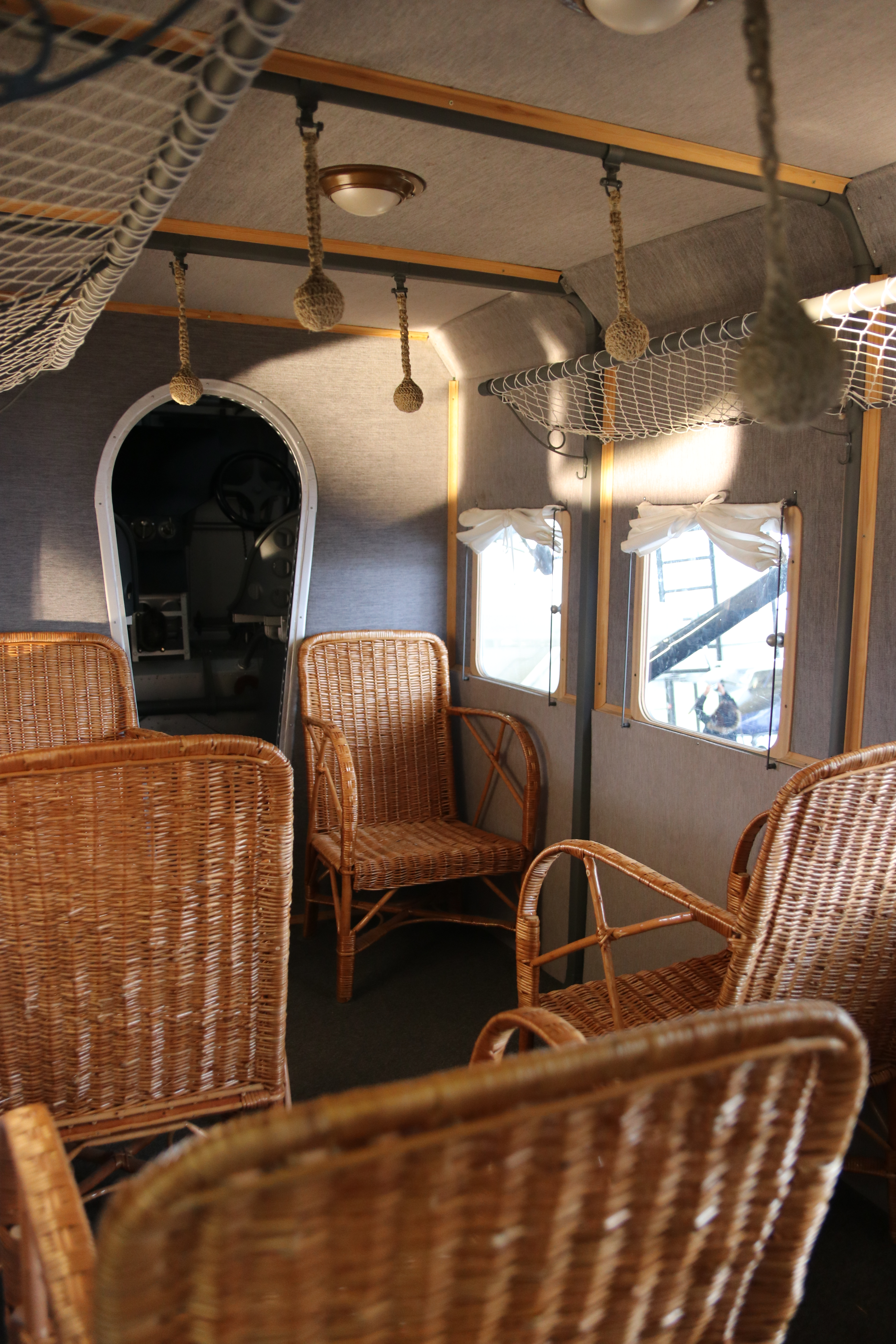
Interior view of the Merkur on display at the Dornier Museum

Data from European Transport Aircraft since 1910

General characteristics

- Crew: one
- Capacity: eight passengers
- Length: 12.5 m (41 ft 0 in)
- Wingspan: 19.6 m (64 ft 4 in)
- Height: 3.56 m (11 ft 8 in)
- Wing area: 62.0 m^{2} (667 sq ft)
- Empty weight: 2,100 kg (4,630 lb)
- Gross weight: 3,600 kg (7,937 lb)
- Powerplant: 1 × BMW VI water-cooled V-12 engine, 450 kW (600 hp)

Performance

- Maximum speed: 200 km/h (120 mph, 110 kn)
- Cruise speed: 180 km/h (110 mph, 97 kn)
- Range: 750 km (466 mi, 405 nmi)
- Service ceiling: 5,200 m (17,100 ft)
