= Kawasaki KDC-2 =

General information
- Type: two/four passenger and mail transport
- National origin: Japan
- Manufacturer: Kawasaki Kōkūki Kōgyō K.K.
- Designer: Richard Vogt and Hisashi Tojo
- Number built: 2

History
- First flight: late 1928
- Retired: April 1935
- Developed from: Kawasaki Type 88

The Kawasaki KDC-2 was a 1920s Japanese light civil transport which Kawasaki developed from its Kawasaki Army Type 88 Reconnaissance Aircraft. Two were built and flown in 1928 and flew both regular and irregular services; the last retired in 1935.

== Design and development ==
As part of a drive to increase awareness of the importance of both military and commercial aviation in 1920s Japan, the Imperial Maritime Defense Volunteer Association ordered two light passenger aircraft from Kawasaki. These aircraft, based on the Type 88 military reconnaissance design, were to be loaned to the Asahi Shimbun newspaper, which was sponsoring a Tokyo-Osaka air service. Since this is an over-water route, the ability to fit floats was specified.

It was an all metal-structured single bay biplane, with fabric-covered wings that were rectangular in plan out to blunted tips. The Type 88's mid-span, broad I-form interplane struts were replaced by N-form ones between the wing spars but its long diagonal struts from the lower wing roots across the bay were retained. The changes resulted from a decrease in the upper span and an increase of both span and chord of the lower wing. The wing centre-section was joined to the fuselage with a pair of outward-leaning N-form cabane struts. There were ailerons on both upper and lower wings, externally connected.

The KDC-2 was powered by a 500–630 hp (370–470 kW) water-cooled V12 BMW VI, its radiator hung below the nose, driving a two-bladed propeller. The flat-sided, all metal fuselage had Dornier-style stressed skin. Its pilot sat in an open cockpit just behind the upper wing trailing edge, ahead of an enclosed, windowed, four seat passenger cabin which could be reconfigured for mailplane or photo-reconnaissance duties. The Type 88's tail was retained, metal-framed and fabric-covered like the wings. The fin had a cropped triangular profile and carried a rounded, rather pointed, balanced rudder which reached down to the keel. Its V-strut braced tailplane was mounted on top of the fuselage and carried roughly rectangular elevators with cut-outs for rudder movement.

The KDC-2 could operate off land or water. As a landplane, it had fixed, conventional landing gear. Its landing wheels were on a single axle and the partly-faired legs and trailing drag struts were mounted on the lower fuselage longerons. Float operations required the fitting of a larger, deeper rudder.

The two KDC-2s built were completed by October 1928 and flew soon after.

== Operational history ==
They were briefly operated between Tokyo and Osaka by Tozo Teiki Kokuka (East-West Regular Air Transport Association) until Nihon Koku Yuso began flying the same route. Instead the Asahi Shimbun organized the All Japan City-Visiting Flight. They flew in formation over many Japanese cities, starting in the east from July 1929 then moving westwards in October. Lectures were given on the coming importance of air transport and generally promoting air-mindedness.

After the tours the two aircraft they flew regular mail flights between Tokyo and Niigata. Asahi Shimbun also used them itself for carrying people and materials, as well as for aerial photography. They carried couriers into Manchuria during the Manchurian Incident of September 1931.

The first KDC-2 was badly damaged during a water take-off in September 1930. Repairs took a year then, in June 1932, it was badly damaged again in a landing accident and abandoned. After its visits to Manchuria the second aircraft returned to regular passenger services from Tokyo to Toyama and Sendai. It was retired in April 1935 after logging 723 flying hours but remained useful as a training airframe with the Student's Aviation League.

== Operators ==
- Ashahi Shimbun newspaper.
- Tozo Teiki Kokukai air transport company.

== Specifications ==
Data from Japanese Aircraft 1910-1941.

General characteristics

- Crew: one
- Capacity: four passengers
- Length: 11.19 m (36 ft 9 in)
- Wingspan: 14.30 m (46 ft 11 in)
- Height: 3.39 m (11 ft 1 in)
- Wing area: 48 m^{2} (520 sq ft)
- Empty weight: 1,747 kg (3,851 lb)
- Gross weight: 2,972 kg (6,552 lb)
- Powerplant: 1 × BMW VI water-cooled V12, 370–470 kW (500–630 hp)
- Propellers: 2-bladed wooden

Performance

- Maximum speed: 222 km/h (138 mph, 120 kn)
- Cruise speed: 150 km/h (93 mph, 81 kn)
- Range: 1,100 km (690 mi, 600 nmi)
- Service ceiling: 5,000 m (16,000 ft)
- Time to altitude: 4 min to 1,000 m (3,300 ft)
