= Dornier Delphin =

Delphin
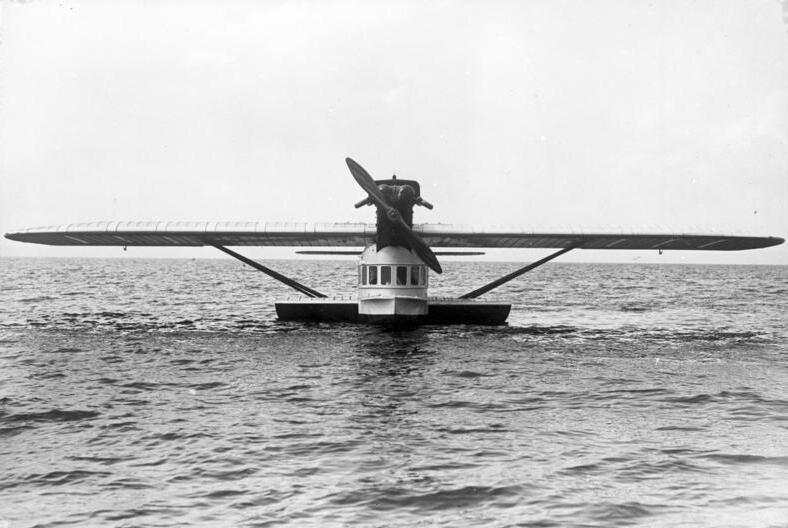
- Delphin III in 1928

General information
- Type: Commercial flying boat
- Manufacturer: Dornier Flugzeugwerke
- Primary users: United States Navy; Royal Navy

History
- First flight: 1920
- Developed into: Dornier Komet

The Dornier Delphin (en: Dolphin) was a 1920s German single-engine commercial flying boat built by Dornier Flugzeugwerke. As well as commercial users, single examples were acquired by the United States Navy and the British Royal Navy for evaluation.

The all-metal design was increasing in popularity, and the Delphin was also important for the development of the Dornier Komet and Merkur land planes.

There was three major version, the first version had an open cockpit and the later versions were enclosed with a stronger engines.

== Development ==
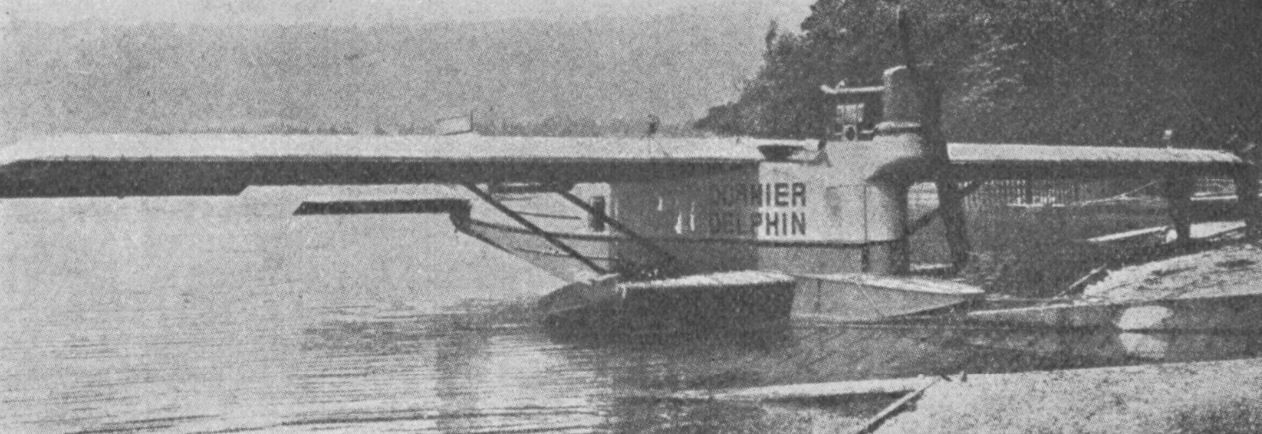
Dornier CS II Delphin photo from L'Aéronautique September 1921

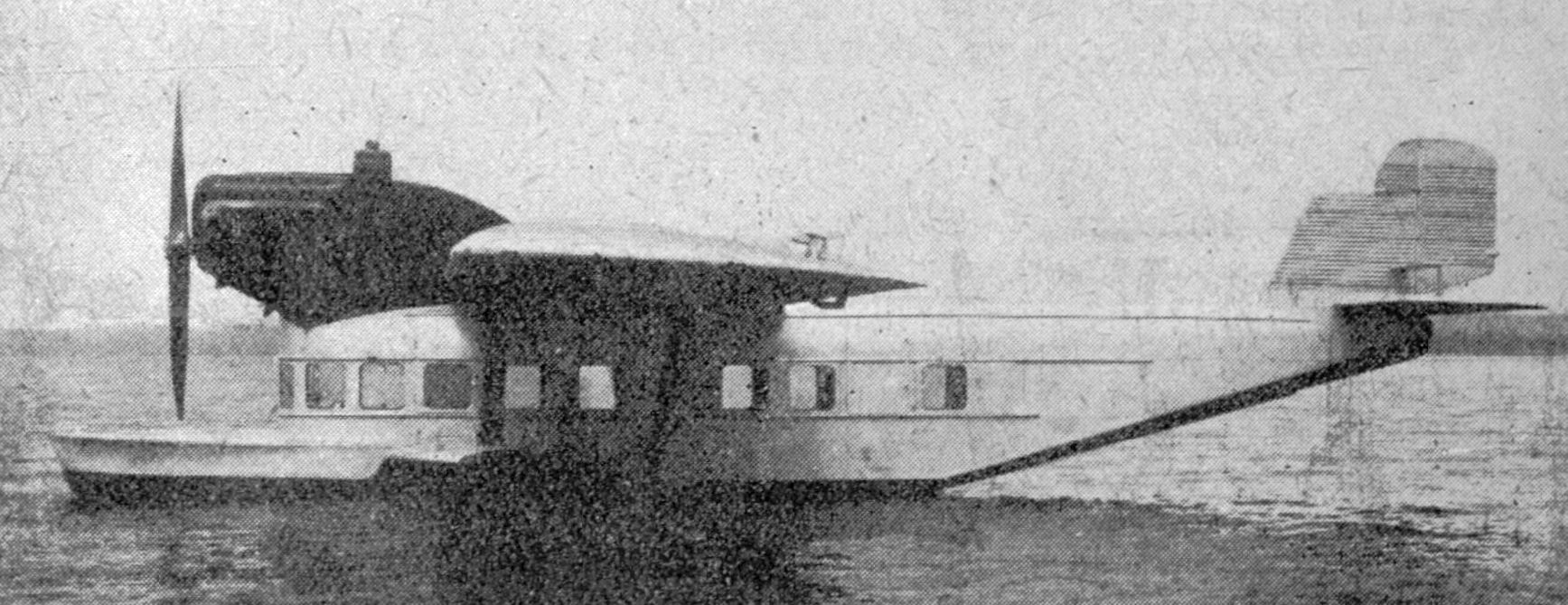
Dornier Do L Delphin III photo from Le Document aéronautique September,1928

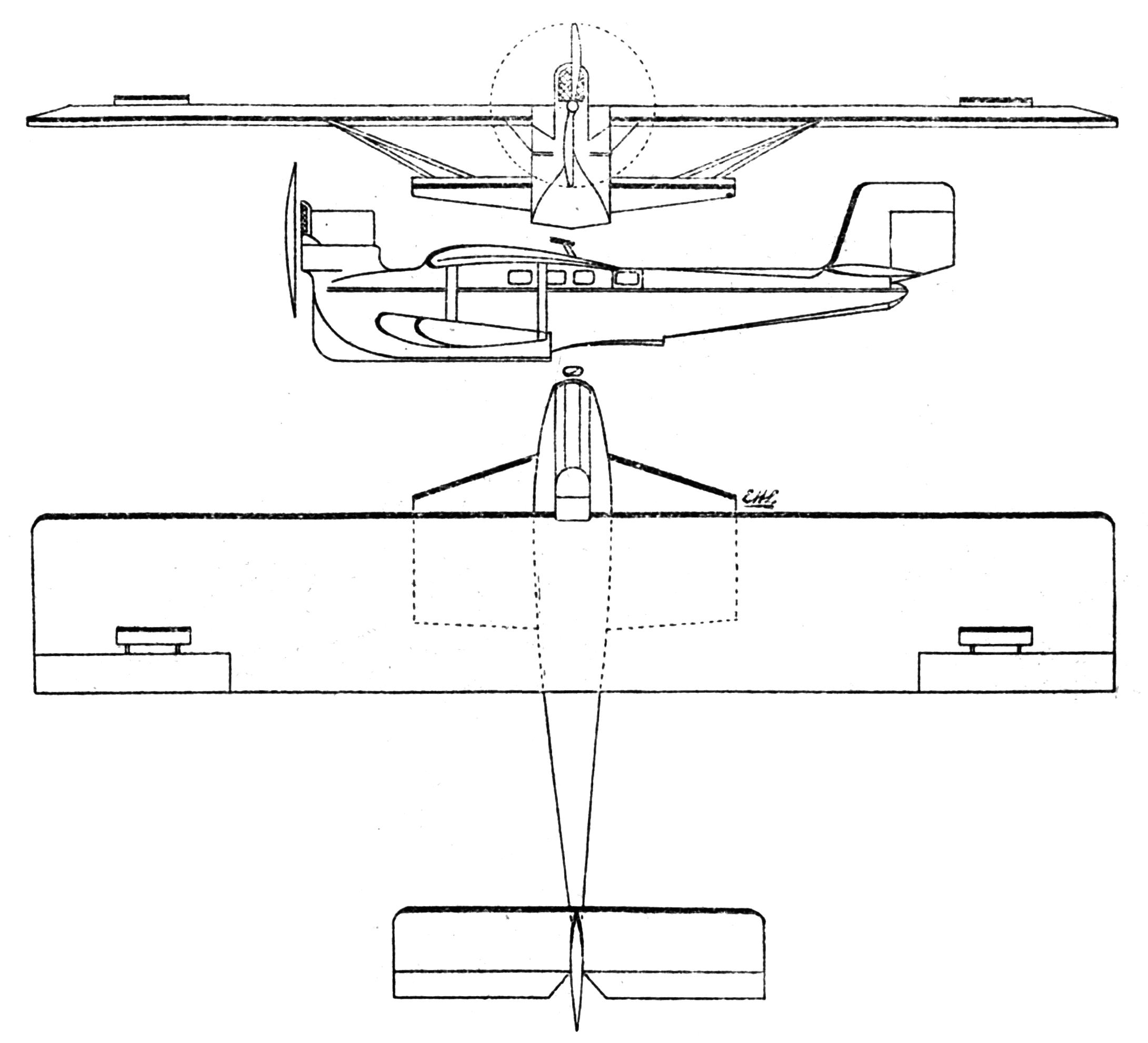
Dorner Delphin open cockpit version

The Delphin I was developed in 1920. It was an all-metal single-engine high-wing monoplane flying boat. It had an enclosed cabin for four-passengers with the wing mounted above, and the nacelle-mounted engine above that. It was powered by a 138 kW (185 hp) BMW IIIa inline engine. The pilot had an open cockpit on the upper surface of the hull behind the engine, which gave him a limited view forward. It first flew on the 24 November 1920. Dornier first tested the design concept and spontoons in place of wingtip floats, with a small three-seater named the Dornier Libelle.

An improved version, the Delphin II, first flew on 15 February 1924, and was powered by either a 186 kW (250 hp) BMW engine or a 194 kW (260 hp) Rolls-Royce Falcon III engine. The enclosed cabin now had room for two crew and five passengers.

Following the success of the Delphin II, a larger version, the Delphin III was developed from 1927. It was powered by a 447 kW (600 hp) BMW VI engine and had a separate flight deck for the two-man crew and a cabin for ten passengers.

A Delphin I was acquired by the United States Navy, and a Delphin III by the Royal Navy, both of whom were interested in evaluating the metal construction.

== Variants ==
Delphin I
Four-passenger version with open cockpit, powered by a 138 kW (185 hp) BMW IIIa inline engine
Delphin II
Five-passenger version, powered by either a 186 kW (250 hp) BMW engine or a 194 kW (260 hp) Rolls-Royce Falcon III engine.
Delphin III
Ten-passenger version, powered by 447 kW (600 hp) BMW VI engine

== Specifications (Delphin III) ==
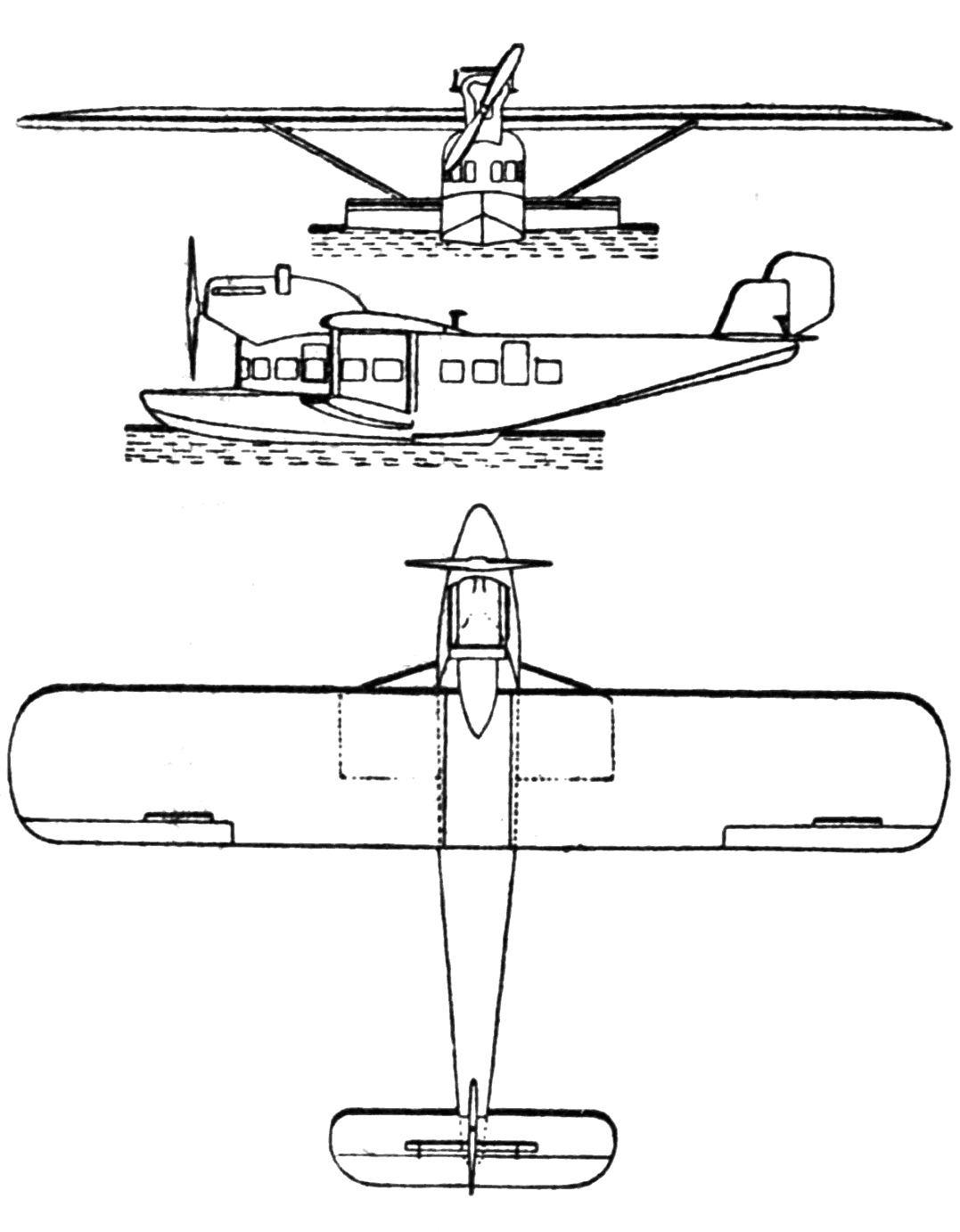
Dornier Do L Delphin III 3-view drawing from Le Document aéronautique September,1928

General characteristics

- Crew: two
- Capacity: ten passengers
- Length: 14.35 m (47 ft 1 in)
- Wingspan: 19.60 m (64 ft 3.75 in)
- Height: 4.05 m (13 ft 3.5 in)
- Wing area: 62 m^{2} (667.38 sq ft)
- Empty weight: 2,900 kg (6,393 lb)
- Gross weight: 3,900 kg (8,598 lb)
- Powerplant: 1 × BMW VI inline piston engine , 447 kW (600 hp)

Performance

- Maximum speed: 180 km/h (112 mph, 97 kn)
- Service ceiling: 4,500 m (14,765 ft)

== See also ==
Related lists

- List of flying boats and floatplanes
