= Albatros L 76 =

1927 German reconnaissance aircraft

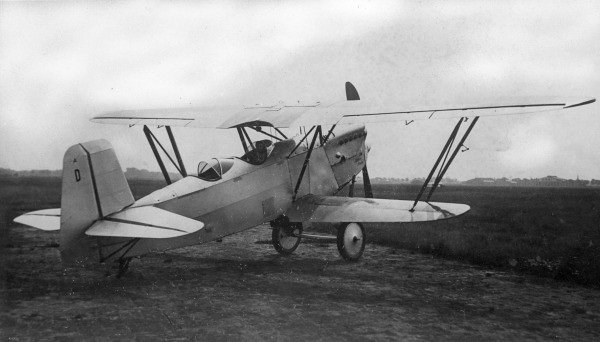

General information
- Type: Reconnaissance aircraft
- National origin: Germany
- Manufacturer: Albatros
- Number built: 6

History
- First flight: 1927

The Albatros L 76 Aeolus was a German military reconnaissance aircraft built by Albatros Flugzeugwerke in 1927. The plane had wooden dual-spar wings with plywood skins supported by N-type struts and a fabric-covered fuselage made of welded steel tubing. The aircraft was used for testing, as well as the training of the Soviet Air Force. It was difficult to fly, and killed many people, including Emil Thuy, who crashed near Smolensk on June 11, 1930, and Paul Jeschonnek, who crashed near Berlin on June 13, 1929. As a result, it had to be improved, leading to the production of the Albatros L 77v, designed by Ernst Heinkel Flugzeugwerke.

== Operators ==
Soviet Union

- Soviet Air Force - Two aircraft, used for tests and trials.

== Specifications ==
General characteristics

- Crew: 2
- Length: 8.55 m (28 ft 1 in)
- Wingspan: 12.76 m (41 ft 10 in)
- Height: 3.74 m (12 ft 3 in)
- Wing area: 27.8 m^{2} (299 sq ft)
- Empty weight: 1,615 kg (3,560 lb)
- Powerplant: 1 × BMW VI inline engine, 450 kW (600 hp)

Performance

- Maximum speed: 235 km/h (146 mph, 127 kn)
