= Arado SSD I =

SSD I
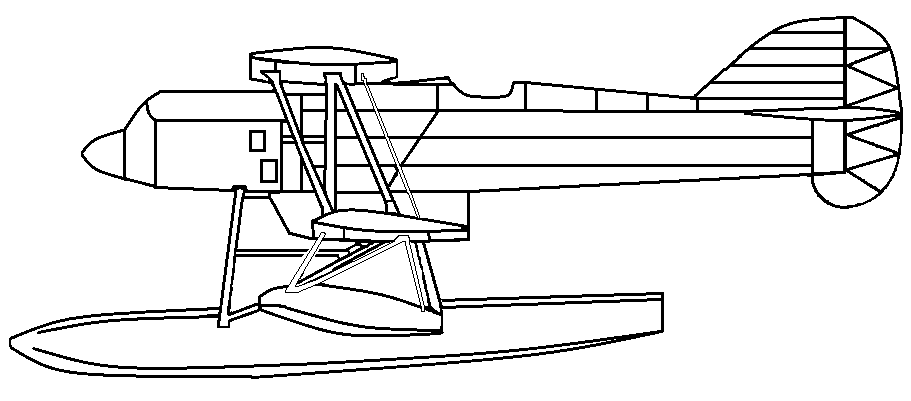

General information
- Type: Fighter seaplane
- Manufacturer: Arado Flugzeugwerke
- Designer: Walter Rethel
- Number built: 1

History
- First flight: 1930

The Arado SSD I was a biplane fighter seaplane developed in Germany in 1930, intended to be launched from catapults on warships. This was an all-new design from Walter Rethel, unrelated to his other fighter designs for Arado of the late 1920s. It was a conventional, unequal-span, staggered biplane, with the slightly gulled-winged top wing attached to the upper fuselage. It was equipped with a single, large float under the fuselage and two outrigger floats near the wingtips. After evaluation at Travemünde, the floats were removed and a simple, wheeled undercarriage was fitted for competitive evaluation alongside the Heinkel HD 38 at Lipetsk. The Heinkel was selected, and the SSD I was relegated to trainer duties with the LVS in 1932.

== Specifications ==
General characteristics

- Crew: one, pilot
- Length: 8.50 m (27 ft 11 in)
- Wingspan: 10.00 m (32 ft 10 in)
- Height: 3.40 m (11 ft 2 in)
- Wing area: 30.9 m^{2} (332 sq ft)
- Empty weight: 1,627 kg (3,587 lb)
- Gross weight: 2,030 kg (4,475 lb)
- Powerplant: 1 × BMW VI , 485 kW (650 hp)

Performance

- Maximum speed: 280 km/h (174 mph, 151 kn)
- Service ceiling: 6,800 m (22,310 ft)
- Rate of climb: 11.1 m/s (2,180 ft/min)

Armament

- 2 × fixed, forward-firing 7.92 mm (.312 in) machine guns
