= Kawasaki Army Type 88 Reconnaissance Aircraft =

Japanese reconnaissance aircraft

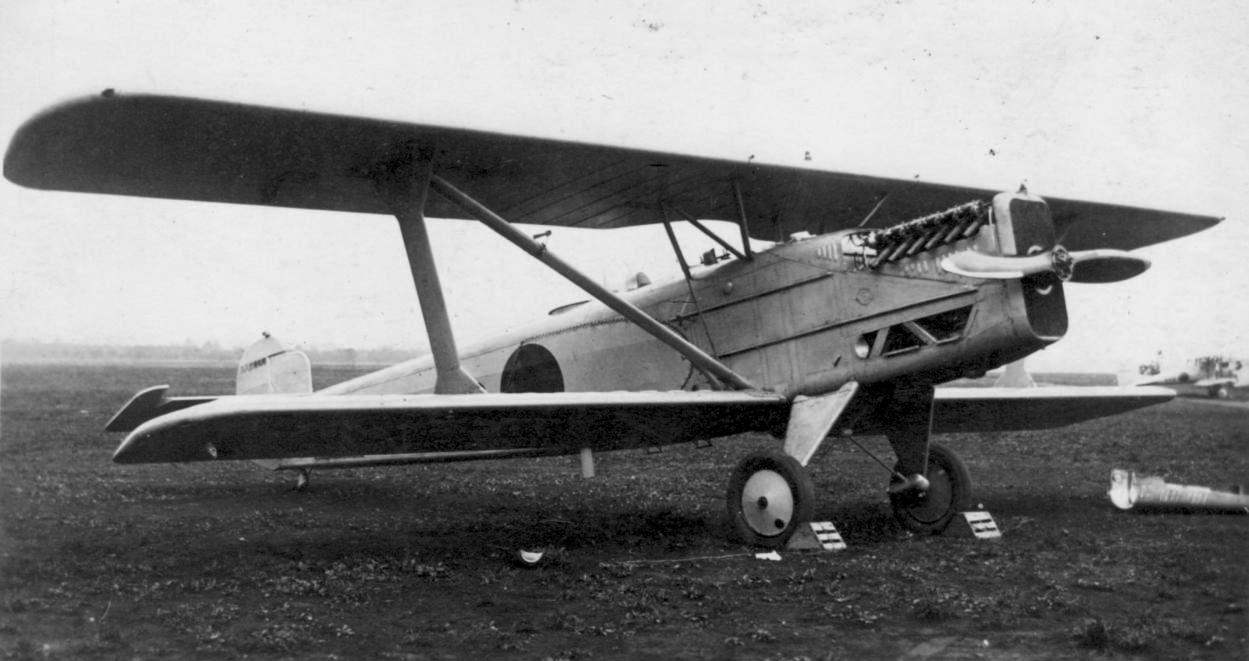
- Kawasaki Army Type 88 Reconnaissance Aircraft

General information
- Type: Reconnaissance and light bomber biplane
- Manufacturer: Kawasaki Kōkūki Kōgyō K.K.
- Designer: Richard Vogt
- Primary user: Imperial Japanese Army Air Force
- Number built: 1117

History
- Manufactured: 1929–1932
- First flight: 1927

The Kawasaki Army Type 88 Reconnaissance Aircraft was a Japanese single-engined biplane designed for Kawasaki by Richard Vogt. Originally known by its company designation KDA-2, it was accepted by the Imperial Japanese Army as the Type 88 Reconnaissance Aircraft. The Type 88 number was designated for the year the aircraft was accepted, which was the year 2588 in the Japanese imperial year calendar, or 1928 in the Gregorian calendar. The basic design was modified into the Type 88 Light Bomber that was used in combat over China in the Second Sino-Japanese War. The Type 88 was built in large numbers and remained in service until 1940.

== Design and development ==
The Army Type 88-1 Reconnaissance Biplane was designed by Richard Vogt as the Kawasaki KDA-2 to meet a Japanese Army requirement for a reconnaissance biplane to replace the Salmson 2. Three KDA-2 prototypes were built by Kawasaki Kōkūki Kōgyō K.K. in 1927. After flight testing, the aircraft was accepted and ordered into production as the Army Type 88-1 Reconnaissance Biplane. The aircraft was of all-metal construction, with a stressed skin forward fuselage, unequal-span wings and a slim angular fuselage, with cross-axle main landing gear. It was powered by a 447 kW (600 hp) BMW VI engine. The Type 88-II was an improved version with an improved engine cowling and a revised tail assembly. By the end of 1931, 710 (including the three prototypes) had been built by both Kawasaki and Tachikawa, who had 187 of the total number.

Between 1929 and 1932, a bomber version was built as the Type 88 Light Bomber, differing in having a strengthened lower wing and an additional pair of centre-section struts. Bomb racks were located under the fuselage and lower wings. A total of 407 were produced. A transport variant was developed as the KDC-2 with room for a pilot and four passengers in an enclosed cabin. Only two KDC-2s were built; one was tested on floats.

== Operational history ==
Both reconnaissance and bomber versions saw action with the Imperial Japanese Army Air Force during the Second Sino-Japanese War in Manchuria, and while in service in 1937 during fighting at the Battle of Shanghai, losses in early 1938, including at the Battle of Taierzhuang phased the Type 88 out of frontline service.

== Variants ==
KDA-2
Three prototypes in 1927.
Type 88-I Reconnaissance Biplane.
Production reconnaissance biplane.
Type 88-II Reconnaissance Biplane
Improved version of the 88-I, 707 built of both the 88-I and 88-II.
Type 88 Light Bomber.
Light bomber able to carry 200 kg (440 lb) of bombs, 407 built.
KDC-2
Transport variant, two built.

== Operators ==
Japan

- Imperial Japanese Army Air Force

Manchukuo

- Manchukuo Imperial Air Force

== Specifications (88-II) ==
Data from Japanese Aircraft 1910–1941 The Illustrated Encyclopedia of Aircraft (Part Work 1982–1985). Orbis Publishing. p. 2238.

General characteristics

- Crew: 2
- Length: 12.8 m (42 ft 0 in)
- Wingspan: 15.00 m (49 ft 2.75 in)
- Height: 3.40 m (11 ft 2 in)
- Wing area: 48 m^{2} (517 sq ft)
- Empty weight: 1,800 kg (3,968 lb)
- Gross weight: 2,850 kg (6,283 lb)
- Powerplant: 1 × BMW VI , 447 kW (600 hp)

Performance

- Maximum speed: 221 km/h (137 mph, 119 kn)
- Endurance: 6 hours
- Service ceiling: 6,200 m (20,350 ft)

Armament

- 2 × 7.7 mm (0.303 in) machine guns (one fixed and one manual)
