= Dornier Do 10 =

Fighter aircraft model by Dornier

Do 10
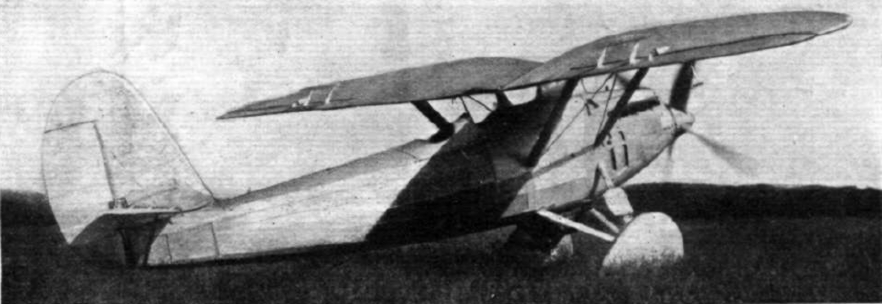

General information
- Type: Fighter aircraft
- National origin: Germany
- Manufacturer: Dornier Flugzeugwerke

History
- First flight: 24 July 1931
- Developed from: Dornier Komet

The Dornier Do 10, originally designated Dornier Do C4, was the name given by the Reichsluftfahrtministerium (RLM) of a pre-World War II German aircraft.

It was a two-seat parasol-wing monoplane, intended to be used as a fighter. Two prototypes were built in 1931 to fulfil a requirement for a two-seat fighter. Having failed to gain a production order, the Do C4 / Do 10 was used to test a tilting engine installation and propellers to suit, for STOL tests.

== Specifications ==
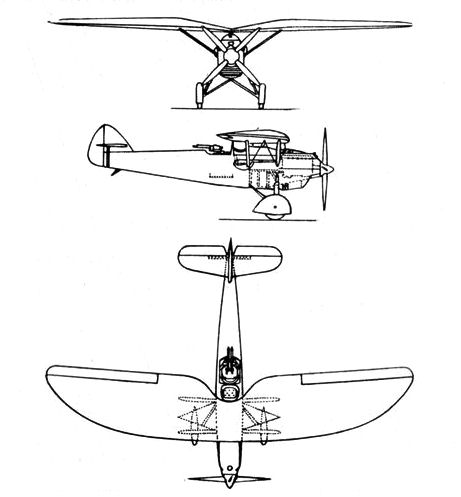
Dornier Do C4 3-view drawing from L'Aerophile July 1934

Type	Two-seat fighter		
Engine	Rolls-Royce Kestrel IIIS	BMW VI 7.3 (703)	Hispano-Suiza 12 Xbrc (Ybre?)
Power	391 kW (525 hp)	485 kW (650 hp)	515 kW (691 hp)
Dimensions	Length: 10.60 m (34 ft 9 in); Height: 4.30 m (14 ft 1 in); Wingspan: 15.00 m (49 ft 3 in); Wing area: 32.40 m^{2} (348.8 sq ft)	Length: 10.50 m (34 ft 5 in); Height: 4.44 m (14 ft 7 in); Wingspan: 15.00 m (49 ft 3 in); Wing area: 32.40 m^{2} (348.8 sq ft)	Length: 10.60 m (34 ft 9 in); Height: 4.30 m (14 ft 1 in); Wingspan: 15.00 m (49 ft 3 in); Wing area 32.40 m^{2} (348.8 sq ft)
Weights	Empty: 1,600 kg (3,500 lb); Loaded: 2,300 kg (5,100 lb); Max takeoff: 2,300 kg (5,100 lb)	Empty: 2,200 kg (4,900 lb); Loaded: 2,640 kg (5,820 lb); Max takeoff: 2,640 kg (5,820 lb)	Empty: 1,600 kg (3,500 lb); Loaded: 2,640 kg (5,820 lb)
Performance	Max. speed: 278 km/h (150 kn) at sea level; Max. speed: 315 km/h (170 kn) at 3,500 m (11,500 ft); Range: 800 km (430 nmi); Service ceiling: 9,100 m (29,900 ft); Wing load: 71.0 kg/m^{2} (14.5 lb/ft^{2})	Max. speed: 288 km/h (179 mph) at sea level; Cruising speed 250 km/h (130 kn); Climb to 1000 m: 1 min 54 s; Climb to 5000 m: 12 min 48 s; Initial climb rate : 8.80 m/s (1,732 ft/min); Range: 800 km (430 nmi); Service ceiling: 7,500 m (24,600 ft); Wing load: 81.0 kg/m^{2} (16.6 lb/ft^{2})	Max. speed: 272 km/h (147 kn) at sea level; Max. speed: 318 km/h (172 kn) at 3500 m; Range: 800 km (430 nmi); Service ceiling: 9,500 m (31,200 ft)
Armament	Four × MG 08/15 machine guns (two forward, two in rear turret)		

== Sources ==
- Luftwaffe 39-45 (in Portuguese)
- Histaviation.com
- Virtual Aviation Museum

Notes

Bibliography

- Green, William and Swanborough, Gordon. The Complete Book of Fighters. New York: Smithmark, 1994. ISBN 0-8317-3939-8.

(Information on this model is difficult to come by and the nature of the relationship between C1/C4/10 is not yet totally resolved)
