= Focke-Wulf Fw 42 =

Medium bomber project, Germany, cancelled c.1934

Fw 42
- Wind tunnel model of the final configuration.

General information
- Type: Bomber
- Manufacturer: Focke-Wulf
- Designer: Henrich Focke
- Primary user: Luftwaffe (intended)
- Number built: None

History
- Developed from: Focke-Wulf F 19

The Focke-Wulf Fw 42 was a design for a twin-engined medium bomber, of canard configuration, that was designed by Focke-Wulf Flugzeugbau AG in Germany in the early 1930s. Several air forces expressed interest in the aircraft. However, despite its advanced design being proven sound in wind tunnel testing, the Fw 42 failed to win a contract for development, and no examples of the type were ever built.

== Development and design ==
Designed by Heinrich Focke in response to a 1929 specification issued by the Air Department of the Reichswehr, the design of the Fw 42 was based on that of Focke's earlier F 19 Ente (German: "Duck") light transport.

The aircraft's design featured a long, slender fuselage with gun positions at each end, an aft-mounted wing with a "tail-first", or canard, configuration, fully retractable tricycle landing gear, and an internal bomb bay. The aircraft was planned to be operated by a crew of six.

Early versions of the Fw 42 design featured vertical stabilisers mounted on the end of the wing, with additional fins located just outboard of the engine nacelles, for a four-tail arrangement. In addition, these early concepts featured the canard being mounted above the fuselage in a parasol arrangement, which had been used on the F 19. As the design was developed between 1931 and 1933, the canard was moved from the top to the bottom of the fuselage, to improve vision for the pilot and field of fire for the forward gunner. In addition, wind tunnel tests of the four-fin configuration showed that it did not provide a significant advantage over a single, large fin, and so the latter configuration was adopted for simplicity.

The Fw 42 was intended to be powered by two 560-kilowatt (750 hp) BMW VI 12-cylinder, liquid-cooled engines, which were expected to provide a top speed of nearly 300 kilometres per hour (190 mph), and a range of over 1,200 kilometres (750 mi).

== Evaluation and cancellation ==
A full-scale mockup, including working gun turrets, of the Fw 42's final design was constructed. Focke-Wulf promoted the design for export sales as well as Luftwaffe service, with the Russians and Japanese reported as expressing interest in the type, and one or both nations' representatives examining the mockup. However, despite the fact that wind tunnel tests of the design's unconventional configuration provided promising results, indicating that the concept was sound, no contracts for development were ever issued, and the Fw 42 project was abandoned.

=== Recovery of data ===
At the end of World War II, technical information on the Fw 42 was lost in the destruction of sensitive data by Focke-Wulf. However, in 1969, excavation of the site on which the data had been stored revealed that the folders containing information on the aircraft had survived nearly completely undamaged.

== Specifications ==
General characteristics

- Crew: six
- Length: 17.7 m (58 ft 1 in)
- Wingspan: 25 m (82 ft 0 in)
- Height: 4.3 m (14 ft 1 in)
- Wing area: 108 m^{2} (1,160 sq ft)
- Empty weight: 5,600 kg (12,346 lb)
- Max takeoff weight: 9,000 kg (19,842 lb)
- Powerplant: 2 × BMW VI liquid-cooled inline piston engines, 560 kW (750 hp) each
- Propellers: 4-bladed, 3.8 m (12 ft 6 in) diameter

Performance

- Maximum speed: 310 km/h (190 mph, 170 kn)
- Cruise speed: 260 km/h (160 mph, 140 kn)
- Range: 1,200 km (750 mi, 650 nmi)
- Service ceiling: 6,000 m (20,000 ft)

Armament

- Guns: Two machine guns in nose and tail positions
- Bombs: 1,000 kilograms (2,200 lb) in internal bay

== See also ==
Related development

- Focke-Wulf F 19

Aircraft of comparable role, configuration, and era

- Douglas DB-7
- Miles Libellula

Related lists

- List of bomber aircraft
- List of military aircraft of Germany
- List of RLM aircraft designations
