= Albatros L 77v =

L 77

General information
- Type: Reconnaissance aircraft
- Manufacturer: Albatros Flugzeugwerke
- Number built: 4

History
- First flight: 1928

The Albatros L 77v was a German tandem two-seat reconnaissance fighter sesquiplane, four examples of which were built under license for Albatros Flugzeugwerke by Ernst Heinkel Flugzeugwerke in 1928. Based upon the L 76 Aeolus reconnaissance trainer, the aircraft was powered by a 450 kW (600 hp) BMW VI 5.5 water-cooled V12 engine.

Like the L 76, the L 77v had a fabric-covered welded-steel fuselage and wooden dual-spar wings with plywood skins supported by N-type struts. It was armed with twin 7.92 mm (.312 in) machine guns in fixed forward-firing positions and a third on a ring mounting in the rear cockpit.

Three of the aircraft saw service performing armament trials in Lipetsk in the Soviet Union; these included one aircraft testing a free-mounted 20 mm cannon. The fourth aircraft had been destroyed while undergoing tests in March 1929. Between December 1929 and their retirement in October 1931, the surviving L 77vs were based at the Staaken Erprobungsstelle (Test Centre).

== Specifications (L 77v) ==
General characteristics

- Crew: two, pilot and observer
- Length: 8.45 m (27 ft 9 in)
- Wingspan: 12.76 m (41 ft 10 in)
- Height: 3.9 m (12 ft 10 in)
- Wing area: 27.8 m^{2} (299 sq ft)
- Powerplant: 1 × BMW VI , 450 kW (600 hp)

Performance

- Maximum speed: 220 km/h (140 mph, 120 kn)

Armament

- 2 × fixed, forward-firing 7.92 mm (.312 in) machine guns
- 1 × flexible 7.92 (.312 in) mm machine gun for observer
- 2 × 50 kg (110 lb) bombs
