= Heinkel HD 38 =

Type of aircraft

HD 38
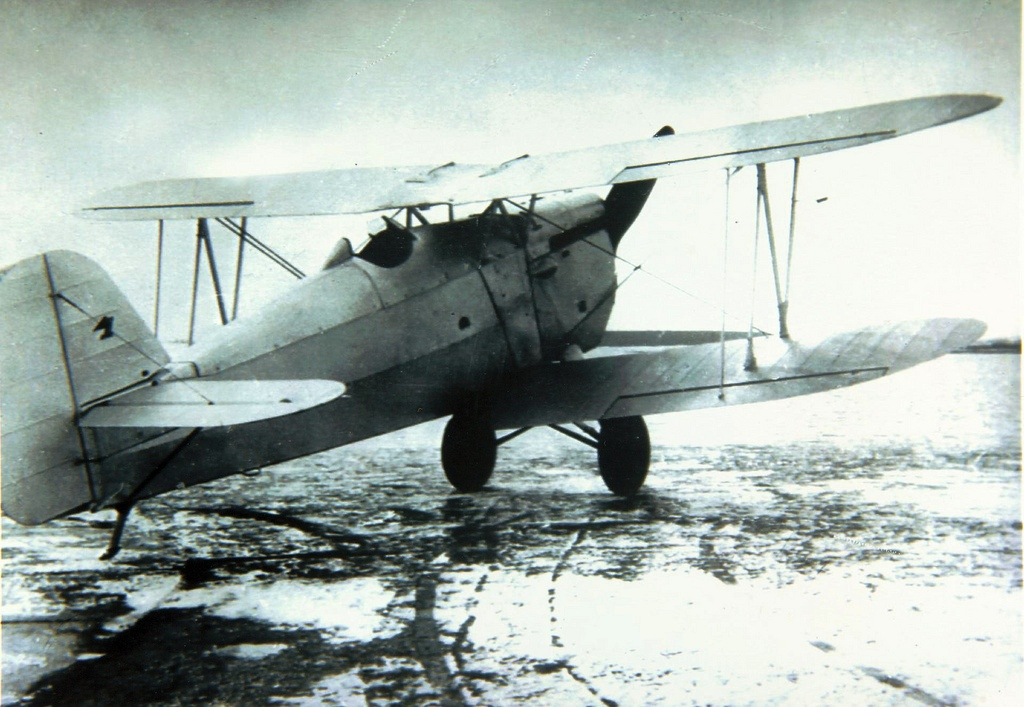
- Heinkel HD 38

General information
- Type: Fighter
- National origin: Germany
- Manufacturer: Heinkel
- Primary user: Reichswehr
- Number built: 12

History
- First flight: 1928

The Heinkel HD 38 was a fighter aircraft developed in Germany in the late 1920s. It was a compact, single-bay biplane with staggered wings of unequal span, braced with N-type interplane struts, a refined version of the HD 37 that had been evaluated and rejected by the Reichswehr for use at the secret training facility at Lipetsk. The HD 38 was designed in the hope of capturing a different niche - that of a seaplane fighter, and was designed with a twin pontoon undercarriage that could be quickly removed and replaced with wheels. It was accepted in this role, but did not serve in it for long before being relegated to general training duties. Even then, it was not long before Germany abandoned the Lipetsk base to the Soviet Union.

== Specifications (with wheels) ==
General characteristics

- Crew: one pilot
- Length: 7.50 m (24 ft 7 in)
- Wingspan: 10.00 m (32 ft 10 in)
- Height: 3.56 m (11 ft 8 in)
- Wing area: 30.8 m^{2} (332 sq ft)
- Empty weight: 1,520 kg (3,360 lb)
- Gross weight: 1,850 kg (4,080 lb)
- Powerplant: 1 × BMW VI , 560 kW (750 hp)

Performance

- Maximum speed: 290 km/h (180 mph, 160 kn)
- Service ceiling: 6,700 m (22,000 ft)
- Rate of climb: 13.9 m/s (2,740 ft/min)

Armament

- 2 × fixed, forward-firing machine guns
