= BMW VI =

Aircraft engine family by BMW

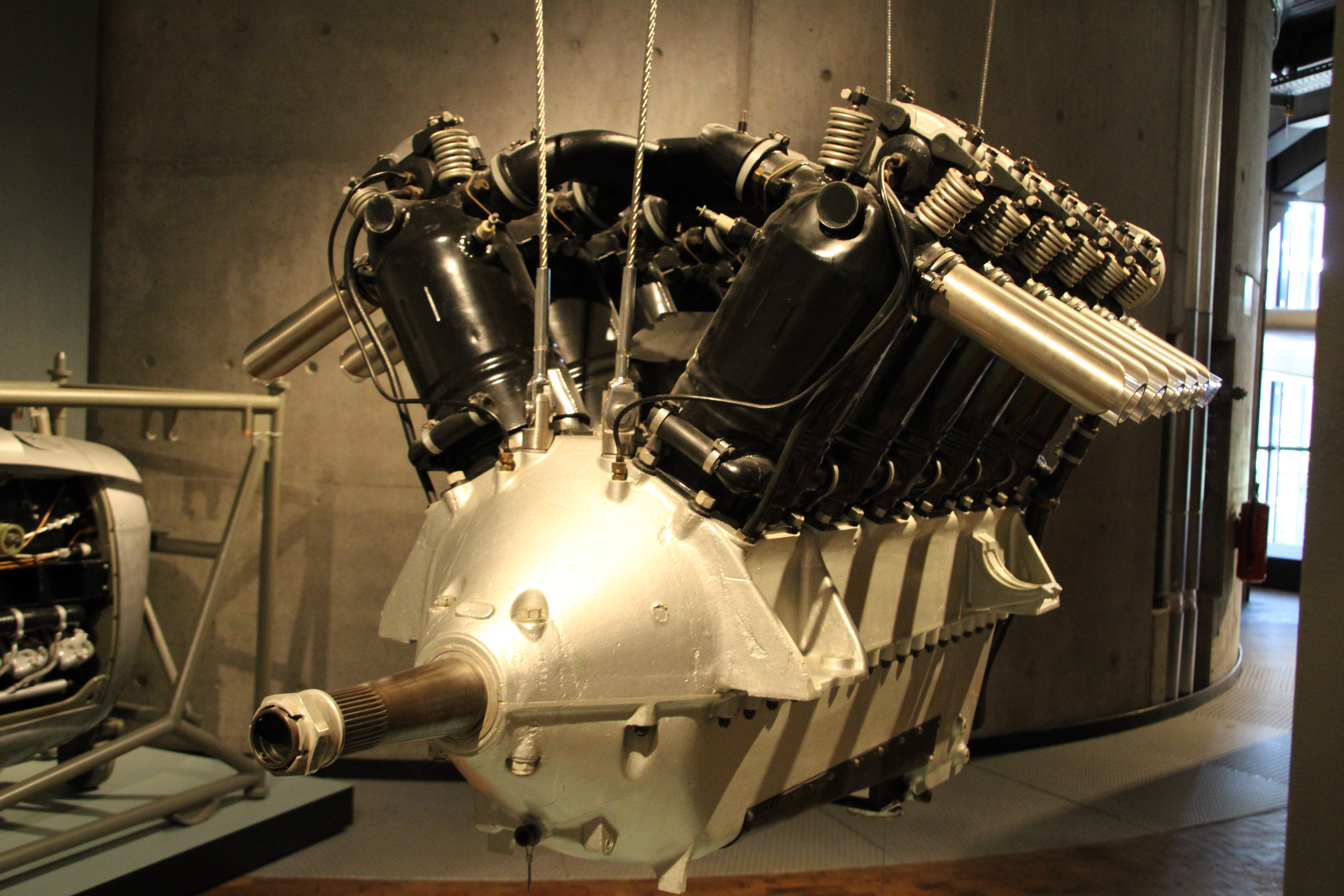
- BMW VI at the Technik-Museum Berlin
- Type: V12 engine
- Manufacturer: BMW
- First run: 1926
- Major applications: Heinkel He 51; Kawasaki Ki-10
- Developed from: BMW IV
- Developed into: BMW VII; Mikulin M-17

The BMW VI was a water-cooled V12 aircraft engine built in Germany in the 1920s. It was one of the most important German aero engines in the years leading up to World War II, with thousands built. It was further developed as the BMW VII and BMW IX, although these saw considerably less use. It was also produced in the Soviet Union as the M-17 and Japan as the Kawasaki Ha-9.

== Design and development ==
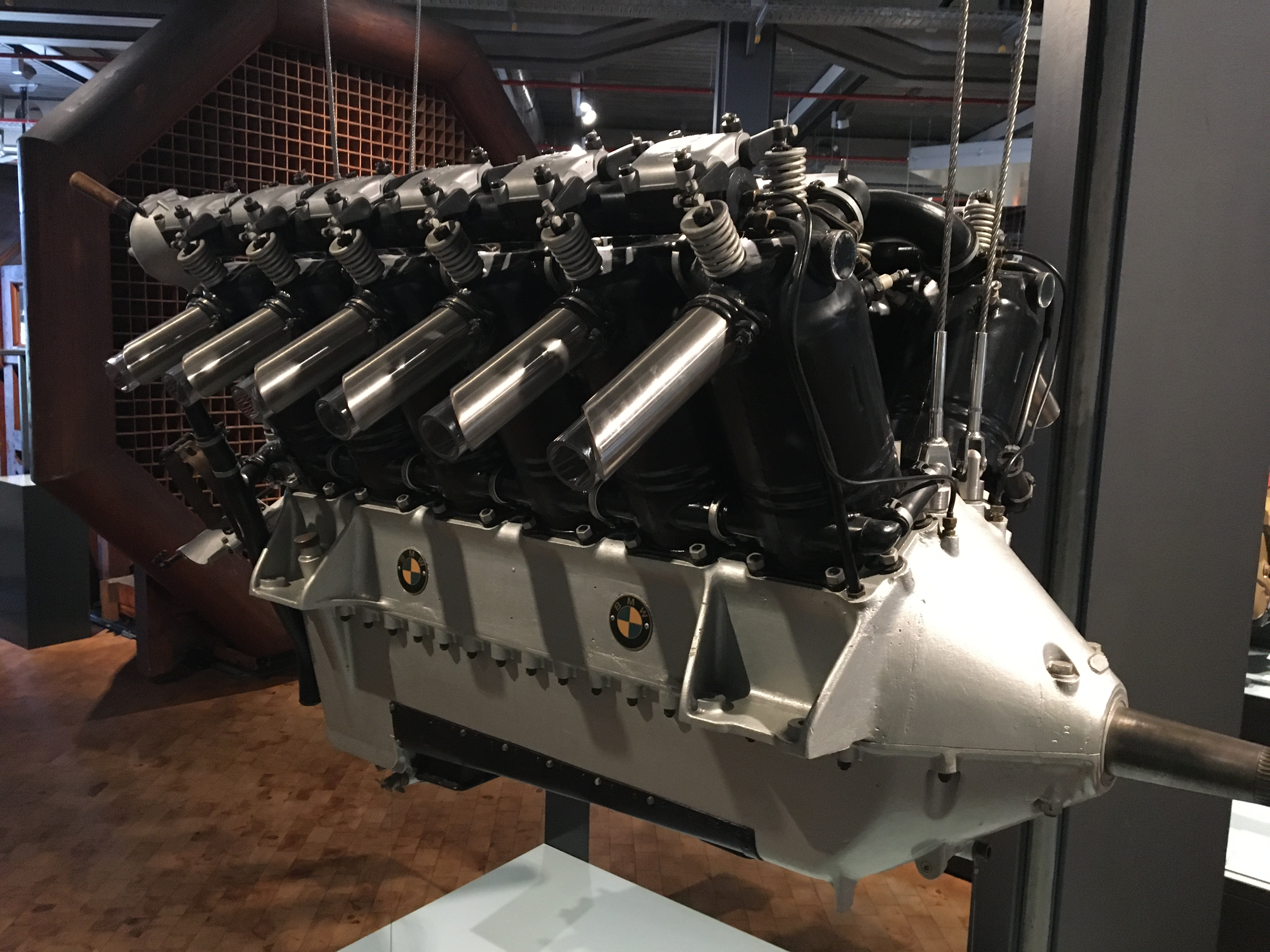
Front view of the BMW VI

The BMW VI was the first twelve-cylinder engine built by the BMW. It essentially consisted of two cylinder banks from the six-cylinder BMW IV bolted to a common cast aluminium crankcase at a 60-degree included angle between the cylinder banks. Series production commenced in 1926 after type approval had been granted. From 1930 on, after 1000 engines of the BMW VI type had already been delivered, Germany was again permitted to construct military aircraft. The sudden additional demand resulted in the production figures increasing rapidly. In 1933 the BMW VI was used for BMW's first experiments with direct fuel injection.

The BMW VI was the chosen source of power for numerous record-breaking and long-distance flights, including an east-to-west crossing of the Atlantic in 1930 and a round-the world flight in 1932, both by Wolfgang von Gronau in an open Dornier Wal flying boat powered by two BMW VI engines.

The BMW VI was put to unusual use as a power unit for the "Rail Zeppelin" high-speed railcar. Many versions of the BMW VI engine were developed, and it was built under license in Japan and the Soviet Union. This was further evidence of the reliability of an engine with which BMW made a fundamental contribution to the build-up of German air transport. At least 9,200 were built between 1926 and 1938. The engine was license-built in the Soviet Union under the supervision of Mikulin, who then further developed it as the M-17. More license built engines were produced by Kawasaki Heavy Industries in Japan as the Kawasaki Ha9 (long designation:- Army Type 98 850hp Liquid Cooled In-line).

== Variants ==
5.5, 6 or 7.3 denotes compression ratio. No additional letter denotes BMW carburetor and direct-drive propeller (7.3), u denotes a propeller reduction gear (7.3u), z denotes Zenith carburetor (7.3z), zu denotes Zenith carburetor and propeller reduction gear (7.3zu).

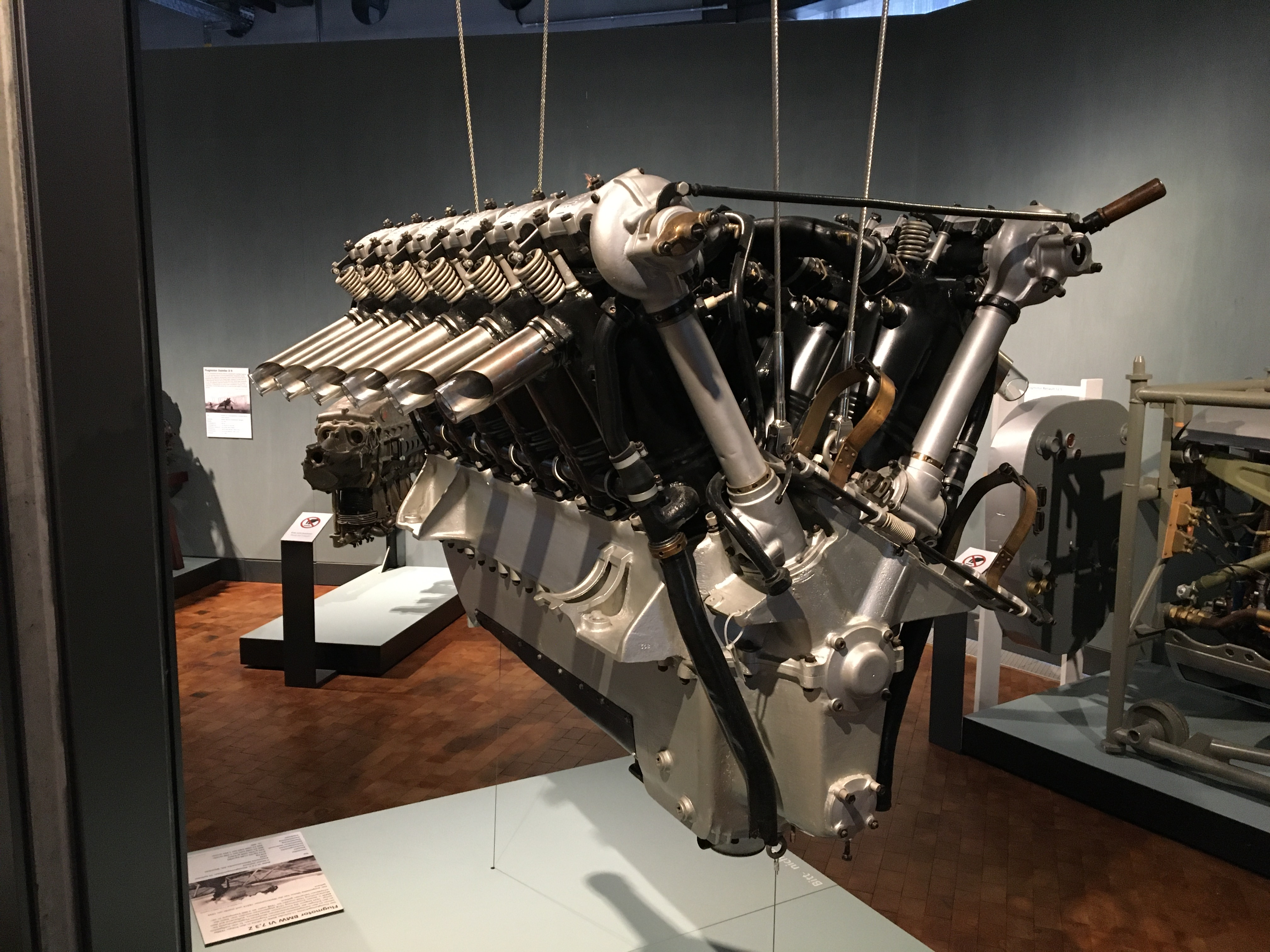
BMW VI at the Technik-Museum Berlin

BMW VI 5.5
Compression ratio 5.5:1, 600–650 PS (592–641 hp) at up to 1600 rpm at sea level
BMW VI 6.0
Compression ratio 6:1, 630–660 PS (621–651 hp) at up to 1650 rpm at sea level, 80 Octane fuel
BMW VI 7.3
Compression ratio 7.3:1 680–750 PS (671–740 hp) at up to 1700 rpm at sea level, 87 Octane fuel
Mikulin M-17
Licence production in the USSR

Kawasaki Ha9
(long designation:- Army Type 98 850hp Liquid Cooled In-line) licence production in Japan by Kawasaki

== Applications ==
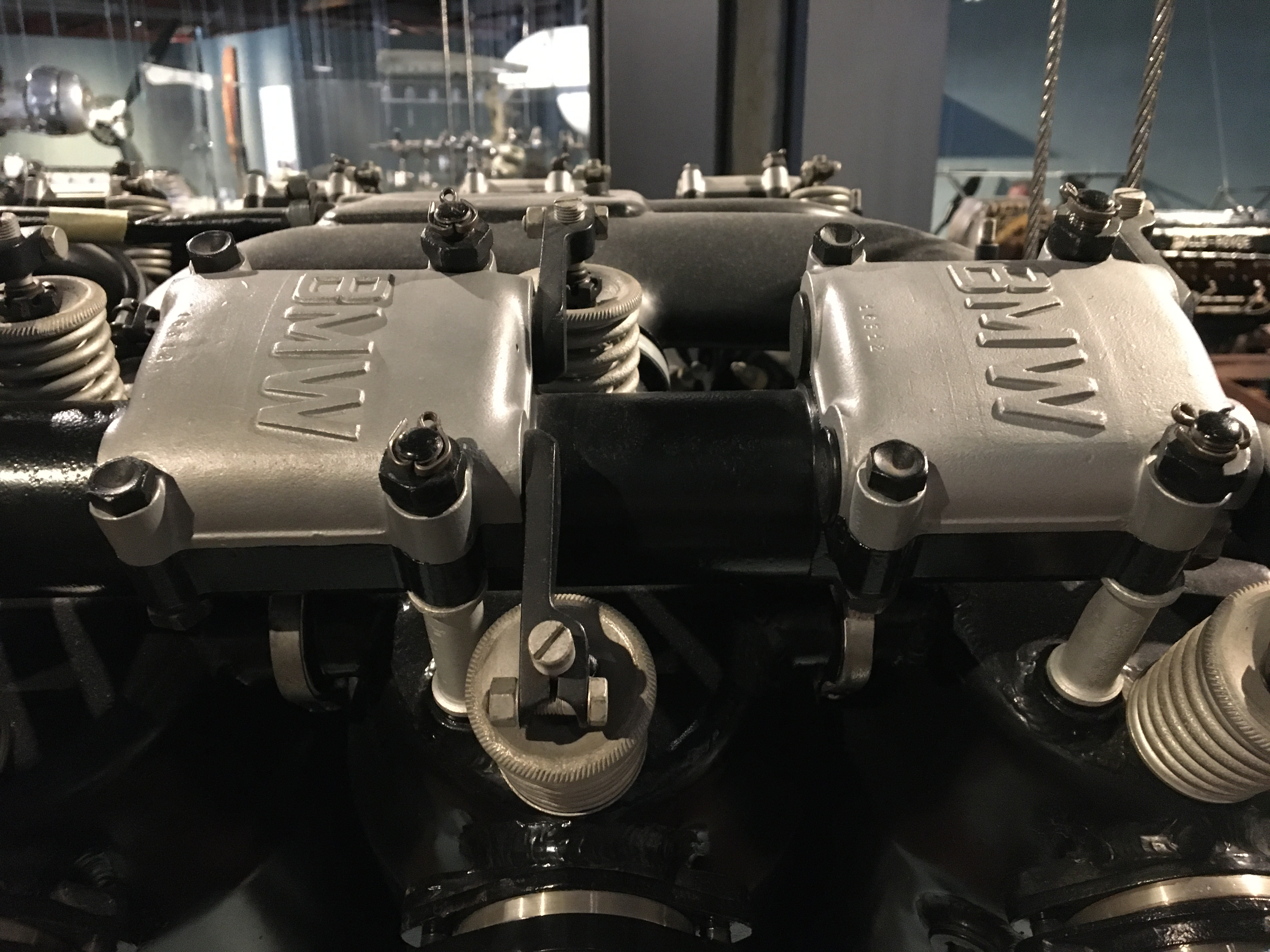
BMW VI head detail

- Albatros L 77v
- Arado Ar 64
- Arado Ar 65
- Arado Ar 68
- Arado SSD I
- Brutus (car)
- Dornier Do 10
- Dornier Do 14
- Dornier Do 17
- Focke-Wulf Fw 42
- Heinkel He 45
- Heinkel He 51
- Heinkel He 59
- Heinkel He 60
- Heinkel He 70
- Heinkel He 111 prototype and civilian versions
- Junkers F.24ko
- Kawasaki Type 92
- Kawasaki Ki-10
- Messerschmitt M.20
- Polikarpov R-5 prototype
- Schienenzeppelin
- Tupolev TB-3

== Specifications (BMW VI 7.3z) ==
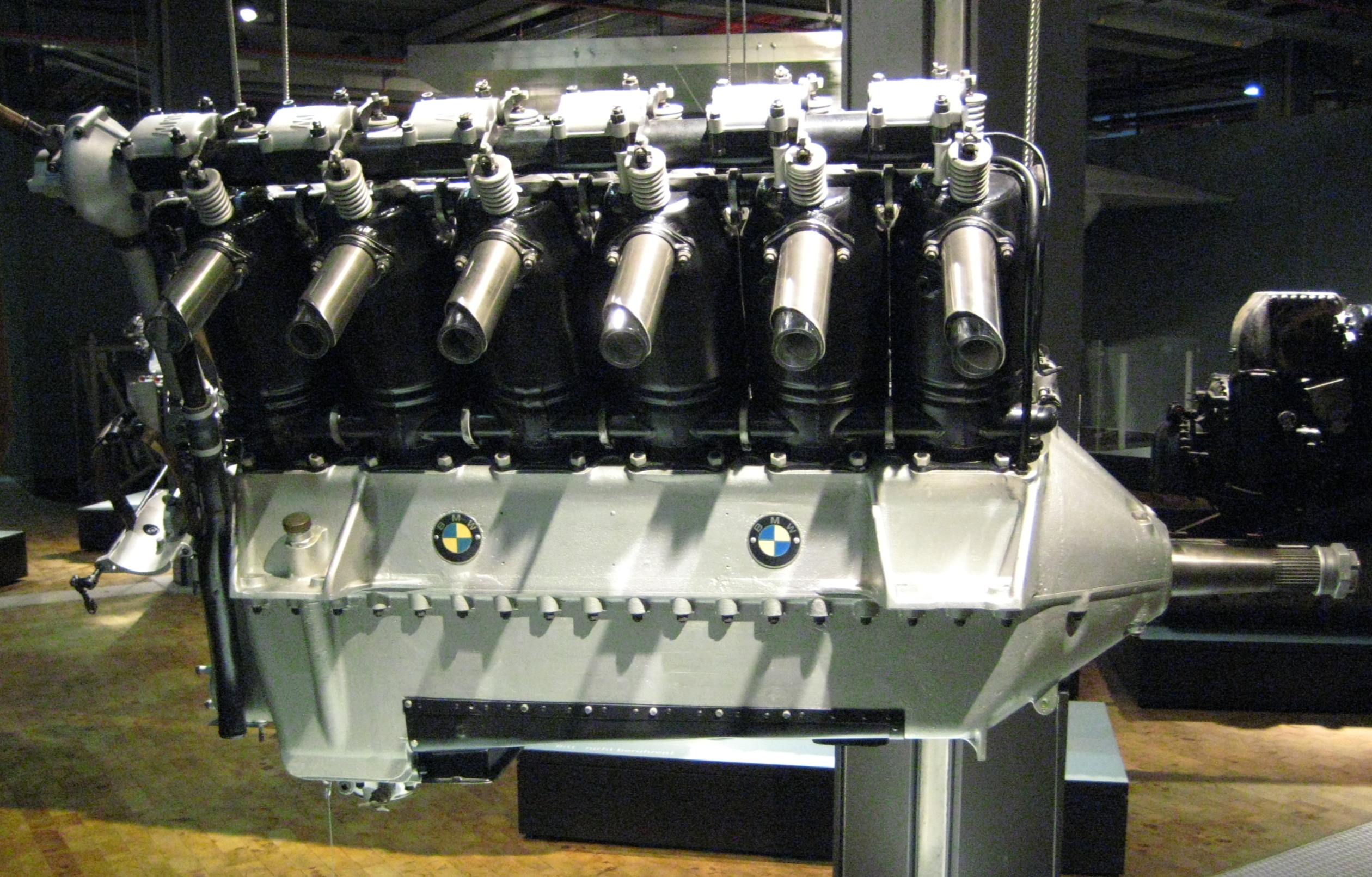
Side view of the BMW VI

Data from Flugzeug-Typenbuch. Handbuch der deutschen Luftfahrt- und Zubehör-Industrie 1944

=== General characteristics ===
- Type: V12, 60° water-cooled piston engine
- Bore: 160 mm (6.30 in)
- Stroke: 190 mm (7.48 in) / 199 mm (7.83 in) (different between right and left cylinder bank due to articulated connecting rods).
- Displacement: 46.9 L (2,862.01 cu in)
- Length: 1,810 mm (71.26 in)
- Width: 859 mm (33.82 in)
- Height: 1,103 mm (43.43 in)
- Dry weight: 510 kg (1,124 lb)

=== Components ===
- Valvetrain: 1 inlet + 1 exhaust valve per cylinder operated by a shaft driven overhead camshaft via rockers
- Fuel system: 2 x Zenith 60 DCL
- Fuel type: min. 87 octane gasoline
- Cooling system: Liquid-cooled
- Reduction gear: none

=== Performance ===
- Power output:

- 750 PS (740 hp; 552 kW) for takeoff at 1,700 rpm (1 minute) at sea level
- 690 PS (681 hp; 507 kW) at 1,650 rpm (5 minutes) at sea level
- 620 PS (612 hp; 456 kW) at 1,590 rpm (30 minutes) at sea level
- 550 PS (542 hp; 405 kW) at 1,530 rpm (max. duration) at sea level

- Specific power: 16 PS/L (0.26 hp/cu in; 11.77 kW/L)
- Compression ratio: 7.3
- Specific fuel consumption:

- 0.23 kg/PSh (0.514 lb/(hp⋅h); 0.313 kg/kWh) at 1,590 rpm
- 0.225 kg/PSh (0.503 lb/(hp⋅h); 0.306 kg/kWh) at 1,530 rpm

- Oil consumption: 0.003–0.01 kg/PSh (0.007–0.022 lb/(hp⋅h); 0.004–0.014 kg/kWh) at 1,530 rpm
- Power-to-weight ratio: 1.47 PS/kg (0.66 hp/lb; 1.08 kW/kg)
- B.M.E.P.: 6.9 atm (7.0 bar; 101 psi)

== See also ==
Related development

- BMW IV
- BMW VII
- Mikulin M-17

Comparable engines

- Liberty L-12

Related lists

- List of aircraft engines
