= Nissan Diesel RN =

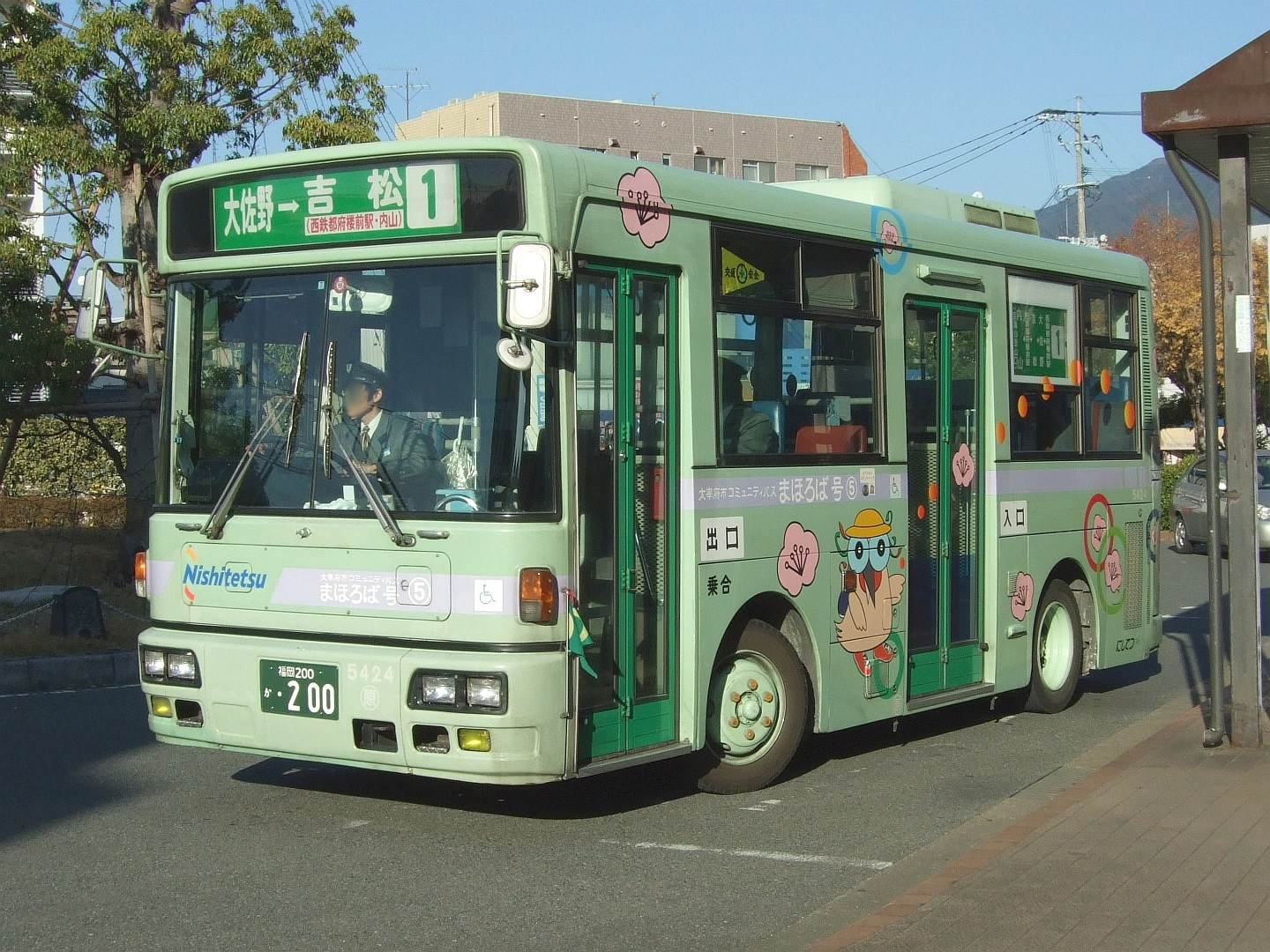

Overview
- Manufacturer: Nissan Diesel
- Production: 1996-2003

Body and chassis
- Class: Minibuses
- Body style: Bus
- Layout: Rear mid-engine, rear-wheel-drive

Powertrain
- Engine: Nissan Diesel FE6E, FE6F
- Transmission: 5-speed manual

Dimensions
- Length: 7m

The Nissan Diesel RN (kana:日産ディーゼル・RN) is a one-step light-duty bus produced by the Japanese manufacturer Nissan Diesel from 1996 until 2003. The range was primarily available as city bus.

== Models ==
- KC-RN210CSN (1996) - FE6E engine (195ps)
- KK-RN252CSN (1999) - FE6F engine (205ps)
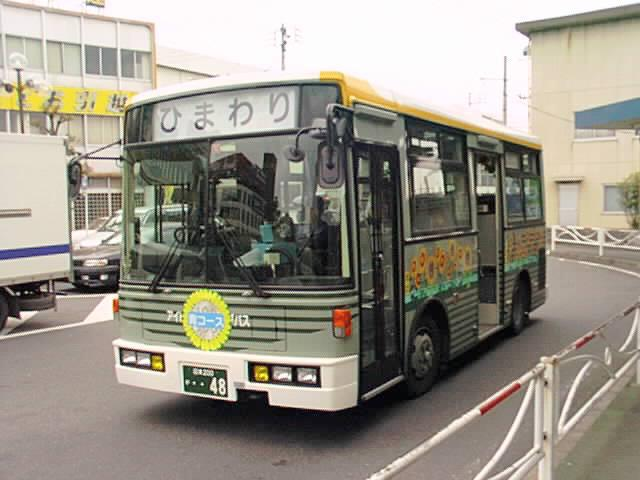
RN KC-RN210CSN
FHI 8E body

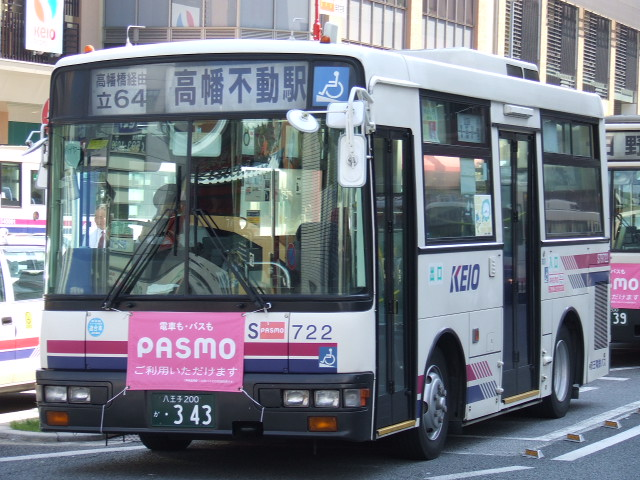
RN KC-RN210CSN
FHI 8E body

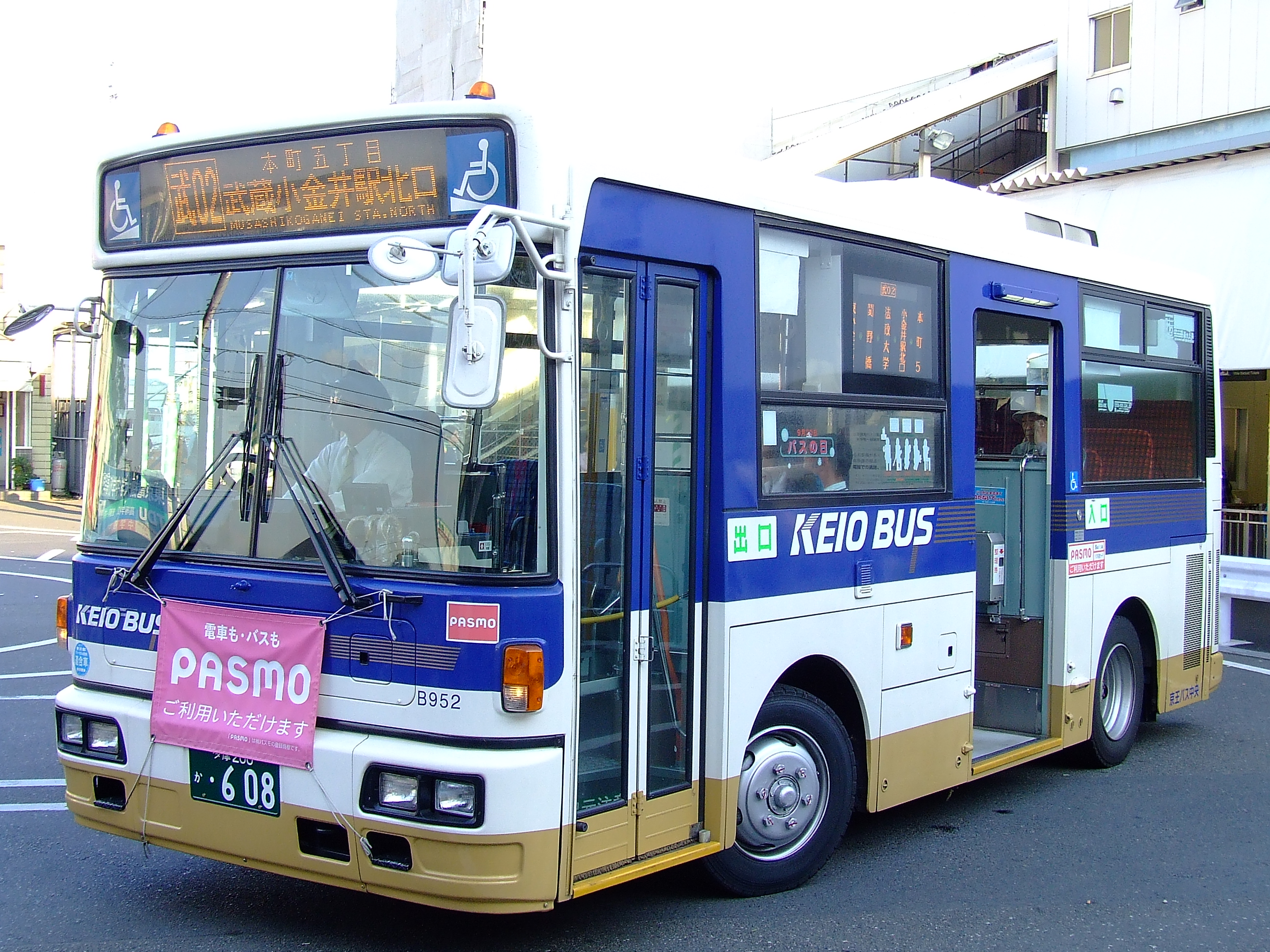
RN KK-RN252CSN
NSK 96MC body

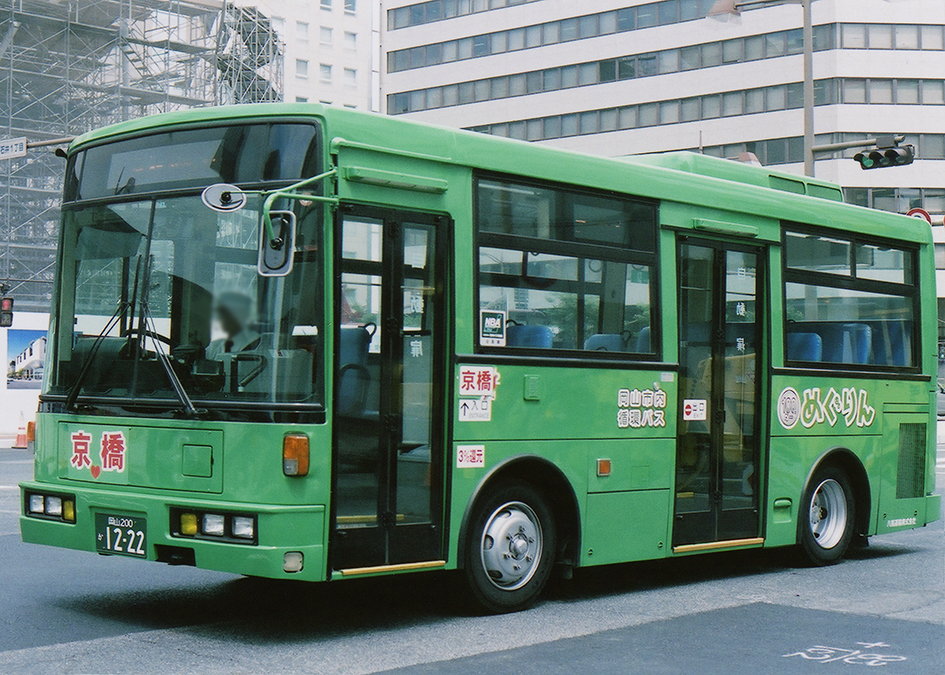
RN KK-RN252CSN
FHI 8E body
