= 1st Flight Training Squadron (JASDF 11th Wing) =

- 第1飛行教育隊
- Country: Japan
- Branch: Japan Air Self-Defense Force
- Part of: 11th Flight Training Wing, Air Training Command
- Garrison/HQ: Shizuhama Air Base

Aircraft flown
- Trainer: Fuji T-7

The 1st Flight Training Squadron (第1飛行教育隊, dai-1-hikō-kyōiku-tai) is a unit of the Japan Air Self-Defense Force. It is also sometimes known as the 11th Flying Training Squadron. It comes under the authority of 11th Flight Training Wing of Air Training Command. It is based at Shizuhama Air Base in Shizuoka Prefecture.
