= Fuji TACOM =

Japanese unmanned aerial vehicle

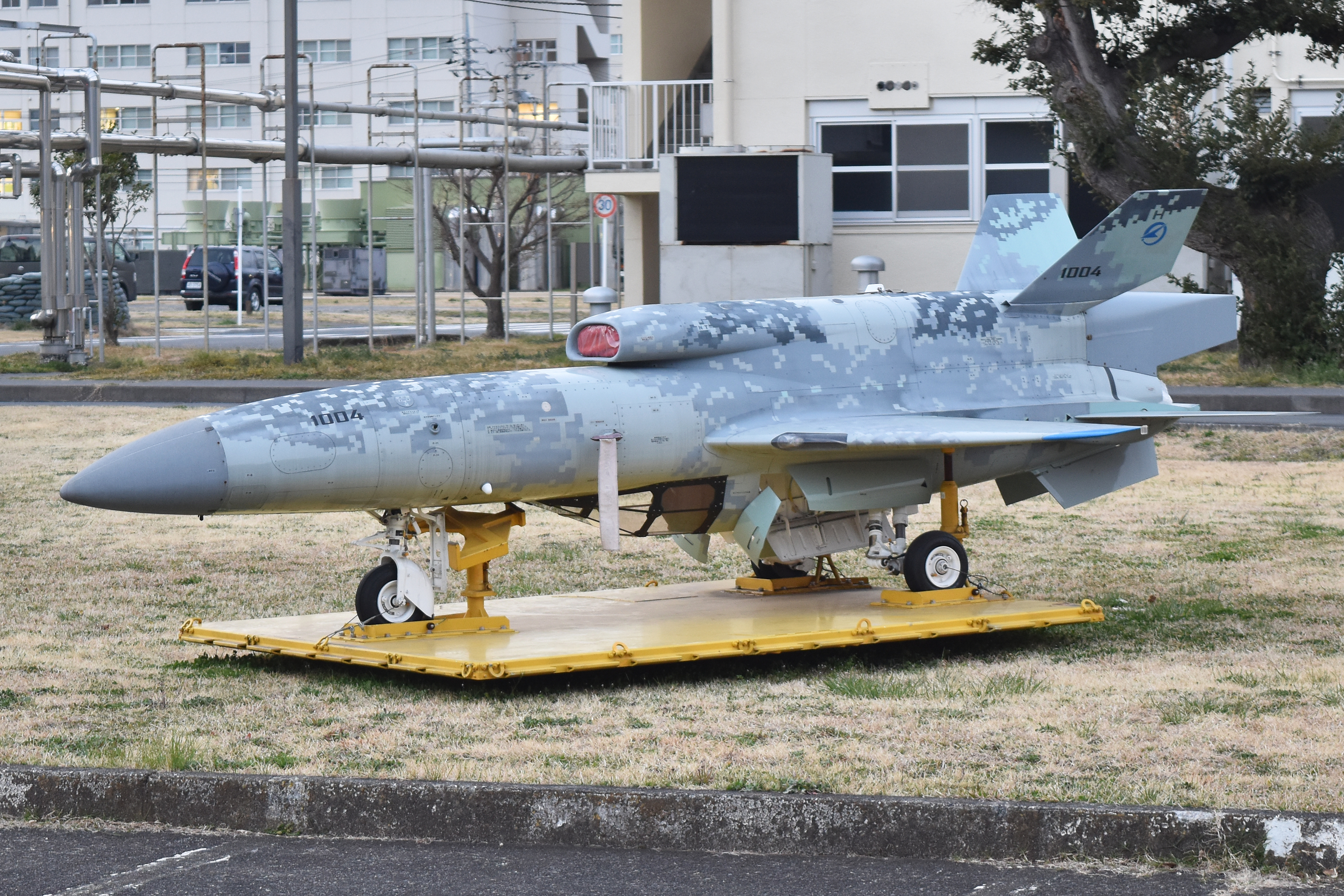

General information
- Type: Air launched unmanned aerial vehicle
- National origin: Japan
- Manufacturer: Subaru Corporation
- Status: Retired
- Primary user: Japan Air Self-Defense Force
- Number built: 6

History
- Manufactured: 1995-1998
- First flight: May 7, 1999
- Retired: 2011

The Fuji TACOM (from Japanese tayouto cogata mujinki 'multi-role small UAV') is an air-launched unmanned aerial vehicle developed by Fuji Heavy Industries (now renamed as Subaru Corporation). In 1995, the TACOM UAV was conceived as a platform to test and evaluate the technologies needed for an air-launched UAV for the Japan Air Self-Defense Force (JASDF). Although it was not designed for any specific mission, some missions that the TACOM could potentially undertake included intelligence, surveillance, target acquisition, reconnaissance, electronic warfare, decoy and aerial target.

== Development ==
Technical Research and Development Institute (TRDI) initiated the TACOM program in 1995 to study the feasibility of an air-launched multirole UAV system based on the JASDF requirements during the time. FHI was awarded the contract that same year. Between 1995 and 1998, FHI designed and manufactured six UAVs, ground control station (GCS), Ground support equipment (GSE), and the conversion kits for the F-4EJ to carry and command the UAV (with assistance from Mitsubishi Heavy Industries). Ground and flight tests were conducted between 1997 and 2001 by the TRDI and JASDF. The ground tests conducted included mechanical and electrical checks, ground vibration, and recovery tests. The flight tests that were conducted focused on the UAV's compatibility with the F-4EJ, captive flight test, and the evaluation of its four key technologies; high-speed stealthy configuration, wing expansion, GPS/ADS hybrid navigation, and autonomous target tracking. On May 7, 1999, the TACOM UAV carried out its first fully autonomous flight. The program ended in 2001 with a total of 22 F-4EJ flights and five independent flights.

In 2004, another UAV program, called the "Unmanned Aerial Research System", was initiated based on experience obtained from the previous project. The program was conducted between 2004 and 2011, with a total of 10.3 billion yen invested into the program. The follow-on program further emphasized the drone's autonomous flight, guidance technology to fly and land autonomously, data transmission, and video technology to capture high resolution images and videos. As a result, the drone has been enlarged and slightly modified in order to conduct the research. One such modification includes being compatible with its new mothership, the F-15J. Captive flight tests were conducted from Gifu Air Field to designated areas off the coast of Japan. The autonomous flight tests were conducted from Iwo Jima.

== Design ==
The TACOM UAV is designed as a high-speed, low observable air launched drone. The drone possesses a foldable, delta wing design, a single air intake above the fuselage, and a single turbofan engine. Due to its small folding wings, the UAV is controlled only by its stabilizers and features ventral fins for lateral and directional stability. Some designs to reduce its radar cross section (RCS) include a curve intake S-duct and its small number of edge orientation. The dimensions of the drone were designed so that it can be carried by an F-4EJ. Avionics include a Mission Management Computer (MMC) and IR sensor mounted in the forward section of the fuselage, and two data link antennas located in the nose and rear (above the engine) of the drone. The drone features airbags and a parachute to decelerate and ensure a safe landing.

Following its second program, the drone has been enlarged and modified, but overall retains much of its general characteristics. Some modifications include the addition of a traffic collision avoidance system, an Air Traffic Control transponder, camera and senors housed underneath the fuselage, and the compatibility with an F-15J.

== Specification ==
Data from

General characteristics

- Length: 4.7 m (15 ft 5 in) original

5.2 m (17 ft) modified

- Wingspan: 2.5 m (8 ft 2 in)
- Height: 1.6 m (5 ft 3 in)
- Empty weight: 619 kg (1,365 lb) original

700 kg (1,543 lb) modified

- Powerplant: 1 × Teledyne CAE 382-10J turbofan engine

Performance
