= Fuji T-5 =

Japanese military trainer aircraft

T-5
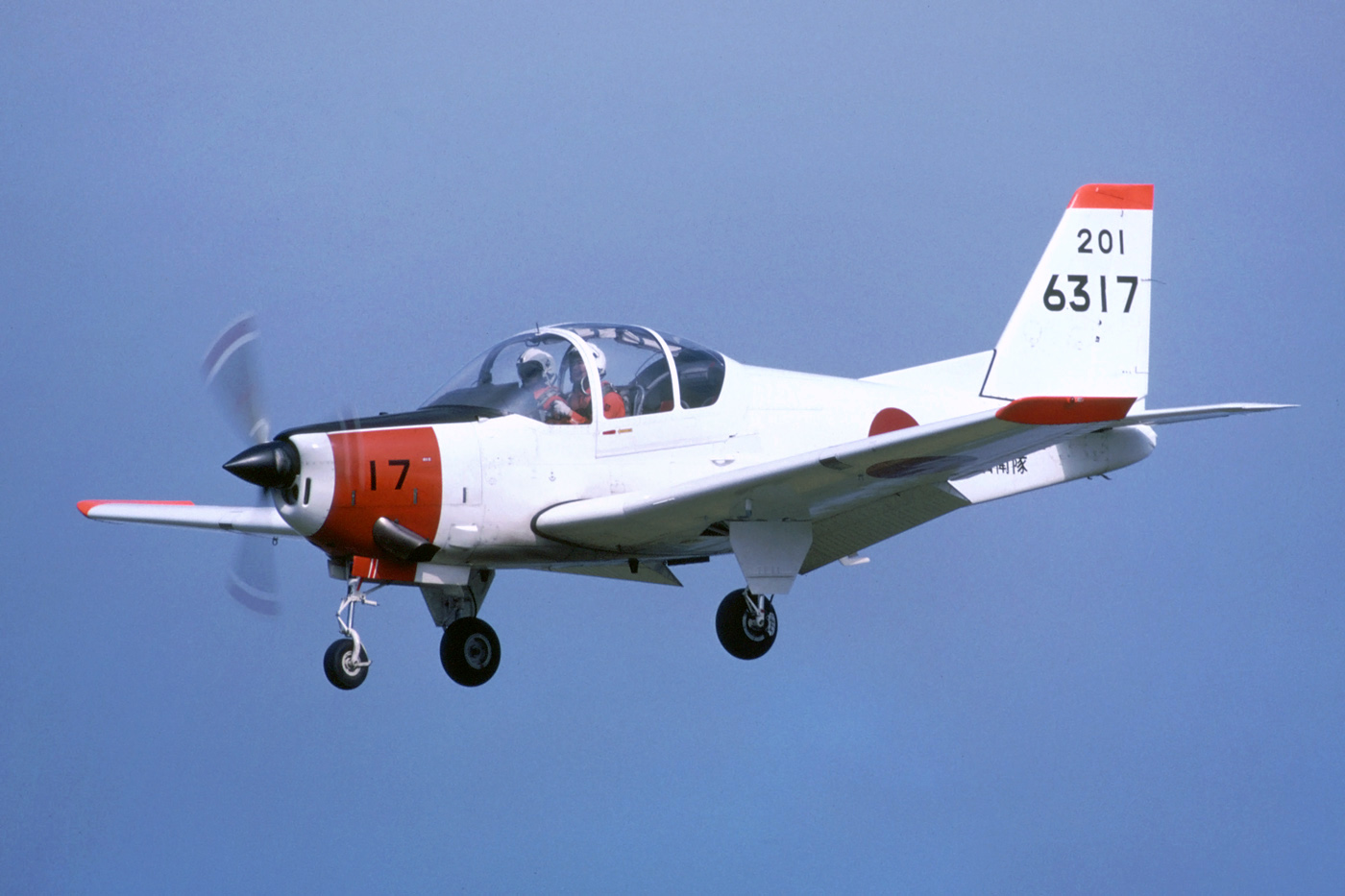

General information
- Type: Basic trainer
- Manufacturer: Fuji Heavy Industries
- Primary user: Japan Maritime Self-Defense Force

History
- Introduction date: 1988
- First flight: 28 June 1984
- Developed from: Fuji KM-2

The Fuji T-5 or KM-2Kai is a Japanese turboprop-driven primary trainer aircraft, which is a development of the earlier Fuji KM-2. The student and the instructor sit side-by-side.

== Design and development ==
The Fuji T-5 was developed by Fuji Heavy Industries as a replacement for the piston-engined Fuji KM-2 (itself a development of the Beechcraft T-34 Mentor) as a primary trainer for the Japan Maritime Self-Defense Force. Fuji refitted a KM-2 with an Allison Model 250 turboprop engine in place of the original Lycoming piston engine, the resulting KM-2D first flying on 28 June 1984 and being certified on 14 February 1985. The KM-2Kai is a further development of the KM-2D, with a modernised cockpit with side-by-side seating and a sliding canopy replacing the original KM-2's car type side doors (which were retained by the KM-2D).

The T-5 is an all-metal low-wing cantilever monoplane powered by an Allison 250-B17D turboprop with a three-bladed constant speed propeller. It has a retractable tricycle landing gear with the main gear retracting inwards and nose gear rearwards. The T-5 has an enclosed cabin with a sliding canopy and two side-by-side seats, and dual controls, in the aerobatic version and four seats in pairs in the utility version.

== Operational history ==
The KM-2Kai was ordered by the JMSDF as the T-5 in March 1987, with deliveries of the KM2-Kai to the Japanese Self Defence Forces beginning in 1988, with a total of 40 being built. The T-5 serves with the 201 Air Training Squadron at Ozuki Air Field. The original KM-2 is no longer in service.

== Operators ==
Japan

- Japan Maritime Self-Defense Force

== Specifications (T-5) ==
Data from Jane's Aircraft Recognition Guide

General characteristics

- Crew: 2
- Length: 8.4 m (27 ft 7 in)
- Wingspan: 10 m (32 ft 10 in)
- Height: 2.9 m (9 ft 6 in)
- Wing area: 16.5 m^{2} (178 sq ft)
- Airfoil: root: NACA 23016.5; tip: NACA 23012
- Empty weight: 1,082 kg (2,385 lb)
- Max takeoff weight: 1,805 kg (3,979 lb)
- Powerplant: 1 × Allison Model 250-B17D turboprop, 261 kW (350 hp)
- Propellers: 3-bladed constant-speed propeller

Performance

- Maximum speed: 357 km/h (222 mph, 193 kn) at 2,440 m (8,005 ft)
- Cruise speed: 287 km/h (178 mph, 155 kn)
- Stall speed: 104 km/h (65 mph, 56 kn)
- Never exceed speed: 413 km/h (257 mph, 223 kn)
- Range: 945 km (587 mi, 510 nmi)
- Service ceiling: 7,620 m (25,000 ft)
- Rate of climb: 8.6 m/s (1,690 ft/min)

== See also ==
Related development

- Beech T-34
- Fuji KM-2
- Fuji T-3
- Fuji T-7
