= Fuji FA-200 Aero Subaru =

Single-engine piston-powered airplane

FA-200 Aero Subaru
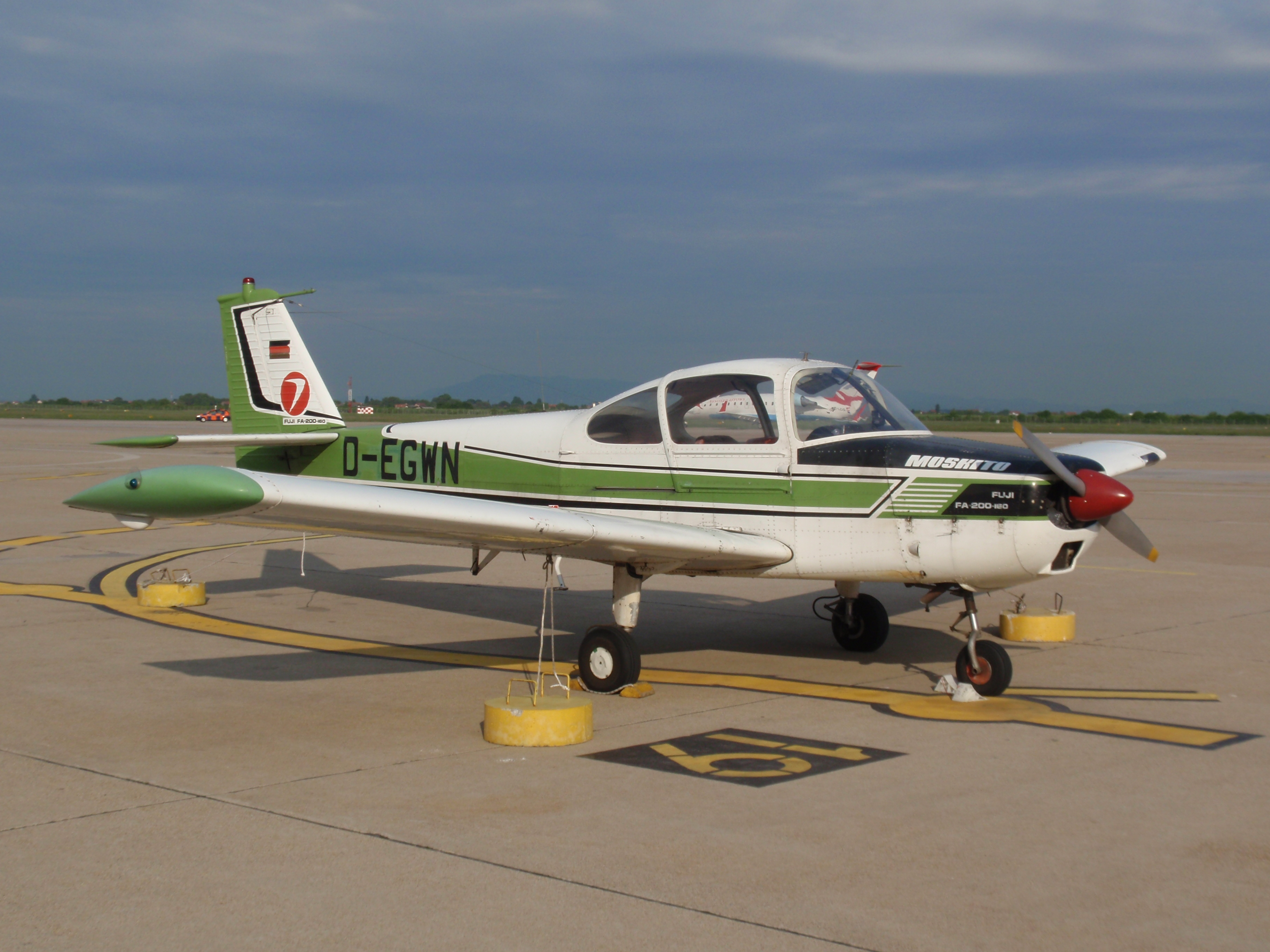
- Fuji FA-200-160

General information
- Type: Civil light aircraft
- Manufacturer: Fuji
- Number built: 275

History
- Manufactured: 1968–1986
- Introduction date: 1968
- First flight: 12 August 1965

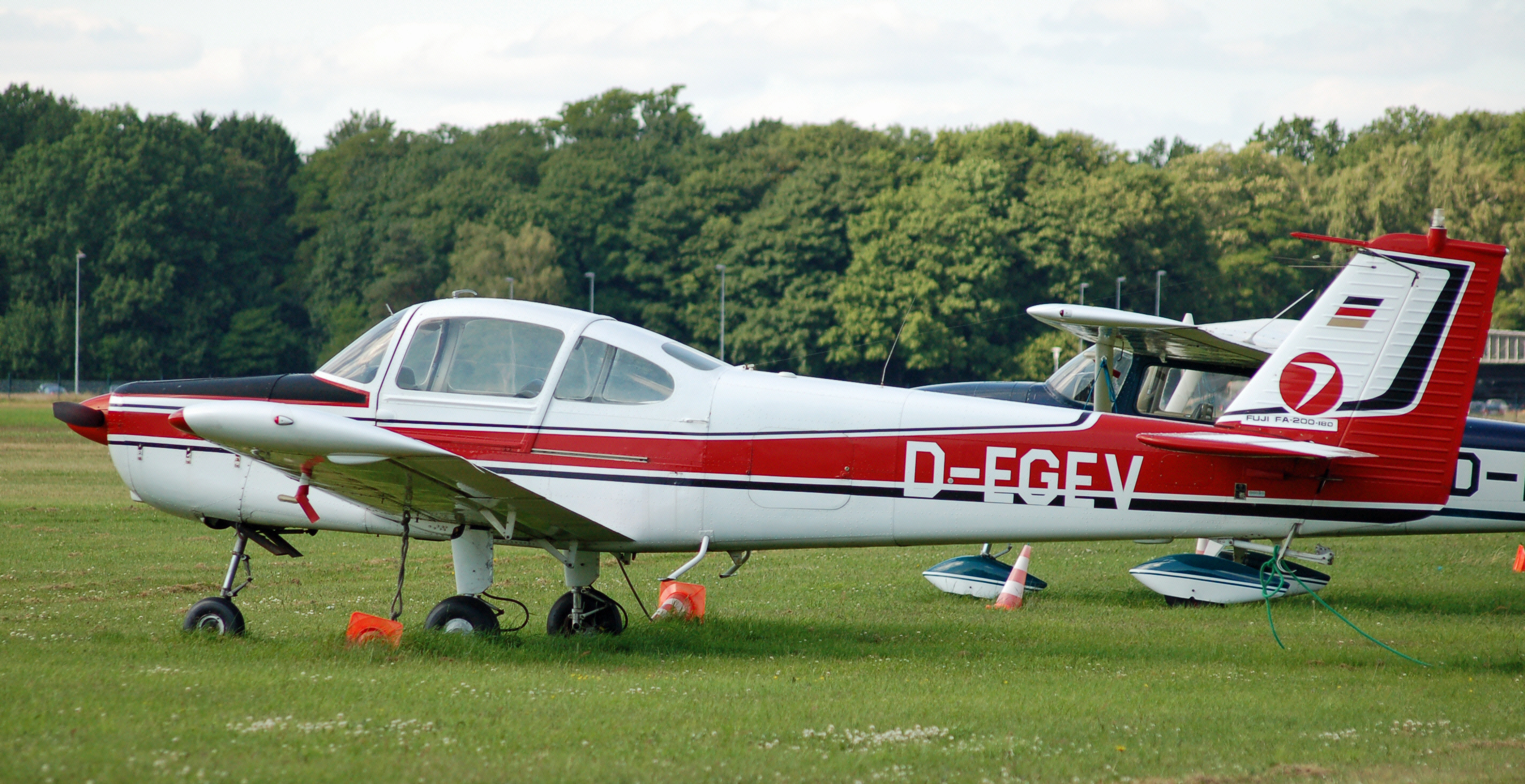
Fuji FA-200-180

The Fuji FA-200 Aero Subaru is a single-engine piston-powered monoplane built by Fuji Heavy Industries of Japan.

== Design and development ==
Fuji Heavy Industries began development of a four-seat light aeroplane, the Fuji FA-200 Aero Subaru in 1964, the first prototype flying on 12 August 1965. It is a low-wing all-metal aircraft, fitted with a fixed undercarriage. It was first certified in Japan on 6 July 1966, with certification in the United States occurring on 26 September 1967.

Production started in March 1968, continuing until 1986, with a total of 275 built.

== Variants ==
F-200-II
Prototype with a 120 kW (160 hp) Lycoming O-320 engine
FA-200-160
Initial version, powered by 120 kW Lycoming O-320 engine and fixed-pitch propeller.
FA-200-180
More powerful development - 130 kW (180 hp) Lycoming IO-360 engine and constant speed propeller.
FA-200-180AO
Powered by 130 kW Lycoming O-360-A5AD engine and fitted with fixed-pitch propeller.
FA-203-S
Experimental short takeoff and landing (STOL) version, developed by Japan's National Aerospace Laboratory fitted with boundary layer control system.
F-201
Proposed three-seat variant, not built.
F-202
Proposed two-seat aerobatic variant, not built.
F-203
Proposed STOL variant.
F-204
Proposed crop spraying variant, not built.

== Accidents and incidents ==
- On May 13, 2017, a Fuji FM 200-160 with tail number E7-AAS, crashed in Jasenica, near Mostar in Bosnia and Herzegovina, killing all 5 on board. Among them were 3 children.

== Specifications (FA-200-180) ==
Fuji FA-200

Data from Jane's All the World's Aircraft, 1976-1977

General characteristics

- Crew: 1/2
- Capacity: 2/3 passengers
- Length: 8.17 m (26 ft 10 in)
- Wingspan: 9.42 m (30 ft 11 in)
- Height: 2.59 m (8 ft 6 in)
- Wing area: 14.0 m^{2} (151 sq ft)
- Aspect ratio: 6.34:1
- Empty weight: 650 kg (1,433 lb)
- Max takeoff weight: 1,150 kg (2,535 lb)
- Fuel capacity: 204.5 L (54.0 US gal; 45.0 imp gal)
- Powerplant: 1 × Lycoming IO-360B1B four cylinder air-cooled horizontally-opposed piston engine, 130 kW (180 hp)
- Propellers: 2-bladed McCauley B2D34C53/74E-0 metal constant-speed propeller, 1.88 m (6 ft 2 in) diameter

Performance

- Maximum speed: 233 km/h (145 mph, 126 kn)
- Cruise speed: 167 km/h (104 mph, 90 kn) 55% power at 1,525 m (5,000 ft)
- Stall speed: 97 km/h (60 mph, 52 kn) flaps down
- Range: 1,343 km (834 mi, 725 nmi) ; 55% power at 2,300 m (7,500 ft) with no reserve (max fuel)
- Service ceiling: 4,200 m (13,700 ft)
- Rate of climb: 3.9 m/s (760 ft/min) at sea level

== See also ==
Aircraft of comparable role, configuration, and era

- Meyers 200
- Piaggio P.149
- Ryan Navion
