= Tobu 6050 series =

Electric multiple unit of Tobu Railway, Yagan Railway and Aizu Railway

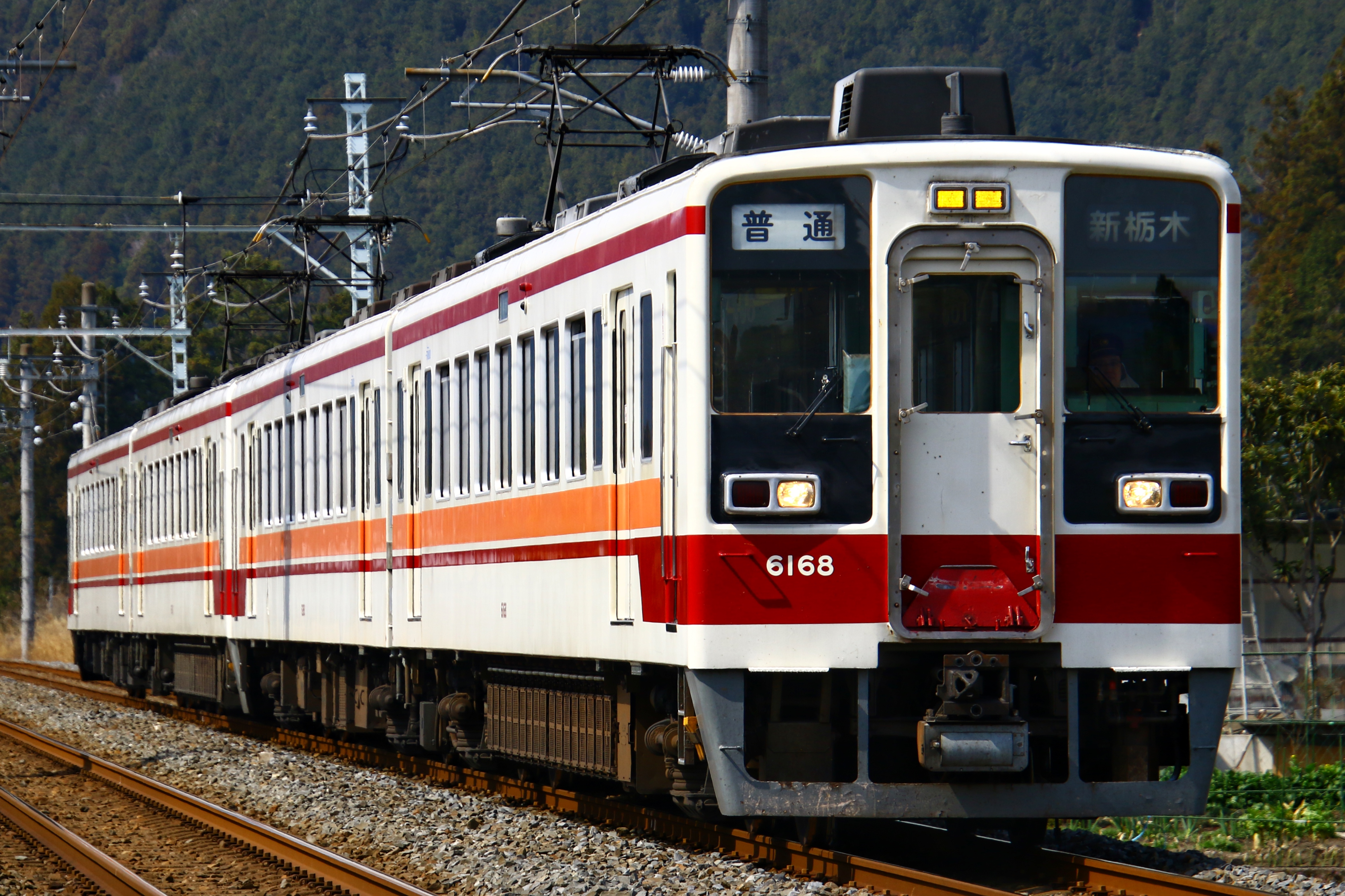
- Set 6168, March 2021
- In service: 1985–present
- Manufacturers: Alna Kōki, Fuji Heavy Industries, Tokyu Car Corporation
- Constructed: 1985–1990
- Entered service: 15 November 1985
- Number built: 66 vehicles (33 sets)
- Number in service: 4 vehicles (2 sets)
- Formation: 2 cars per trainset
- Operators: Yagan Railway Former operators: Tobu Railway; Aizu Railway
- Depot: Shin-Tochigi
- Lines served: Aizu Kinugawa Line Former: Tobu Skytree Line; Tobu Nikko Line; Tobu Kinugawa Line

Specifications
- Car body construction: Steel
- Car length: 20 m (65 ft 7 in)
- Doors: Two pairs per side
- Maximum speed: 110 km/h (68 mph)
- Traction system: Resistor control
- Electric system: 1,500 V DC
- Current collection: Overhead wire
- Track gauge: 1,067 mm (3 ft 6 in)

The Tobu 6050 series (東武6050系, Tōbu 6050-kei) is an electric multiple unit (EMU) train type operated on the Tobu Nikko Line and the Aizu Line in Japan since 1985. These trains were operated by Tobu Railway and the connecting companies Aizu Railway and Yagan Railway, and provide "Local" and "Express/Section-Express" services. "Rapid/Section Rapid" services operated until April 2017. On 12 March 2022, Tobu Railway and Aizu Railway withdrew their fleets of 6050 series and 6050-100 series sets from service, respectively. Yagan Railway still has two formations of 6050-100 series, which operate on the Aizu-Kinugawa Line and the Tobu Kinugawa Line.

== Design ==
In 1985, the 6050 series design was created by rebuilding former 6000 series EMUs (dating from 1964) with new steel bodies. Before through-running operations began on 9 October 1986, the trains were required to satisfy fire resistance regulations due to the long tunnel on the Aizu Kinugawa Line.

=== Livery ===
Trains are painted in "jasmine white" with "sunny coral orange" and "purple ruby" lining.

== Formations ==
The fleet of 33 two-car sets is formed as shown below.

Designation	Mc	Tc
Numbering	6150	6250

- The Mc cars are each fitted with one scissors-type pantograph. Sets 6153-6156 and 6173 have two pantographs.
- Yagan Railway set (6050-100 series) cars are numbered 6110x and 6210x.
- The Tc cars are equipped with a toilet.

=== Withdrawing formations ===
- The sole Aizu Railway set (6050-200 series) cars are numbered 61201 and 62201.

== Interior ==
Passenger accommodation consists of fixed 4-seat bays with a seat pitch of 1,525 mm (60.0 in).

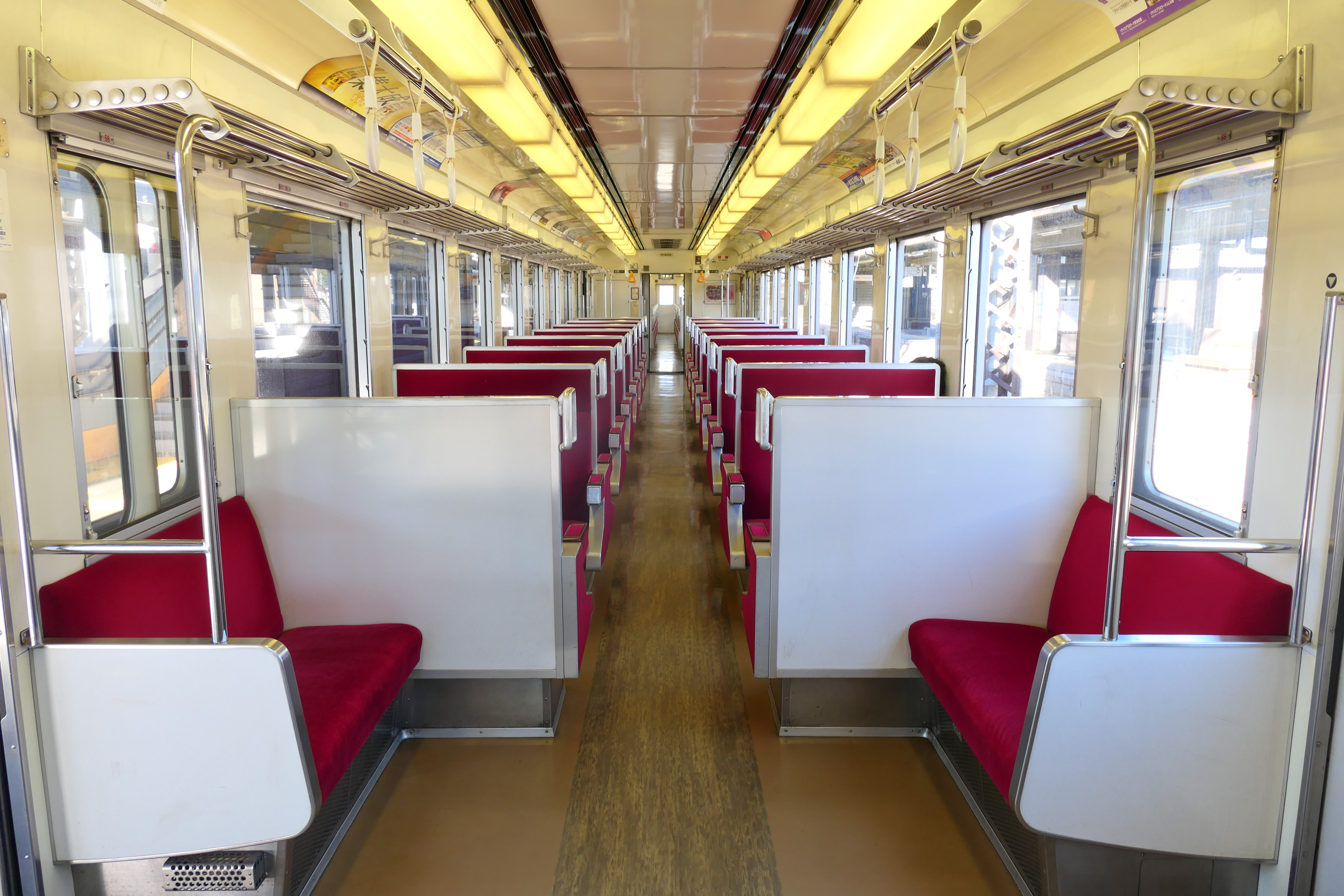
Overall interior view

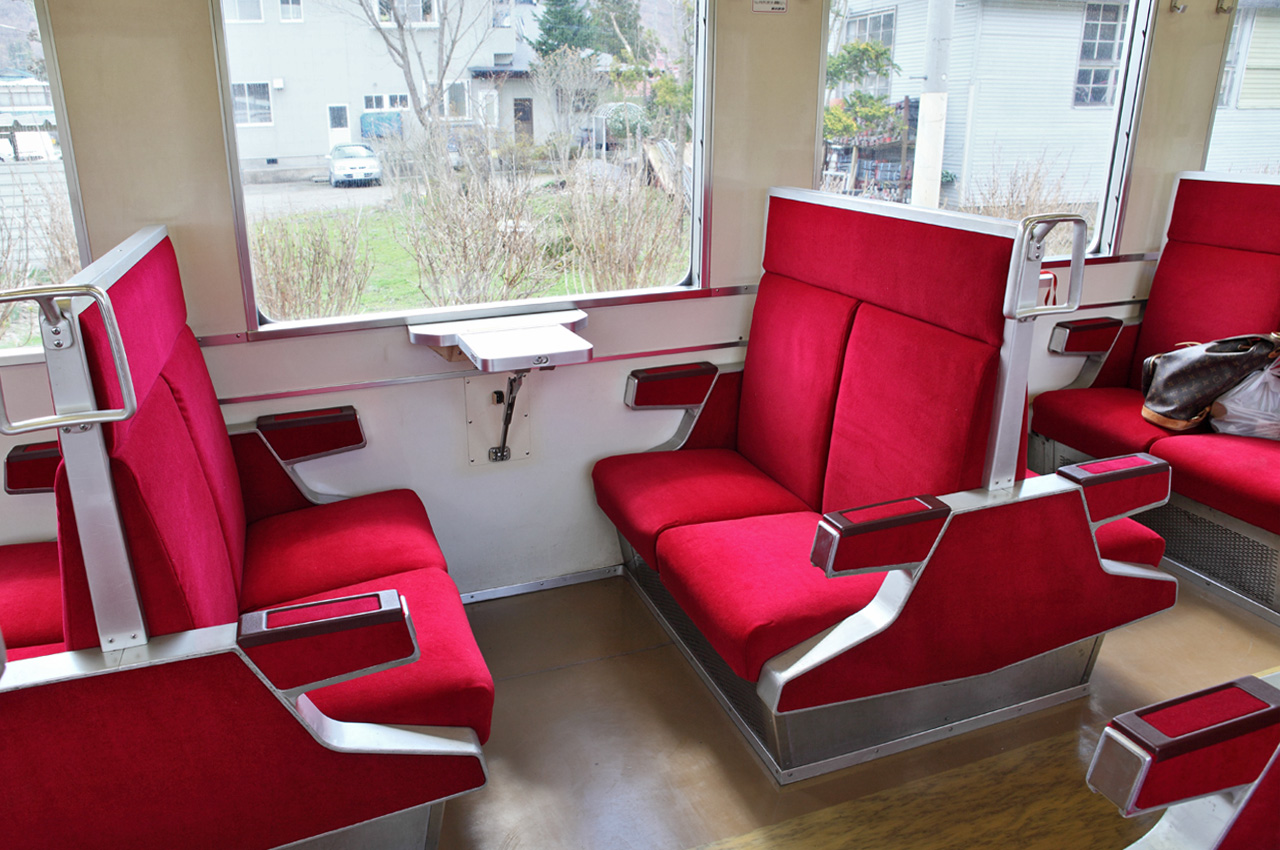
Seating bay

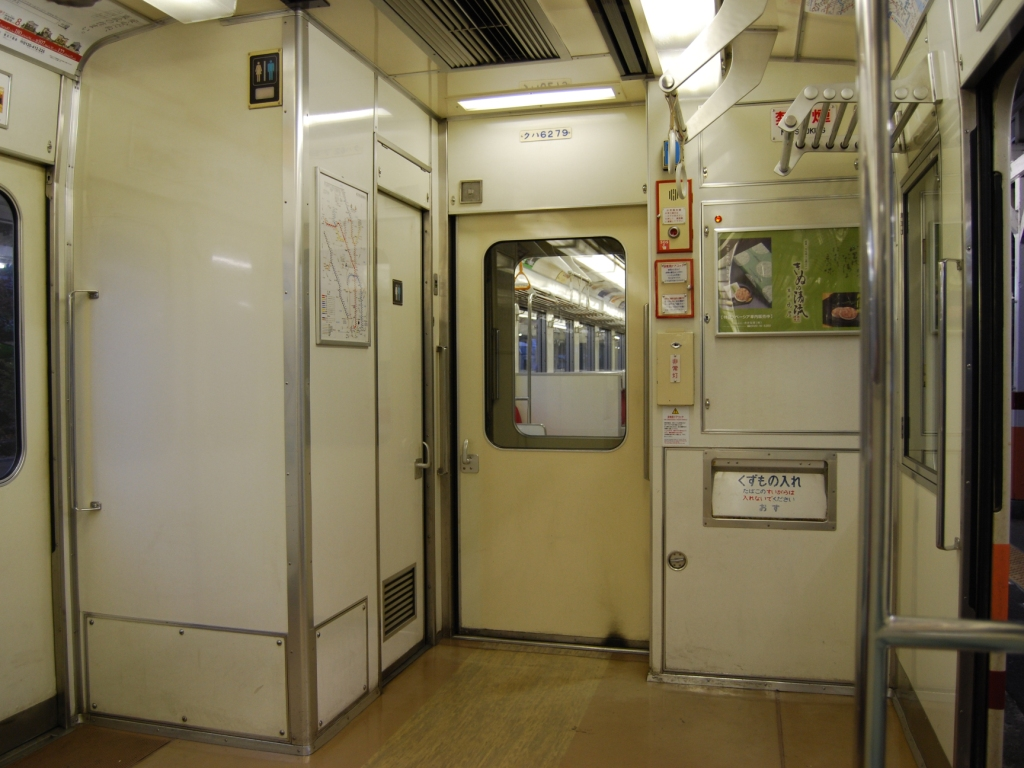
Toilet in KuHa 6279

== History ==
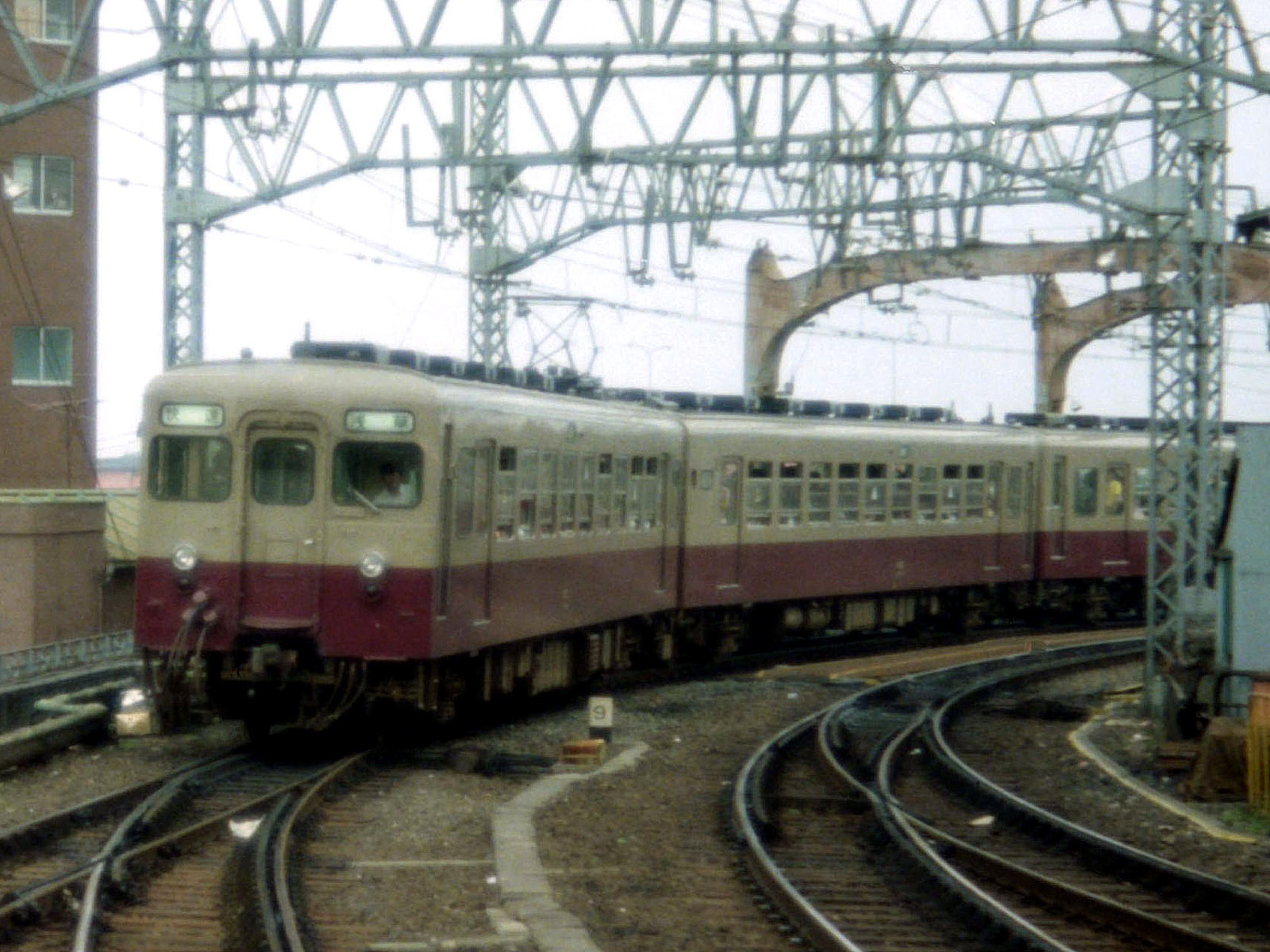
Original 6000 series EMU, August 1980

All 44 former 6000 series cars were rebuilt between September 1985 and October 1986 as sets 6151 to 6172, with the first sets entering service on 15 November 1985.

With the popularity of the new trains, an additional eight new 2-car sets were built, including one set for the Yagan Railway, enabling all "Rapid" services between Asakusa and Shimo-Imaichi to be increased to 6-car formations from the 9 August 1988 timetable revision.

A further two newly built sets were added to the Yagan Railway fleet coinciding with the start of Aizu Kinugawa Line services. One additional new set was delivered to the Aizu Railway in 1990.

Two 6050 series sets, 6177 and 6178, were rebuilt in September 2012 at J-TREC in Yokohama to become 634 series sets for use on Skytree Train services from 27 October 2012.

On 12 March 2022, Tobu Railway and Aizu Railway updated their timetables, at which time the 6050 series and 6050-200 series that Tobu Railway and Aizu Railway held (respectively) were withdrawn from operation and dismantled at Kita-Tatebayashi Niatsukaisho. Now, only two 6050 series sets remain, operated by Yagan Railway.
