= Fuji LM-1 Nikko =

Japanese military utility aircraft

LM-1 Nikko
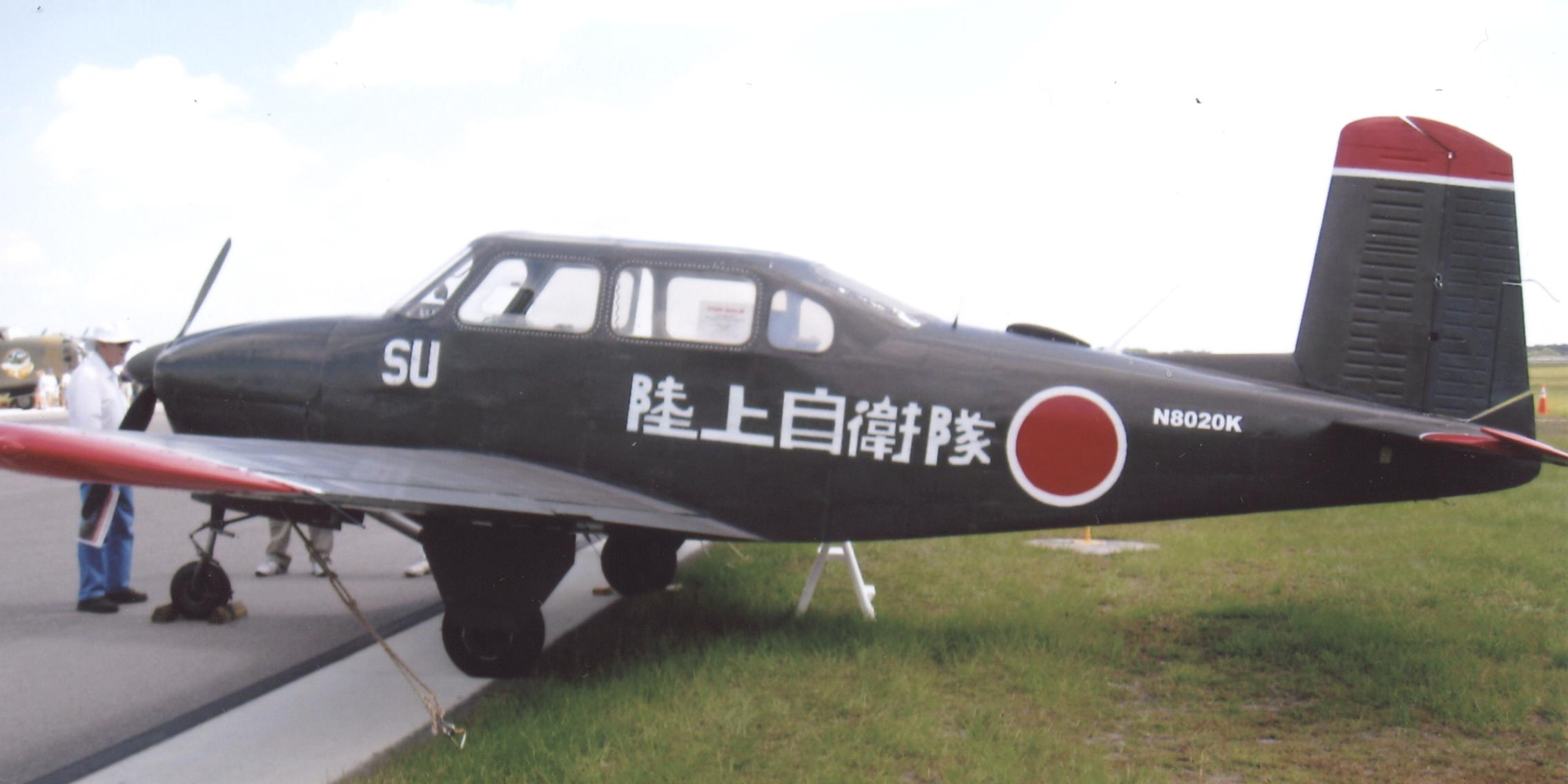
- Airworthy Fuji LM-1 Nikko of 1955 in JGSDF markings at Lakeland, Florida, in April 2009

General information
- Type: military communications aircraft
- National origin: Japan
- Manufacturer: Fuji Heavy Industries
- Status: Retired
- Primary user: Japanese Air Self-Defense Force
- Number built: 27

History
- Introduction date: 1955
- First flight: 6 June 1955
- Developed from: Beech T-34 Mentor
- Variants: Fuji KM-2; RTAF-2

The Fuji LM-1 Nikko is a Japanese light communications aircraft of the 1950s.

== Development ==
Fuji Heavy Industries built 176 Beech T-34 Mentor two-seat training aircraft under licence in the early 1950s. Fuji then redesigned the basic Mentor as a four-seat communications aircraft under the designation LM-1. A new lengthened centre fuselage was added to the Mentor's wing, undercarriage, and tail assembly. 27 LM-1s were produced during 1955–1956.

== Operational history ==
The LM-1s were delivered to the Japanese Air Self-Defense Force (JASDF) and were used for communications and general duties. After withdrawal from operation, several LM-1s were sold on the U.S. civil market and are flown by civil pilots as "warbirds".

== Variants ==
LM-1
four-seat communications aircraft with 225 h.p. (168 kW) Continental engine (27 built)

LM-2
higher-powered version with 340 h.p. (254 kW) Lycoming engine (2 built)

RTAF-2
a variant developed in Thailand by Thai Aviation Industry.

LM-11 Supernikko
A proposed more powerful version of the LM-1 powered by a 240 hp (180 kW) Lycoming GSO-480-B1A6 engine; became the LM-2.

== Specifications (LM-1) ==
Data from Green, 1956, p. 86

General characteristics

- Crew: 1
- Capacity: 3 passengers
- Length: 25 ft 11 in (7.90 m)
- Wingspan: 32 ft 9 in (9.98 m)
- Height: 9 ft 7 in (3.63 m)
- Wing area: 177.6 sq ft (16.50 m^{2})
- Empty weight: 2,234 lb (1,013 kg)
- Gross weight: 3,375 lb (1,531 kg)
- Powerplant: 1 × Continental O-470 6-cylinder horizontally opposed air-cooled , 225 hp (168 kW)

Performance

- Maximum speed: 185 mph (298 km/h, 161 kn)
- Cruise speed: 157 mph (253 km/h, 136 kn)
- Service ceiling: 17,388 ft (5,300 m)
