= Fuji T-3 =

Japanese military trainer aircraft

T-3
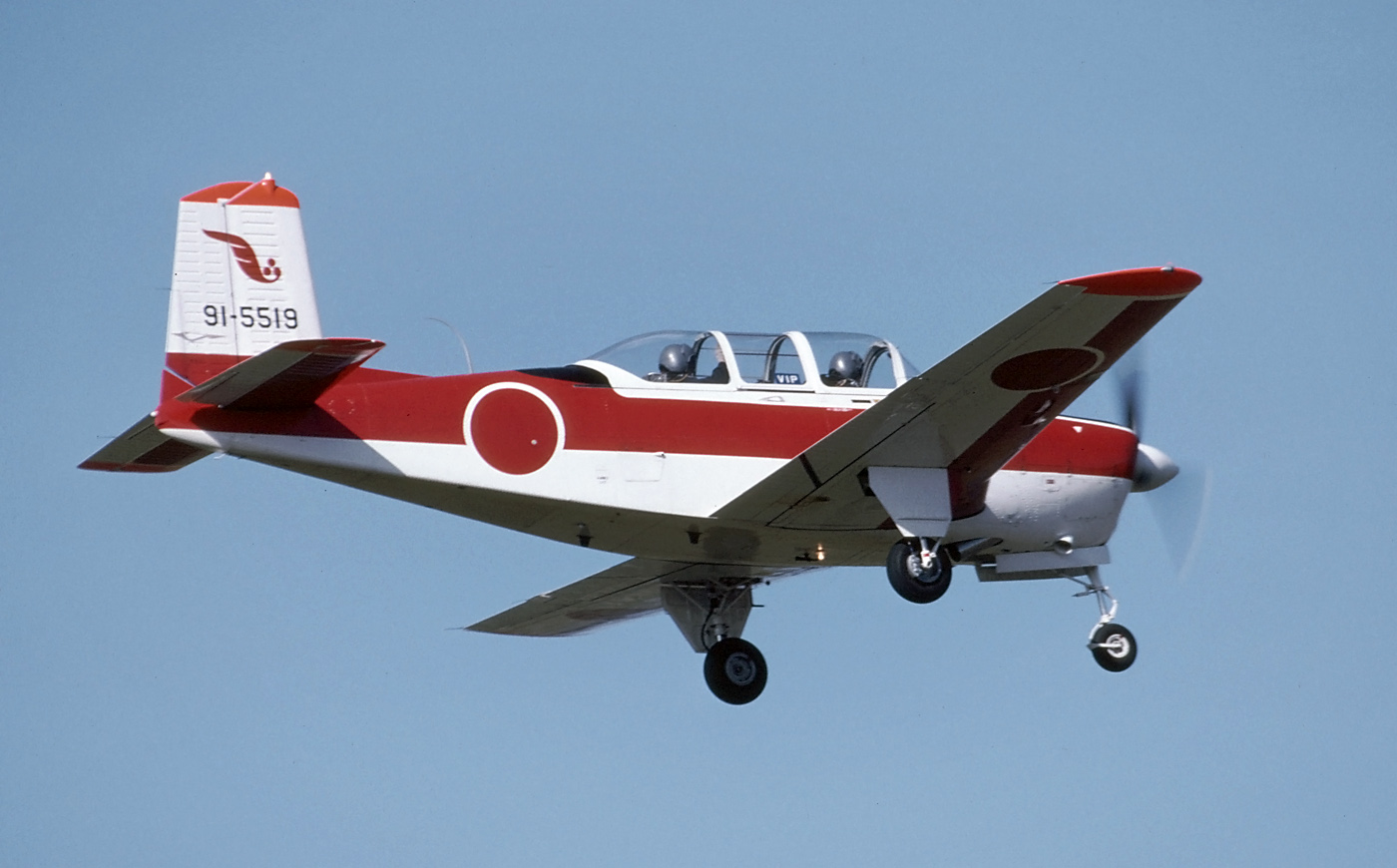
- Fuji T-3

General information
- Type: Primary trainer
- Manufacturer: Fuji Heavy Industries
- Primary user: Japan Air Self Defense Force
- Number built: 50

History
- Manufactured: 1978-1982
- First flight: 1978
- Retired: Retired from military service in 2007
- Developed from: Fuji KM-2
- Developed into: Fuji T-7

The Fuji T-3 is a primary military trainer aircraft used by the Japan Air Self Defense Force, manufactured by Fuji Heavy Industries. Its first flight was in 1978. In the course of its service life, 50 units were produced. It has been replaced by the Fuji T-7.

== Development ==
The KM-2B was a further development of the Fuji KM-2 (itself a four-seat development of the T-34 Mentor with a more powerful engine) for use as a primary trainer for the Japan Air Self-Defense Force (JASDF). It combined the structure and engine of the KM-2 with the tandem cockpit of the T-34 Mentor. Its first flight was on 17 January 1978. Fifty were purchased by the JASDF as the Fuji T-3, and production continued until 1982.

== Operational history ==
The Fuji T-3 served with the 11 and 12 Hiko-Kyoikudan of the JASDF. The T-3 was retired in 2007 and replaced by the Fuji T-7, a turboprop variant of the T-3, with a 400 shp (300 kW) Allison 250 engine.

== Operators ==
Japan
Japan Air Self-Defense Force

== Specifications (T-3) ==
Data from Jane's Aircraft Recognition Guide, Jane's All the World's Aircraft, 1976-1977

General characteristics

- Crew: 2
- Length: 8.04 m (26 ft 5 in)
- Wingspan: 10 m (32 ft 10 in)
- Height: 3.02 m (9 ft 11 in)
- Wing area: 16.5 m^{2} (178 sq ft)
- Airfoil: root: NACA 23016.5; tip: NACA 23012
- Empty weight: 1,120 kg (2,469 lb)
- Max takeoff weight: 1,510 kg (3,329 lb)
- Powerplant: 1 × Lycoming IGSO-480 6-cylinder horizontally opposed air-cooled piston engine, 254 kW (341 hp)
- Propellers: 3-bladed constant-speed propeller

Performance

- Maximum speed: 377 km/h (234 mph, 204 kn) at 4,875 m (15,994 ft)
- Cruise speed: 254 km/h (158 mph, 137 kn) at 2,440 m (8,005 ft)
- Never exceed speed: 413 km/h (257 mph, 223 kn)
- Range: 1,038 km (645 mi, 560 nmi)
- Service ceiling: 8,170 m (26,800 ft)
- Rate of climb: 7.7 m/s (1,520 ft/min)
- Wing loading: 91.5 kg/m^{2} (18.7 lb/sq ft)

== See also ==
Related development

- Beechcraft T-34 Mentor
- Fuji KM-2
- Fuji T-5
- Fuji T-7

Related lists

- List of military aircraft of Japan
