= 11th Flight Training Wing (JASDF) =

Japanese Air Force wing

- 第11飛行教育団
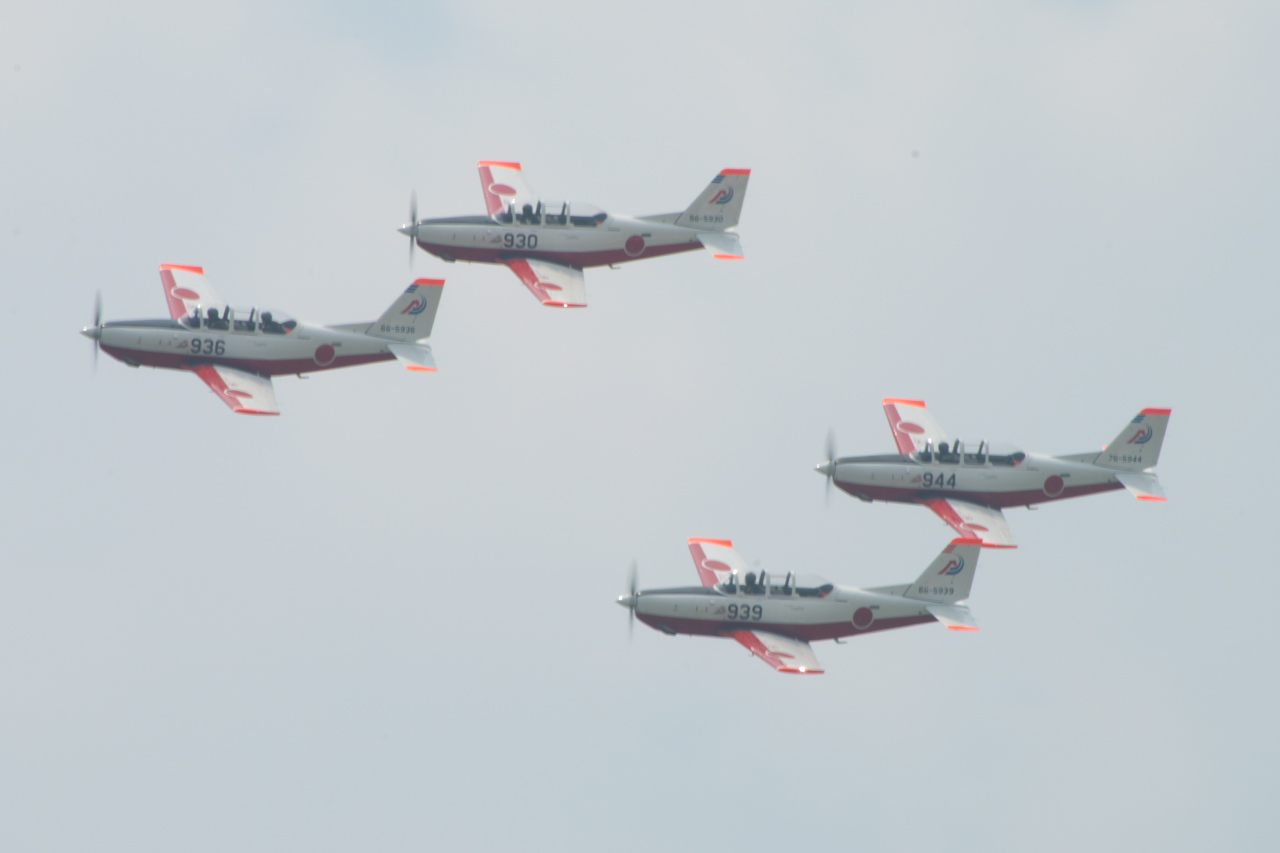
- 11th Wing Fuji T-7s
- Active: June 1, 1959
- Country: Japan
- Branch: Japan Air Self-Defense Force
- Part of: Air Training Command
- Garrison/HQ: Shizuhama Air Base

Aircraft flown
- Trainer: Fuji T-7

The 11th Flight Training Wing (第11飛行教育団, dai-11-hikō-kyōiku-dan) is a wing of the Japan Air Self-Defense Force. It is also sometimes known as the 11th Flying Training Wing. It comes under the authority of Air Training Command. It is based at Shizuhama Air Base in Shizuoka Prefecture.

It has two squadrons, both equipped with Fuji T-7 aircraft:

- 1st Flight Training Squadron
- 2nd Flight Training Squadron
