= RTAF-2 =

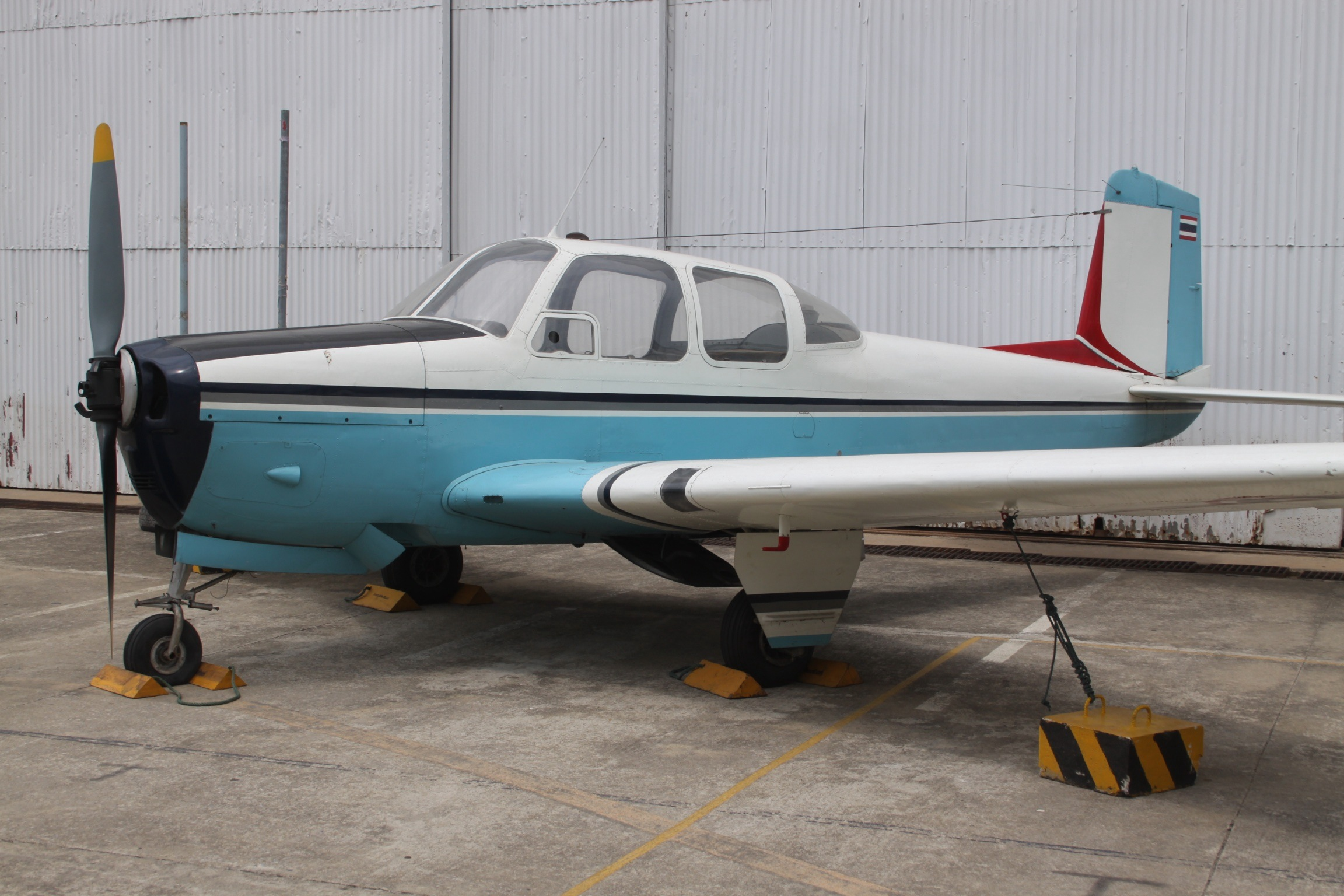

General information
- Type: Training and liaison aircraft
- National origin: Thailand
- Manufacturer: Royal Thai Air Force, Science and Weapon Systems Development Centre
- Status: Sole example in the Royal Thai Air Force Museum
- Primary user: Royal Thai Air Force
- Number built: 1 flying prototype

History
- First flight: 1957
- Developed from: Fuji LM-1

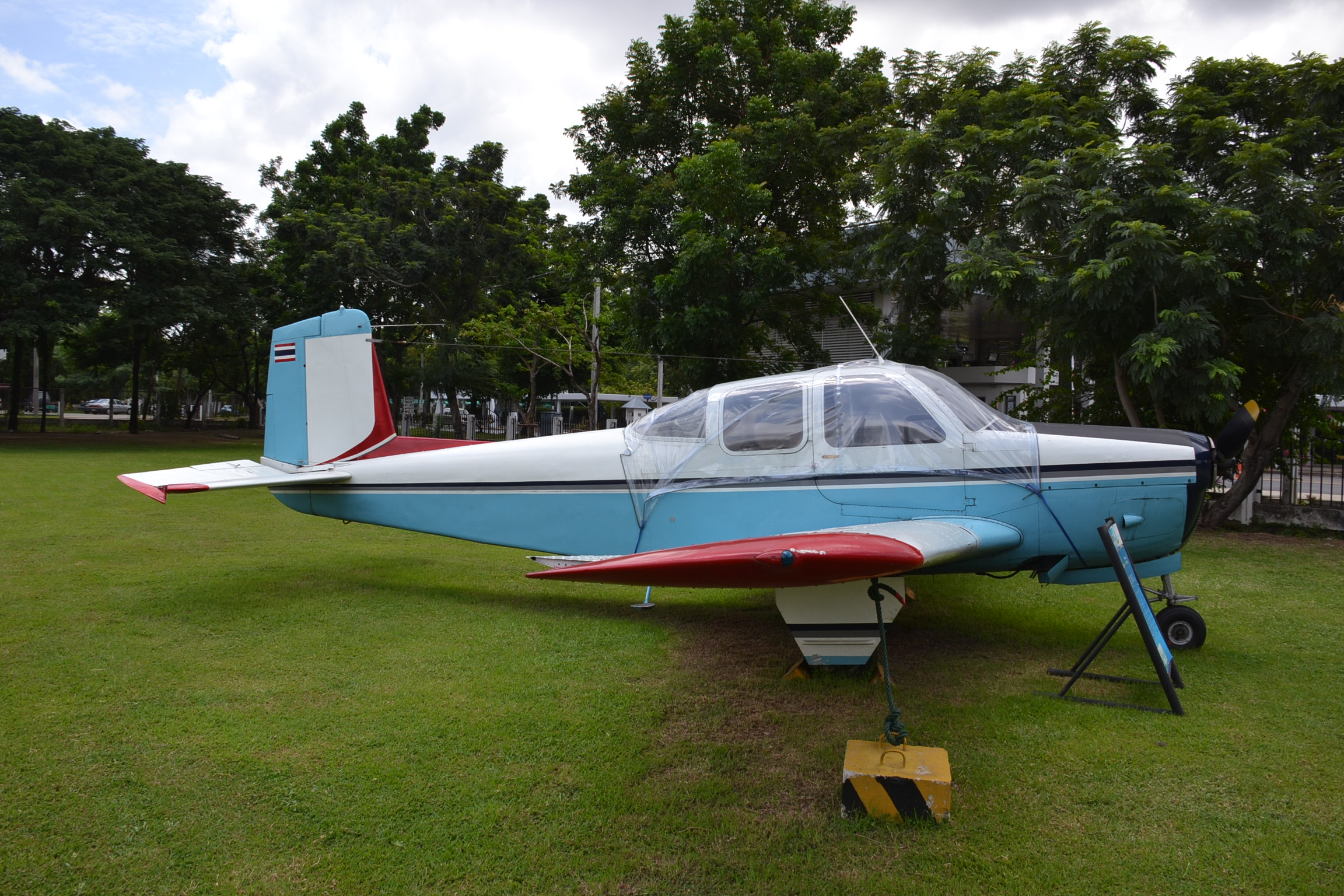
The sole RTAF 2 at the Royal Thai Air Force Museum, Don Mueang, Bangkok, on 24 July 2014.

The RTAF-2, officially designated B.ThO.2 (Thai: บ.ทอ.๒), is a single-engine training and liaison aircraft that was developed by the Royal Thai Air Force's Science and Weapon Systems Development Centre in 1957.

== Development ==
The RTAF-2 was developed from the Fuji LM-1 Nikko, itself a derivative of the Beechcraft Bonanza. One prototype was built in 1957 and tested in 1957–58, although no further production followed.

By 1984 the sole example had been turned over to the Royal Thai Air Force Museum, Don Mueang District, Bangkok.

== Operators ==
Thailand

- Royal Thai Air Force

== Aircraft on display ==
- Royal Thai Air Force Museum near Bangkok - sole example

== See also ==
Related development

- Fuji LM-1 Nikko

Related lists

- List of aircraft (R)
