= Tobu 634 series =

Electric multiple unit operated by Tobu Railway in Japan

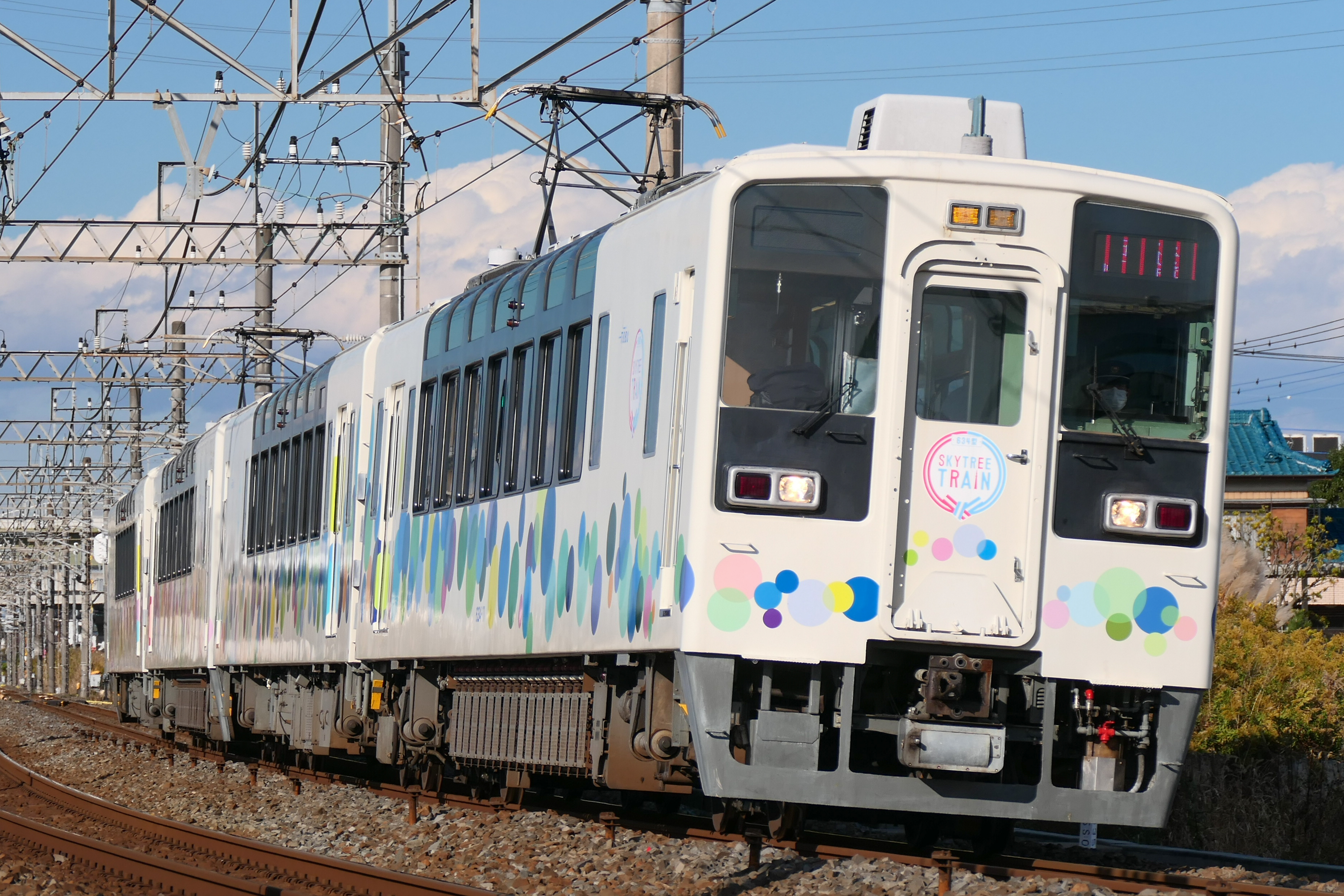
- The two 634 series in November 2021
- Entered service: 27 October 2012
- Refurbished: 2012
- Number built: 4 vehicles (2 sets)
- Number in service: 4 vehicles (2 sets)
- Formation: 2 cars per trainset
- Capacity: 59
- Operators: Tobu Railway
- Depots: Shin-Tochigi
- Lines served: Tobu Skytree Line; Tobu Nikko Line; Tobu Kinugawa Line

Specifications
- Car body construction: Steel
- Car length: 20 m (65 ft 7 in)
- Doors: One per side
- Electric system(s): 1,500 V DC
- Current collection: Overhead wire
- Track gauge: 1,067 mm (3 ft 6 in)

The Tobu 634 series (東武634系, Tōbu 634-kei) is an electric multiple unit (EMU) train type operated in Japan by the private railway operator Tobu Railway since 27 October 2012.

== Design ==
The two 2-car sets were rebuilt from former 6050 series sets 6177 and 6178 with completely new interiors and large windows extending into the roof line. The 634 series designation was chosen as it can be read as "Musashi" in Japanese, and coincides with the height in metres of the Tokyo Skytree. Set 1 has a blue theme inside and out, representing "sky", and set 2 has a red theme inside and out, representing "tree".

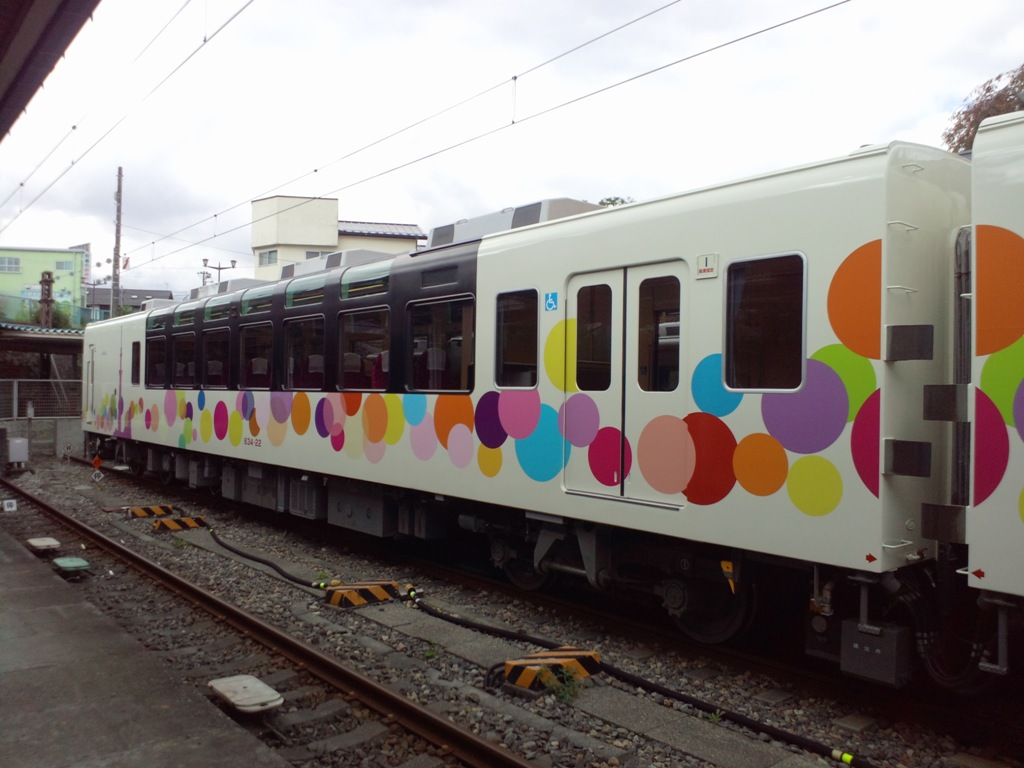
634-22, October 2012

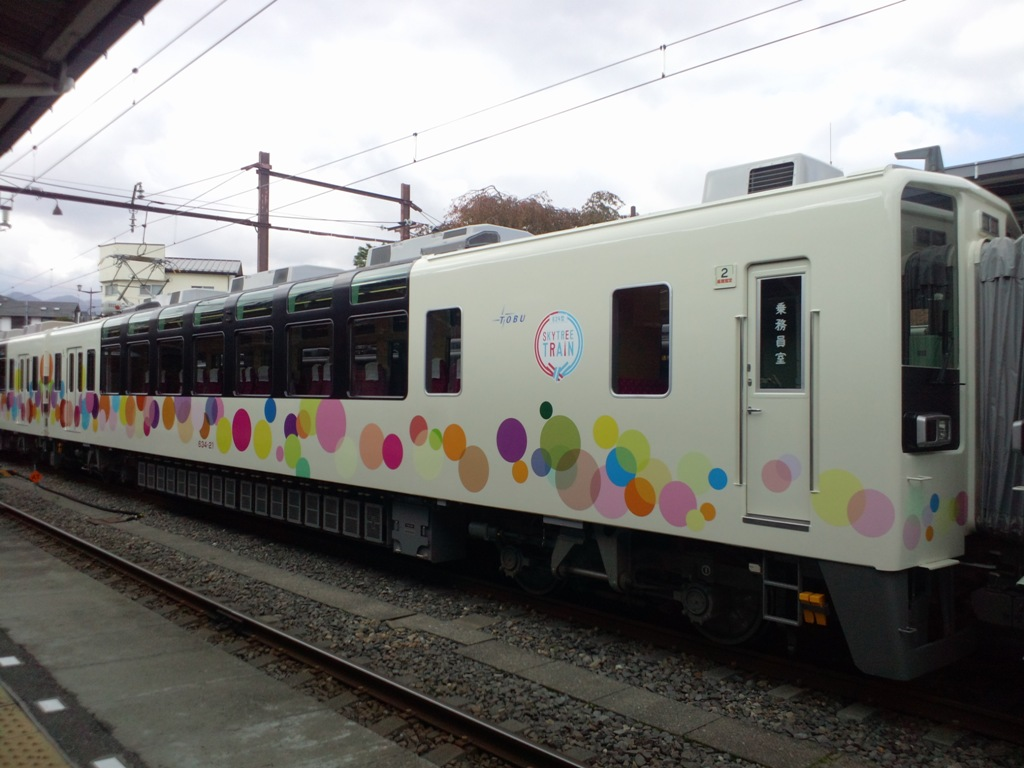
634-21, October 2012

== Formations ==
The two two-car sets are based at Shin-Tochigi Depot, and are formed as shown below with the Mc car at the southern end.

| Designation | Mc | Tc |
| Numbering | 634-x1 | 634-x2 |

The Mc car has one cross-arm pantograph.

== Interior ==
Set 1 has blue seating, and set 2 has red seating.

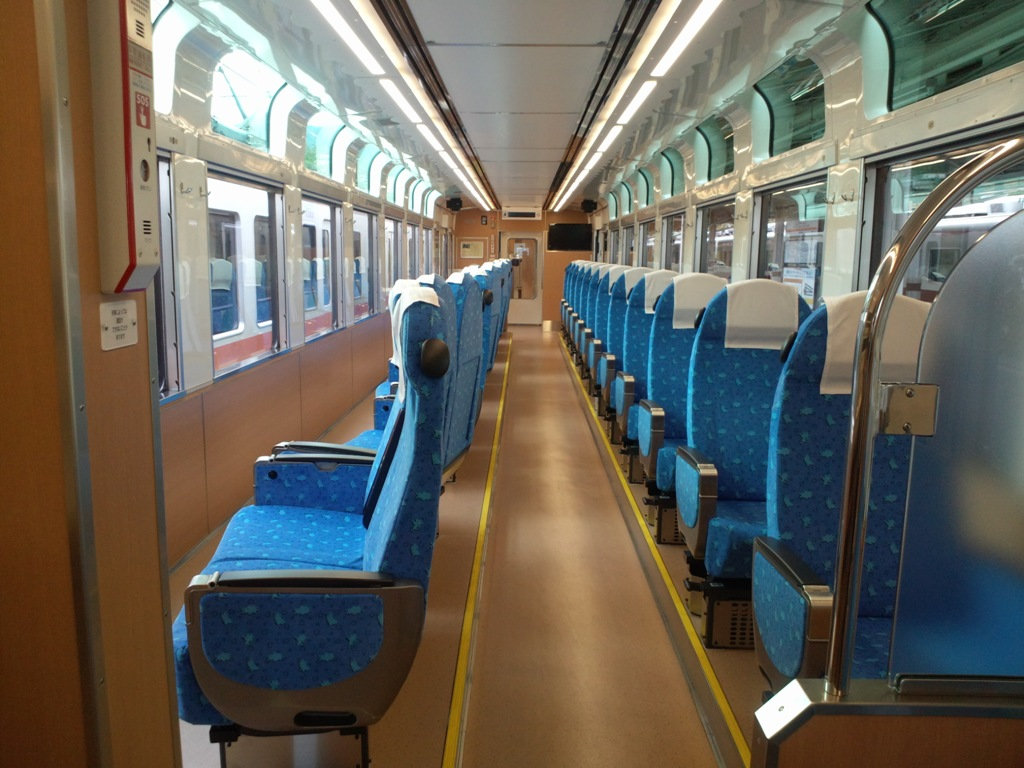
Interior of 634-11 with side-facing "pair seats"

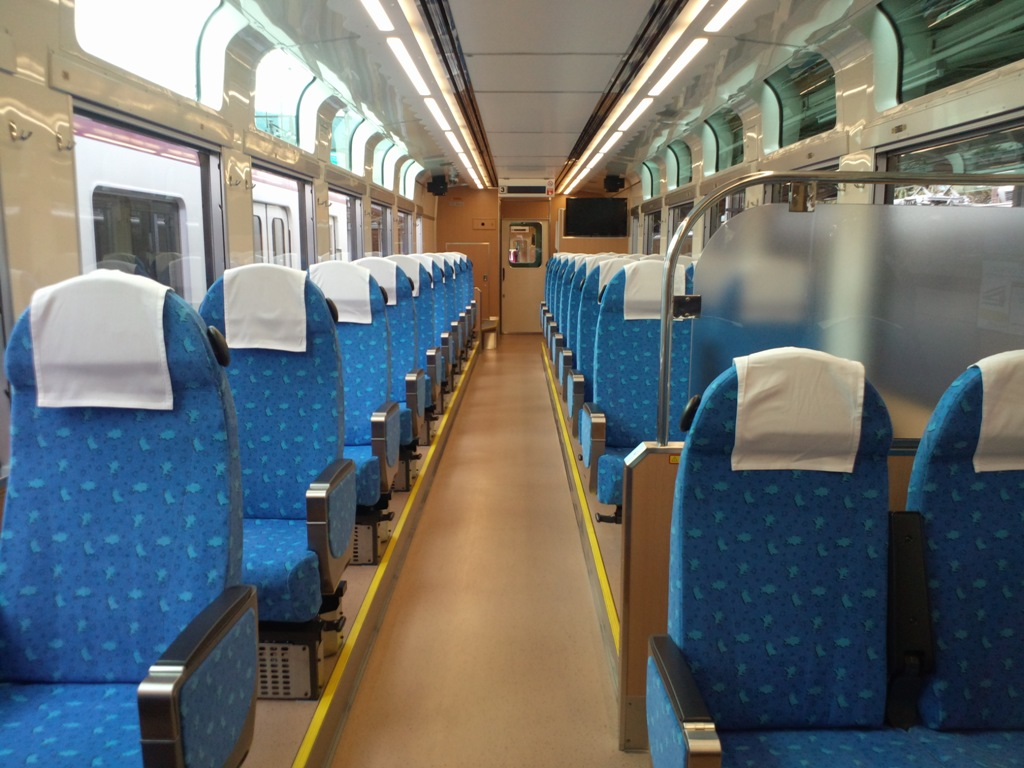
Interior of 634-12 with 1+2 seating

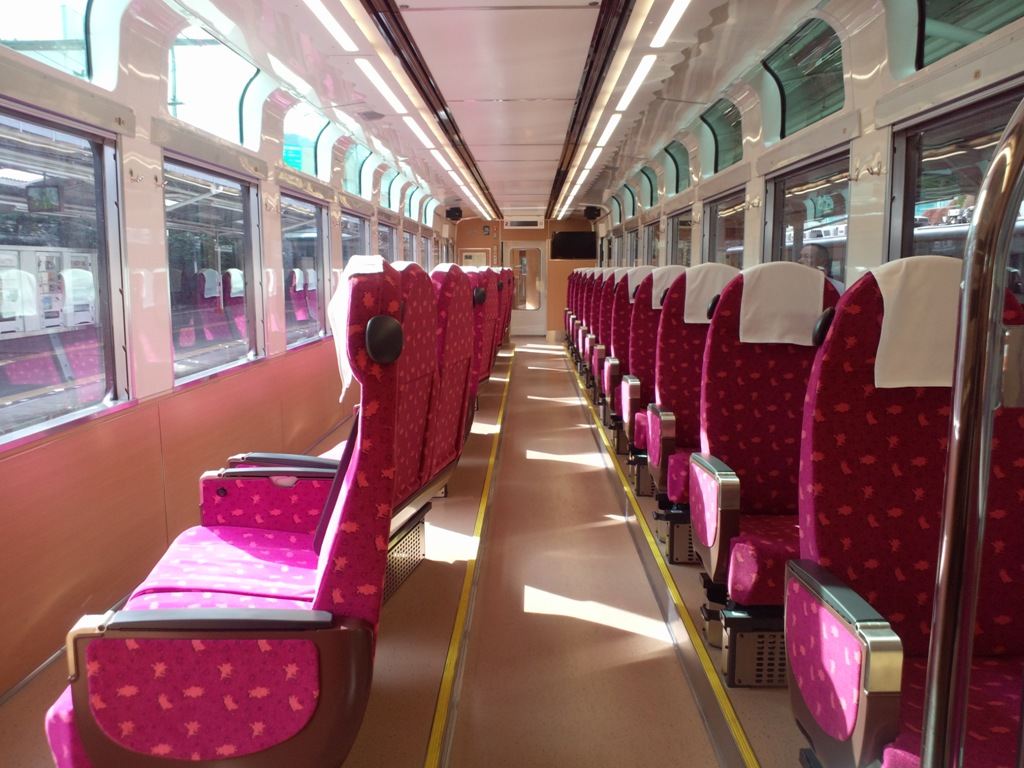
Interior of 634-21 with side-facing "pair seats"

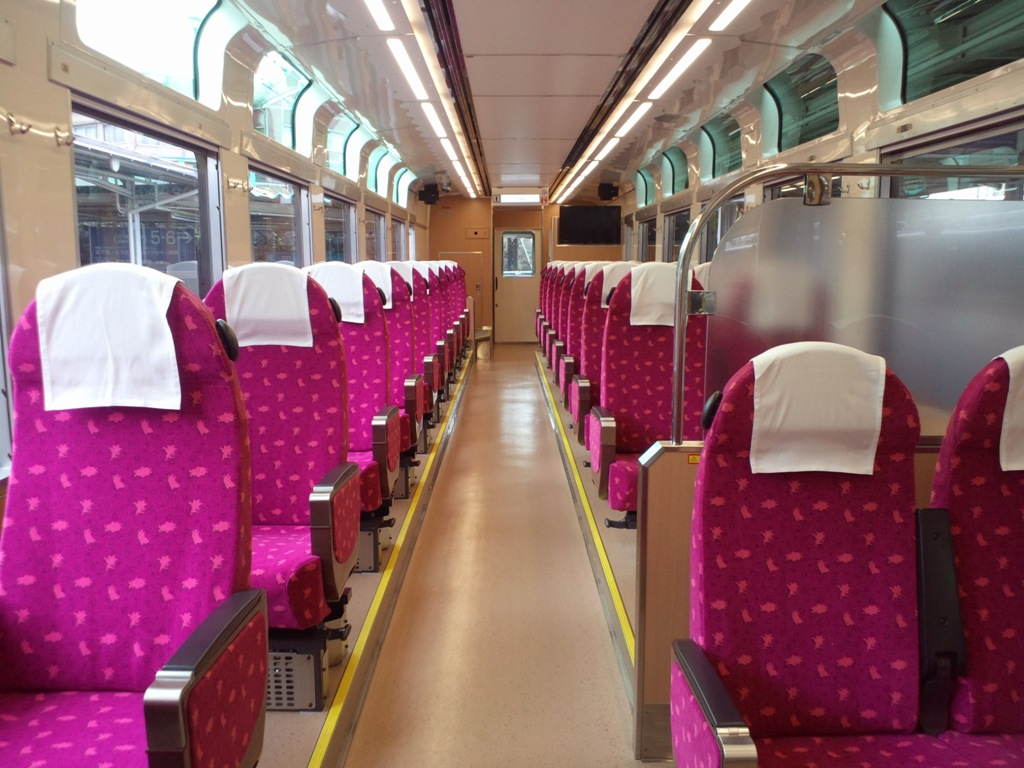
Interior of 634-22 with 1+2 seating
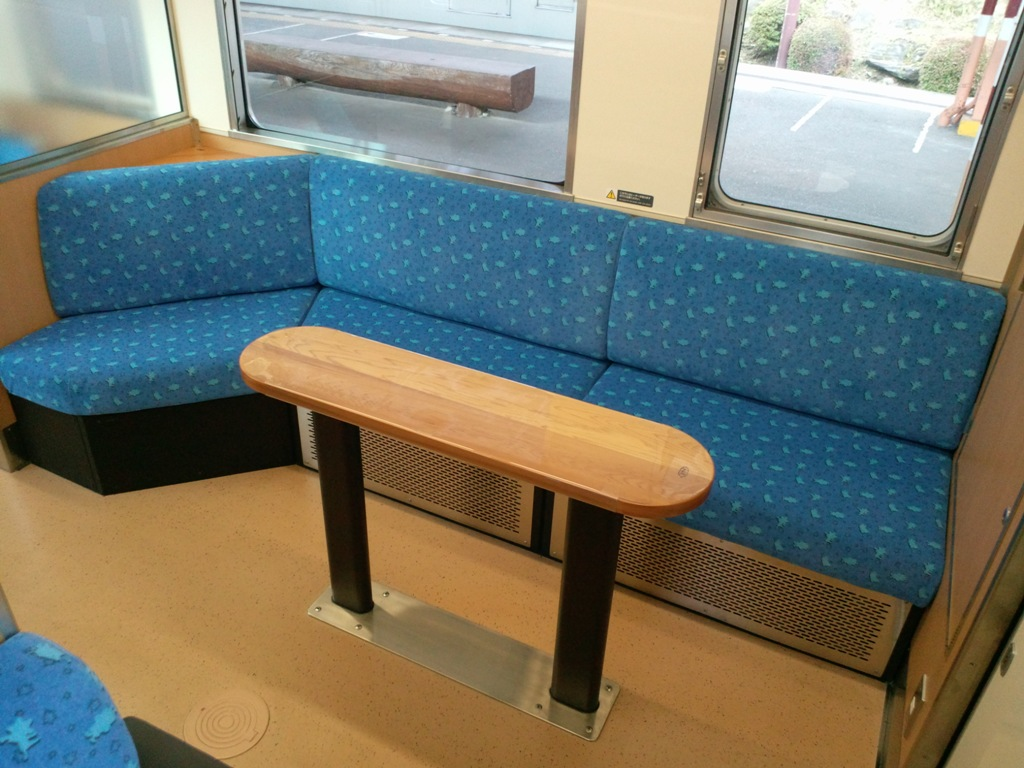
Lounge area in car 634-11

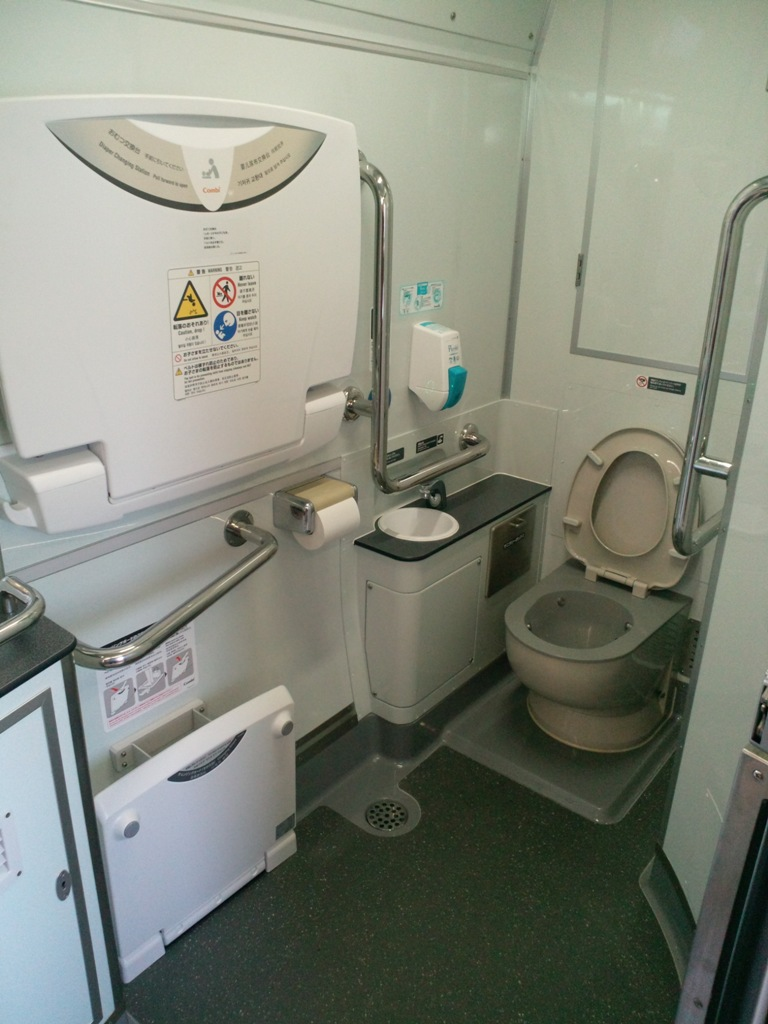
Universal access toilet in car 634-12

== History ==
The two former 6050 series sets were rebuilt at J-TREC's Yokohama factory, and delivered to Tobu at the end of September 2012. The trains entered service on 27 October 2012. The former Skytree Train limited express services were discontinued from the start of the revised timetable on 21 April 2017.
