= Fuji KM-2 =

Japanese military trainer aircraft

KM-2
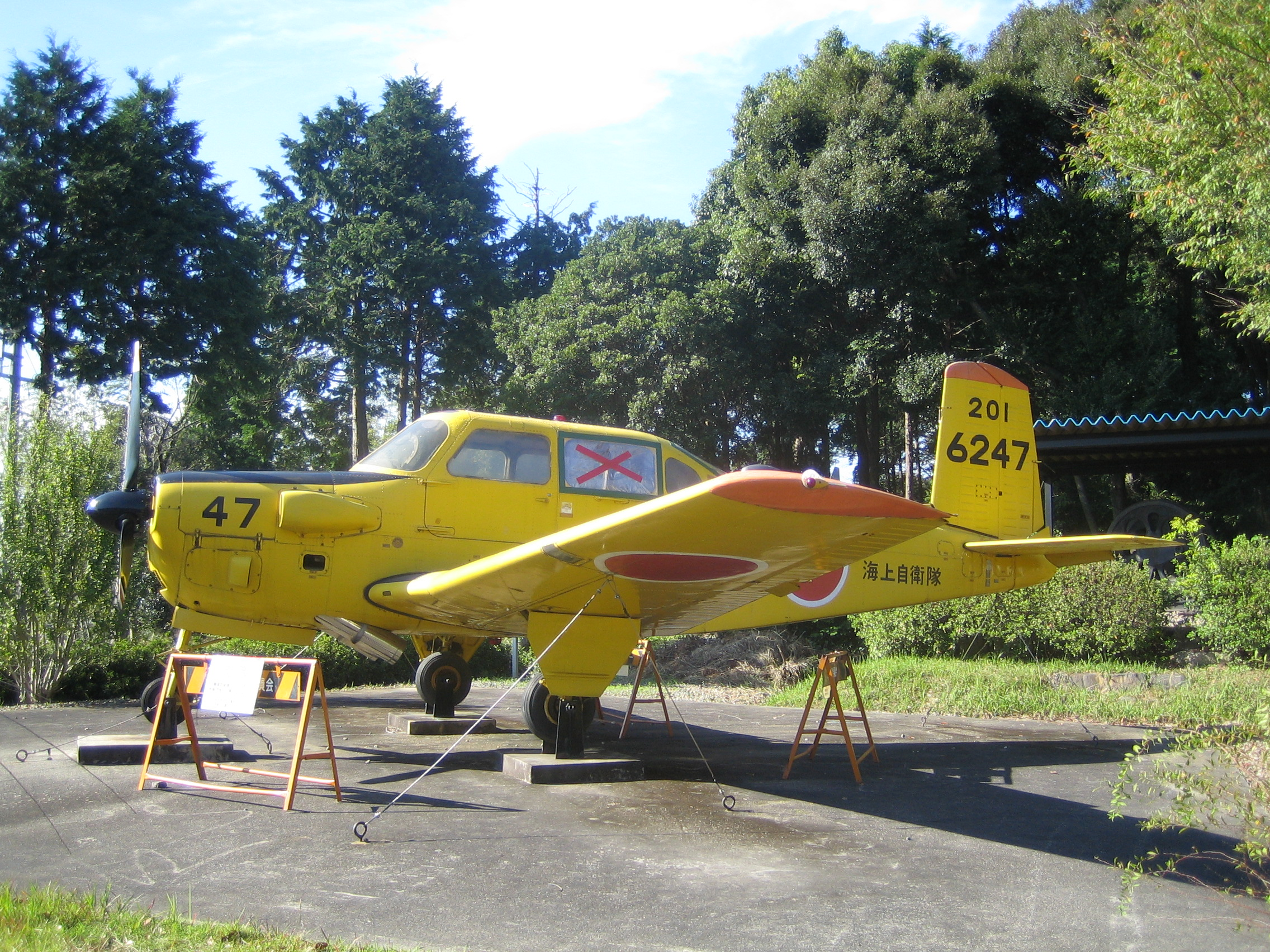

General information
- Type: Primary trainer
- Manufacturer: Fuji
- Primary users: Japan Air Self-Defense Force Japan Maritime Self-Defense Force; Japan Ground Self-Defense Force
- Number built: 64

History
- Manufactured: 1962-1992
- Introduction date: 1962
- First flight: 16 January 1962
- Retired: Retired from military service in 1998
- Developed from: Fuji LM-1 Nikko
- Developed into: Fuji T-3; Fuji T-5

The Fuji KM-2 is a Japanese propeller-driven light aircraft, which was developed by Fuji Heavy Industries from the Beechcraft T-34 Mentor which Fuji built under licence. Various versions have been used as primary trainers by the Japan Self-Defense Forces.

== Design and development ==
Fuji Heavy Industries was established in July 1952 as a successor to Nakajima, and undertook licensed production of the Beech T-34 trainer aircraft as its first product. This was used by Fuji for the development of the Fuji LM-1 Nikko which was a four-seat liaison aircraft powered by a 225 hp Continental O-470 engine, with introduction of a more powerful 340 hp Lycoming O-480 engine resulting in redesignation as the LM-2, with both the LM-1 and LM-2 being used by the Japan Ground Self-Defense Force.

The KM was a four-seat civil version of the LM-1, fitted with the more powerful Lycoming engine that was later used by the LM-2. After the KM was used by the Japanese government for civil pilot training, the KM-2 was developed as a side-by-side two-seat trainer, first flying on 16 January 1962. Sixty-two were purchased by the Japan Maritime Self-Defense Force as primary trainers, with a further two purchased by the Japan Ground Self-Defense Force as the TL-1.

The KM-2B was a further development of the KM-2 for use as a primary trainer for the Japan Air Self-Defense Force. It combined the structure and engine of the KM-2 with the tandem cockpit of the T-34 Mentor, first flying on 17 January 1978. Fifty were purchased by the JASDF as the Fuji T-3, production continuing until 1992.

== Operators ==
Japan

- Japan Air Self-Defense Force
- Japan Maritime Self-Defense Force
- Japan Ground Self-Defense Force

== Specifications (KM-2) ==
Data from Jane's All The World's Aircraft 1966–1967

General characteristics

- Crew: 2
- Length: 7.94 m (26 ft 1 in)
- Wingspan: 10.0 m (32 ft 10 in)
- Height: 2.92 m (9 ft 7 in)
- Wing area: 16.49 m^{2} (177.5 sq ft)
- Empty weight: 1,134 kg (2,500 lb)
- Max takeoff weight: 1,750 kg (3,858 lb)
- Fuel capacity: 189 L (50 US gal; 42 imp gal) normal, provision for further 76 L (20 US gal; 17 imp gal) in auxiliary tanks
- Powerplant: 1 × Lycoming IGSO-480-A1A6 air-cooled flat-six engine, 250 kW (340 hp)
- Propellers: 3-bladed Hartzell HC-83X20-1B/9333C-3 constant-speed propeller, 2.29 m (7 ft 6 in) diameter

Performance

- Maximum speed: 378 km/h (235 mph, 204 kn) at 4,880 m (16,000 ft)
- Cruise speed: 304 km/h (189 mph, 164 kn) at 3,050 m (10,000 ft)
- Stall speed: 100 km/h (62 mph, 54 kn) (flaps down)
- Range: 975 km (606 mi, 526 nmi)
- Service ceiling: 8,170 m (26,800 ft)
- Rate of climb: 7.7 m/s (1,520 ft/min)
- Takeoff distance to 15 m (50 ft): 440 m (1,444 ft)
- Landing distance from 15 m (50 ft): 375 m (1,230 ft)

== See also ==
Related development

- Beech T-34
- Fuji T-3
- Fuji T-5
- Fuji T-7
