= Subaru Corporation =

Japanese multinational automotive company

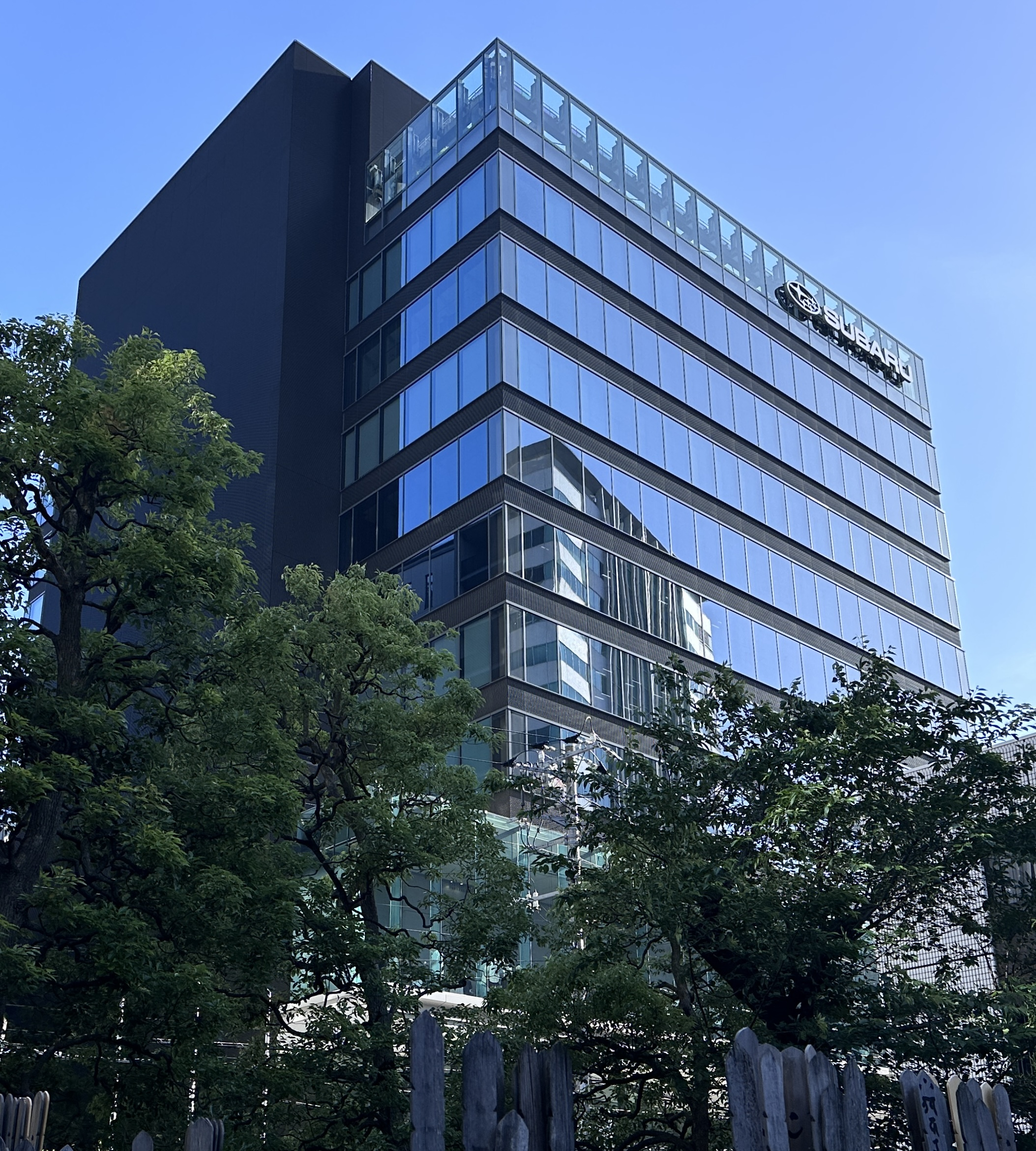
- Subaru's headquarters in Ebisu, Shibuya
- Native name: 株式会社SUBARU
- Romanized name: Kabushiki-gaisha SUBARU
- Formerly: Fuji Heavy Industries, Ltd. (1953–2017)
- Type: Public
- Traded as: TYO: 7270; TOPIX Large 70 Component
- Industry: Automotive, transportation equipment manufacturing, defense
- Predecessor: Nakajima Aircraft Company
- Founded: July 15, 1953; 73 years ago
- Headquarters: Ebisu, Shibuya, Tokyo, Japan
- Key people: Tomomi Nakamura (chairman); Atsushi Osaki (president and CEO)
- Products: Automobiles, aircraft, aircraft parts, helicopters
- Revenue: ▲¥3,344.11 billion (Note: The FY2020 (Fiscal Year 2020) in this article is from April 1, 2019 to March 31, 2020.) (FY2020)
- Operating income: ▲¥210.32 billion (FY2020)
- Net income: ▲¥152.59 billion (FY2020)
- Total assets: ▲¥3,293.91 billion (FY2020)
- Total equity: ▲¥1,720.12 billion (FY2020)
- Owners: Toyota (20.42%); The Master Trust Bank of Japan investment trusts (14.15%); Custody Bank of Japan investment trusts (5.28%); State Street Bank West Client - Treaty 505234 (1.56%); (as of September 30, 2024)
- Divisions: Automobile (Subaru); Aerospace
- Website: subaru.co.jp

Subaru Corporation (株式会社SUBARU, Kabushiki-gaisha Subaru), formerly Fuji Heavy Industries, Ltd. (富士重工業株式会社, Fuji Jūkōgyō Kabushiki gaisha), is a Japanese multinational corporation and conglomerate primarily involved in both terrestrial and aerospace transportation manufacturing. It is best known for its line of Subaru automobiles. Founded in 1953, the company was named Fuji Heavy Industries until 2017. The company's aerospace division is a defense contractor to the Japanese government, manufacturing Boeing and Lockheed Martin helicopters and airplanes under license. This same division is a global development and manufacturing partner to both companies.

== History ==
Fuji Heavy Industries traces its roots to the Nakajima Aircraft Company, a leading supplier of airplanes to the Japanese government during World War II. At the end of World War II, Nakajima was broken up by the Allied Occupation government under keiretsu legislation, and by 1950 part of the separated operation was already known as Fuji Heavy Industries.

FHI was incorporated on July 15, 1953, when five Japanese companies, known as Fuji Kogyo, Fuji Jidosha Kogyo, Omiya Fuji Kogyo, Utsunomiya Sharyo, and Tokyo Fuji Sangyo, joined to form one of Japan's largest manufacturers of transportation equipment.

By late 1980s, the company was a major supplier of military, aerospace and railroad equipment in Japan, but 80% of its sales came from automobiles. Sales in 1989 fell 15% to US$4.3 billion. In 1990, the company faced a loss of over US$500 million. Industrial Bank of Japan Ltd., the main bank of the company, asked Nissan, which owned 4.2% of the company, to step in. Nissan sent Isamu Kawai, the president of Nissan Diesel Motor Co., to take charge of FHI. In 1991, FHI started contract-manufacturing Nissan Pulsar (Nissan Sunny in Europe) sedans and hatchbacks.

Currently, the Subaru Corporation makes Subaru brand cars, and its aerospace division makes utility and attack helicopters for the Japanese Self Defense Force, trainers, unmanned aerial vehicles, and the center wings of Boeing 777 and Boeing 787 jets. In the past, FHI made parts for the Hawker Beechcraft and Eclipse Aviation business jets.

In 2003, the company adopted the logo of its Subaru automobile division as its worldwide corporate symbol.

On October 5, 2005 Toyota purchased 8.7% of FHI shares from General Motors, which had owned 20.1% since 1999. GM later divested its remaining 11.4% stake on the open market to sever all ties with FHI. FHI previously stated there might have been 27 million shares (3.4%) acquired before the start of trading by an unknown party on October 6, 2005, and speculation suggested a bank or perhaps another automaker was involved. After the purchase, Toyota announced a contract with Subaru on March 13, 2006, to use the underutilized Subaru manufacturing facility in Lafayette, Indiana, as well as plans to hire up to 1,000 workers and set aside an assembly line for the Camry, beginning in the second quarter of 2007.

In June 2014, the company entered into a contract with Boeing Commercial Airplanes, as one of five major Japanese companies contracted, to build parts for Boeing's 777X aircraft.

In May 2016, Fuji Heavy Industries announced that it would change its name to Subaru Corporation, with the change effective on April 1, 2017.

== Leadership ==
- Kenji Kita (1953–1956)
- Takao Yoshida (1956–1963)
- Nobuo Yokoda (1963–1970)
- Eiichi Ohara (1970–1978)
- Sasaki Sadamichi (1978–1985)
- Toshihiro Tajima (1985–1990)
- Isamu Kawaii (1990–1996)
- Takeshi Tanaka (1996–2001)
- Kyoji Takenaka (2001–2006)
- Ikuo Mori (2006–2011)
- Yasuyuki Yoshinaga (2011–2018)
- Tomomi Nakamura (2018–2023)
- Atsushi Osaki (2023–present)

== Divisions ==
Subaru has two main divisions:

- The automobile division, Subaru.
- The aerospace division is a contractor for the Japan Defense Agency and markets and sells both commercial and defense-related aircraft, helicopters and target drones. It will also be responsible for providing maintenance for the Bell-Boeing V-22 Osprey tilt rotor aircraft. This division previously built the FA-200 Aero Subaru and is currently participating in the Airbus A380, Boeing 777, Boeing 787, Hawker 4000 and Eclipse 500 programs, and supplies parts for the Boeing 737, Boeing 747 and Boeing 767.

== Former divisions ==
- Subaru discontinued the production of buses and railroad cars in 2003.
- The eco technology division manufactured and sold garbage trucks, robot sweepers, and wind turbines.
- Discontinued in 2017, the Subaru Industrial Power Products division manufactured and sold commercial engines, pumps and generators which were formerly under the Subaru-Robin and Robin brands. Subaru's industrial products division began manufacturing "Star" engines for Polaris Industries snowmobiles in 1968 but engine manufacturing operations ended in 1998 when Polaris Industries started to build their own Liberty two-stroke engines. Subaru remains an invested partner with, and supplier of pistons to, Polaris. Subaru has provided more than 2 million engines used in Polaris snowmobiles, ATVs, watercraft and utility vehicles.

== Products ==
=== Bus models ===
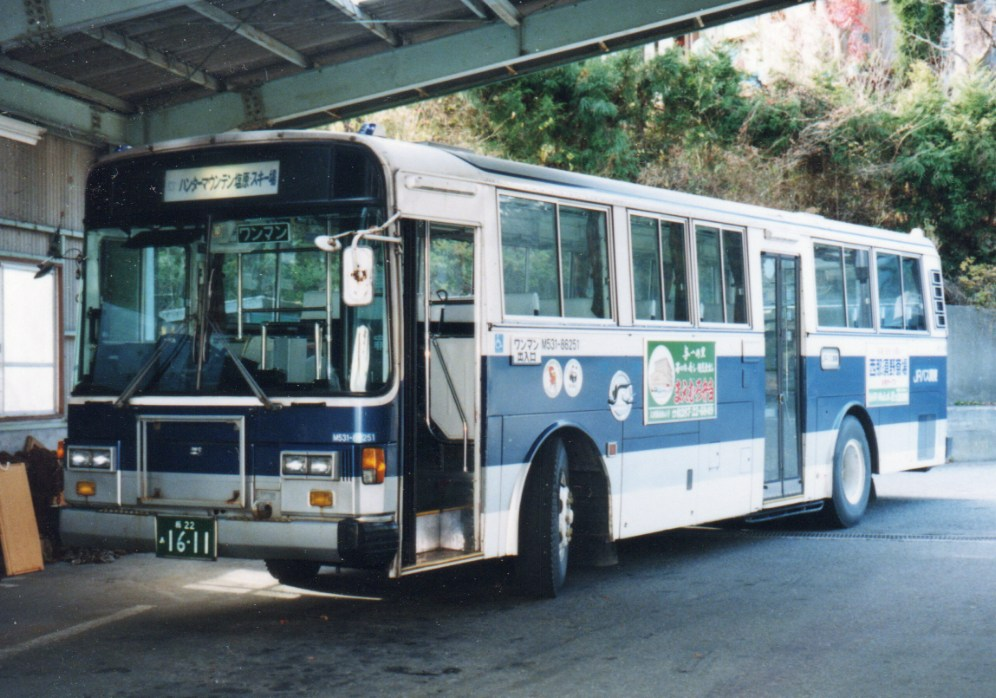
A 5E body with Isuzu Cubic chassis

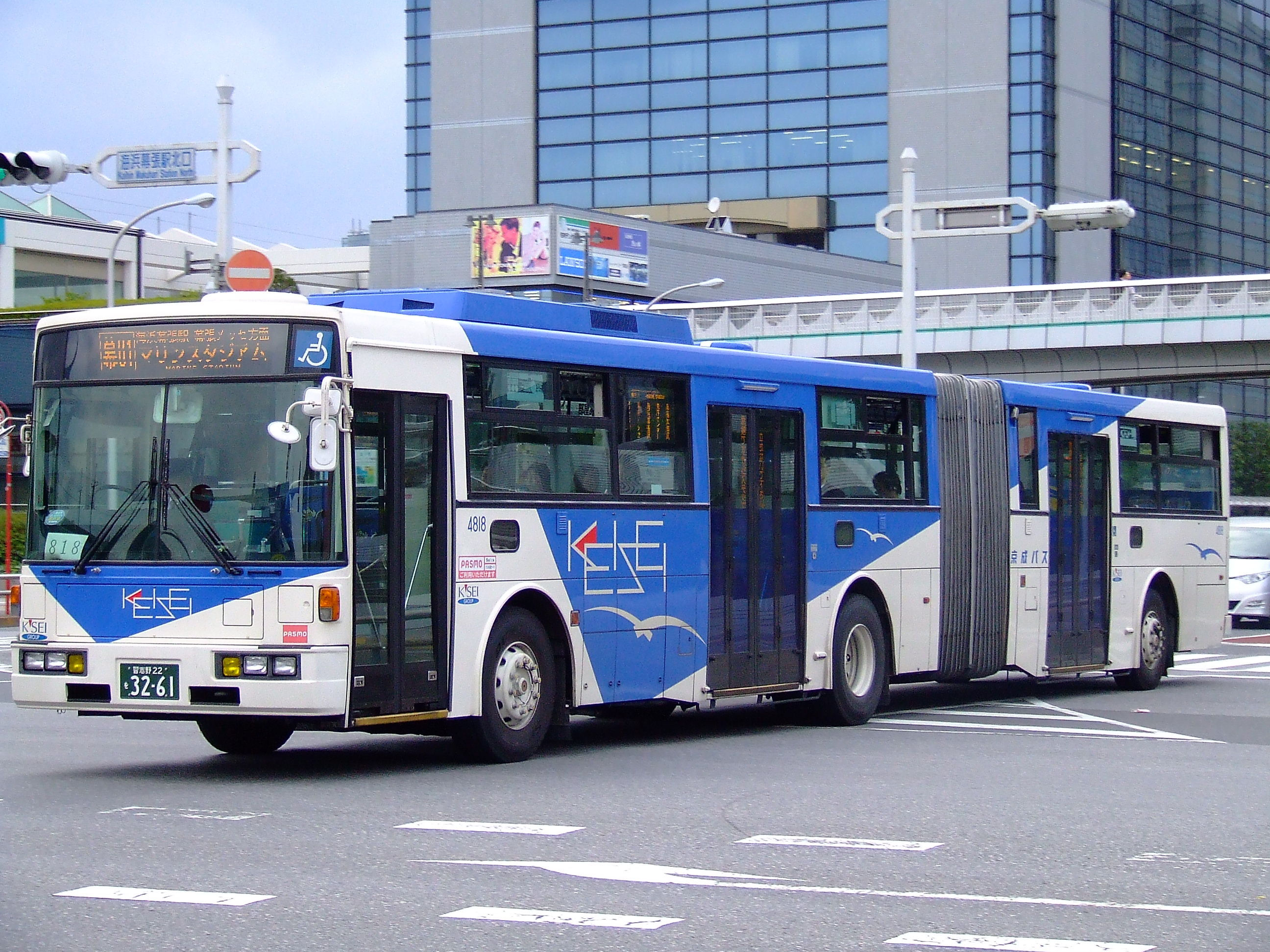
A 7E body articulated bus with Volvo B10M chassis

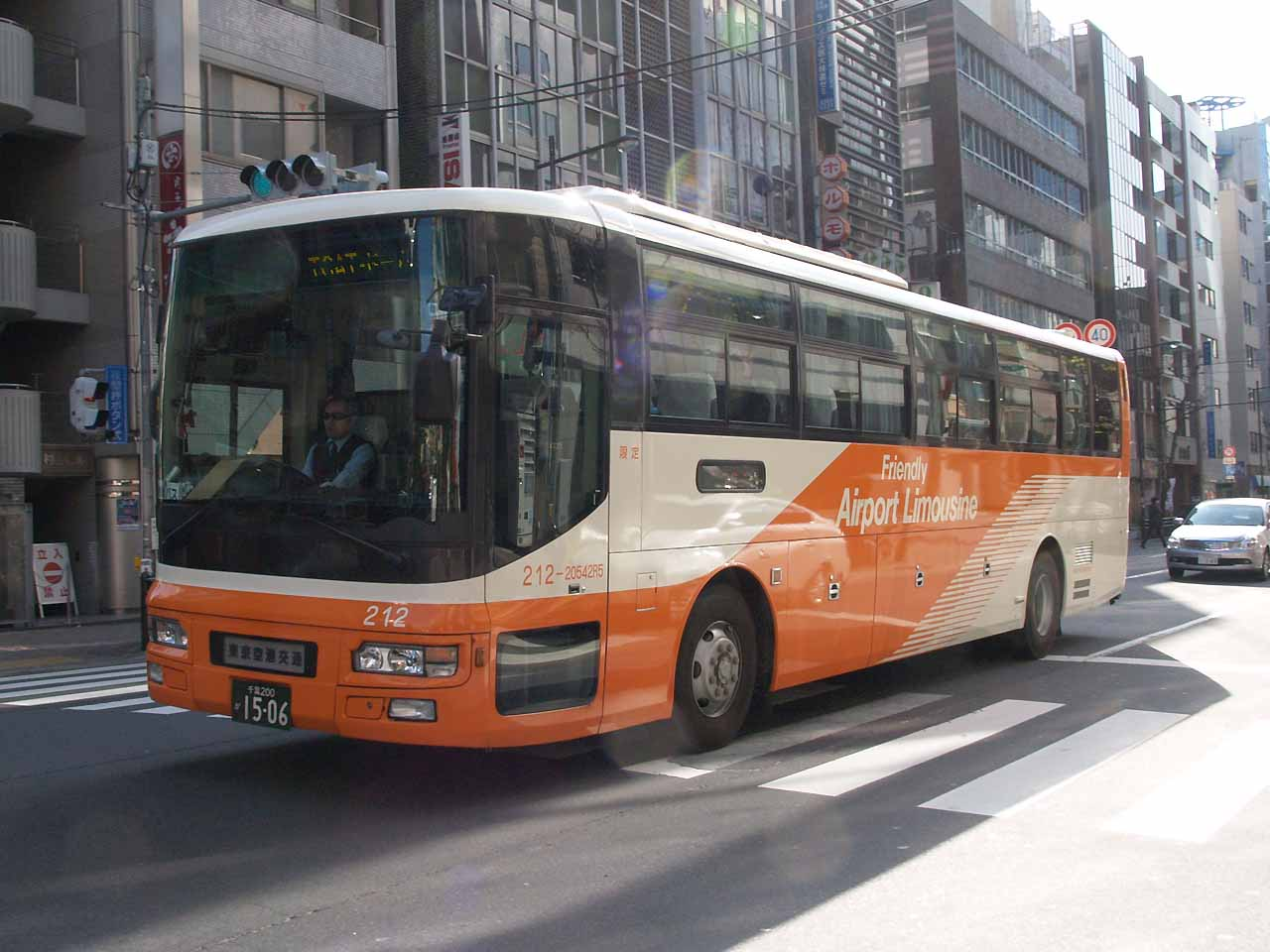
A 1M body with Nissan Diesel Space Arrow chassis

- R13
  - 13
  - 3A/3B/3D/3E
  - R1/R2
- R14
  - 14
  - 4B/4E
- R15
  - 5B/5E
  - R1/R2/R3
  - HD1/HD2/HD3
  - Double-decker
- R16
  - 6B/6E
  - H1
- R17
  - 7B/7E
  - 7HD
  - 7S
- R18
  - 8B/8E
- R21
  - 1M/1S

=== Aircraft ===
- Fuji FA-200 Aero Subaru (1965) - monoplane/light aircraft
- Fuji/Rockwell Commander 700 (1975) - light transport
- Fuji KM-2 (1962) - light primary military trainer
- Fuji LM-1 Nikko (1955) - light communications military aircraft
- Fuji T-1 (1958) - intermediate military jet trainer
- Fuji T-3/KM-2 (1974) - primary military trainer
- Fuji T-5/KM-2 Kai (1984) - basic military trainer
- Fuji T-7/T-3 Kai (1998) - primary military trainer
- Fuji TACOM UAV.
- Subaru-Bell UH-X - Ongoing project to meet the JGSDF's requirement for a UH-1J replacement. Bell Helicopter is Fuji's foreign partner in the competition. A variant of the UH-X may also ultimately fill the JMSDF's recently (October 2014) revealed requirement for a New Patrol Helicopter (to enter service in 2022).

=== Railway rolling stock ===
Some products were built in Utsunomiya Sharyo era (1950–1955).

==== Japan ====
DMU

- JNR - 10, 20, 35, 40, 45, 55, 58, 80, 181, 183, 185, 191 series,

31, 32, 37, 54 types

- JR Hokkaido - KiHa 150, KiHa 201, KiHa 281, KiHa 283, and KiHa 261 series.
- JR East - KiHa 100 and 110 series
- JR Central - KiHa 85 series
- JR Shikoku - 2000 series
- Mōka Railway - Mooka 14 type - The final products of railway rolling stock as Subaru
- Chizu Express - HOT7000 series

Passenger Car

- JNR - 10, 12, 14, 24, 50 series rail car
- JR East - E26 series

EMU

- JNR - 70, 80 series
- Tobu Railway - 300, 2000, 5000, 6050, 8000, 9000, 10000, 30000 series
- Tokyo subway - Teito Rapid Transit Authority (TRTA) 2000 series

Tram

- Tobu Railway - 100, 200 series
- Tokyo Metropolitan Bureau of Transportation - 2500, 6000 type

==== Russia ====
- DMU - D2

==== Thailand ====
- DMU - NKF
