= Fuji T-7 =

Japanese military trainer aircraft

T-7
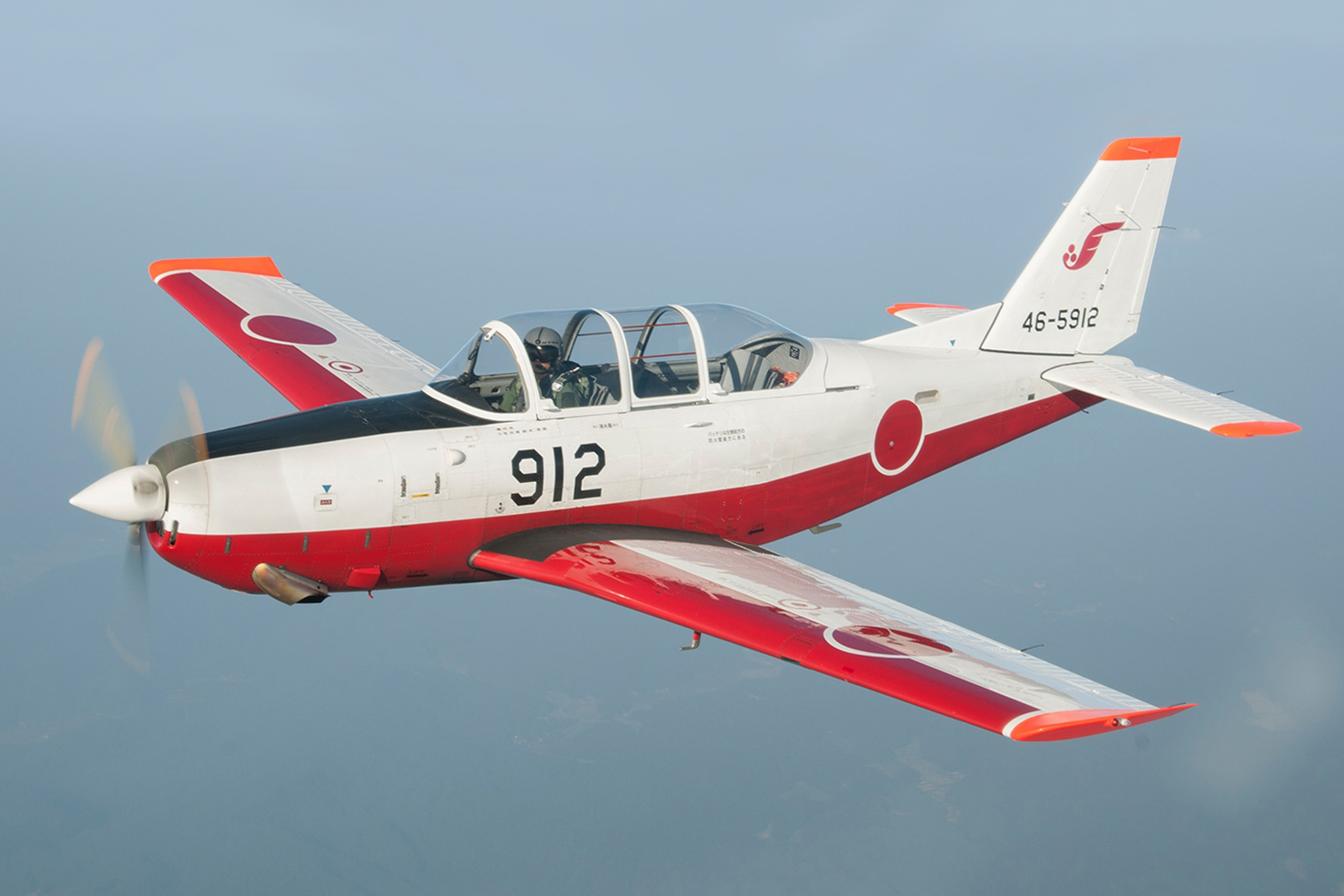
- T-7s in flight

General information
- Type: Primary/Basic Trainer
- National origin: Japan
- Manufacturer: Fuji Heavy Industries
- Status: Active
- Primary user: Japan Air Self-Defense Force
- Number built: 49

History
- Manufactured: 2002-present
- Developed from: Fuji T-3

The Fuji T-7 (previously T-3 Kai) is a Japanese primary trainer aircraft built by Fuji Heavy Industries for the Japan Air Self-Defense Force. A development of Fuji's earlier T-3 trainer, it is a single-engined monoplane powered by a turboprop engine.

== Design and development ==
The Fuji T-7 was developed to meet a requirement of Japan's Air Self Defence Force for a primary or basic trainer to replace the Fuji T-3. The resultant aircraft was a modified version of the T-3, (itself descended via the Fuji KM-2 from the Beech T-34) and shared the single-engined low-winged monoplane layout of the T-3, but replaced the Lycoming piston engine with an Allison 250 turboprop engine.

The T-7 was selected in preference to the Pilatus PC-7 in 1998, but this decision was cancelled and the competition restarted after a corruption scandal arose, with several managers from Fuji being arrested for bribing an official in Japan's ruling Liberal Democratic Party. Fuji re-entered the T-7 (then known as the T-3 Kai) and again won the restarted competition in September 2000.

== Operational history ==
The first production aircraft was handed over to the JASDF in September 2002.

== Operators ==
Japan

- Japan Air Self-Defense Force
  - Air Training Command:
    - 11th Flight Training Wing
      - 1st Flight Training Squadron
      - 2nd Flight Training Squadron
    - 12th Flight Training Wing (2005-)
      - 1st Flight Training Squadron (2005-)
      - 2nd Flight Training Squadron (2005-)
  - Air Development and Test Command
    - Air Development and Test Wing

== Specifications (T-7) ==
Data from Jane's All the World's Aircraft 2003-04

General characteristics

- Crew: 2
- Length: 8.59 m (28 ft 2 in)
- Wingspan: 10.04 m (32 ft 11 in)
- Height: 2.96 m (9 ft 9 in)
- Wing area: 16.5 m^{2} (178 sq ft)
- Airfoil: root: NACA 23016.5; tip: NACA 23012
- Max takeoff weight: 1,585 kg (3,494 lb)
- Powerplant: 1 × Rolls-Royce 250-B17F turboprop engine, 336 kW (451 hp)
- Propellers: 3-bladed constant-speed propeller, 2.12 m (6 ft 11 in) diameter

Performance

- Cruise speed: 298 km/h (185 mph, 161 kn) at 915 m (3,002 ft)
- Stall speed: 104 km/h (65 mph, 56 kn) flaps and gear down
- Wing loading: 96.1 kg/m^{2} (19.7 lb/sq ft)
- Power/mass: 0.2114 kW/kg (0.1286 hp/lb)
- Take-off distance to 15 m (49 ft): 608 m (1,995 ft)
- Landing distance from 15 m (49 ft): 566 m (1,857 ft)

Avionics

- VHF radio
- UHF radio
- Transponder
- ICS
- TacAN

== See also ==
Related development

- Beechcraft T-34 Mentor
- Fuji KM-2
- Fuji T-3
- Fuji T-5

Aircraft of comparable role, configuration, and era

- Pilatus PC-9
- Beechcraft T-6 Texan II
- KAI KT-1 Woongbi
- PZL-130 Orlik
- Embraer EMB 312 Tucano
- HAL HTT-40
- TAI Hürkuş
