= Shizuhama Air Base =

Shizuhama Air Base Yaizu/Shizuhama Air Base
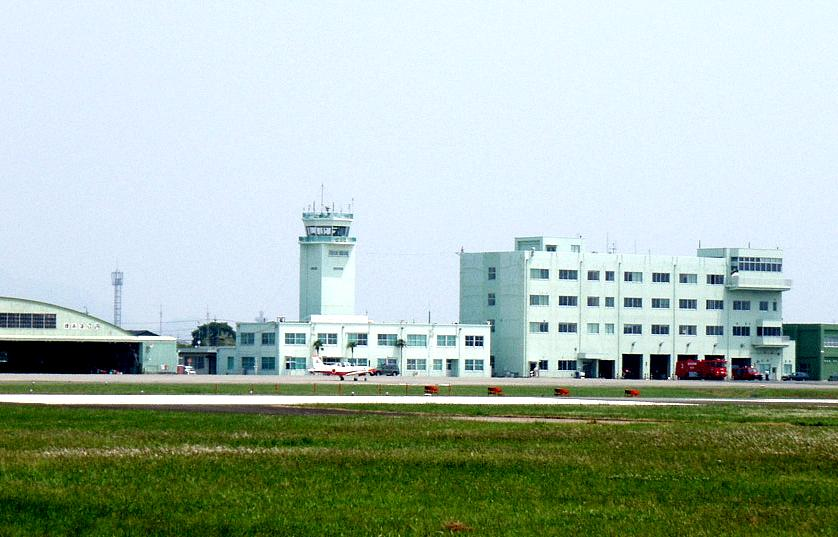
- IATA: none; ICAO: RJNY

Summary
- Airport type: Military
- Owner: Ministry of Defense
- Operator: JASDF
- Location: Yaizu, Shizuoka, Japan
- Elevation AMSL: 23 ft / 7 m
- Coordinates: 34°48′46″N 138°17′53″E
- Website: Official website

Map
- Location in Japan RJNY (Japan)

Runways
Direction	Length		Surface
Direction	m	ft	Surface
09/27	1,500	4,921	Asphalt
- Source: Japanese AIP at AIS Japan

Shizuhama Air Base (静浜基地, Shizuhama-kichi) (ICAO: RJNY) is a Japan Air Self-Defense Force base located in the city of Yaizu, Shizuoka Prefecture, in central Japan. It is the smallest air base in Japan with a functional runway.

== History ==
Shizuhama Air Base was established in December 1944 as the Fujieda Naval Air Station of the Imperial Japanese Navy Air Service. After World War II, the base facilities came under the control of the United States, and were returned to the Japanese government in August 1958, at which time the base was given its present name. From June 1959, the base became host to the JASDF 15th Training Wing. In May 1964, the 15th Training Wing was deactivated, and replaced by the 11th Flying Training Wing.

== Organization ==
Shizuhama Air Base provides initial pilot flight training for the Japan Air Self Defense Force. It reports to JASDF Air Training Command, headquartered at Hamamatsu Air Base.

- 11th Flying Training Wing
  - 1st Squadron (Fuji T-7)
  - 2nd Squadron (Fuji T-7)
- Shizuhama Air Traffic Control Group
- Shizuhama Weather Group
- Shizuhama Regional Military Police Group
