= Julie Clark =

American pilot (born 1948)

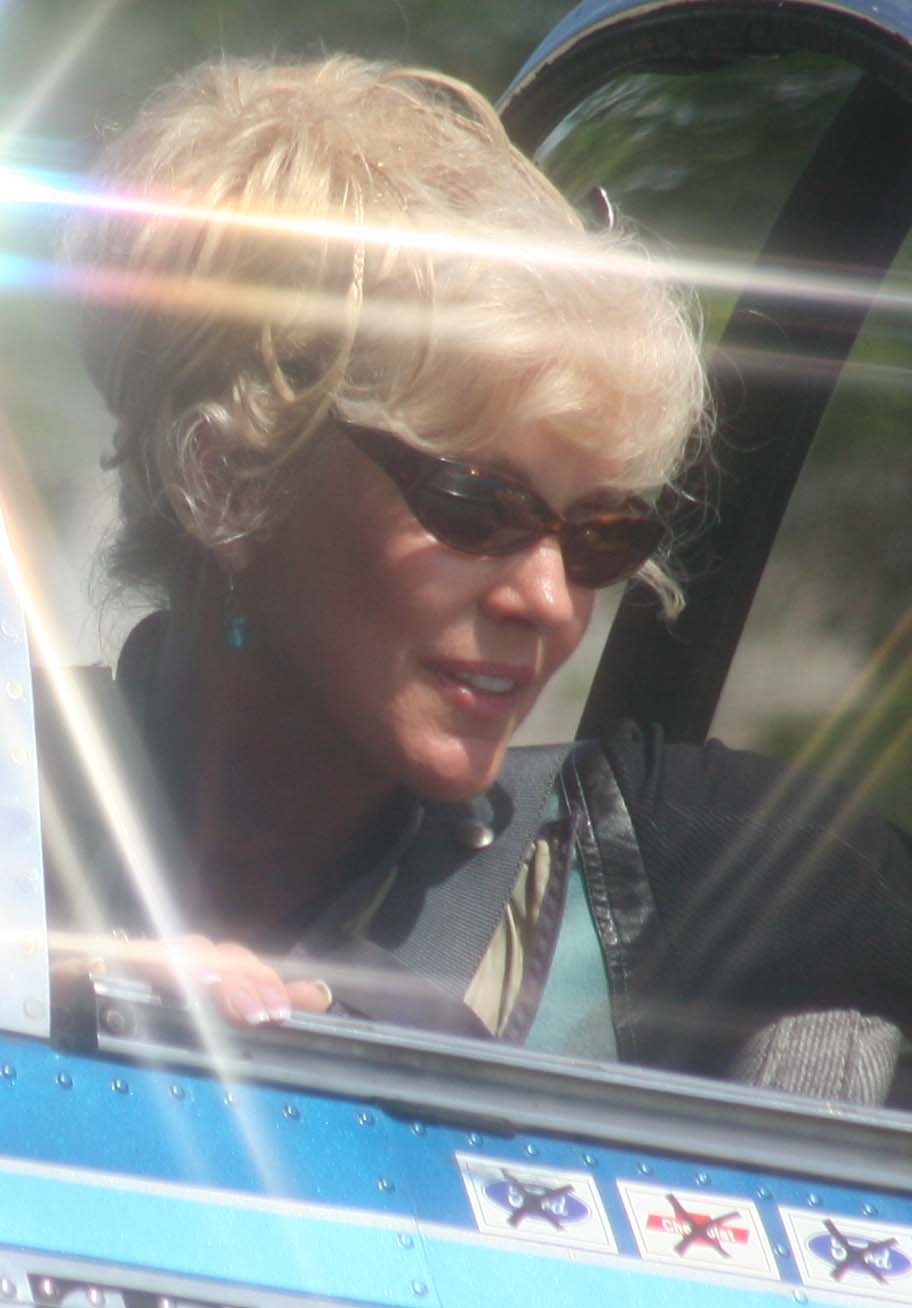
- Clark in 2006
- Born: June 27, 1948 (age 78); Hayward, California, United States
- Occupations: Airshow & commercial pilot
- Years active: 1969–2019
- Website: www.julieclarkairshows.com

Julie E. Clark (born June 27, 1948) is a retired American aerobatic air show aviator and commercial airline pilot. She started her commercial flying career with Golden West Airlines as a first officer and ended it in 2003 as a Northwest Airlines Airbus A320 Captain. She was one of the first female pilots to work for a major airline, has been voted as "Performer of the Year" several times over the years for her air show performances, and inducted into America's National Aviation Hall of Fame.

== Career ==
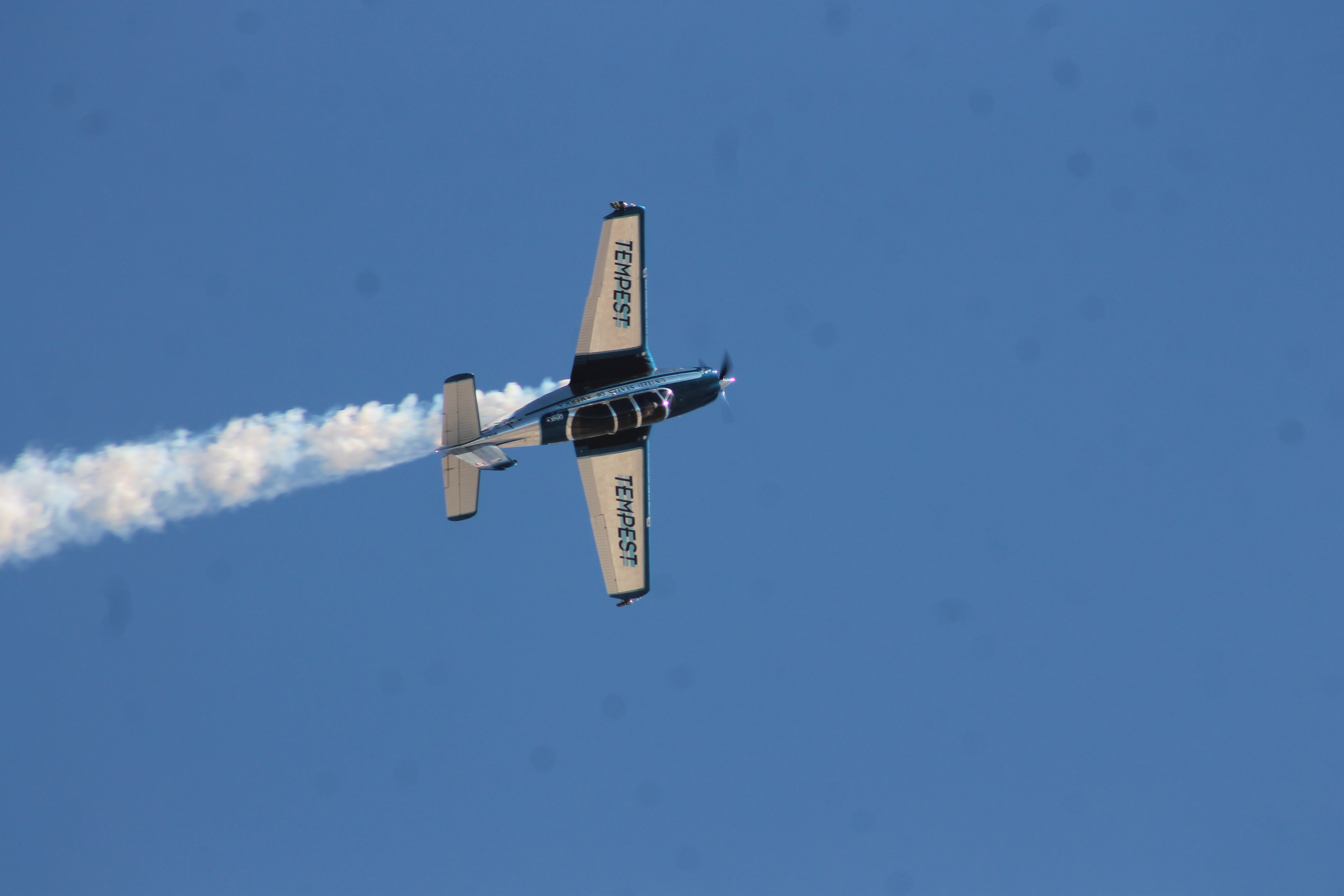
Clark in the Beechcraft T-34 "Free Spirit" at Nellis Air Force Base in 2019

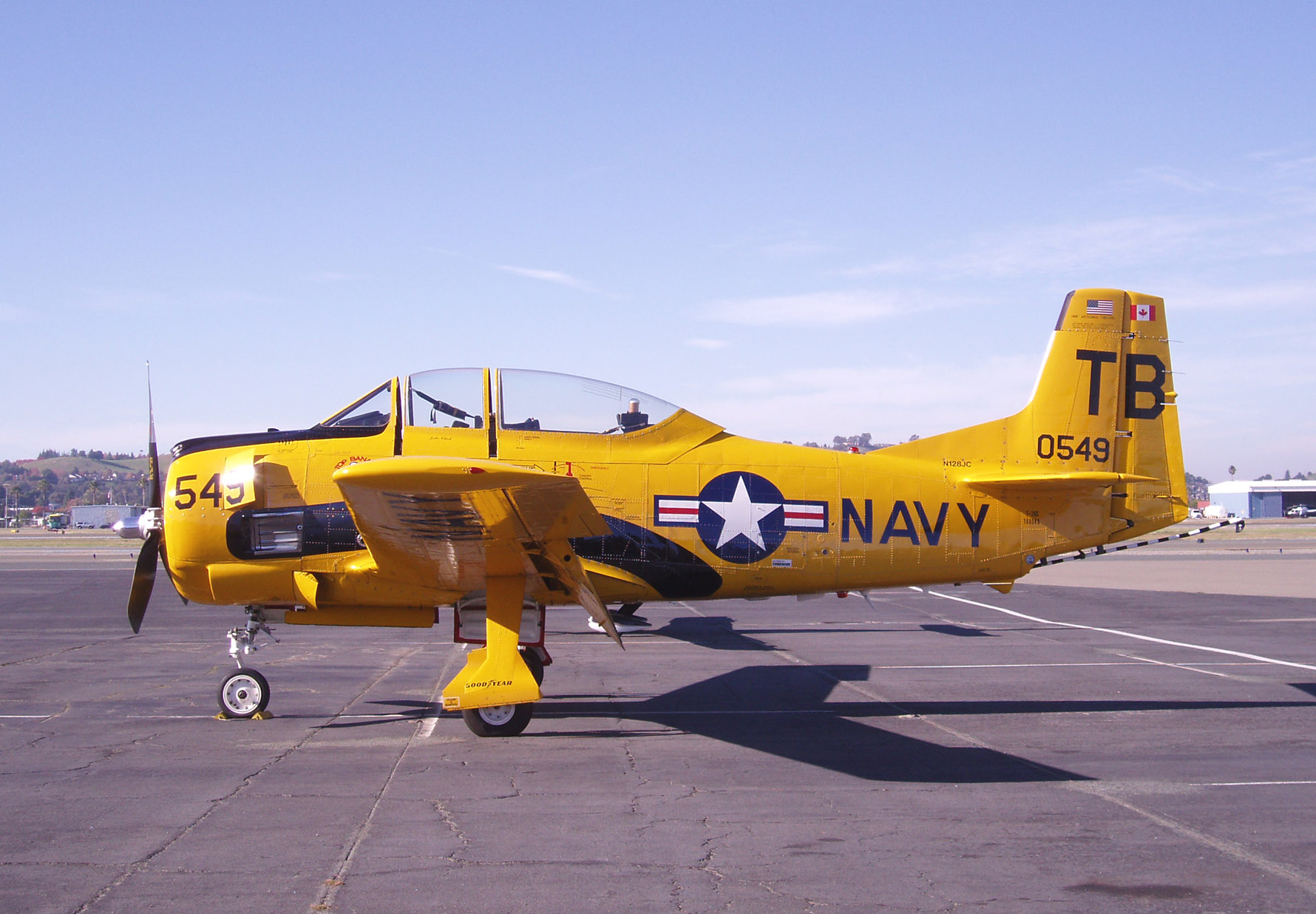
Clark's North American T-28 "Top Banana" N128JC, which she flew at airshows for over 20 years

Clark has more than 50 years of flight experience, 41 years as a solo aerobatic-air show pilot as of October 19, 2019, and 37,000 flight hours. She flew an average of 20 air shows a year in her Juice Plus-sponsored Beechcraft T-34 Mentor, and is rated in more than 66 types of aircraft. She is an enshrined member of the Living Legends of Aviation.

Clark received her pilot certificate in 1969 in San Carlos, California. She performed in the same plane from 1977 until 2019, a T-34 Mentor that she bought for $18,000 at a government surplus auction in Anchorage, Alaska. She named the plane Free Spirit, which went to the Hiller Aviation Museum when she retired.

Through her airline career, Clark went from flying the MD-80 out of Las Vegas to flying the Convair 580 out of Minneapolis for more than two decades starting in the early 1980s.

In the late 1990s, she added a North American T-28C Trojan, named Top Banana, to her aerobatics routine.

While at the 2019 EAA AirVenture Oshkosh air show, Clark announced her plans to retire, with her last performance on November 7, 2019 at Nellis Air Force Base.

=== Awards ===
- 2002, Women in Aviation International Pioneer Hall of Fame
- 2008, National Aeronautics Association (NAA)'s Katharine and Marjorie Stinson Award
- 2018, Sword of Excellence from the International Council of Air Shows
- 2019, Federal Aviation Administration's Wright Brothers Master Pilot Award
- 2020, NAA's McDonald Distinguished Statesman & Stateswoman of Aviation Award
- 2023, Katharine Wright Memorial Trophy, presented by the NAA and the Ninety-Nines
- 2025, Inducted into National Aviation Hall of Fame

== Family ==
Clark's father, Captain Ernest Clark, was also an airline pilot. He was murdered in 1964 by a suicidal passenger on Pacific Air Lines Flight 773. All crew and passengers were killed as a result of the passenger shooting both pilots, then himself, causing the plane to crash. Her mother's death just a year earlier, and her father's subsequent death, increased her determination to fly. As of 2025, Clark resides at Cameron Airpark, a "fly-in community" in Cameron Park, California.
