= Flight 261 =

Flight 261 may refer to:

- Golden West Airlines Flight 261, a mid-air collision in Whittier, California in 1975
- Thai Airways Flight 261, a crash landing in Thailand in 1998
- Alaska Airlines Flight 261, a crash into the Pacific Ocean off California in 2000
