= KFUL =

KFUL may refer to:

- Fullerton Municipal Airport (ICAO code KFUL)
- KFUL-LD, a low-power television station (channel 23, virtual 57) licensed to serve San Luis Obispo, California, United States
