= Aeronca Sedan =

1948 American light aircraft

15AC Sedan
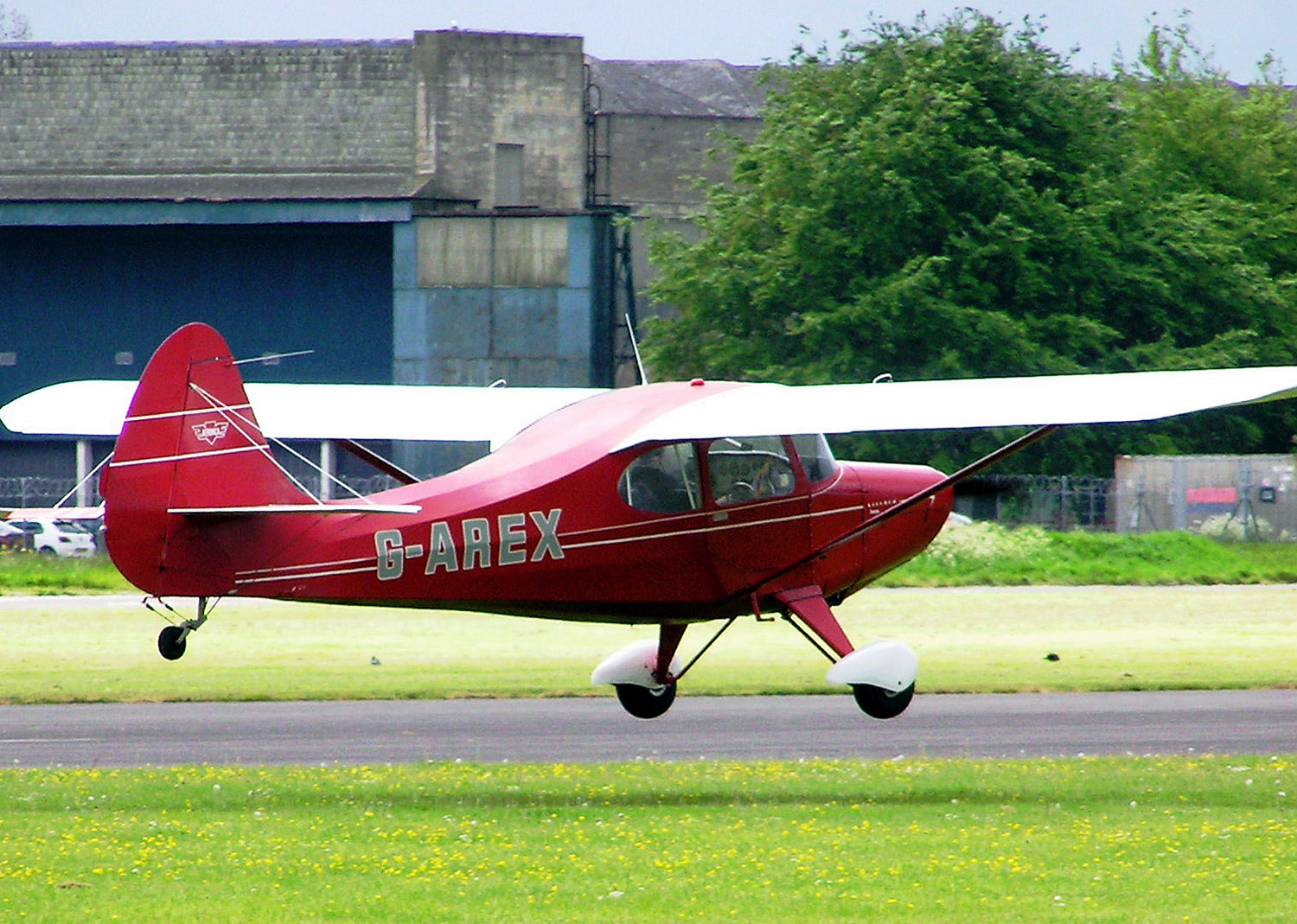

General information
- Type: Light utility aircraft
- Manufacturer: Aeronca Aircraft
- Status: Production completed
- Number built: 561

History
- Manufactured: 1948–1951
- Introduction date: 1947
- First flight: 1947

The Aeronca 15AC Sedan is a four-seat, fixed conventional gear light airplane produced by Aeronca Aircraft between 1948 and 1951. Designed for personal use, the Sedan also found usage in utility roles like bush flying. The Sedan was the last design that Aeronca put into production and was the largest aircraft produced by the company.

== Design and development ==
Like those of other Aeronca designs, the Sedan's fuselage and tail surfaces are constructed of welded metal tubing. The outer shape of the fuselage is created by a combination of wooden formers and longerons, covered with fabric. The cross-section of the metal fuselage truss is triangular, a design feature which can be traced back to the earliest Aeronca C-2 design of the late 1920s.

In a significant design departure from previous Aeronca aircraft, the strut-braced wings of the Sedan are all-metal assemblies. Such combinations of construction types were not common. While the Sedan mated a fabric-covered fuselage to all-metal wings, the contemporary Cessna 170 mated an all-metal fuselage to fabric-covered wings. Also unique to the Sedan, among Aeronca designs, are the single-piece wing struts.

The landing gear of the Sedan is in a conventional arrangement, with steel tube main gear, and a steerable tailwheel. Unlike its siblings the Champ and Chief, both of which employ oleo struts for shock absorption, the Sedan makes used of bungee cords to absorb landing and taxi loads.

The Sedan is powered by the Continental C-145-2 or Continental O-300-A engine of 145 horsepower (108 kW); the Franklin 6A4-165-B3 and Franklin 6A4-150-B3, of 165 and 150 horsepower (110 kW), respectively, are also approved for installation. The Sedan features an electrical system, including a starter, as standard equipment.

As it had with many of its other models, Aeronca certified a seaplane version of the Sedan, the model S15AC. While the standard Sedan was equipped with a single entry door on the right side, the seaplane version offered a left-side door as well.

=== Modifications ===
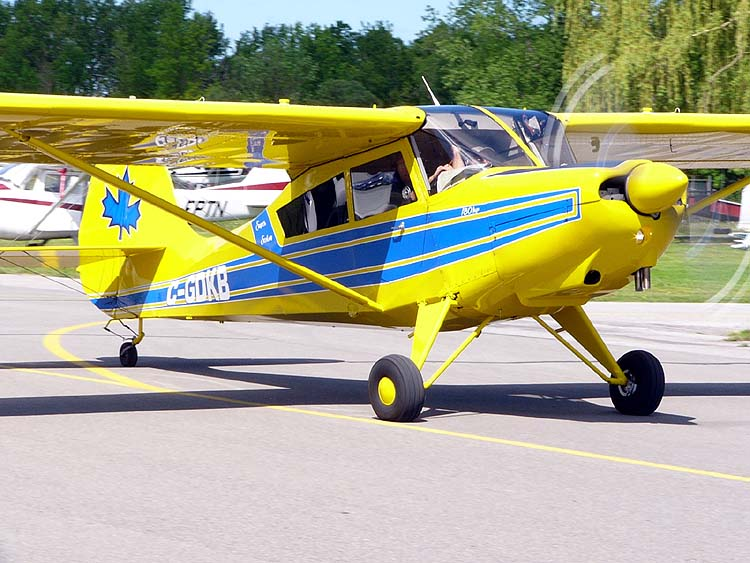
Modernized Sedan with 180 horsepower (130 kW) Lycoming O-360 engine

More than 50 Supplemental Type Certificate modifications are available for the Sedan, many of these intended to modernize the aircraft. One, sold by the current owner of the Sedan design, replaces many of the components ahead of the firewall with updated versions, including a Lycoming O-360-A1A engine of 180 horsepower (130 kW), a constant speed propeller, a new engine mount, and a fiberglass cowling. A second modification from the design holder allows the removal of the oil cooler, which can break and for which there are no replacements available.

=== Production history ===
Entering production in 1948, the 15AC Sedan was Aeronca's four-seat addition to its pair of two-seat airplanes, the Champ and Chief, both of which had entered production in 1946. The four-place design gave Aeronca a lineup similar to that of its competitors. Many other companies with two-place designs had been adding four-place versions. Among these four-place competitors were the Cessna 170, PA-14 Family Cruiser, Stinson 108, Taylorcraft 15 and the Luscombe 11A Silvaire Sedan.

The Aeronca Sedan was produced from 1948 until 1951, when Aeronca ceased all production of light aircraft. The Sedan production line shut down in 1950, but Sedans were still being assembled in 1951 from the remaining stock of parts. The last Sedan, which was also the last Aeronca-built airplane to fly, left the factory on October 23, 1951.

Though Aeronca sold a number of its other designs after ceasing production, the company long maintained ownership of the Sedan. The HAOP-27 Krishak, built by Hindustan Aeronautics, shows some similarities to the Sedan. Some sources say that the Krishak was produced under license from Aeronca, though the differences are significant enough to call this into question.

Aeronca finally parted with the design on 11 April 1991, selling it to (according to Federal Aviation Administration records) “William Brad Mitchell or Sandra Mitchell”. On 10 July 2000, ownership of the design passed to Burl A. Rogers, owner of Burl's Aircraft of Chugiak, Alaska. Since 2000 Burl's Aircraft has provided parts and technical support to Sedan owners and operators.

=== Burl's Aircraft production ===
On February 21, 2008, Burl's Aircraft announced that the company was building new Sedan fuselages and a new style fuel valve. On December 8, 2009, Burl's Aircraft announced that they were commencing building new 15AC Sedans.

Since Aeronca still exists, but no longer holds the type certificate, the new production aircraft will be marketed by Burl A. Rogers and Burl's Aircraft LLC as the Rogers 15AC Sedan.

== Operational history ==
The Sedan was designed to be a docile airplane but also a good performer. Pilots found that the Sedan, with its large interior, had plenty of room for baggage and passengers. With its large wing, it had good takeoff performance, and was capable of short takeoff and landing operations. It found a niche as a personal aircraft and in commercial bush flying roles; it could also be equipped for agricultural work. Though the commercial roles have been largely taken over by more modern designs, many Sedans remain in use as personal airplanes. Their ongoing operation is aided by the availability of support from the design owner.

=== Record flights ===
A Sedan was chosen by pilots Bill Barris and Dick Riedel for their attempt to set a time aloft record in 1949. Their flight was sponsored by the local chamber of commerce and the Sunkist growers association, the second sponsor accounting for the naming of the aircraft as the Sunkist Lady. (The accompanying support aircraft, also a Sedan, was called the Lady’s Maid.) Departing from the Fullerton, California, Municipal Airport on March 15, the flight crossed the United States to Miami, Florida, where bad weather forced the pilots to circle for 14 days before making the return trip to Fullerton. Along the way, fuel and food were passed from vehicles on the ground to the pilots during low passes over airport runways. Having reached Fullerton on April 11, the pilots kept flying around the local area until April 26, finally landing at Fullerton Municipal Airport and setting a record of over 1,008 hours, or 42 days, in the air.

The Fullerton record was short lived. Inspired by the flight at Fullerton, later in 1949, Yuma, Arizona, decided to sponsor its own time aloft record attempt. The city needed publicity as it was experiencing economic hard times due to the 1946 closure of Yuma Army Air Field. Pilots Woody Jongeward and Bob Woodhouse piloted the City of Yuma, a Sedan borrowed from local owners, modified for the flight and painted with the slogan, “The City with a Future.” The flight began on August 24, with the aircraft remaining in the Yuma area throughout, and ended after more than 1,124 hours, or nearly 47 days in the air, on October 10. In 1997, the record-setting airplane was located and returned to Yuma; made airworthy again, it flew on October 10, 1999, to commemorate the 50th anniversary of the end of the record flight. The "City of Yuma" airplane and the refueling car are now on display at City Hall in Yuma.

== Variants ==
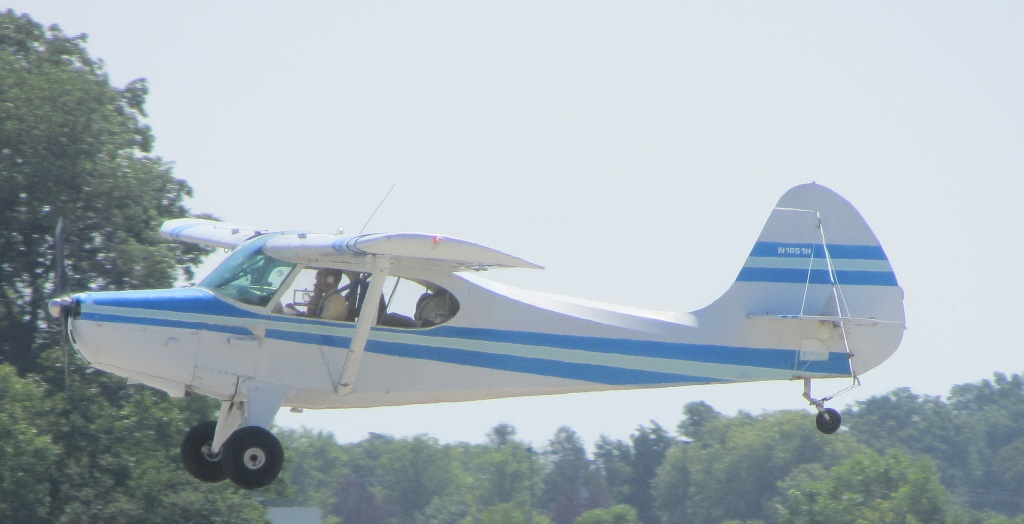
Aeronca AC sedan landing

Aeronca 15AC Sedan
Basic model, certified 23 September 1948 and produced 1948–1951. Specified engines are Continental C-145-2 or Continental O-300-A and Franklin 6A4-165-B3 or Franklin 6A4-150-B3 under a Maine Air Service Franklin Aeronca Conversion Kit.
Aeronca S15AC Sedan
Seaplane model, certified 23 September 1948. Same as the model 15AC except for float installation, larger elevator trim tab and fuselage reinforcements
Rogers 15AC Sedan
Proposed new version for production commencing 2010. The prototype aircraft, under construction in December 2009, will be equipped with Lycoming O-360-A1A 180 hp (134 kW) engine, 80 in (203 cm) constant speed propeller, vertically-arranged instrument panel, extended baggage compartment, large windows, dual seaplane-style doors, lightweight battery, starter, alternator and a 3200 series Alaskan Bushwheel tail wheel with a Pawnee-style tailwheel spring.

== Specifications (15AC Sedan) ==
Data from Jane's All the World's Aircraft 1951–52

General characteristics

- Crew: 1
- Capacity: 3 passengers
- Length: 25 ft 3 in (7.70 m)
- Wingspan: 37 ft 6 in (11.43 m)
- Height: 7 ft 0 in (2.13 m)
- Wing area: 200 sq ft (18.6 m^{2})
- Airfoil: NACA 4412
- Empty weight: 1,150 lb (522 kg)
- Gross weight: 2,050 lb (930 kg)
- Fuel capacity: 40 US gal (33 imp gal; 150 L)
- Powerplant: 1 × Continental C-145 six-cylinder horizontally-opposed air cooled engine, 145 hp (108 kW)

Performance

- Maximum speed: 129 mph (208 km/h, 112 kn)
- Cruise speed: 114 mph (183 km/h, 99 kn) at sea level (75% power)
- Stall speed: 53 mph (85 km/h, 46 kn) (power off)
- Range: 456 mi (734 km, 396 nmi)
- Service ceiling: 12,400 ft (3,800 m)
- Rate of climb: 800 ft/min (4.06 m/s)

== See also ==
Aircraft of comparable role, configuration, and era

- Cessna 170
- Piper PA-14 Family Cruiser
- Piper PA-20 Pacer
- Stinson 108
- Yakovlev Yak-12
