= Lima Lima Flight Team =

American aerobatic team

The Lima Lima Flight Team is a precision formation flying demonstration team based in Naperville, Illinois. They perform flyovers and airshows for many local events in Illinois and nearby states, such as the Gary Air Show in Gary, Indiana. The flight team uses vintage Beechcraft T-34 Mentors.

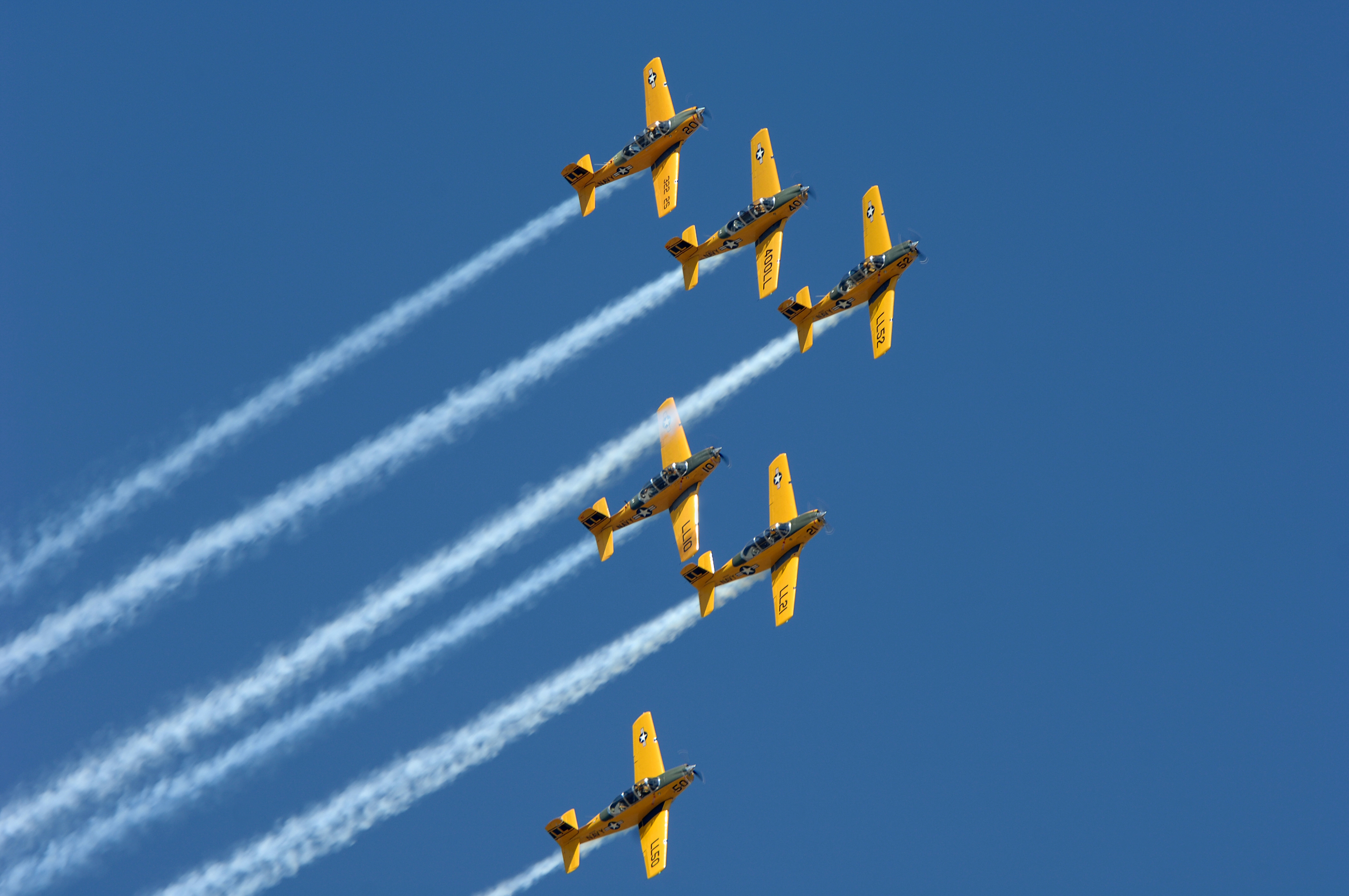
Lima Lima Flight team performing at Thunder over Louisville, April 2009.

The name derives from the FAA identifier of the field where the team originated. Naper Aero Club (LL-10) is located in the western suburbs of Chicago. It is an airport community, with 100 homes connected to its two runways via taxiways behind the homes. The original flying club (Mentor Flyers, Inc.) which spawned the Lima Lima team is still based at LL-10, but most of the original pilots have moved on and been replaced with newer members.
