= Beechcraft T-34 Mentor =

American plane used for military training

T-34 Mentor
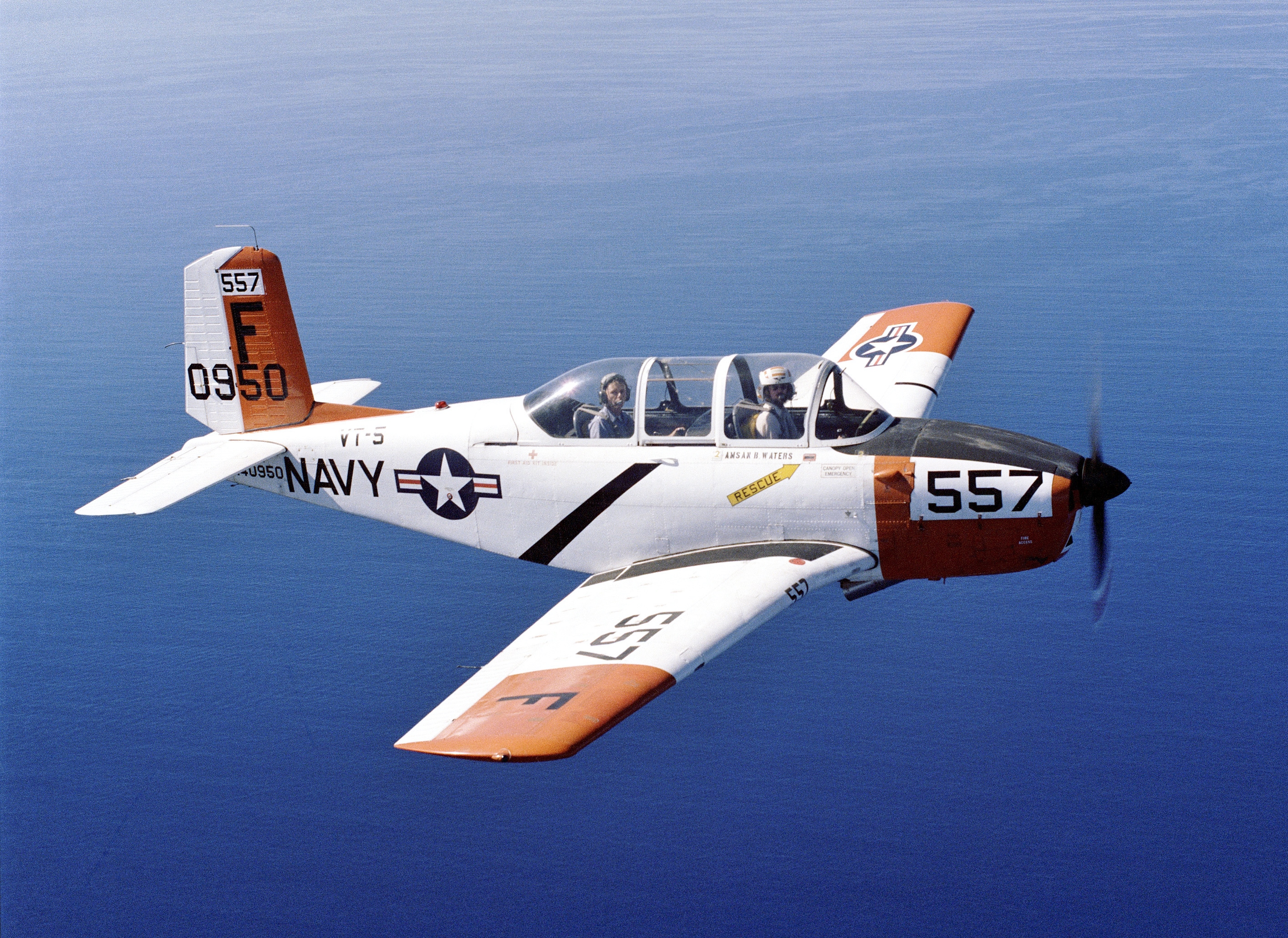
- A T-34B Mentor aircraft from Training Squadron 5 (VT-5) in 1976

General information
- Type: Trainer aircraft
- National origin: United States
- Manufacturer: Beechcraft
- Primary users: United States Air Force United States Navy; Japan Air Self-Defense Force; Republic of China Air Force
- Number built: 2,300+

History
- Manufactured: 1953–1959; 1975–1990
- Introduction date: 1953
- First flight: 2 December 1948
- Developed from: Beechcraft Bonanza
- Developed into: Fuji LM-1 Nikko

The Beechcraft T-34 Mentor is an American propeller-driven, single-engined, military trainer aircraft derived from the Beechcraft Model 35 Bonanza. The earlier versions of the T-34, dating from around the late 1940s to the 1950s, were piston-engined. These were eventually succeeded by the upgraded T-34C Turbo-Mentor, powered by a turboprop engine. The T-34 remains in service more than seven decades after it was first designed.

== Design and development ==
The T-34 was the brainchild of Walter Beech, who developed it as the Beechcraft Model 45 private venture at a time when there was no defense budget for a new trainer model. Beech hoped to sell it as an economical alternative to the North American T-6/SNJ Texan, then in use by all services of the U.S. military.

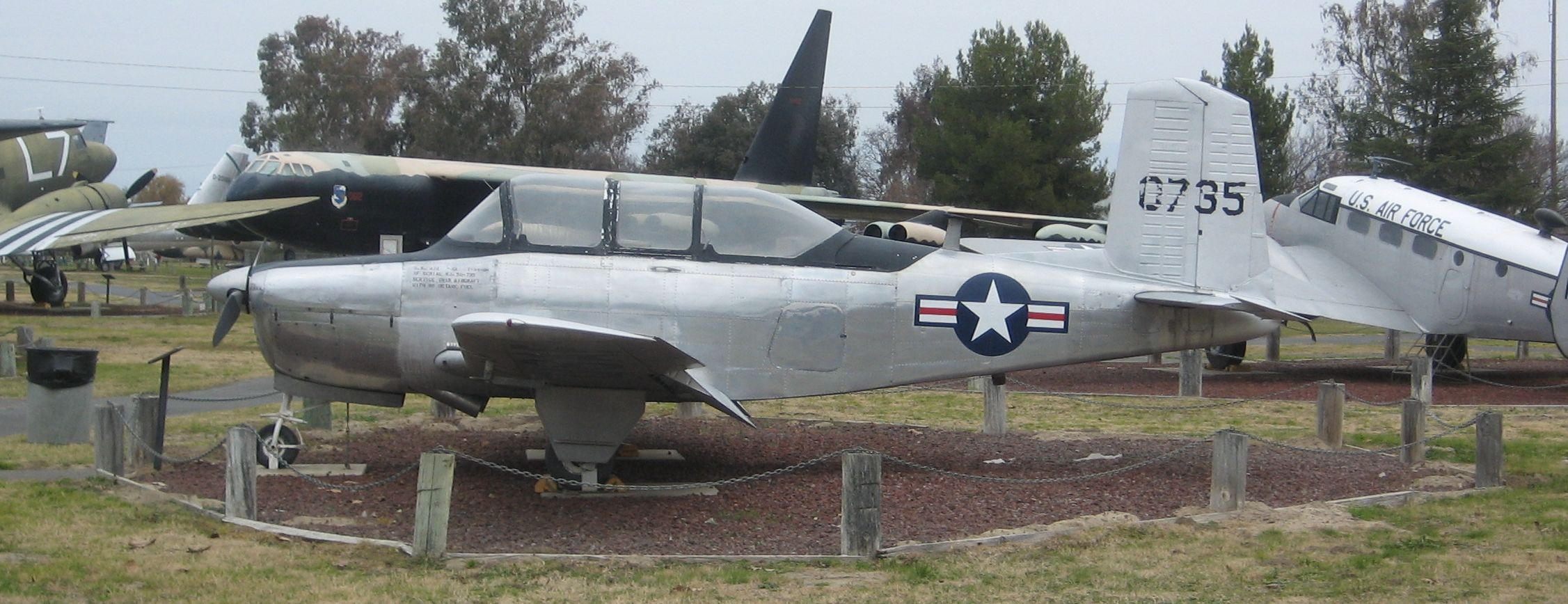
A YT-34 on display at the Castle Air Museum at the former Castle AFB in Atwater, California

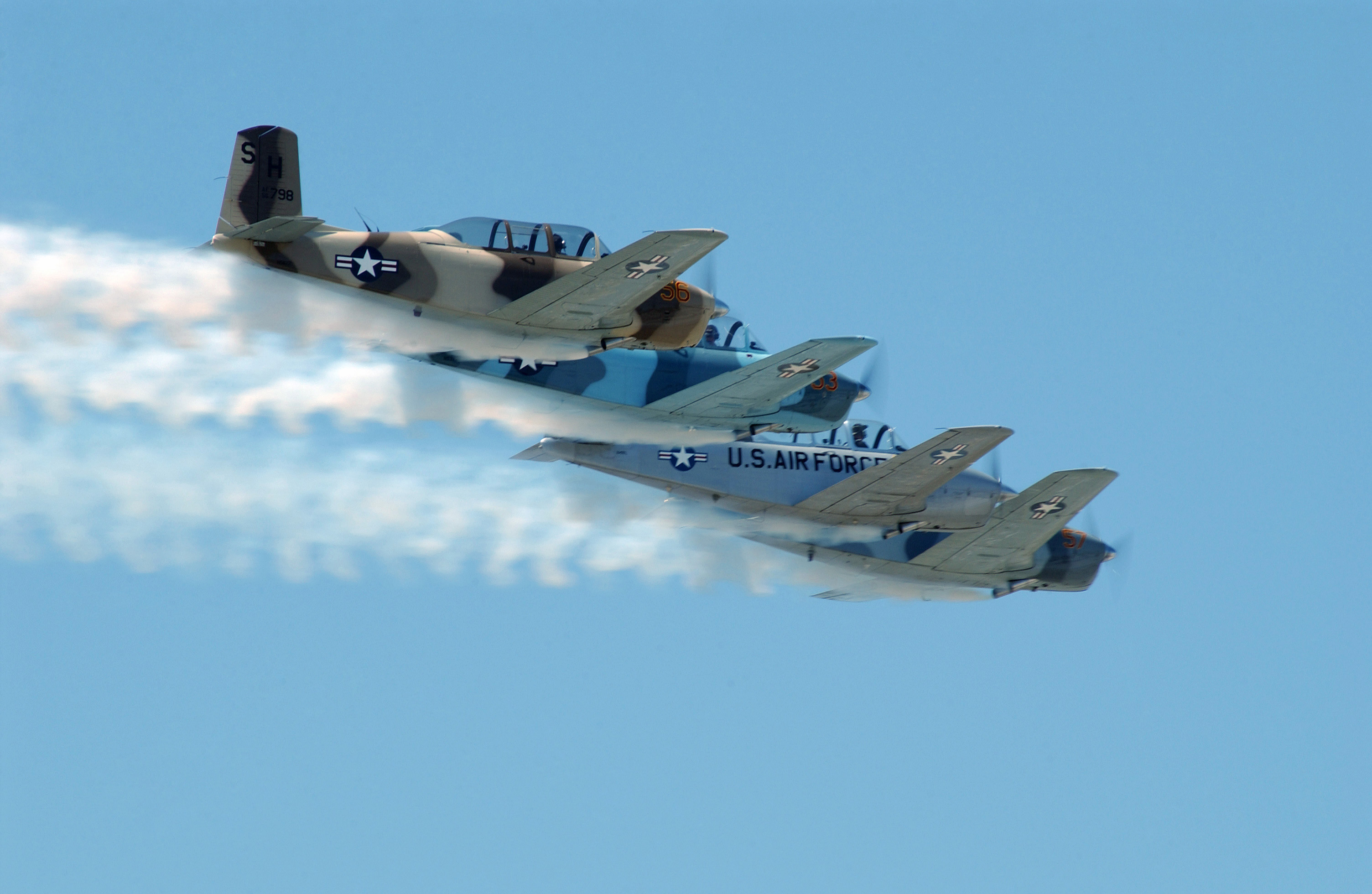
T-34s of the March Field Aero Club at March Air Reserve Base, California, in 2004

Three initial design concepts were developed for the Model 45, including one with the Bonanza's signature V-tail, but the final design that emerged in 1948 incorporated conventional tail control surfaces for the benefit of the more conservative military (featuring a relatively large unswept vertical fin that would find its way onto the Travel Air twin-engine civil aircraft almost ten years later). The Bonanza's fuselage with four-passenger cabin was replaced with a narrower fuselage incorporating a two-seater tandem cockpit and bubble canopy, which provided greater visibility for the trainee pilot and flight instructor. Structurally, the Model 45 was much stronger than the Bonanza, being designed for +10g and −4.5g, while the Continental E-185 engine of 185 horsepower (hp) at takeoff (less than a third of the power of the T-6's engine) was the same as that fitted to contemporary Bonanzas.

Following the prototype were three Model A45T aircraft, the first two with the same engine as the prototype and the third with a Continental E-225, which would prove to be close to the production version. Production did not begin until 1953, when Beechcraft began delivering T-34As to the United States Air Force (USAF) and similar Model B45 aircraft for export. Production of the T-34B for the United States Navy (USN) began in 1955, this version featuring a number of changes reflecting the different requirements of the two services. The T-34B had only differential braking for steering control on the ground instead of nosewheel steering, additional wing dihedral and, to cater for the different heights of pilots, adjustable rudder pedals instead of the moveable seats of the T-34A. T-34A production was completed in 1956, with T-34Bs being built until October 1957 and licensed B45 versions built in Canada (125 manufactured by Canadian Car and Foundry), Japan (173 built by Fuji Heavy Industries), and Argentina (75 by FMA) until 1958. Beechcraft delivered the last Model B45s in 1959. Total production of the Continental-engined versions in the US and abroad was 1,904 aircraft.

=== Model 73 Jet Mentor ===
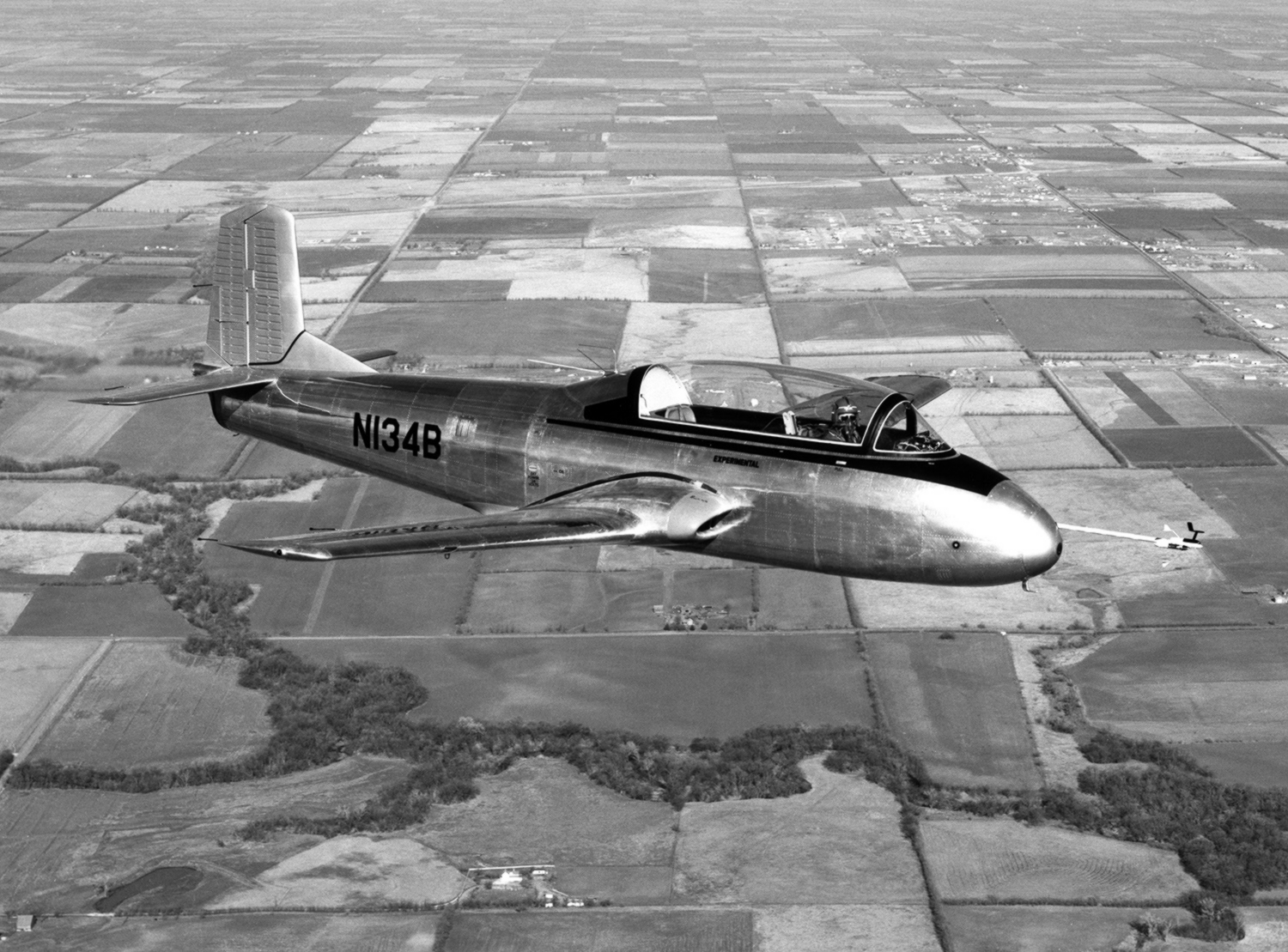
The Model 73 Jet Mentor.

In 1955, Beechcraft developed a jet-engined derivative, again as a private venture, and again in the hope of winning a contract from the US military. The Model 73 Jet Mentor shared many components with the piston-engined aircraft; major visual differences were the redesigned cockpit which was moved forward in the fuselage and the air intakes for the jet engine in the wing roots, supplying air to a single 920 lbf (4.1 kN) Continental J69 jet engine in the rear fuselage. The first flight of the Model 73, registered N134B, was on 18 December 1955. The Model 73 was evaluated by the US Air Force, which ordered the Cessna T-37, and the US Navy, which decided upon the Temco TT Pinto. After initial testing at the Naval Air Test Center at NAS Patuxent River, Maryland, the Navy tested the feasibility of using the TT Pinto as a jet-powered trainer for primary flight training in 1959, but discontinued use of the aircraft by December 1960 and discarded all examples, returning to the piston-powered T-34B Mentor and North American T-28 Trojan for its primary flight training requirements. The Beechcraft Model 73 was not put into production and the sole prototype is displayed at the Kansas Aviation Museum.

=== T-34C Turbo-Mentor ===
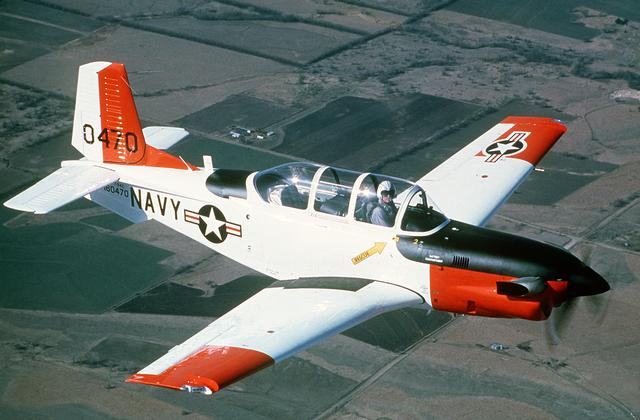
A T-34C Turbo-Mentor, which can be distinguished from the B (piston) model by the extended nose and exhaust stacks on either side behind the prop to accommodate the turboprop engine

After a production hiatus of almost 15 years, the T-34C Turbo-Mentor powered by a Pratt & Whitney Canada PT6A-25 turboprop engine was developed in 1973. The original T-34's modified Bonanza/Debonair-style wing was replaced with a variant of the larger Beech Baron wing, and the original Bonanza/Debonair-style landing gear was replaced with the landing gear from the even-larger Beech Duke.

Development proceeded at the behest of the US Navy, which supplied two T-34Bs for conversion. After re-engining with the PT6, the two aircraft were redesignated as YT-34Cs, the first of these flying with turboprop power for the first time on 21 September 1973. Mentor production restarted in 1975 for deliveries of T-34Cs to the Navy and of the T-34C-1 armed version for export customers in 1977, this version featuring four underwing hardpoints. The last Turbo-Mentor rolled off the production line in 1990.

Since the late 1970s, T-34Cs have been used by the Naval Air Training Command to train numerous Naval Aviators and Naval Flight Officers for the U.S. Navy, U.S. Marine Corps, U.S. Coast Guard, and numerous NATO and Allied nations. With over 35 years of service, the T-34C has been completely replaced by the T-6 Texan II.

== Operational history ==
=== U.S. Air Force and Civil Air Patrol ===
The first flight of the Model 45 was on 2 December 1948, by Beechcraft test pilot Vern Carstens. In 1950, the USAF ordered three Model A45T test aircraft, which were given the military designation YT-34. A long competition followed to determine a new trainer, and in 1953 the Air Force put the Model 45 into service as the T-34A Mentor, while the USN followed in May 1955 with the T-34B.

After extensive testing, the USAF ordered the Mentor into production as the T-34A in early 1953. The first production T-34A was delivered to Edwards Air Force Base, California, in October 1953 for evaluation, and deliveries to the Air Training Command (ATC) began in 1954. The T-34A commenced service as USAF's initial primary flight trainer at "contract" pilot training air bases across the southern United States, replacing extant North American AT-6 Texan trainers. Following training in the T-34A, USAF pilot trainees would advance to the North American T-28A Trojan for intermediate training.

The T-34A Mentor remained the standard USAF primary trainer until the introduction of the Cessna T-37 Tweet jet trainer in the late 1950s, replacing both the T-34A and T-28A. This also coincided with ATC's implementation of the Undergraduate Pilot Training (UPT) syllabus at various air force bases in the United States under ATC claimancy and phaseout and closure of the contract pilot training air bases. As they were replaced by T-37s, many T-34As were turned over to USAF aero clubs at air force bases in the United States and USAF air bases overseas. In all, the USAF acquired 450 T-34As.

When the U.S. Air Force replaced the last of their T-34As at the beginning of the 1960s (their role taken over by the propeller-driven T-41 Mescalero and the T-37 Tweet primary jet trainer in UPT), T-34As not allocated to USAF aero clubs or marked for foreign military sale/transfer were turned over to the USAF Auxiliary, the Civil Air Patrol, for use as search and rescue aircraft. However, the T-34A's low-wing design limited its utility in an aerial search and rescue role. Compounded with maintenance issues, particularly expensive wing spar repairs that became apparent between 1999 and 2005, the last of the former USAF T-34As were withdrawn from CAP service in 2003.

=== U.S. Navy and U.S. Marine Corps ===
The U.S. Navy kept the T-34B operational as a Naval Air Training Command initial primary trainer at the former Naval Air Station Saufley Field, Florida until the mid-1970s and as a Navy Recruiting Command aircraft until the early 1990s when the last examples were retired as an economy move. Others continue to remain under U.S. Navy control as part of flying clubs at Naval Air Stations and Marine Corps Air Stations.

Beginning in 1975, the turbine-powered T-34C Turbomentor was introduced as the Navy's new primary flight trainer for Student Naval Aviators, and began replacing the North American T-28 Trojan with training air wings at NAS Whiting Field, Florida and NAS Corpus Christi, Texas. In the mid-1980s, it also commenced service as a basic trainer for Student Naval Flight Officers at NAS Pensacola, Florida.

The T-34C is no longer used as a primary training aircraft for U.S. Navy, U.S. Marine Corps and U.S. Coast Guard Student Naval Aviators and various NATO/Allied/Coalition student pilots training under U.S. Navy auspices. It has been replaced by the T-6 Texan II. Training Squadron TWENTY-EIGHT at NAS Corpus Christi's Training Air Wing FOUR was the last to retire the T-34C as a Naval Primary Training Aircraft according to the Chief of Naval Aviation Training (CNATRA) Public Affairs Office (PAO), joining Training Air Wing SIX at NAS Pensacola, Training Air Wing FIVE at NAS Whiting Field and Training Air Wing FOUR's Training Squadron TWENTY-SEVEN at NAS Corpus Christi that had already transitioned to the T-6A and T-6B models.

Several other T-34Cs also remain in service with the Naval Air Test Center at NAS Patuxent River, Maryland and as aerial spotter aircraft with F/A-18 Fleet Replacement Squadrons (FRS) and Strike Fighter Weapons and Tactics Schools at NAS Oceana, Virginia; NAS Lemoore, California; and MCAS Miramar, California; and the Naval Strike and Air Warfare Center (NSAWC) at NAS Fallon, Nevada.

=== U.S. Army ===
Some time before 1990, the United States Army received six ex-U.S. Navy T-34C, used as test platforms and chase planes at Edwards Air Force Base, California and Fort Bragg, North Carolina.

=== NASA ===
NASA Armstrong Flight Research Center (formerly the Dryden Flight Research Center) at Edwards, California has operated two T-34C aircraft. The first aircraft was previously flown at the Glenn Research Center in Cleveland, Ohio, where it was used for propulsion experiments involving turboprop engines. In 1996 this aircraft was moved Dryden as a chase aircraft. That aircraft was returned to the U.S. Navy in 2002. The second T-34C was obtained in early 2005 from the Naval Air Warfare Center Aircraft Division (NAWCAD) at NAS Patuxent River, where it was due to be retired. At Armstrong, the T-34C is primarily used for chasing remotely piloted unmanned air vehicles which fly slower than NASA's F/A-18 mission support aircraft can fly. As a NASA mission support chase plane, the back seat would be occupied by a photographer or flight test engineer during research missions. It is also used for required pilot proficiency flying.

=== Non-U.S. military service ===
As of 2007, Mentors were still used by several air forces and navies.

From 1978, the T-34C Turbo-Mentor was the Argentine Naval Aviation basic trainer used by the 1st Naval Aviation Force (Training), alongside 15 T-34C-1 light attack aircraft forming the Fourth Naval Air Attack Squadron. During the 1982 Falklands War, four T-34C-1s were deployed to Port Stanley on 25 April 1982, primarily to be employed in a reconnaissance role. The main encounter with British forces occurred on 1 May 1982 when three Turbo-Mentors attacked a Royal Navy Westland Sea King helicopter in the area of Berkeley Sound but were intercepted by Royal Navy Sea Harriers flown by Lt 'Soapy' Watson and Lt Cdr 'Sharky' Ward of 801 Naval Air Squadron flying from HMS Invincible, with one of the T-34Cs being damaged by cannon fire from Ward's aircraft. The four T-34C-1 Turbo-Mentors continued to operate, flying a few reconnaissance missions, but were redeployed to Borbon Station where they were ultimately destroyed by the SAS Raid on Pebble Island on 15 May 1982. Although all four hulks remained on the island for a considerable length of time, eventually, 0729/(1-A)411 was recovered on 10 June 1983 and stored for future display at the Fleet Air Arm Museum.

=== Civilian use ===
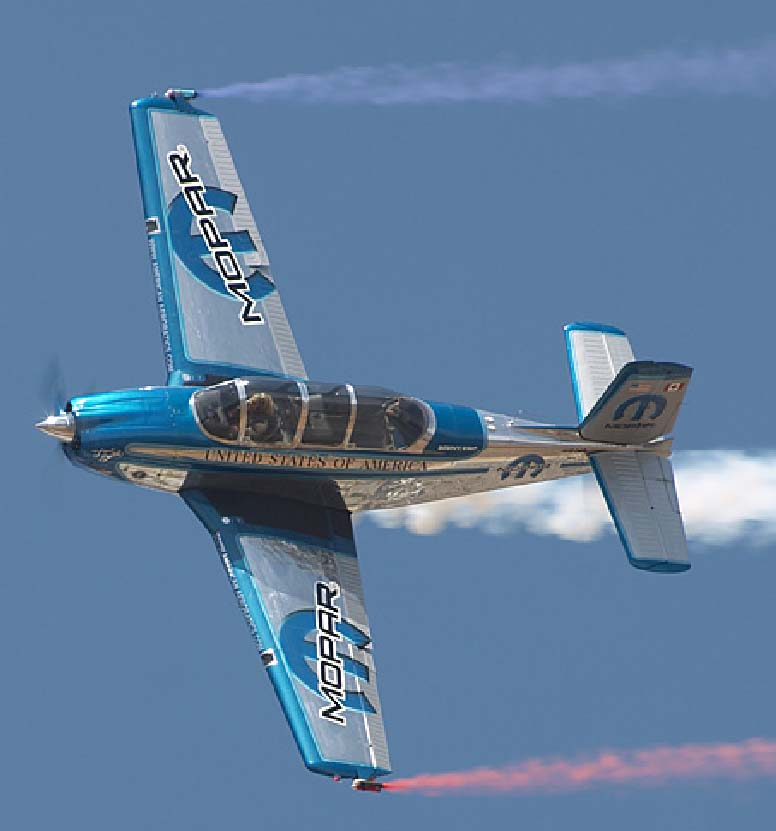
Julie Clark in the T-34 "Free Spirit" c. 2006

In 2004, due to a series of crashes involving in-flight structural failure during simulated combat flights, the entire US civilian fleet of T-34A/Bs was grounded by the Federal Aviation Administration. The grounding has since been eased to a slate of restrictions on the permitted flight envelope. Via a series of Airworthiness Directives (ADs) established by or Alternate Methods of Compliance (AMOCs) negotiated with the FAA, including installation of certain, approved structural modifications to the wing spar and other repairs, the T-34A and T-34B fleet in 2011 has been restored to full flight status by FAA at the Mentor's originally designed limitations, provided each individual example is compliant with those ADs and AMOCs.

The Mentor is the aircraft used by the Lima Lima Flight Team and Dragon Flight, both civilian demonstration teams. It was also used by aerobatic pilot Julie Clark, who flew her T-34 "Free Spirit" (registration N134JC) at air shows.

In 2024, Apollo 8 lunar module pilot Bill Anders was killed in a crash near the US-Canada border while flying a T-34.

== Variants ==
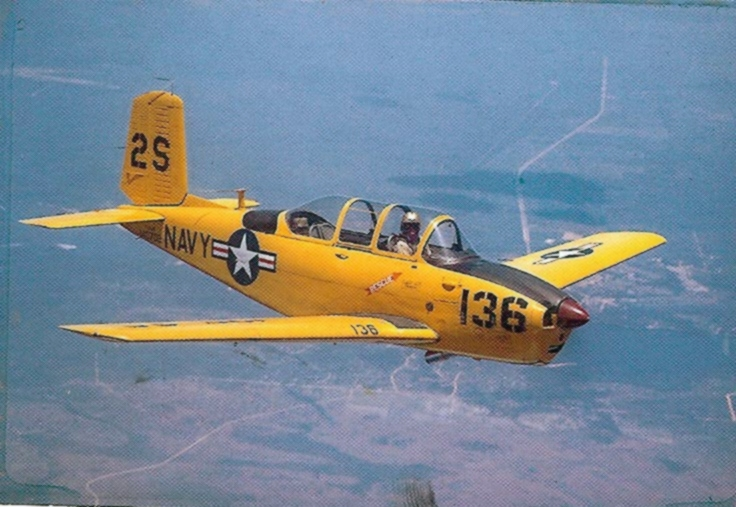
A U.S. Navy T-34B assigned to NAS Saufley Field in the 1950s.

YT-34
Prototype, three built.
T-34A
US Air Force trainer. Replaced by the Cessna T-37 around 1960 (450 built).
T-34B
US Navy trainer. Used as a trainer until 1976, when VT-1 and VT-5 were decommissioned. It was replaced by the T-34C (423 built by Beechcraft). T-34Bs were flown by pilots assigned to the Navy Recruiting Command until the mid-1990s.
YT-34C
Two T-34Bs were fitted with turboprop engines, and were used as T-34C prototypes.
T-34C Turbo-Mentor

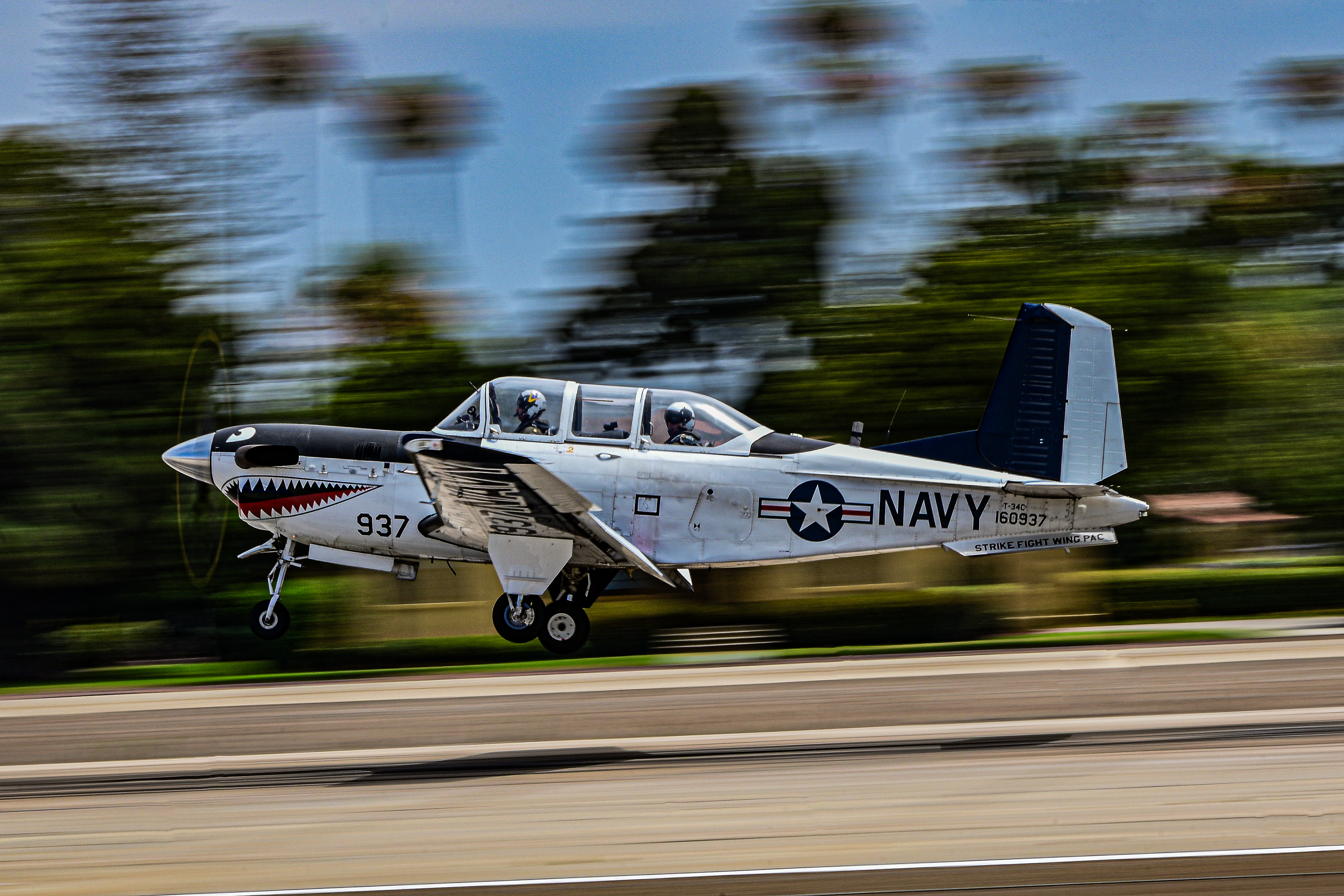
U.S. Navy T-34C Turbo Mentor lands at Naval Air Station North Island on July 1st, 2026

Two-seat primary trainer, fitted with a turboprop engine.
T-34C-1
Equipped with hardpoints for training or light attack, able to carry 1,200 lb (540 kg) of weapons on four underwing pylons. The armament could include flares, incendiary bombs, rocket or gun pods and antitank missiles. Widely exported.
Turbine-Mentor 34C
A civil variant introduced -- not, it seems, in search of private buyers, but for governmental sales where a military type was undesireable. Six were sold to the Algerian national pilot training school in 1979.
Allison Turbine Mentor
Conversion of surplus T-34 Mentors to be powered by Allison Model 250 turboprop engines.
Model 73 Jet Mentor
Powered by a 920 lbf (4.09 kN) Continental J69-T-9 turbojet engine. The sole aircraft first flew on 18 December 1955.

== Operators ==
=== Military operators ===
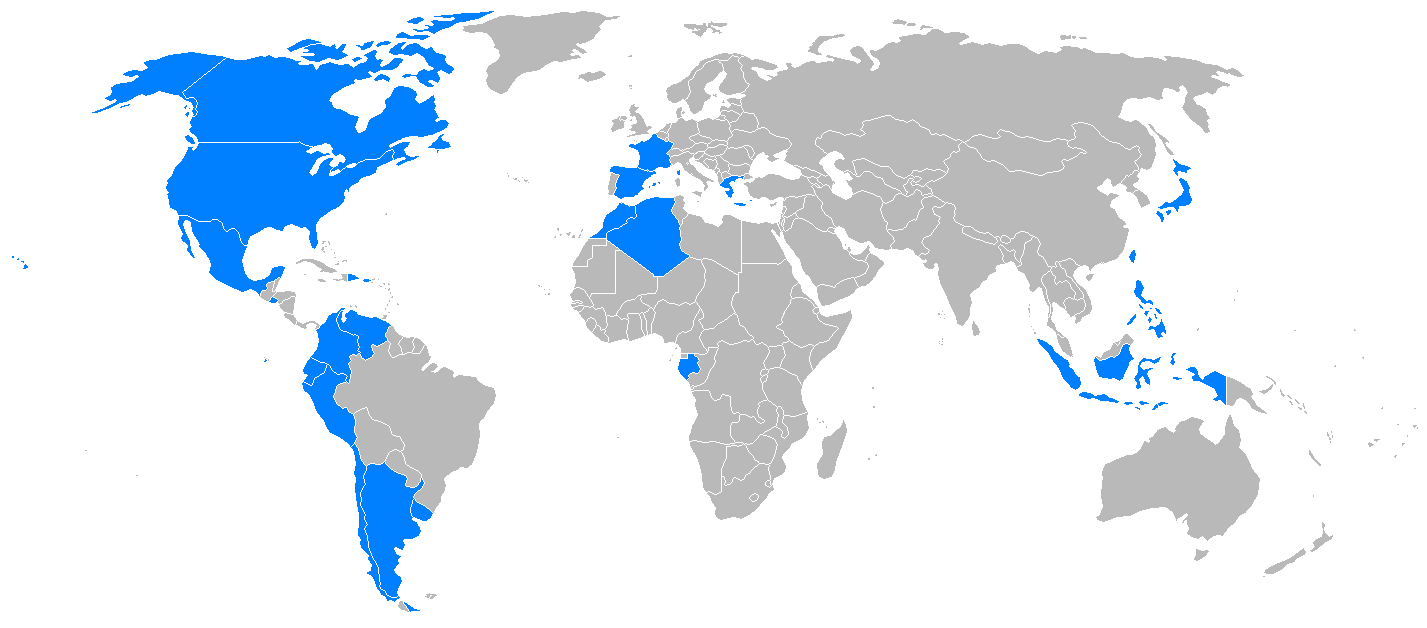
Military T-34 operators

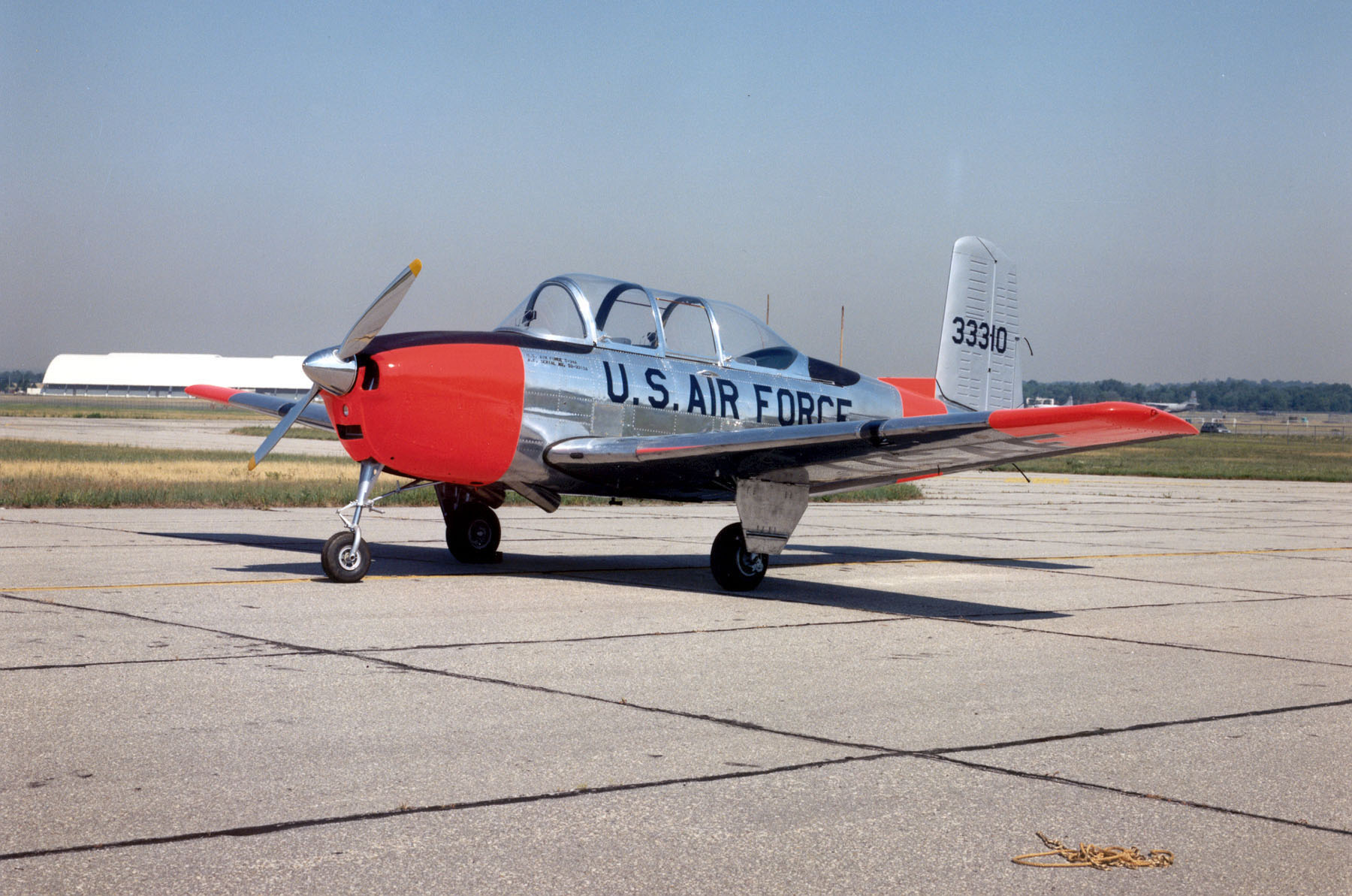
A T-34A Mentor at the National Museum of the USAF

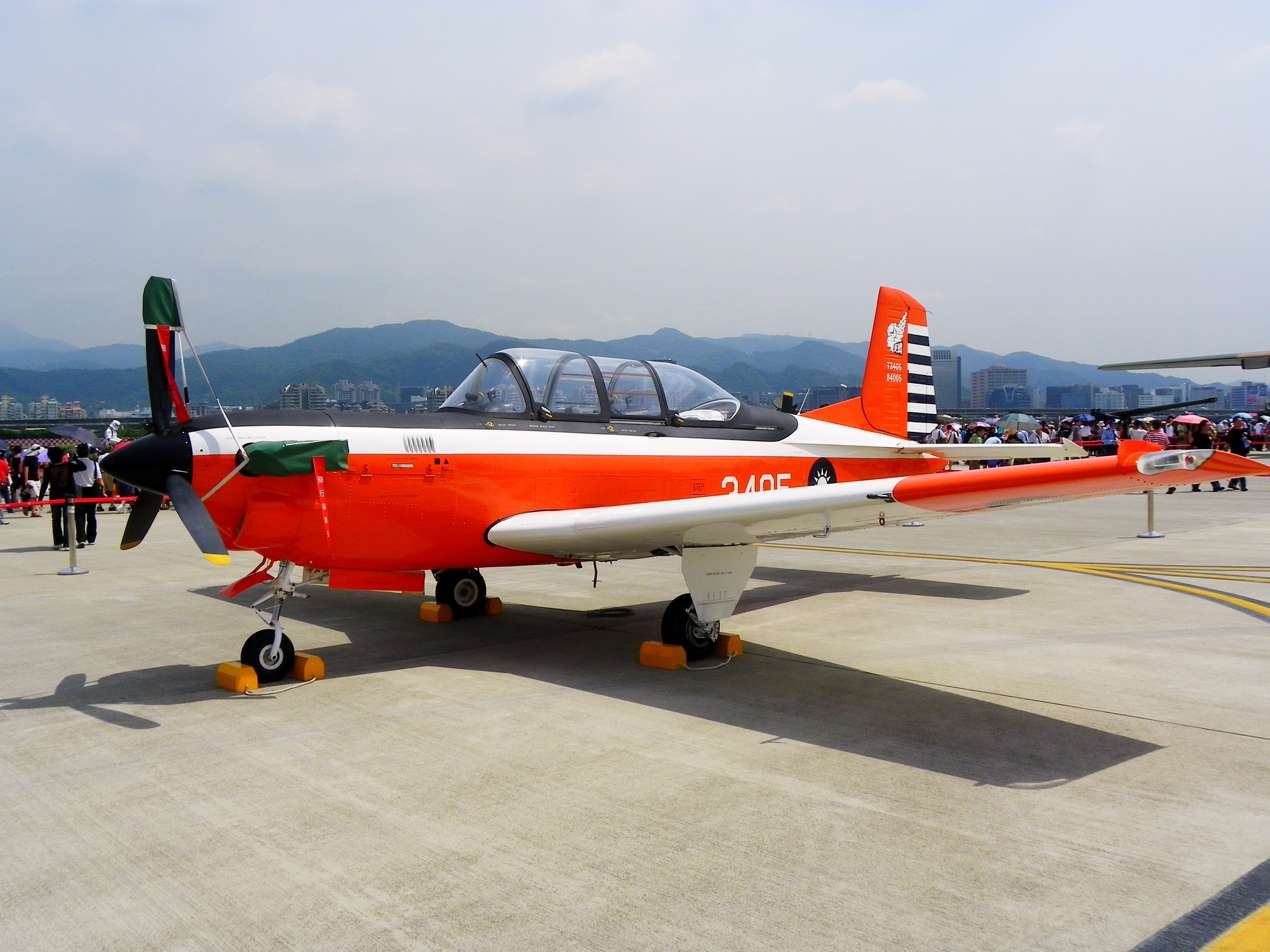
Republic of China (Taiwan) Air Force (RoCAF) T-34C

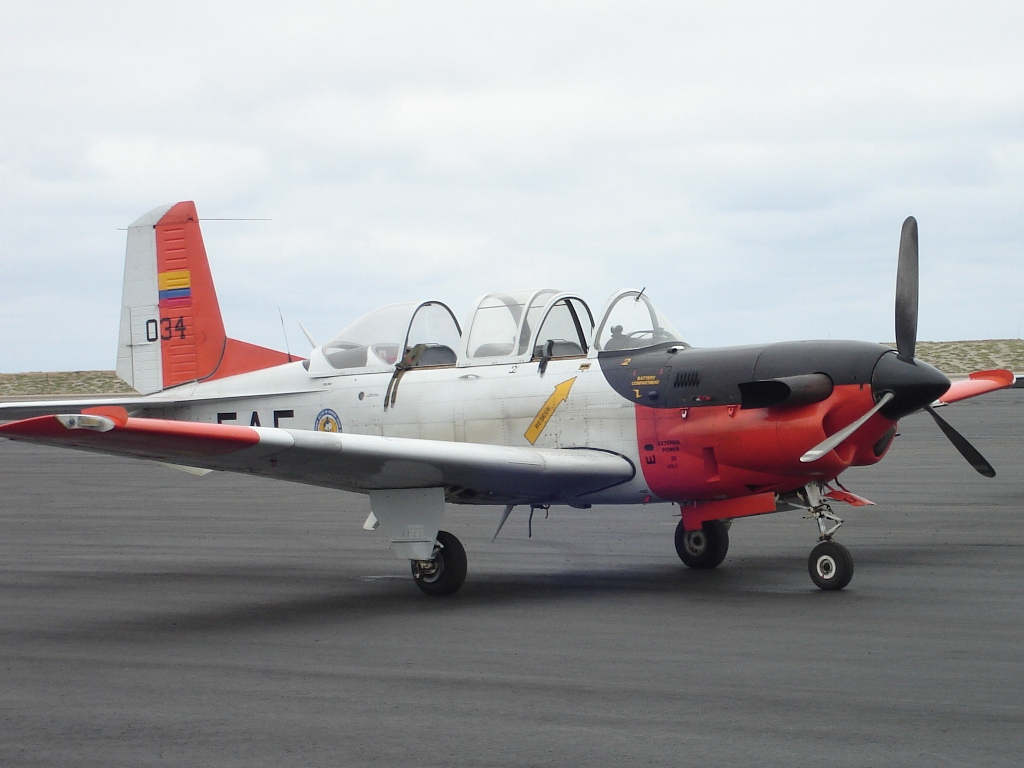
T-34C of the Ecuadorian Air Force

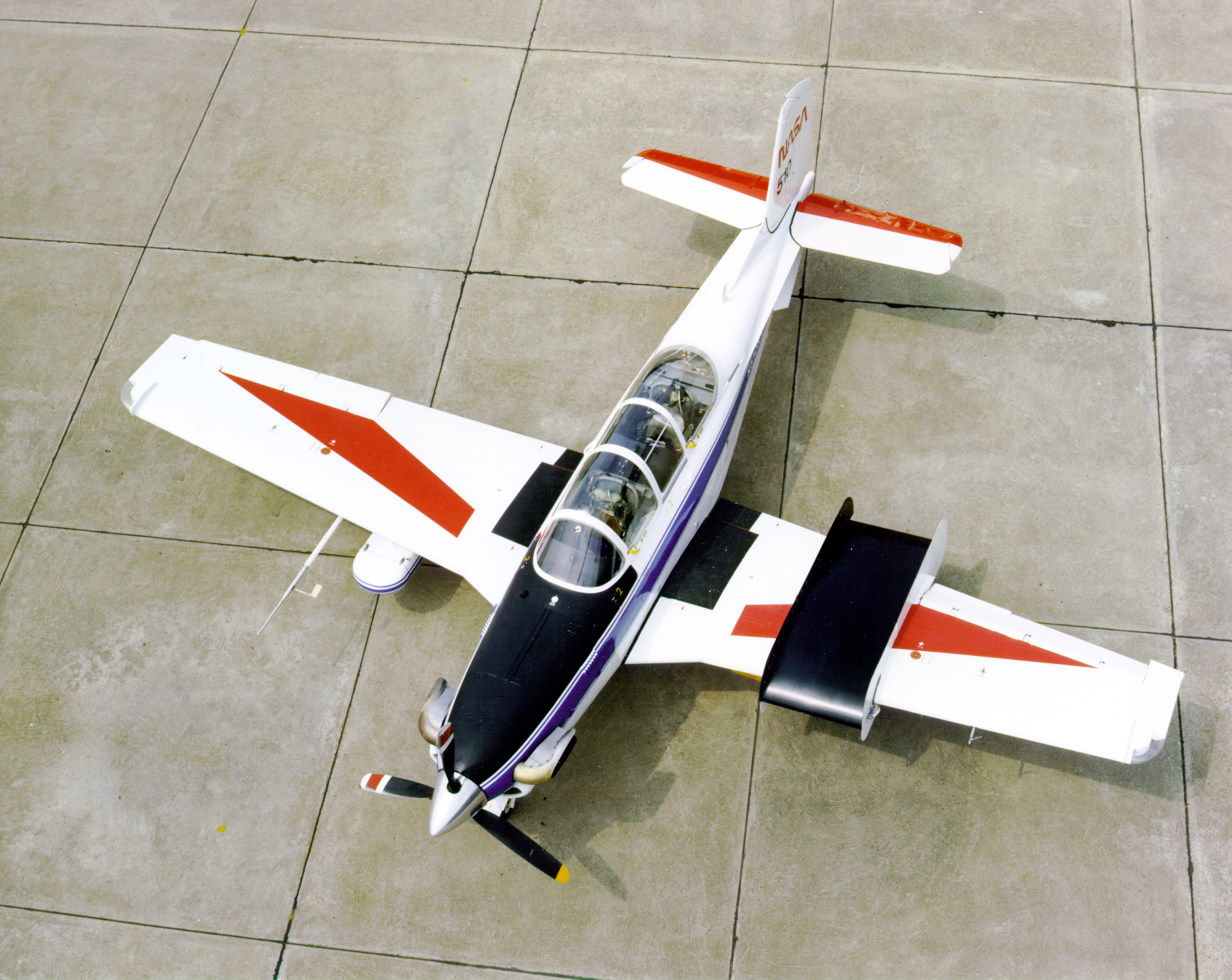
Beech T-34C Turbo Mentor operated by NASA

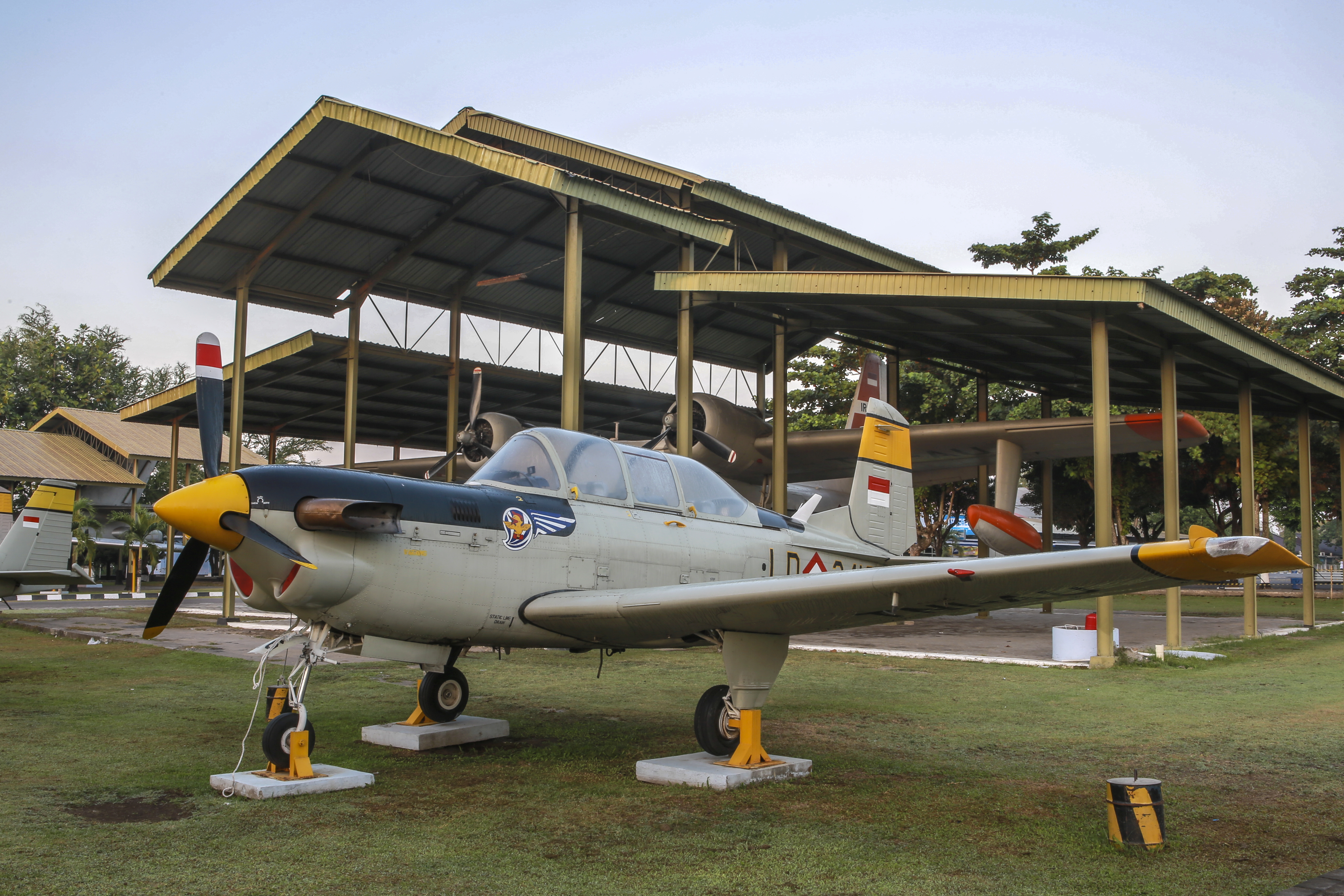
Indonesian Air Force T-34C

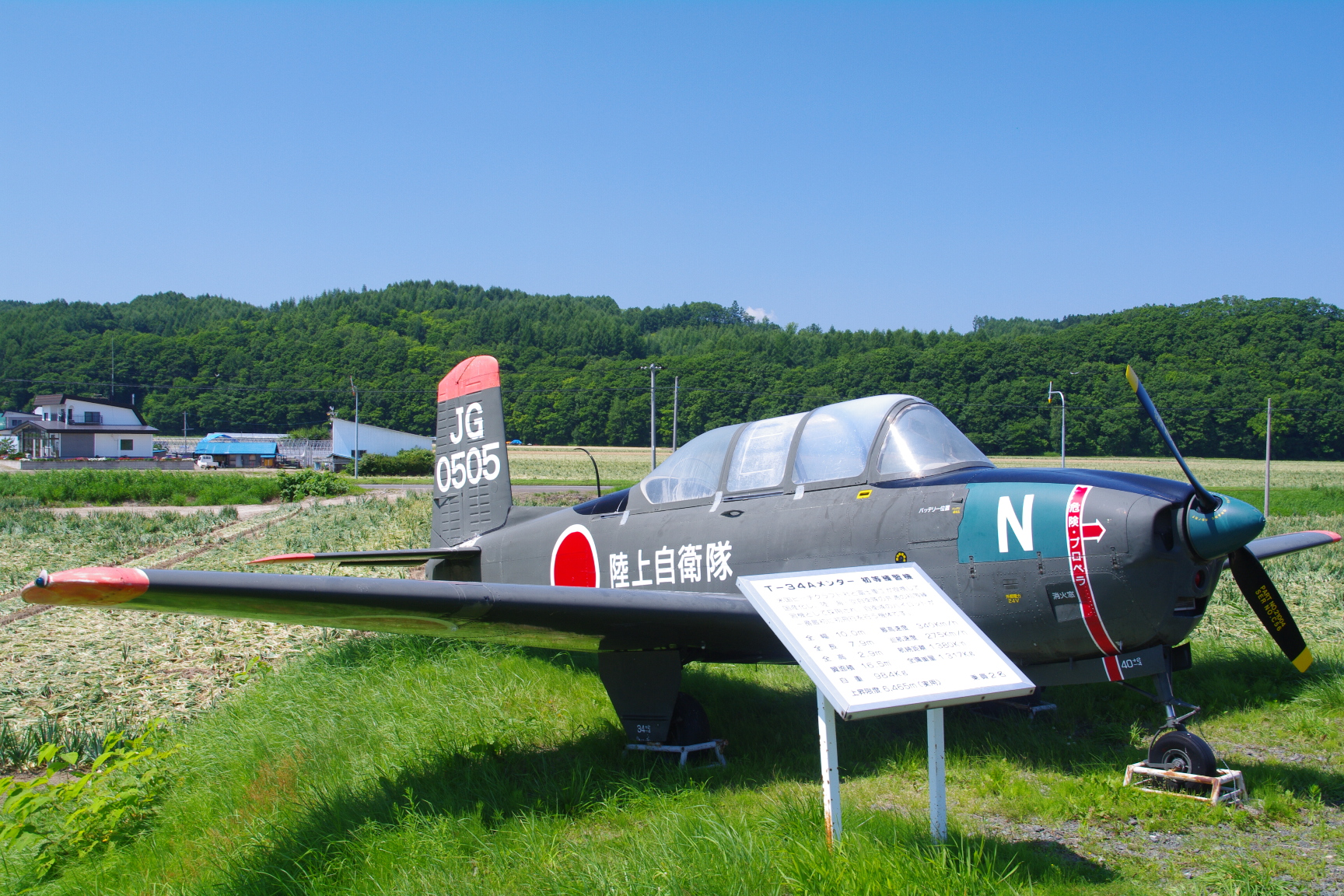
Japan Ground Self-Defense Force

Algeria
Argentina

- Argentine Air Force - Received 15 T-34B from Beechcraft, and 75 built under licence in Argentina by Fabrica Militar de Aviones (FMA).
- Argentine Naval Aviation – 15 T-34C-1 in 1978.

Bolivia

- Bolivian Air Force – Received 11 T-34A and Bs from Uruguay in 2000.

Canada

- Royal Canadian Air Force - 25 T-34A built in Canada by Canadian Car and Foundry evaluated from 1954 to 1956 with RCAF Courses 5409 and 5411, RCAF Station Penhold, Alberta, until donated to other air forces.

Chile

- Chilean Air Force
- Chilean Navy

Colombia

- Colombian Air Force – Purchased 50 T-34s in 1954, with six more acquired in 1970 and 10 in 1977. The final T-34 was retired in December 2013.

Ecuador

- Ecuadorian Air Force
- Ecuadorian Navy

El Salvador
France
Gabon
Indonesia

- Indonesian Air Force

Japan

- Japan Air Self-Defense Force - until 1976
- Japan Ground Self-Defense Force

Mexico

- Mexican Navy

Morocco

- Royal Moroccan Air Force

Peru

- Peruvian Air Force
- Peruvian Naval Aviation - T-34A and T-34C

Philippines

- Philippine Air Force - 36 Fuji built T-34As.

Saudi Arabia

- Royal Saudi Air Force

Spain

- Spanish Air Force - 25 T-34As, with local designation E.17.

Taiwan

- Republic of China Air Force - Purchased 49 T-34Cs in 1985, 40 of them are still in service.

Turkey

- Turkish Air Force - ex Canadian T-34As

United States

- United States Air Force
- United States Army
- United States Navy
- United States Marine Corps
- United States Coast Guard
- Civil Air Patrol

Uruguay

- Uruguayan Air Force
- Uruguayan Navy

Venezuela

- Venezuelan Air Force

=== Civil operators ===
Turkey

- Turkish Aeronautical Association

United States

- Dragon Flight
- Lima Lima Flight Team
- NASA
- North Carolina Forest Service

== Specifications (T-34C) ==
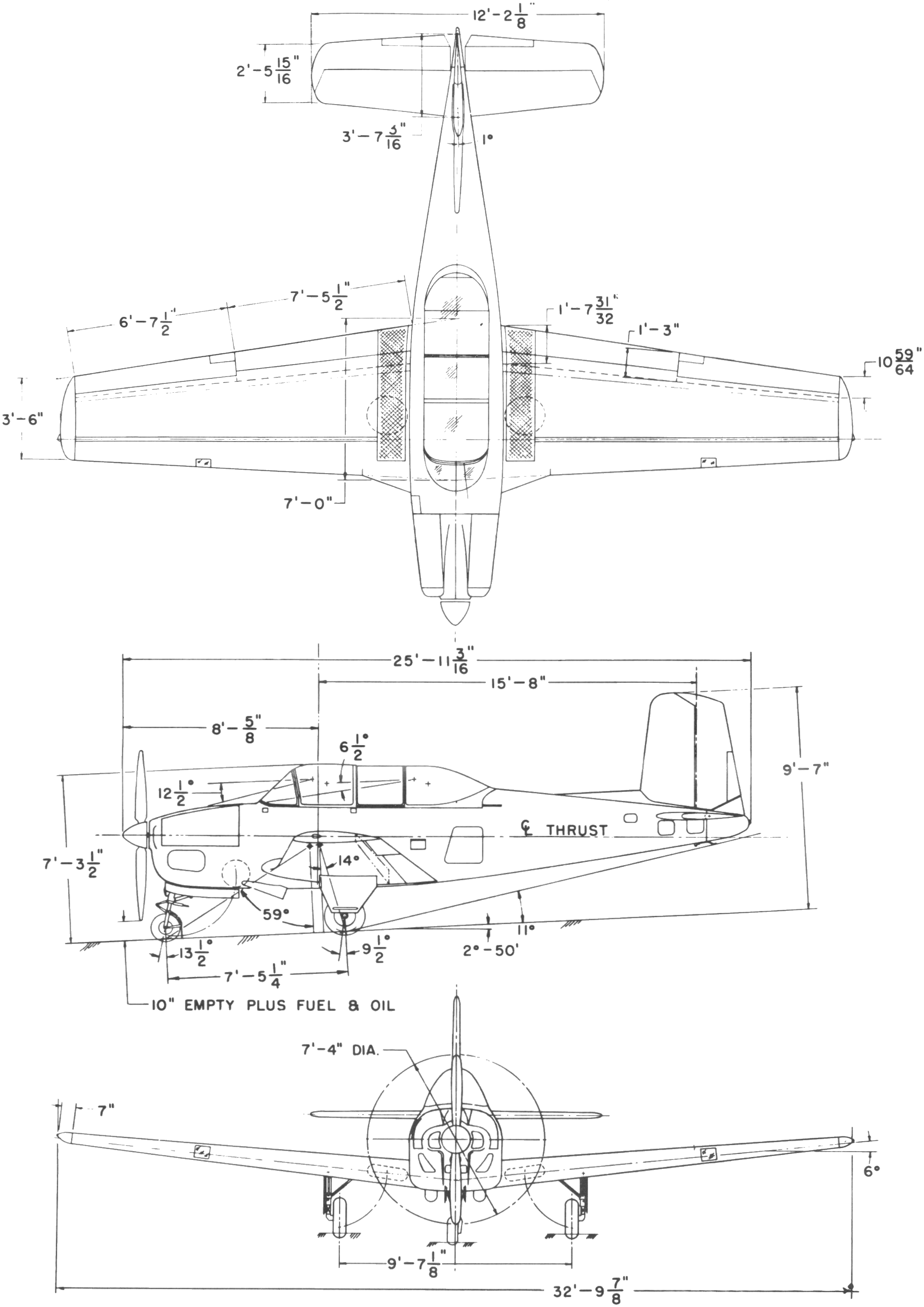
3-view line drawing of the Beechcraft T-34A Mentor

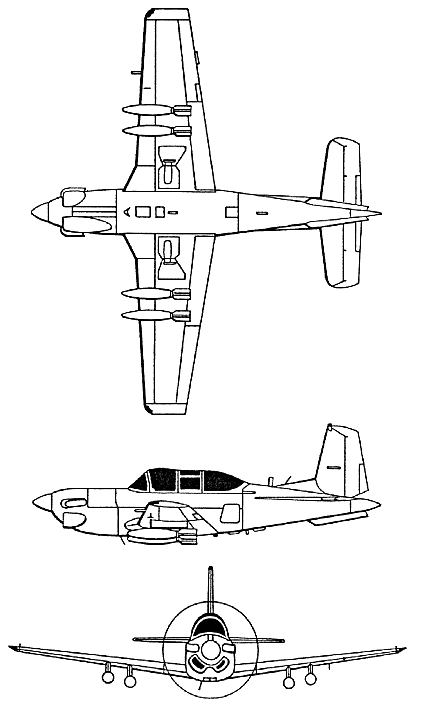
3-view line drawing of the Beechcraft T-34C Mentor

Data from Janes's All The World's Aircraft 1988–89

General characteristics

- Crew: 2
- Length: 28 ft 8 1/2 in (8.750 m)
- Wingspan: 33 ft 3 7/8 in (10.157 m)
- Height: 9 ft 7 in (2.92 m)
- Wing area: 179.6 sq ft (16.69 m^{2})
- Empty weight: 2,960 lb (1,343 kg)
- Max takeoff weight: 4,300 lb (1,950 kg) (T-34C-1 weapons trainer 5,500 lb (2,500 kg))
- Fuel capacity: 130 US gal (110 imp gal; 490 L)
- Powerplant: 1 × Pratt & Whitney Canada PT6A-25 turboprop, 550 shp (410 kW)
- Propellers: 3-bladed Hartzell constant-speed

Performance

- Cruise speed: 214 kn (246 mph, 396 km/h) at 17,000 ft (5,200 m) (max cruise)
- Stall speed: 53 kn (61 mph, 98 km/h) (flaps down, power off)
- Never exceed speed: 280 kn (320 mph, 520 km/h)
- Range: 708 nmi (815 mi, 1,311 km) at 180 kn (210 mph; 330 km/h) and 20,000 ft (6,100 m)
- Service ceiling: 30,000 ft (9,100 m)
- g limits: +6, -3
- Rate of climb: 1,480 ft/min (7.5 m/s)

Armament

- Hardpoints: 4 with a capacity of 600 lb (272 kg) inner, 300 lb (136 kg) outer, 1,200 lb (544 kg) total

== See also ==
- Beech Aircraft Corp. v. Rainey (Supreme Court case involving T-34 fatal crash of the first female pilot in the US Navy)

Related development

- Beechcraft Bonanza
- Beechcraft Travel Air
- Beechcraft Baron
- Fuji KM-2

Aircraft of comparable role, configuration, and era

- HAL HPT-32 Deepak
- North American T-28 Trojan
- Pilatus P-3
- PAC CT/4
