= Burl's Aircraft =

American aircraft parts manufacturer

- Company type: Privately held company
- Industry: Aerospace
- Founded: 1982
- Headquarters: Chugiak, Alaska, United States
- Products: Aircraft parts
- Owner: Burl A Rogers
- Website: www.burlac.com

Burl's Aircraft LLC is an American aircraft parts manufacturer located in Chugiak, Alaska. The company was founded in 1982 by Burl A Rogers, to design, engineer and manufacture Federal Aviation Administration approved parts for light aircraft.

== History ==
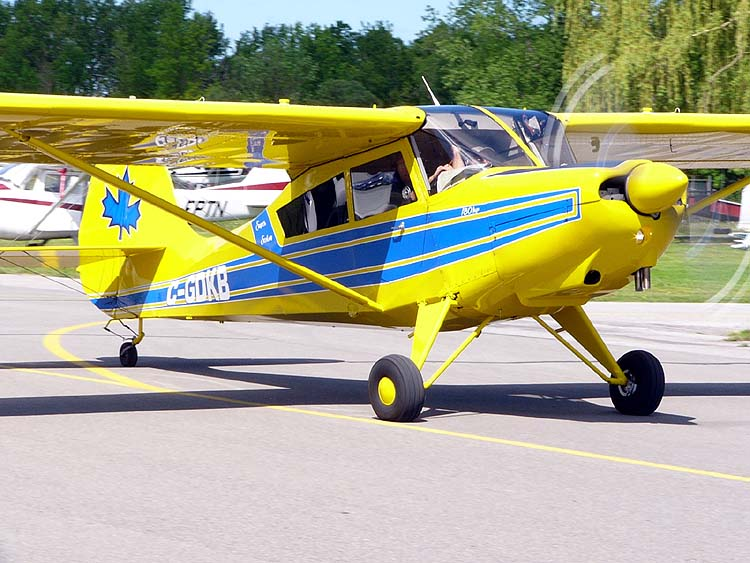
Modernized Aeronca Sedan

The company was established in February 1982 as Burl's Aircraft Rebuild and was granted FAA inspection authorization in 1985.

The company's first product was the FAA approved Magnum I tailwheel penetration ski, made available in 1982. The eight different models of this product have sold 425 units in the past 25 years.

The Alpha Omega Suspension System was developed to a customer specification as a replacement for existing bungee landing gear shocks used on aircraft. The customer noted that the traditional shocks leak and wear out as well as provide too much bounce upon landing. Roger's design employs solid polymer as the shock-absorber, housed in a steel-plated cylinder that is sealed with epoxy and mounted with titanium tubes.

Burl A Rogers purchased the Aircraft Type Certificate for the Aeronca Sedan in July 2000 from William Brad Mitchell and has since then manufactured parts for the design and issued Service Bulletins. The Sedan is known to the FAA as the Burl A. Rogers 15AC Sedan since the purchase of the type certificate, although no complete aircraft have yet been produced by the company.

== Inventions ==
- Magnum I - Wheel Penetration Tailski
- Alpha Omega Suspension System (AOSS)
