= Golden West Airlines Flight 261 =

1975 mid-air collision

Accident
- Date: January 9, 1975
- Summary: Mid-air collision
- Site: Whittier, California, USA; 33°59′N 118°4′W
- Total fatalities: 14
- Total survivors: 0

First aircraft
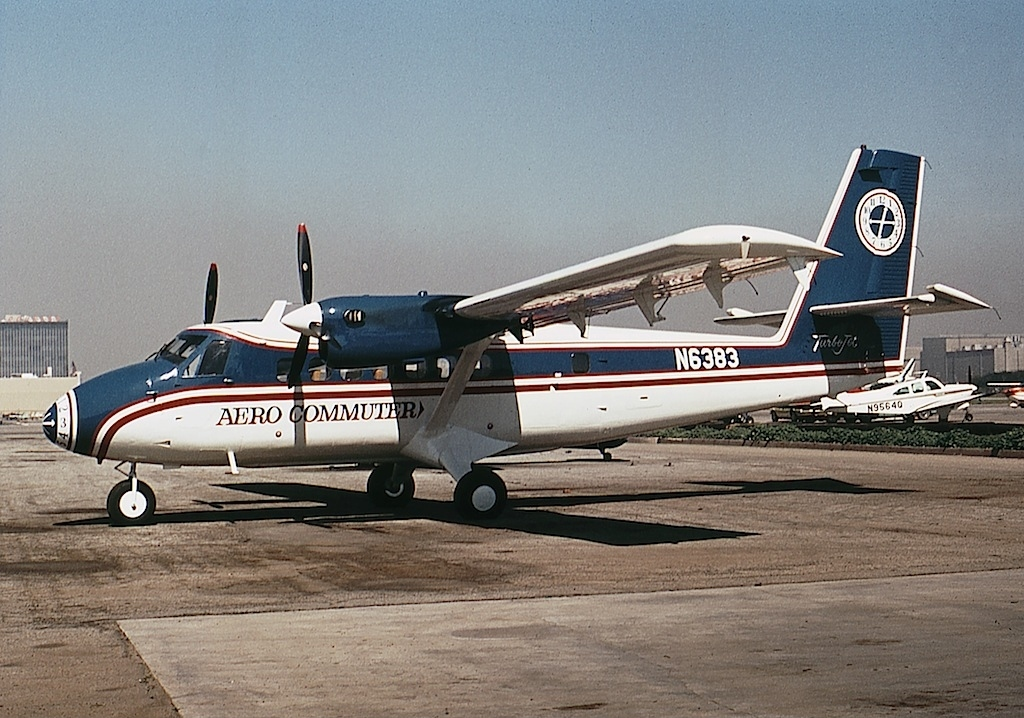
- N6383, the aircraft involved in the accident in 1968 while still in service with Aero Commuter
- Type: De Havilland Twin Otter
- Operator: Golden West Airlines
- Registration: N6383
- Flight origin: Ontario International Airport
- Destination: Los Angeles International Airport
- Occupants: 12
- Passengers: 10
- Crew: 2
- Fatalities: 12
- Survivors: 0

Second aircraft
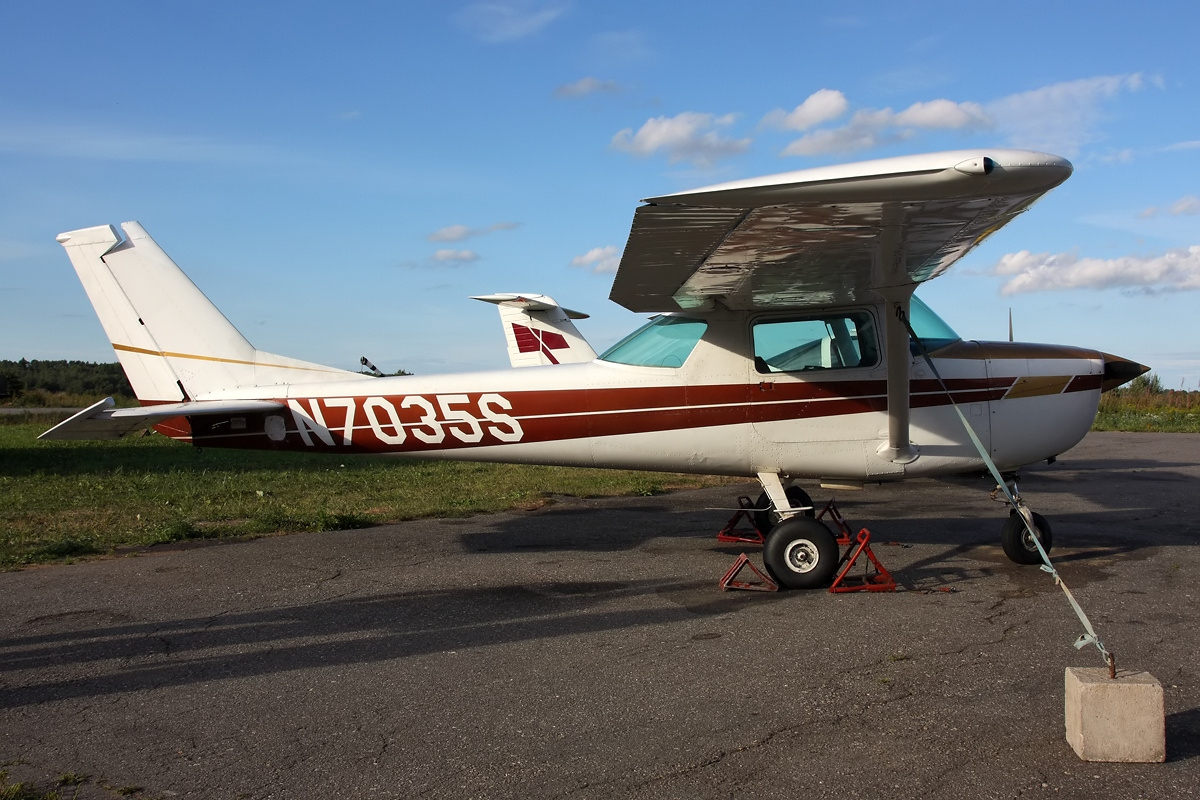
- A similar Cessna 150
- Type: Cessna 150
- Operator: CessnAir Aviation, Inc.
- Registration: N11421
- Occupants: 2
- Fatalities: 2
- Injuries: 0
- Survivors: 0

Golden West Airlines Flight 261, a de Havilland Canada DHC-6 Twin Otter, collided with a Cessna 150 (N11421), owned by CessnAir Aviation, Inc., near Whittier, California. The accident occurred on January 9, 1975, at approximately 4:07 p.m. PST, while the Sun was just 9 degrees above the western horizon, directly into the eyes of the pilots of GW flight 261.

Both aircraft were destroyed by the collision and subsequent ground impact. The 10 passengers and 2 pilots on the Twin Otter, and the instructor pilot and student pilot in the Cessna 150 were killed. Debris fell on homes and lawns but no one on the ground was injured. The wreckage of both aircraft was scattered over an 8 to 10 city block area. The fuselage of the Twin Otter fell into the schoolyard of Katherine Edwards Middle School, where about 300 spectators were watching an outdoor basketball game, while the wings landed two blocks away. The fuselage of the Cessna fell in the front yard of a house, about two blocks from the Otter fuselage.

The Cessna impacted the left side of the Twin Otter at an approximate angle of 90 degrees. "(1) the Cessna's firewall and instrument panel were embedded in the Twin Otter's fuselage forward of the wing; (2) the propeller slashes in the Cessna's right wing formed an angle of about 88 degrees with the wing leading edge; and (3) the Twin Otter's left engine nacelle and engine were driven inboard by the collision." Ground witnesses said that neither plane made any last moment maneuver attempt to avoid the collision.

GW 261 was a regularly scheduled passenger flight between Ontario International Airport (ONT) and Los Angeles International Airport (LAX), both in the Los Angeles area of California. The flight departed from ONT at 1556 PST, on a visual flight rules (VFR) flight plan. That separated GW 261 from the larger aircraft, which arrived at LAX on instrument flight rules (IFR) flight plans.

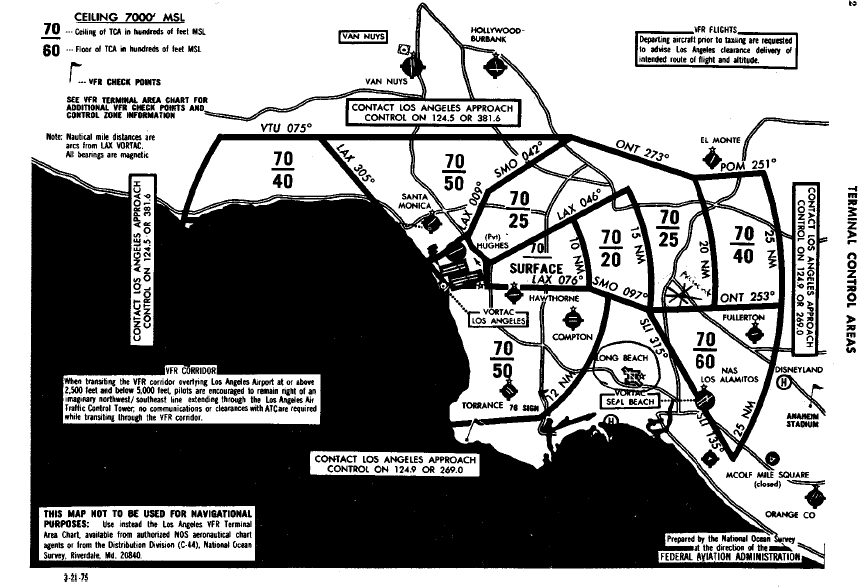
LAX Group I TCA Chart. The planes collided 17 miles east of the LAX radar antennae, at 2,200 feet MSL, just below the floor of the TCA

The IFR flights were required to remain within the confines of the Los Angeles Group 1 terminal control area (TCA) (now Class B Airspace), while smaller planes were required to remain outside of the TCA, until the designated entry point, which was specified in their assigned VFR TCA arrival. In the case of GW 261, it was to remain outside of the TCA until the 10 DME fix of runway 24 right localizer, and to enter at an altitude of 1,500 feet MSL. The top of the TCA was 7,000 feet, while the base varied, depending on the distance from LAX. That mixed GW 261 in with all the other small plane VFR traffic in the Los Angeles Basin, which did not have transponders. Most of those were not flying to LAX, so they were not in radio communication with LAX radar controllers. The only defense was the "see and be seen" method of collision avoidance. That deficient method of traffic separation failed to work that day, as it has failed many other times in high density traffic areas.

== Probable cause ==
"The National Transportation Safety Board determines that the probable cause of the accident was the failure of both flightcrews to see the other aircraft in sufficient time to initiate evasive action. The Board is unable to determine why each crew failed to see and avoid the other aircraft; however, the Board believes that the ability of both crews to detect the other aircraft in time to avoid a collision was reduced because of the position of the sun, the closure angle of the aircraft, and the necessity for the Twin Otter's flightcrew to acquire visual contact with radar-reported traffic directly in front of them."
