= Golden West Airlines =

Commuter airline of the United States (1967–1983)

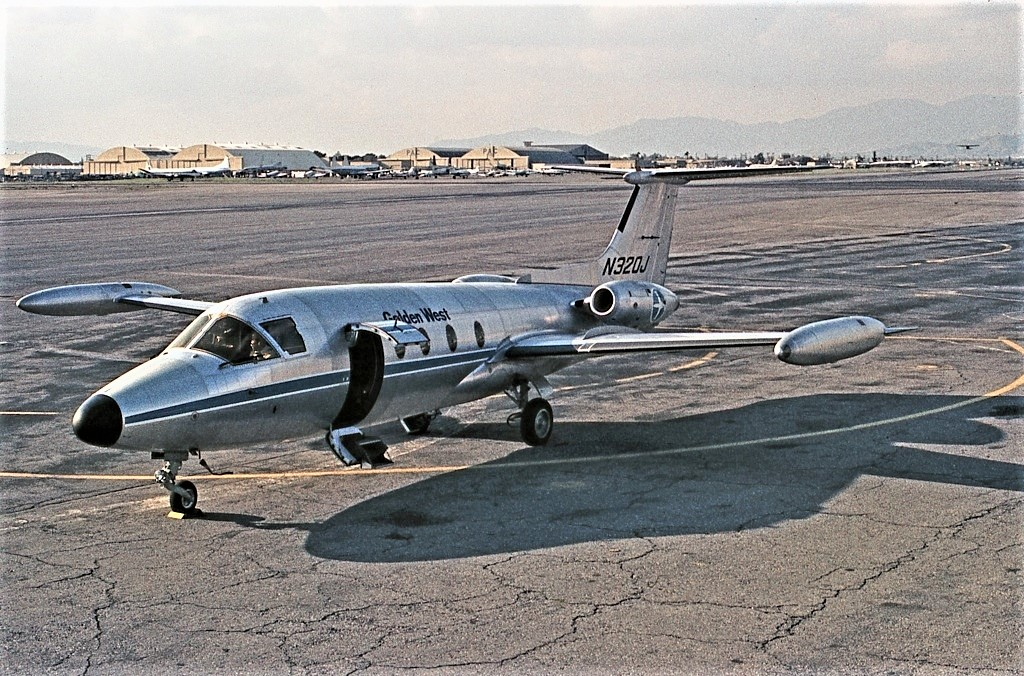
- Golden West Airlines Hansajet
IATA	ICAO	Call sign
GW	GWA	GOLDEN WEST
- Commenced operations: 1967; 59 years ago
- Ceased operations: April 1983; 43 years ago
- Fleet size: de Havilland Canada DHC-6 Twin Otter; HFB 320 Hansa Jet; Short 330; de Havilland Canada DHC-7 Dash 7
- Destinations: 11 (1982)
- Headquarters: Long Beach, California, U.S.

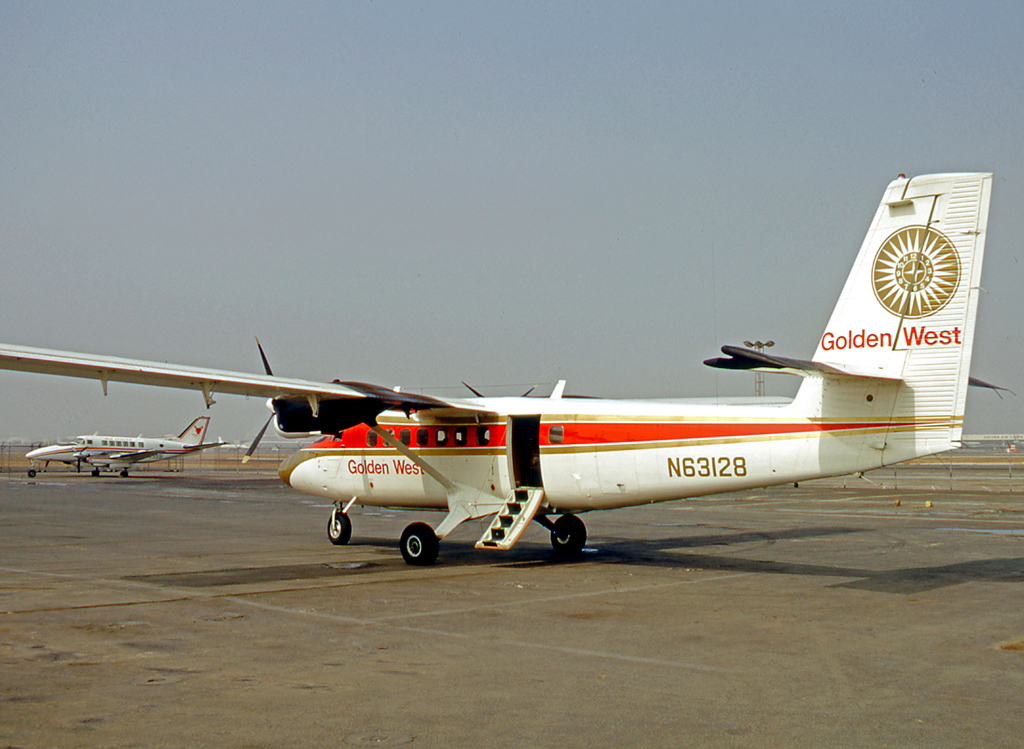
Golden West Twin Otter LAX 1970

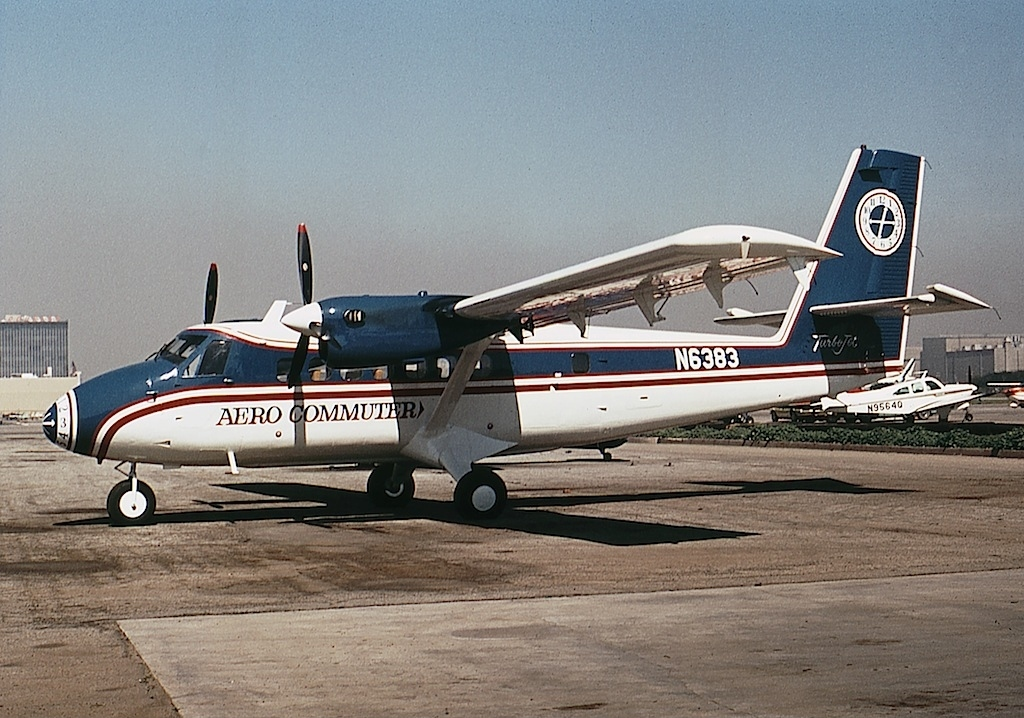
Aero Commuter Twin Otter Long Beach 1968

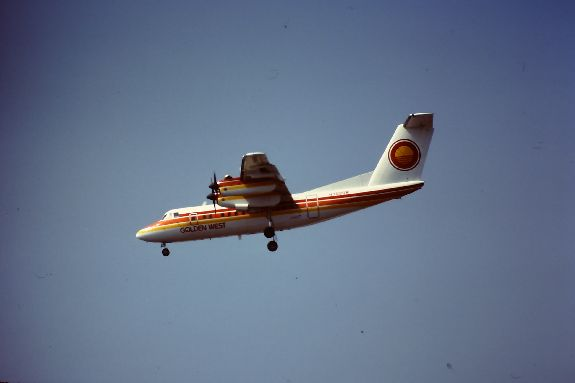
Golden West Airlines de Havilland Canada DHC-7 Dash 7, 1981

Golden West Airlines was a commuter airline that operated flights on a high volume schedule in California. It ceased operations in 1983.

== History ==
The original Golden West Airlines, headquartered at Van Nuys, California, was founded in 1968 and operated out of Terminal 4 at Los Angeles International Airport with a fleet of de Havilland Canada DHC-6 Twin Otter STOL capable turboprops and at least one HFB 320 Hansa Jet aircraft, serving Pomona, Riverside, Santa Ana, and Ventura. This airline ceased operations on March 11, 1969.

Aero Commuter, was founded in December 1967 by architect William Pereira, whose son was one of the founders of Air California. Aero Commuter was, in fact, briefly known as Air California Commuter. and based in Long Beach, operated flights between Long Beach, Los Angeles International Airport (LAX), Avalon, Burbank, and Fullerton. Aero Commuter operated de Havilland Canada DHC-6 Twin Otter STOL capable aircraft. It also acquired Catalina Air Lines which had been founded in 1953 as Avalon Air Transport. By 1968 service had expanded to include Apple Valley, Bakersfield, El Monte, Ontario, Oceanside, Palm Springs, Palmdale, San Diego, and Santa Ana. In 1969, it merged with Skymark Airlines (a Sacramento-based charter and commuter airline founded in February 1968 that also operated the DHC-6 Twin Otter) and Cable Commuter Airlines (an Upland general aviation concern based at Cable Airport that had entered the scheduled commuter airline business in 1968 via a hub at Los Angeles International Airport (LAX) with flights to such southern California destinations to Burbank, Colton, Inyokern, Ontario, Oxnard, Palmdale, Palm Springs, Santa Ana (Orange County Airport), Santa Barbara and Santa Maria as well as service to Lake Havasu City in Arizona with all flights operated with DHC-6 Twin Otter aircraft). Upon the demise of the original Golden West Airlines (see above) in early 1969, Aero Commuter acquired several assets from Golden West, including its name. Golden West also briefly operated jet service with the HFB 320 Hansa Jet, a West German manufactured business jet configured with ten passenger seats which the airline flew in scheduled service from Burbank Airport (BUR, now Bob Hope Airport) to Santa Barbara (SBA) and Palm Springs (PSP) in 1969.

As Golden West Airlines it continued to expand aggressively through the 1970s, adding service to San Francisco (SFO), Oakland, Bakersfield, Fresno, Oxnard, Santa Rosa, Merced, Modesto, Monterey, San Jose, Stockton and other smaller airports—many of which no longer have commercial service—such as Van Nuys Airport, Fullerton Municipal Airport, and the Airport in the Sky on Santa Catalina Island. In 1971 it attempted to acquire Los Angeles Airways, a local helicopter commuter airline, but the deal fell through. Golden West did acquire Catalina Air Lines, a seaplane operator that served Catalina Island off the coast of southern California with the Grumman G-21 Goose. These Grumman amphibious aircraft were operated as Catalina Golden West which was a division of Golden West.

Because of California's growth and tourist appeal, Golden West was able to become an interline partner with a number of domestic and international airlines. According to the January 1, 1973 Golden West system timetable, these airlines included Aer Lingus, Aerolíneas Argentinas, Aeroméxico, Air Canada, Air France, Alaska Airlines, Allegheny Airlines, Aloha Airlines, American, Braniff International, Continental Airlines, Delta, Eastern, Finnair, Frontier Airlines, Hawaiian Airlines, Hughes Airwest, Japan Airlines (JAL), Lufthansa, National Airlines, Northeast Airlines, Ozark Air Lines, Pan American World Airways (Pan Am), Piedmont Airlines, Scandinavian Airlines System (SAS), Southern Airways, Trans World Airlines (TWA), United Airlines, Western Airlines, Wien Air Alaska and other air carriers.

By the early 1980s, Golden West was the largest commuter airline in California operating a high frequency shuttle schedule between LAX and Santa Barbara and San Diego. In 1981, Golden West was the only air carrier flying nonstop between Santa Barbara and LAX with up to fourteen round trip flights a day. Its fleet had grown to include larger aircraft such as the Short 330 and de Havilland Canada DHC-7 Dash 7. The 50-passenger seat Dash 7 was the largest aircraft ever operated by the airline. A huge debt service, among other factors, drove Golden West Airlines out of business in April 1983.

In 2000, Pinnacle Air Charter, Inc. acquired the Air Carrier Certificate for Golden West Airlines. It ultimately operated again, under the DBA of Pinnacle Air Charter, and later, Platinum Air Charter, Inc., conducting on-demand air charter and air ambulance operations under FAR Part 135. Its base of operations was located at Pomona's Brackett Field, and conducted flight operations primarily out of San Bernardino International Airport. It suspended operations and closed in 2007.

== Fleet ==
The Golden West fleet consisted of the following aircraft models and quantities.

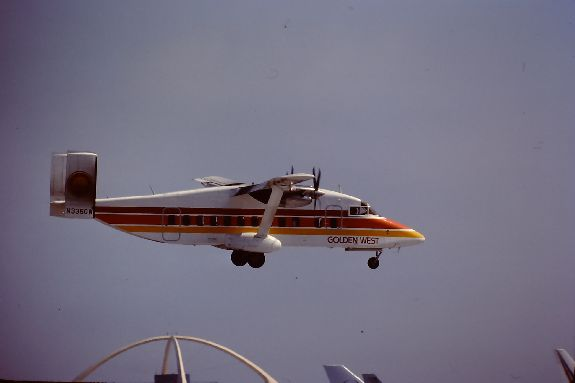
Golden West Airlines Short 330, 1982

- 4 – Beechcraft Model 99 Airliner
- 27 – de Havilland Canada DHC-6 Twin Otter
- 5 – de Havilland Canada DHC-7 Dash 7
- 1 – Grumman G-21 Goose (amphibious aircraft that were formerly operated by Catalina Air Lines which was acquired by Golden West)
- 1 − HFB 320 Hansa Jet
- 5 − Short 330

== Destinations in 1982 ==
The July 1, 1982, Golden West timetable map includes:

- Bakersfield (BFL)
- Fresno (FAT)
- Lake Tahoe (TVL)
- Los Angeles (LAX)
- Monterey (MRY)
- Ontario (ONT)
- Orange County (SNA, now John Wayne Airport)
- Oxnard (OXR)
- San Diego (SAN)
- San Francisco (SFO)
- Santa Barbara (SBA)

== Former destinations ==
Before 1982, Golden West served the following destinations in California at various times:

- Avalon Harbor Seaplane Base, Catalina Island (served by Golden West division Catalina Air Lines with Grumman Goose seaplanes)
- Catalina Airport (AVX) (also known as Airport in the Sky)
- Edwards Air Force Base
- Fullerton Airport
- Inyokern
- Long Beach Airport (served by Golden West with DHC-6 Twin Otters and by Golden West division Catalina Air Lines with Grumman Goose seaplanes)
- McClellan–Palomar Airport
- Merced
- Modesto
- Mojave Airport
- Oakland
- Palmdale Airport
- Palm Springs
- Pomona (POC)
- Redlands Airport
- Riverside
- Sacramento
- San Jose
- Santa Rosa
- Stockton
- Tehachapi
- Trona
- Two Harbors Seaplane Base, Catalina Island (served by Golden West division Catalina Air Lines with Grumman Goose seaplanes)
- Vandenberg Air Force Base

== Incidents and accidents ==
On January 9, 1975, Golden West Airlines Flight 261, a de Havilland Twin Otter, collided with a Cessna 150 over Whittier, California, killing 14 people in both aircraft (all 12 aboard the Golden West plane and the 2 occupants of the Cessna).

== Sources ==
- R.E.G. Davies and I.E. Quastler, Commuter Airlines of the United States (Smithsonian Institution Press, 1995), ISBN 1-56098-404-X

== See also ==
- List of defunct airlines of the United States
