= Fullerton Municipal Airport =

General aviation airport serving Greater Los Angeles, California

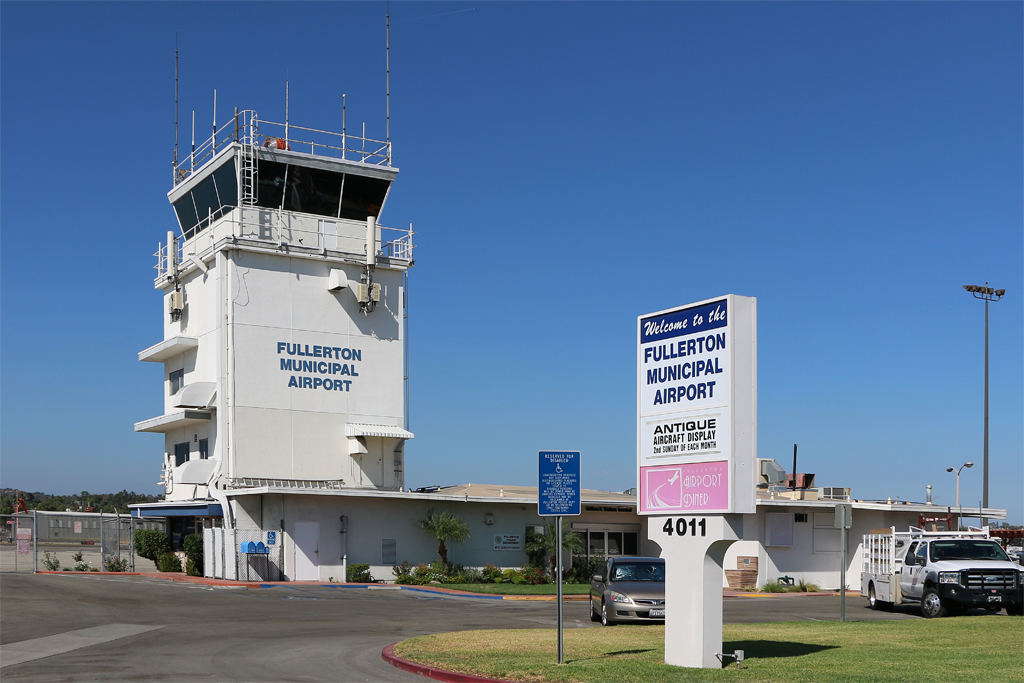
- IATA: FUL; ICAO: KFUL; FAA LID: FUL

Summary
- Airport type: Public
- Operator: City of Fullerton
- Serves: Greater Los Angeles
- Location: Fullerton, California, U.S.
- Opened: January 1927; 99 years ago
- Elevation AMSL: 29.3 m (96 ft)
- Coordinates: 33°52′19.25″N 117°58′47.22″W

Maps
- Location within the Los Angeles metropolitan area Location within California Location within the United States
- Interactive map of Fullerton Municipal Airport

Runways
Direction	Length		Surface
Direction	m	ft	Surface
6/24	951	3,121	Asphalt

Helipads
Number	Length		Surface
Number	m	ft	Surface
H1	11	37	Concrete

Fullerton Municipal Airport (IATA: FUL, ICAO: KFUL, FAA LID: FUL) is a regional relief airport in Orange County, California. It is owned and operated by the City of Fullerton.

The airport is in the southwestern corner of Fullerton on Commonwealth Avenue, northeast of the junction of the Santa Ana (I-5) and Riverside (SR 91) Freeways. The airport and its industrial park are surrounded by residential areas. It is popular among private pilots traveling within the state of California, but there are occasional flights to and from Nevada, Arizona and Utah.

== History ==
Fullerton Municipal Airport can trace its origins to 1913 when barnstormers and crop dusters used the former pig farm as a makeshift landing strip. The site later became home to a sewer farm.

The airport's "official" birthday is 1927. William and Robert Dowling, with the aid of H. A. Krause and the Fullerton Chamber of Commerce, had petitioned the council for permission to turn the by then-abandoned sewer farm into a landing field. The Fullerton City Council approved Ordinance 514 in January 1927, formally establishing the airport. The council leased the land to the chamber for five years, at a fee of $1 per year, and the chamber, in turn, subleased operations to William Dowling and friend Willard Morris of Yorba Linda. The city would assume direct control of the facility in January 1941.

A portion of the Howard Hughes feature Hell's Angels was filmed at Fullerton in 1929. Hughes would feature later in Fullerton's history by buying a tract of land for Hughes Aircraft. The campus eventually became home to Hughes Aircraft Ground Systems Group, closing in 2000.

In 1949 Dick Riedel and Midway City's Bill Barris of Fullerton Air Service, sponsored by the Fullerton Chamber of Commerce, set a world flight endurance record from the airport, keeping their modified Aeronca Sedan, the Sunkist Lady aloft for 1,008 hours and 2 minutes.

The control tower, built with Federal Aviation Administration funds in 1959, was the first in Orange County.

The California Highway Patrol, Anaheim Police Department, Orange County Fire Authority, and Mercy Air maintain helicopters on the airfield.

The airport also had scheduled passenger air service provided by Golden West Airlines during the 1970s to Los Angeles International Airport (LAX) which was flown with de Havilland Canada DHC-6 Twin Otter turboprop aircraft.

After two crashes in eight days in 1992, Fullerton Airport faced calls for it to be closed, by the then-mayor of Buena Park, Rhonda McCune. Due to the airport's location near the border of Fullerton and Buena Park, Mayor McCune alleged that "Fullerton gets all of the economic benefits from the airport while we get the accidents."

The now-closed flight school, Aviation Facilities Inc. (AFI Flight Training), was located West of the control tower on the south side of the field. (closed 2022)

== Facilities ==
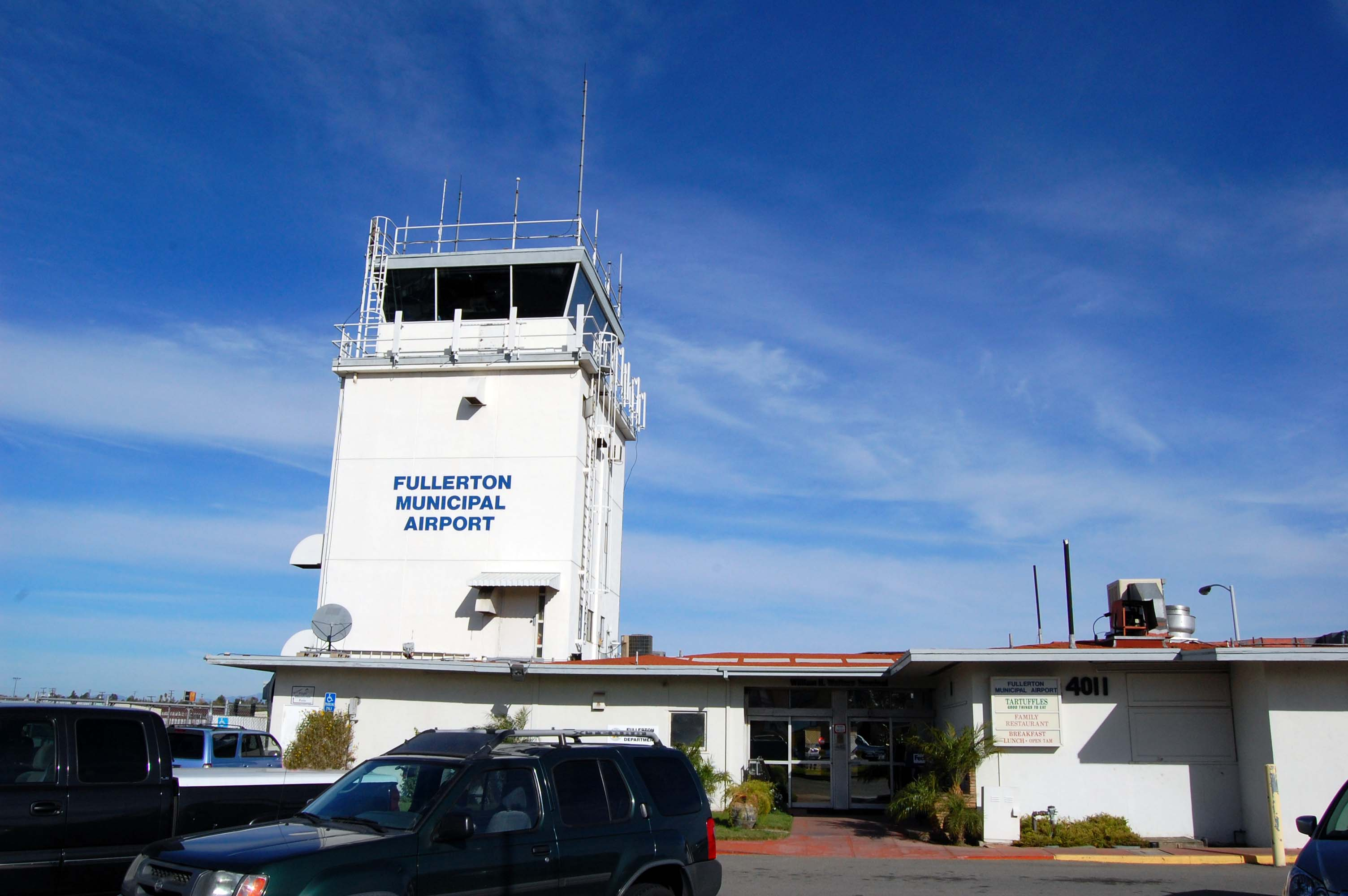
Fullerton Municipal Airport tower

Fullerton Municipal Airport covers 86 acres (350,000 m^{2}) and has one runway and one heliport:

- 6/24: 3,121 × 75 ft (951 × 23 m), asphalt
- Heliport H1: 37 × 37 ft (11 × 11 m), concrete

Its control tower handles an average of 262 operations per day.

The facility is close by to the Interstate 5 and Highway 91 interchange, along with Knott's Berry Farm in Buena Park and Disneyland in Anaheim.

== Accidents and incidents ==
- On January 2nd, 2025, an RV-10 manufactured by Van's Aircraft, registered N8757R, crashed into a furniture manufacturing facility shortly after takeoff from FUL. Both occupants, pilot Pascal Reid and his daughter Kelly Reid, were tragically killed, and 19 more inside the building were injured. Preliminary findings by the National Transportation Safety Board (NTSB) revealed that the left-side door was not properly latched during taxi and takeoff. After takeoff, the door opened, and witnesses reported seeing the pilot trying to pull it down. Soon, the pilot requested an immediate return to FUL, which was granted by air traffic control. He attempted to land on Runway 06, but changed to Runway 24 just moments later. The RV-10 began banking left and right, then nose-dived into the furniture facility, the left door separating before impact. As of 2026, the accident is still under investigation by the NTSB and the FAA.
