= Turboshaft =

Gas turbine used to spin a shaft

A simplified turboshaft engine. The compressor spool (turbine) is shown in green and the free/power spool (turbine) in purple.

A turboshaft engine is a form of gas turbine that is optimized to produce shaft horsepower rather than jet thrust. In concept, turboshaft engines are very similar to turbojets, with additional turbine expansion to extract heat energy from the exhaust and convert it into output shaft power. They are even more similar to turboprops, with only minor differences, and a single engine is often sold in both forms.

Turboshaft engines are commonly used in applications that require a sustained high power output, high reliability, small size, and light weight. These include helicopters, auxiliary power units, boats and ships, tanks, hovercraft, and stationary equipment.

== Overview ==
A turboshaft engine may be made up of two major parts assemblies: the 'gas generator' and the 'power section'. The gas generator consists of the compressor, combustion chambers with ignitors and fuel nozzles, and one or more stages of turbine. The power section consists of additional stages of turbines, a gear reduction system, and the shaft output. The gas generator creates the hot expanding gases to drive the power section. Depending on the design, the engine accessories may be driven either by the gas generator or by the power section.

In most designs, the gas generator and power section are mechanically separate so they can each rotate at different speeds appropriate for the conditions, referred to as a 'free power turbine'. A free power turbine can be an extremely useful design feature for vehicles, as it allows the design to forgo the weight and cost of complex multiple-ratio transmissions and clutches.

An unusual example of the turboshaft principle is the Pratt & Whitney F135-PW-600 turbofan engine for the STOVL Lockheed F-35B Lightning II – in conventional mode it operates as a turbofan, but when powering the Rolls-Royce LiftSystem, it switches partially to turboshaft mode to send 29,000 horsepower forward through a shaft and partially to turbofan mode to continue to send thrust to the main engine's fan and rear nozzle.

Large helicopters use two or three turboshaft engines. The Mil Mi-26 uses two Lotarev D-136 at 11,400 hp each, while the Sikorsky CH-53E Super Stallion uses three General Electric T64 at 4,380 hp each.

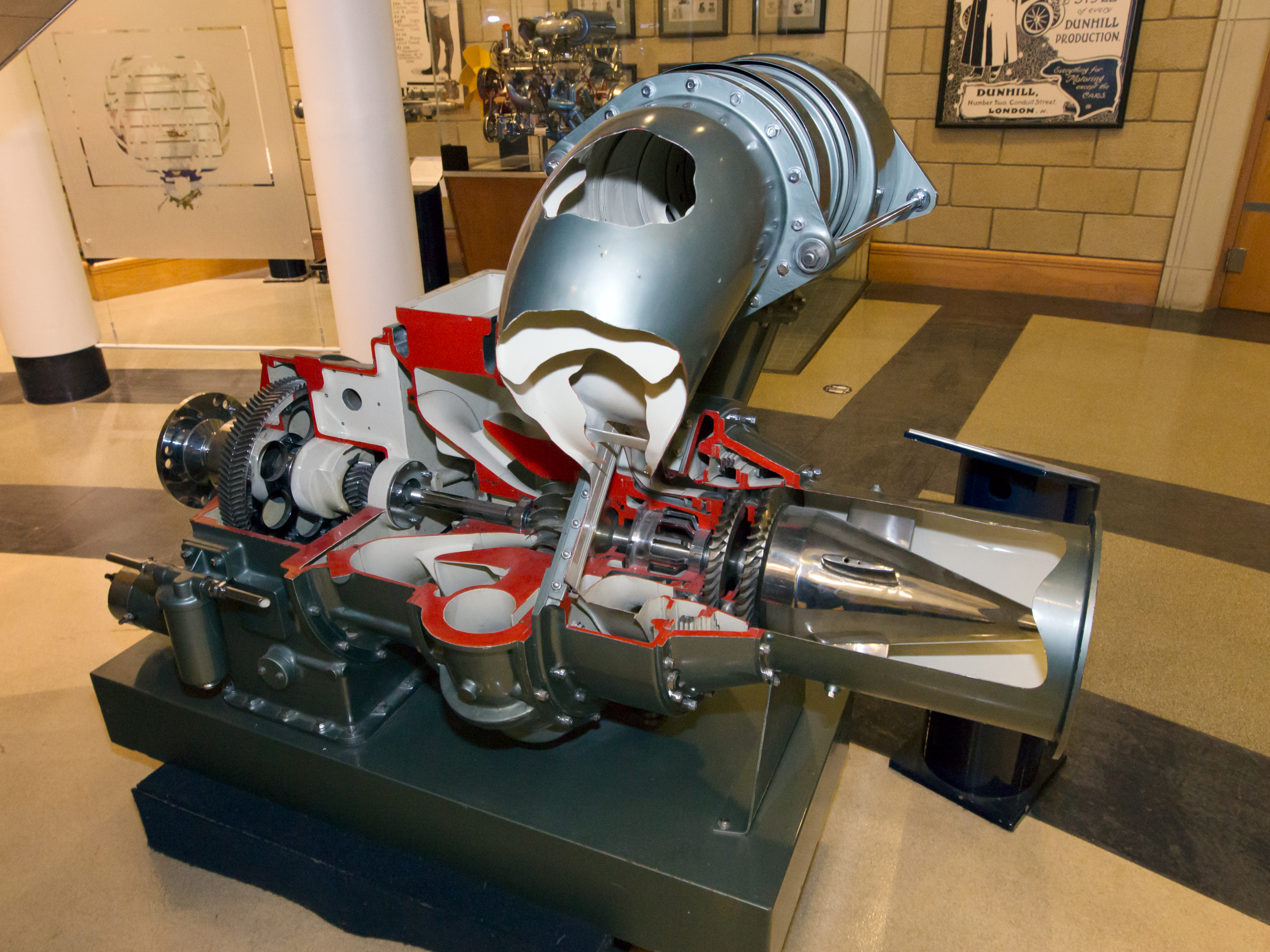
The Austin 250hp gas turbine (seen sectioned) was intended for motor vehicles

== History ==
The first gas turbine engine considered for an armoured fighting vehicle, the GT 101 which was based on the BMW 003 turbojet, was tested in a Panther tank in mid-1944. The first turboshaft engine for rotorcraft was built by the French engine firm Turbomeca, led by its founder Joseph Szydlowski. In 1948, they built the first French-designed turbine engine, the 100-shp 782. Originally conceived as an auxiliary power unit, it was soon adapted to aircraft propulsion, and found a niche as a powerplant for turboshaft-driven helicopters in the 1950s. In 1950, Turbomeca used its work from the 782 to develop the larger 280-shp Artouste, which was widely used on the Aérospatiale Alouette II and other helicopters. This was following the experimental installation of a Boeing T50 turboshaft in an example of the Kaman K-225 synchropter on December 11, 1951, as the world's first-ever turboshaft-powered helicopter of any type to fly.

The T-80 tank, which entered service with the Soviet Army in 1976, was the first tank to use a gas turbine as its main engine. Since 1980 the US Army has operated the M1 Abrams tank, which also has a gas turbine engine. (Most tanks use reciprocating piston diesel engines.) The Swedish Stridsvagn 103 was the first tank to utilize a gas turbine as a secondary, high-horsepower "sprint" engine to augment its primary piston engine's performance. The turboshaft engines used in all these tanks have considerably fewer parts than the piston engines they replace or supplement, mechanically are very reliable, produce reduced exterior noise, and run on virtually any fuel: petrol (gasoline), diesel fuel, and aviation fuels. However, turboshaft engines have significantly higher fuel consumption than the diesel engines that are used in the majority of modern main battle tanks.

== See also ==
- Jet engine
- Wave disk engine
- MTT Turbine Superbike, a turboshaft-powered superbike
- Turbine-electric transmission
