= Free-turbine turboshaft =

Turboshaft with power from independent exhaust

Simplified turboshaft engine, with a rear driveshaft, such as for a helicopter. The compressor spool, turbine and compressor, is in green. The free power turbine is in purple.

A free-turbine turboshaft is a form of turboshaft or turboprop gas turbine engine where the power is extracted from the exhaust stream of a gas turbine by an independent turbine, downstream of the gas turbine. The power turbine is not mechanically connected to the turbines that drive the compressors, hence the term "free", referring to the independence of the power output shaft (or spool). This is opposed to the power being extracted from the turbine/compressor shaft via a gearbox.

The advantage of the free turbine is that the two turbines can operate at different speeds and that these speeds can vary relative to each other. This is particularly advantageous for varying loads, such as turboprop engines.

== Design ==
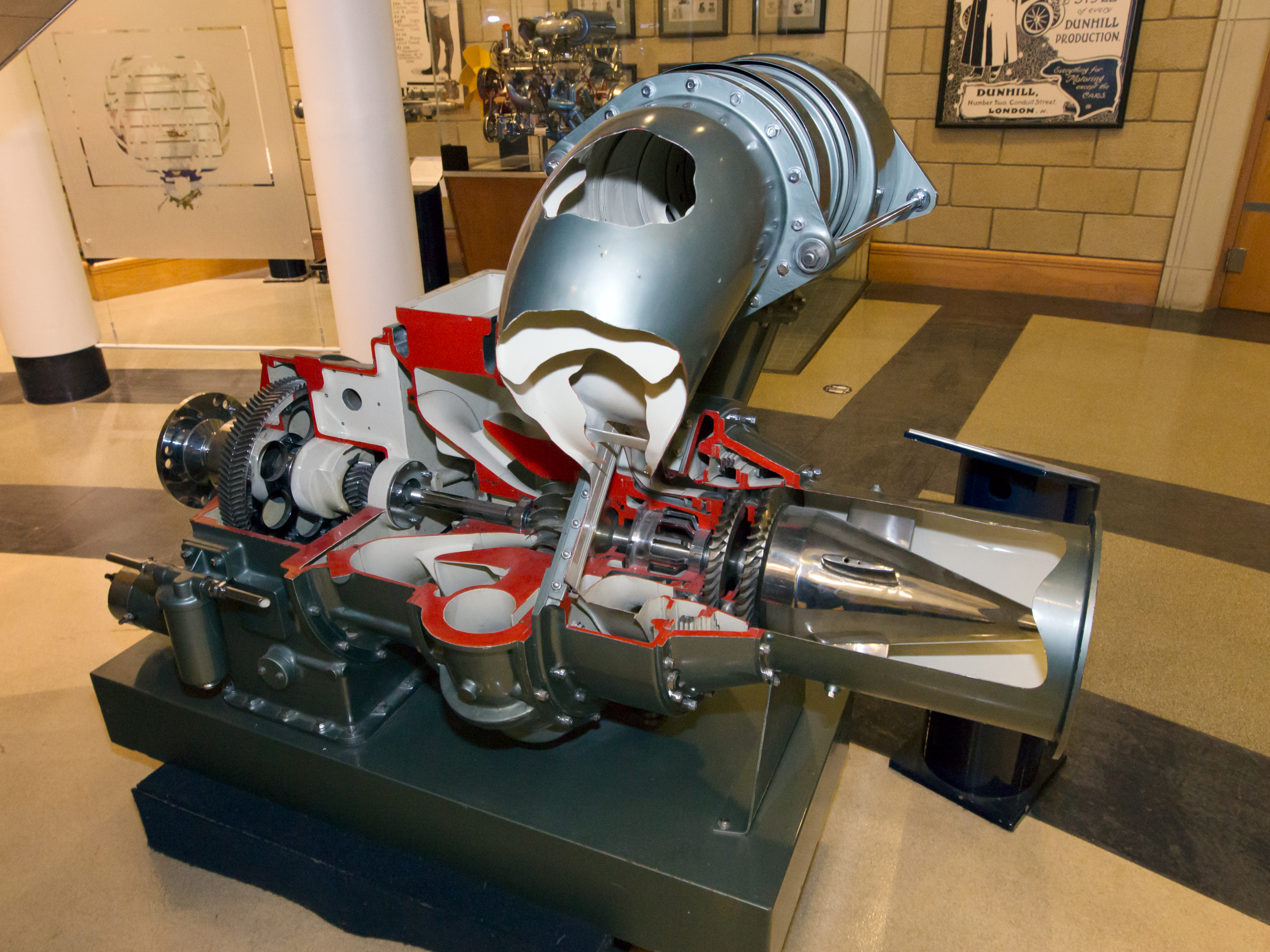
Austin 250hp gas turbine, sectioned

A free-turbine turboshaft ingests air through an intake. The air passes through a compressor and into a combustor where fuel is mixed with the compressed air and ignited. The combustion gases are expanded through a compressor-driving turbine, and then through a "free" power turbine before being exhausted to the atmosphere. The compressor and its turbine are connected by a common shaft which, together with the combustor, is known as a gas generator, which is modelled using the Brayton cycle. The (free) power turbine is on a separate shaft.

Turboshaft engines are sometimes characterized by the number of spools. This refers to the number of compressor-and-turbine assemblies in the gas generator stage and does not include the free power turbine assembly. As an example, the General Electric T64 is a single-spool design that uses a 14-stage axial compressor; the independent power shaft is coaxial with the gas generator shaft.

=== Risk of overspeed ===
One particular failure scenario, a gearbox failure, showed a free-turbine arrangement to be more at risk than a single-shaft turboprop. It could suffer a turbine overspeed to destruction after losing its connection to the propeller load. In a single-shaft arrangement with a similar gearbox failure the turbine would still have most of its load from the compressor. Such a failure resulted in the 1954 accident of the second prototype Bristol Britannia, G-ALRX, which was forced to land in the Severn Estuary. A failure in the Bristol Proteus propeller reduction gearbox led to an overspeed and release of the power turbine of Nº3 engine. It cut through the oil tank and started a fire that threatened the integrity of the wing spar. The pilot, Bill Pegg, made a forced landing on the estuary mud. The Proteus gears were redesigned and an emergency fuel shut-off device was fitted to prevent a similar reoccurrence. Writing in 1994, Gunston found it remarkable that protection was not common on free-turbine engines. However, certification regulations allow other methods for preventing excessive overspeed such as disc rubbing and blade interference.

== Applications ==
Most turboshaft and turboprop engines now use free turbines. This includes those for static power generation, as marine propulsion and particularly for helicopters.

=== Helicopters ===
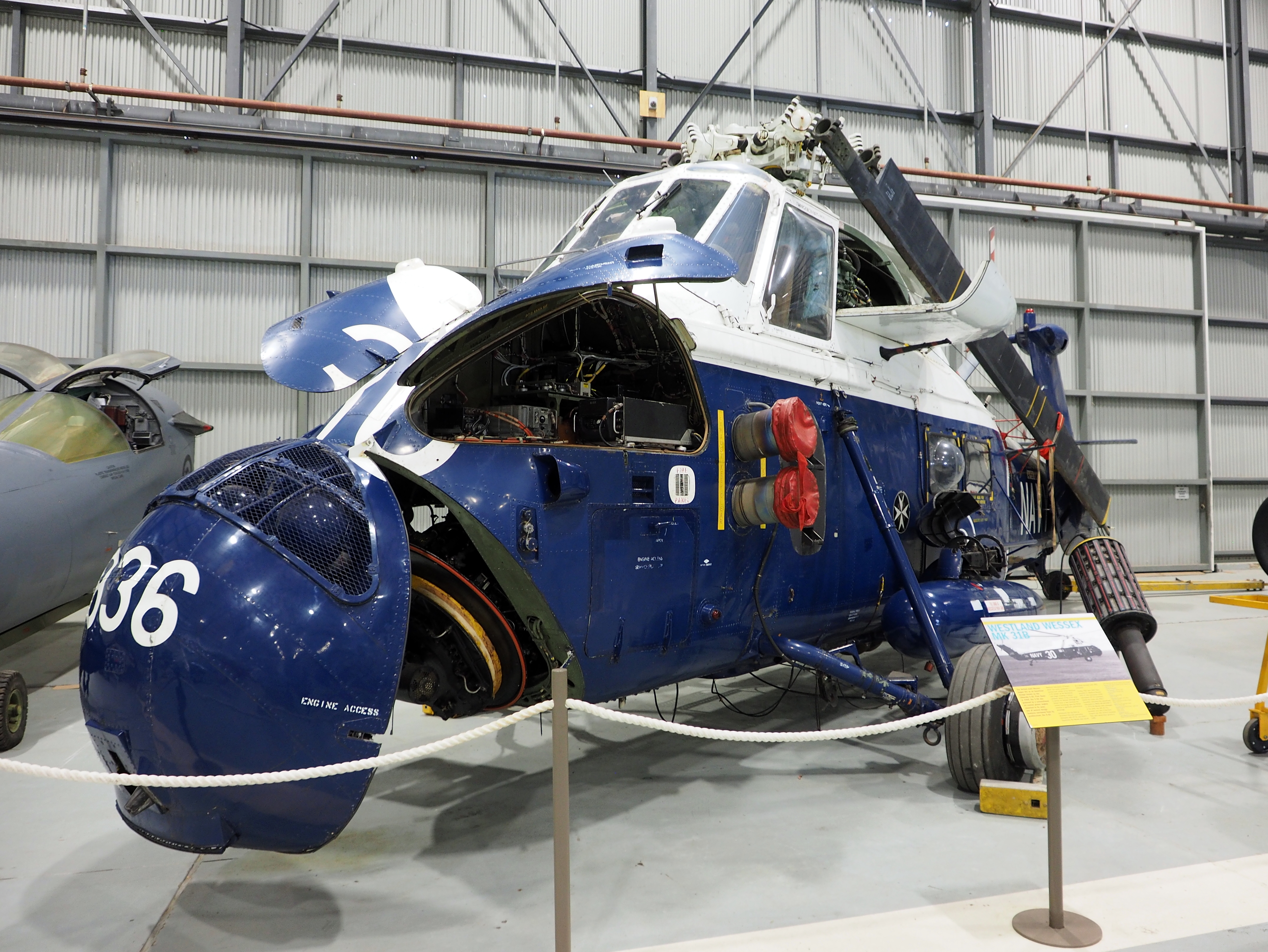
Wessex HAS.31B showing the circumferential air intake of the Gazelle and the two exhausts (red covers) per side

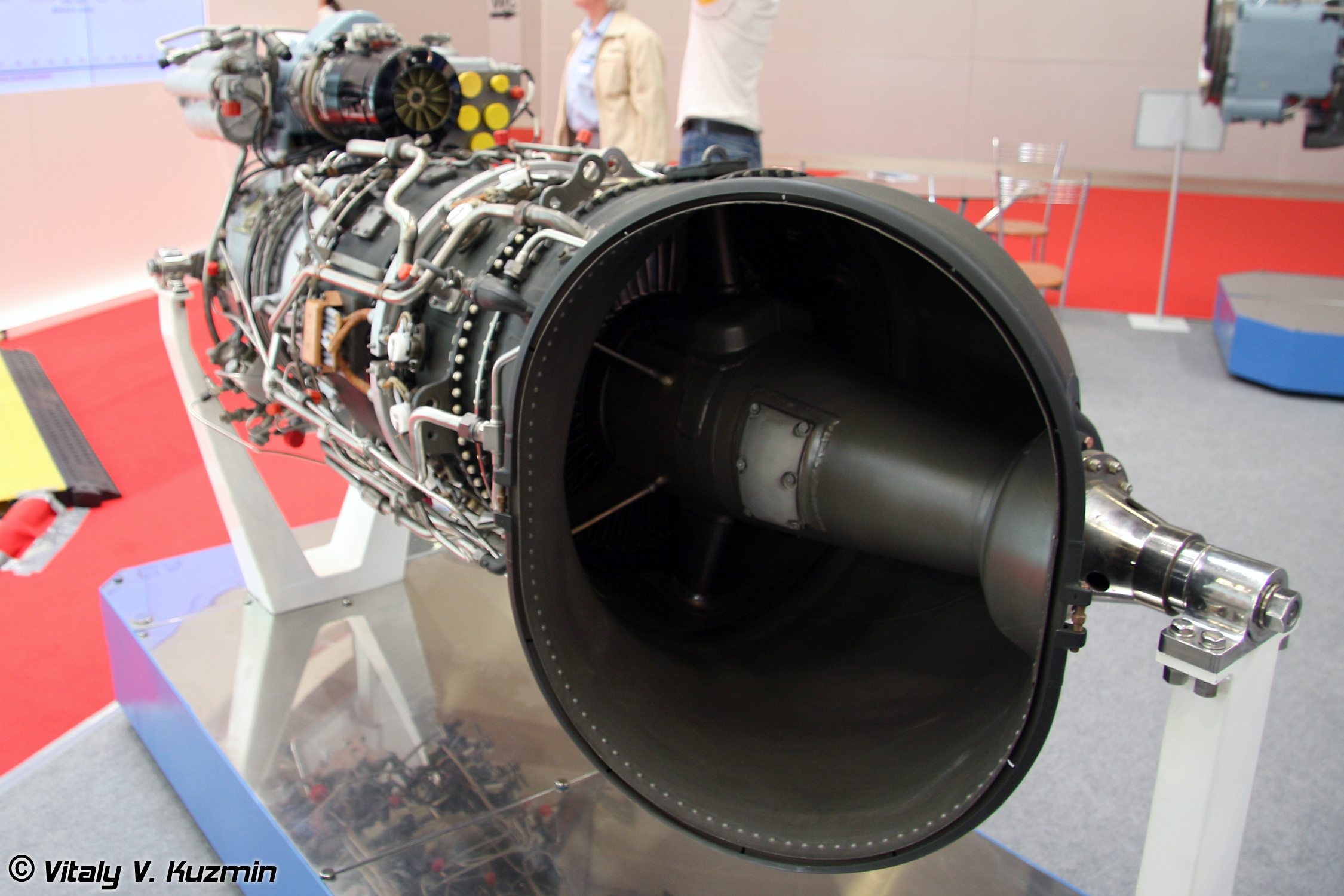
Ukrainian MS-14VM helicopter engine, with typical side-mounted exhaust and with the output power shaft from the turbine passing through it

Helicopters are a major market for turboshaft engines. When turboshaft engines became available in the 1950s, they were rapidly adopted for both new designs and as replacements for piston engines. They offered more power and far better power to weight ratios. Piston helicopters of this period had barely adequate performance; the switch to a turbine engine could both reduce several hundred pounds of engine weight, 600 lb (270 kg) for the Napier Gazelle of the Westland Wessex, and also allow considerably more payload weight. For the Westland Whirlwind, this converted the inadequate piston-engined HAS.7 to the de Havilland Gnome turbine-powered HAR.9. As one of the first anti-submarine helicopters, the HAS.7 had been so weight restricted that it could carry either a search sonar or a torpedo, but not both.

The free-turbine engine was found to be particularly suitable. It does not need a clutch, as the gas generator may be started while the output shaft remains stationary. For the Wessex, this was used to give a particularly fast take-off from a cold start. By locking the main rotor (and the power turbine) with the rotor brake, the engine could be started and then, with the gas generator at a speed of 10,500 rpm, the brake released allowing the power turbine to accelerate and bring the rotor to its operating speed from stationary in just 15 seconds and a time from engine start to take-off of only 30 seconds.

A further advantage of the free turbine design was the ease with which a counter-rotating engine could be designed and manufactured, simply by reversing the power turbine alone. This allowed handed engines to be made in pairs when needed. It also allowed contra-rotating engines, where the gas generator core and power turbine revolved in opposite directions, reducing the overall moment of inertia. For the helicopter engine replacement market, this ability allowed previous engines of either direction to be replaced simply. Some turboshaft engines' omni-angle freedom of their installation angle also allowed installation into existing helicopter designs, no matter how the previous engines had been arranged. In time though, the move towards axial LP compressors and so smaller diameter engines encouraged a move to the now-standard layout of one or two engines set side-by-side, horizontally above the cabin.

=== Aircraft ===
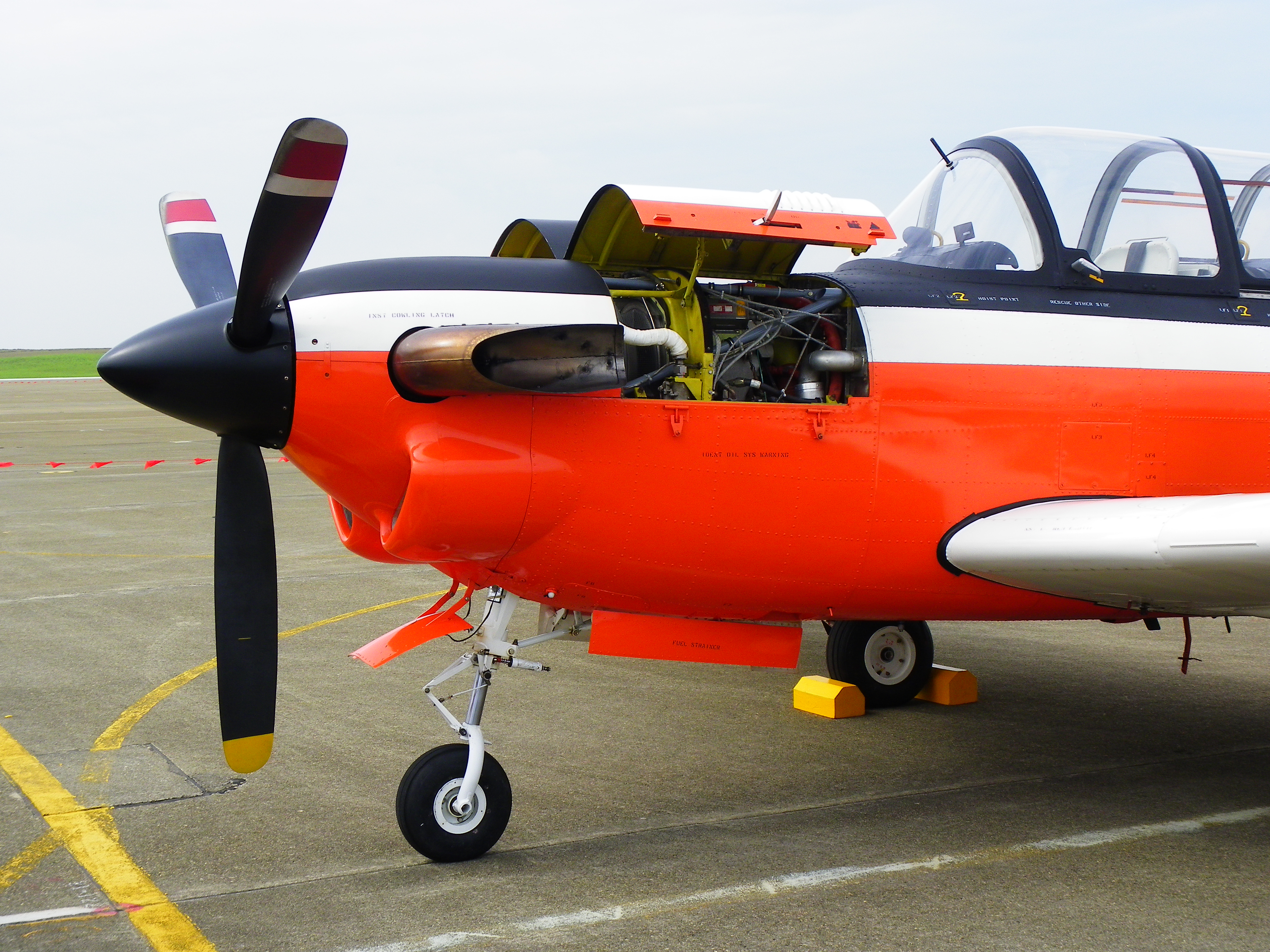
Beech T-34C with PT-6 engine, showing the exhaust elbows ahead of the engine

Turboprop aircraft are still powered by a range of free- and non-free turbine engines. Larger engines have mostly retained the non-free design, although many are two-shaft designs where the 'power' turbine drives the propeller and the low-pressure compressor while the high-pressure compressor has its own turbine.

The first free-turbine gas turbine engine was the Bristol Theseus turboprop. This was the first Bristol gas turbine and its broad design had been produced by Frank Owner at Tockington Manor. It first ran in July 1945 and in December 1946 was the first turboprop to pass a 100 hour type test.

Some large turboprop engines, such as the original Bristol Proteus and the modern TP400 have free turbines. The TP400 is a three-shaft design, with two compressor turbines and a separate power turbine. Where the turbine is at the rear of the engine, a turboprop engine requires a long drive shaft forwards to the propeller reduction gearbox. Such long shafts can be a difficult design problem and must carefully control any shaft vibration.

For small turboprop engines, the free-turbine design has come to dominate and these designs are also mostly reversed overall, with their air inlet and compressor to the rear, feeding forwards to hot section and power turbine at the front. This places the turbine output close to the propeller gearbox, avoiding the need for a long driveshaft. Such engines are often recognisable externally, as they use external 'elbow' exhausts ahead of the main engine. A particularly common example of this is the PT6 engine, of which over 50,000 have been produced.

==== Pusher propfans ====
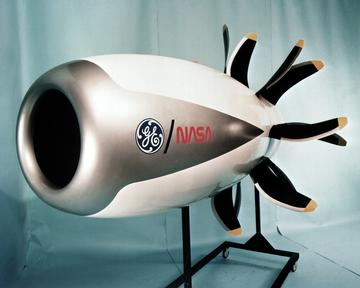
GE36 unducted fan

An attractively simple configuration making use of the free turbine is the propfan engine, with a rear-mounted unducted fan in pusher configuration, rather than the more familiar tractor layout. The first such engine was the very early and promising Metropolitan-Vickers F.3 of 1942 with a ducted fan, followed by the unducted and much lighter F.5. Development of these engines stopped abruptly owing to corporate takeovers, rather than technical reasons. Rolls-Royce continued with design studies for such engines into the 1980s, as did GE, but they have yet to appear as commercial engines.

The advantage of the pusher propfan with a free power turbine is its simplicity. The prop blades are attached directly to the outside of the rotating turbine disc. No gearboxes or drive shafts are required. The short length of the rotating components also reduces vibration. The static structure of the engine over this length is a large diameter tube within the turbine. In most designs, two contra-rotating rings of turbine and propeller are used. Intermeshed contra-rotating turbines can act as the guide vanes for each other, removing the need for static vanes.

=== Land and sea ===
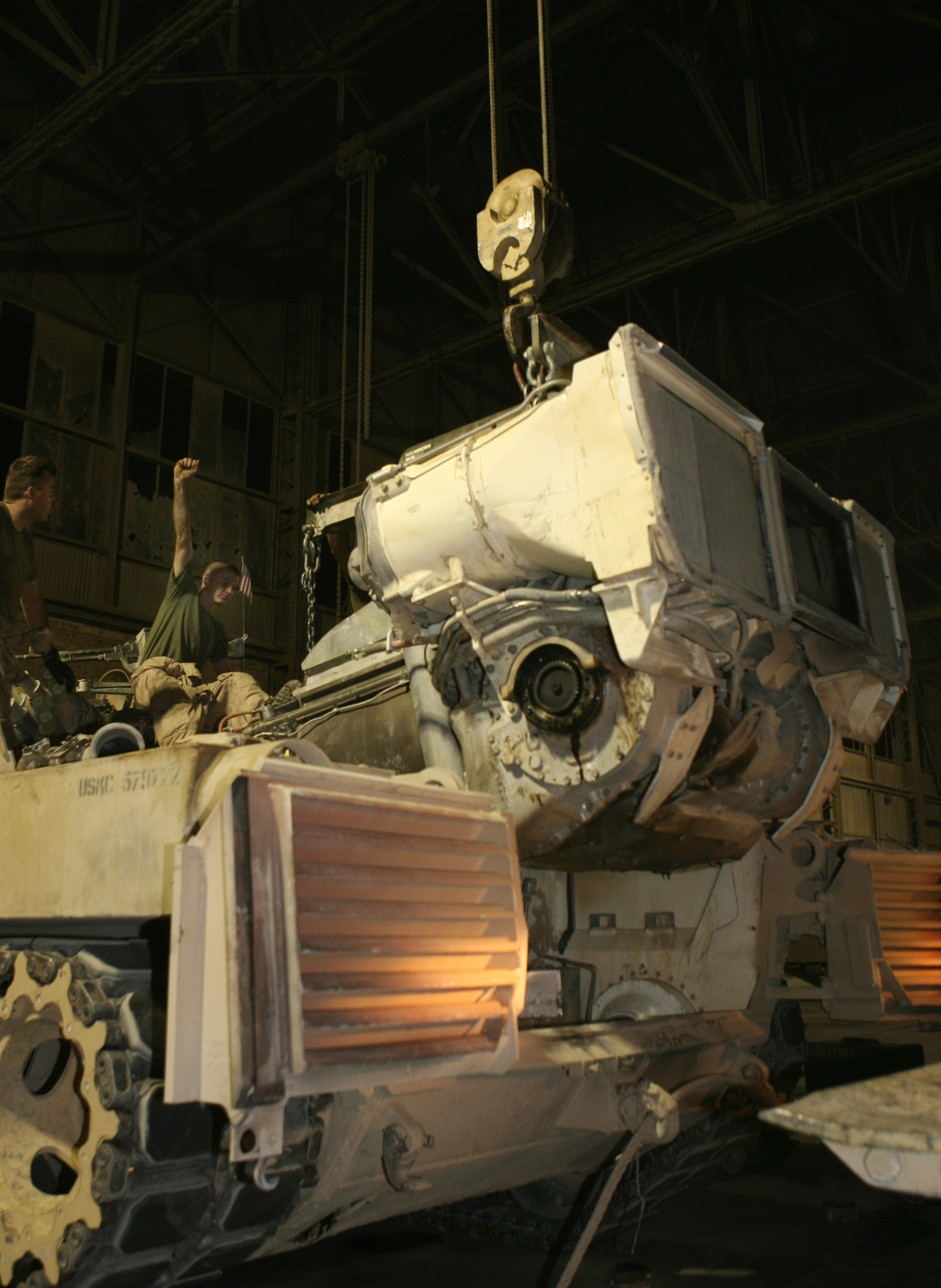
Changing the AGT1500 turbine in an M1 Abrams tank

The M1 Abrams main battle tank is powered by a Honeywell AGT1500 (formerly Textron Lycoming) two-spool gas turbine engine. A commercial derivative has been designed as the TF15 for marine and railroad applications, and a flight-rated version, the PLT27, was also developed but lost a major contract to the GE T700 turboshaft.

Turboshaft engines were used to power several gas turbine locomotives, most notably using the Turbomeca Turmo in Turbotrain (France) and Turboliner (United States) service.

== See also ==
- Air turborocket
- Free-piston engine
- Motorjet
- Rocket turbine engine
- Turbo-compound engine
