= Gifu-Kakamigahara Air and Space Museum =

Japanese aviation museum

- 岐阜かかみがはら航空宇宙博物館

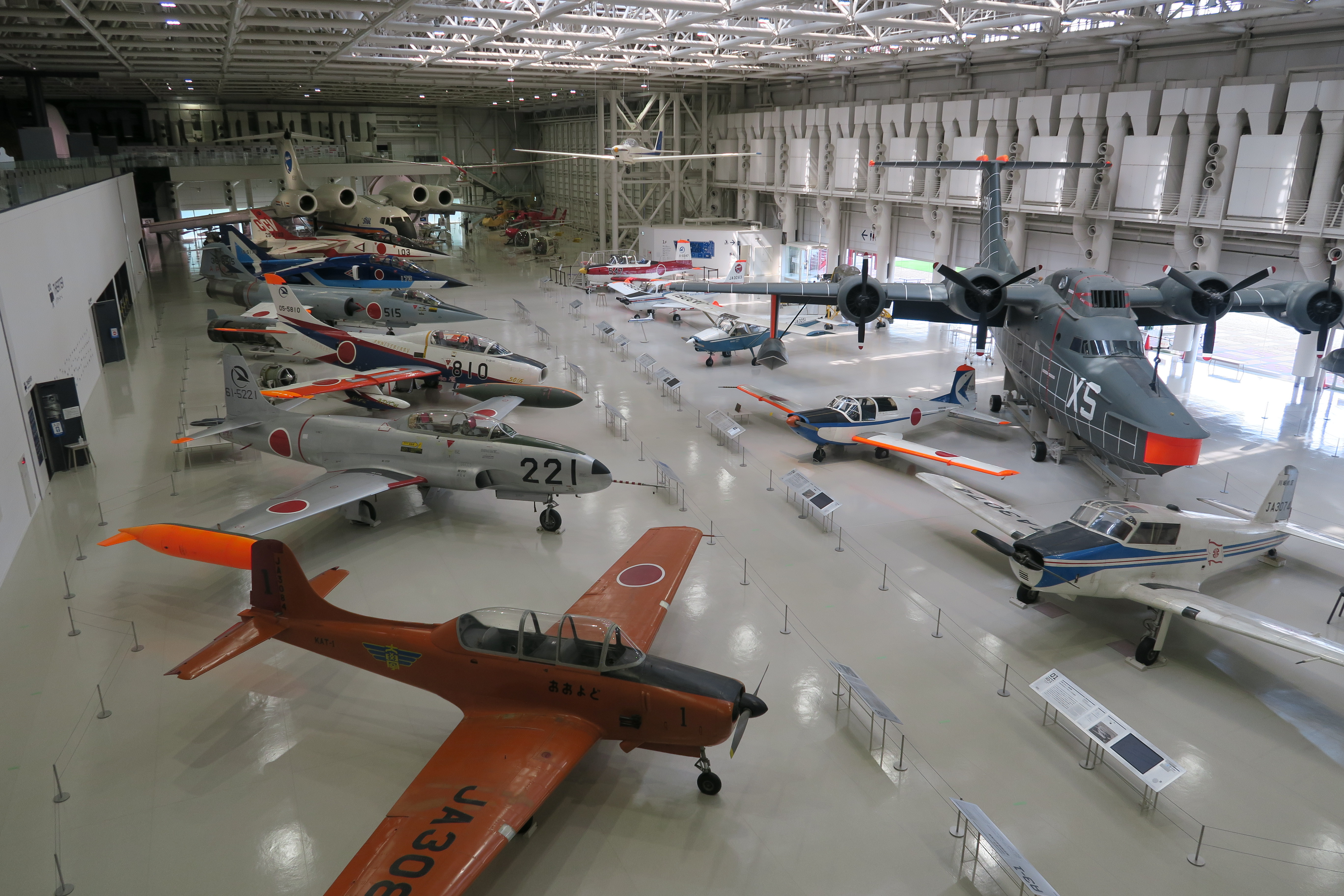
- Fuji T-1B 05-5810 of AD&TW at Gifu-Kakamigahara Air and Space Museum

- Gifu-Kakamigahara Air and Space Museum Gifu-Kakamigahara Air and Space Museum (Japan)
- Former name: Kakamigahara Aerospace Museum
- Established: March 23, 1996
- Location: 5-1 Shimokiri-cho Kakamigahara, Gifu, Japan 504-0924
- Coordinates: 35°23′17.1″N 136°51′44.9″E
- Type: Aerospace Museum
- Website: https://www.sorahaku.net/

Gifu-Kakamigahara Air and Space Museum is an aviation museum located in Kakamigahara in Gifu Prefecture in Japan. It is at Gifu Air Field of the Japan Air Self-Defense Force.

== Overview ==
The museum features outdoor and indoor exhibits, featuring aviation and space displays about the history and stories on the development of aviation technology, and information on the latest space technology.

Named originally Kakamigahara Aerospace Museum and later Kakamigahara Aerospace Science Museum, it was jointly established by Kakamigahara City and Gifu Prefecture and renamed Gifu-Kakamigahara Aerospace Museum after extensive renovation in 2018.

== Aircraft on display ==
=== Outdoor Exhibits ===
- Kawasaki V-107
- NAMC YS-11
- ShinMeiwa US-1A

=== Indoor Exhibits ===
- HOPE-X (wind tunnel model)
- Wright Flyer (replica)
- Grade monoplane (replica)
- Salmson 2 (replica)
- Mitsubishi A6M Zero (replica)
- Kawasaki Ki-61 (the sole surviving aircraft of this type)
- Kawasaki KAL-1
- Kawasaki KAT-1
- Lockheed T-33
- SAAB X1G
- Fuji Heavy Industries T-1
- JAMCO N-62 Eaglet
- ShinMaywa UF-XS
- Fuji Heavy Industries FA-200
- Fuji Heavy Industries T-3
- Mitsubishi T-2
- Mitsubishi T-2 CCV
- Kawasaki Asuka
- Nihon N-70 Cygnus
- Kawasaki BK 117
- Kawasaki OH-1 (mockup)
- Kawasaki KH-4
- Hughes OH-6 Cayuse
- Lockheed F-104J Starfighter

== Gallery ==
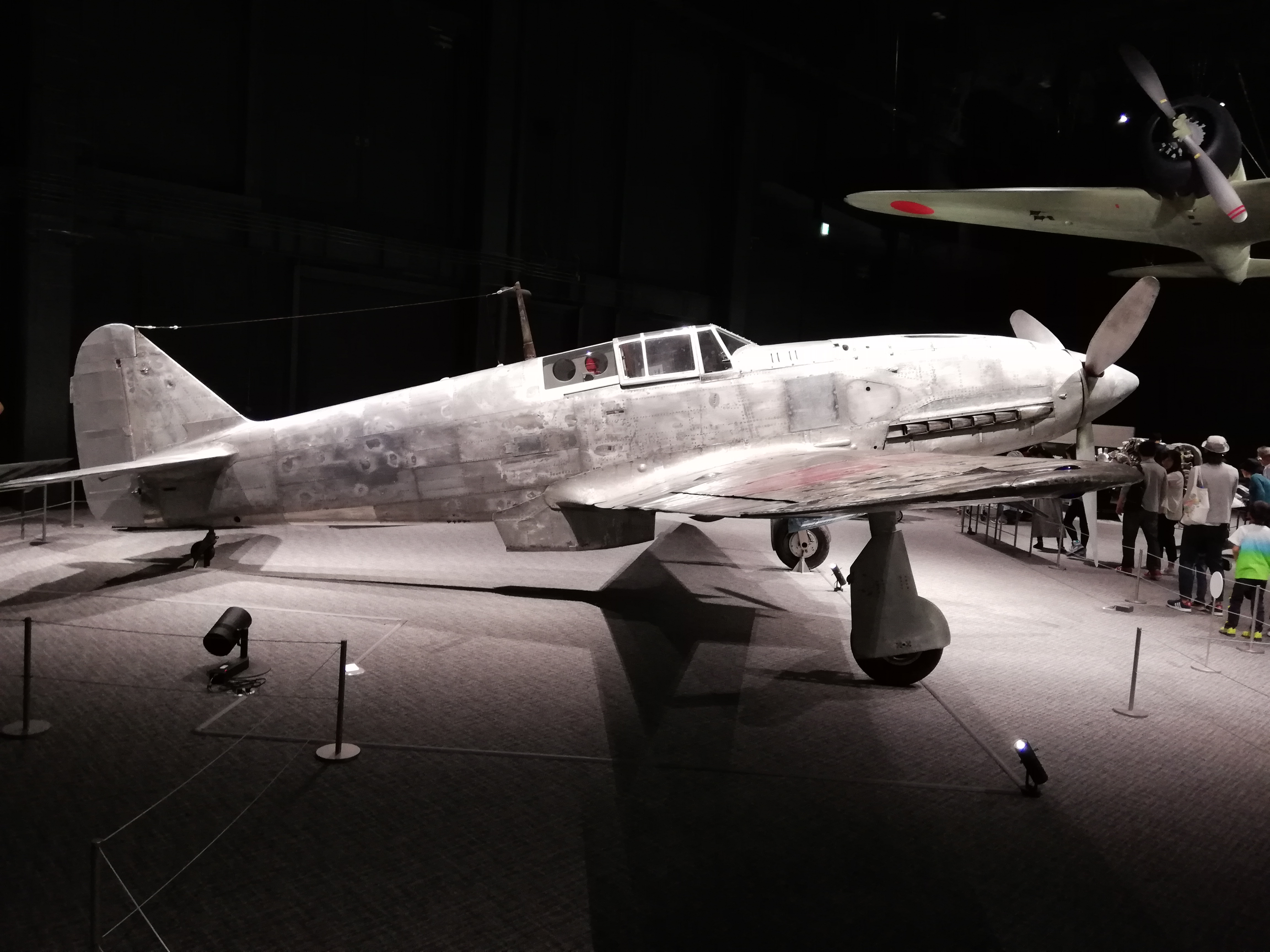
Kawasaki Ki-61

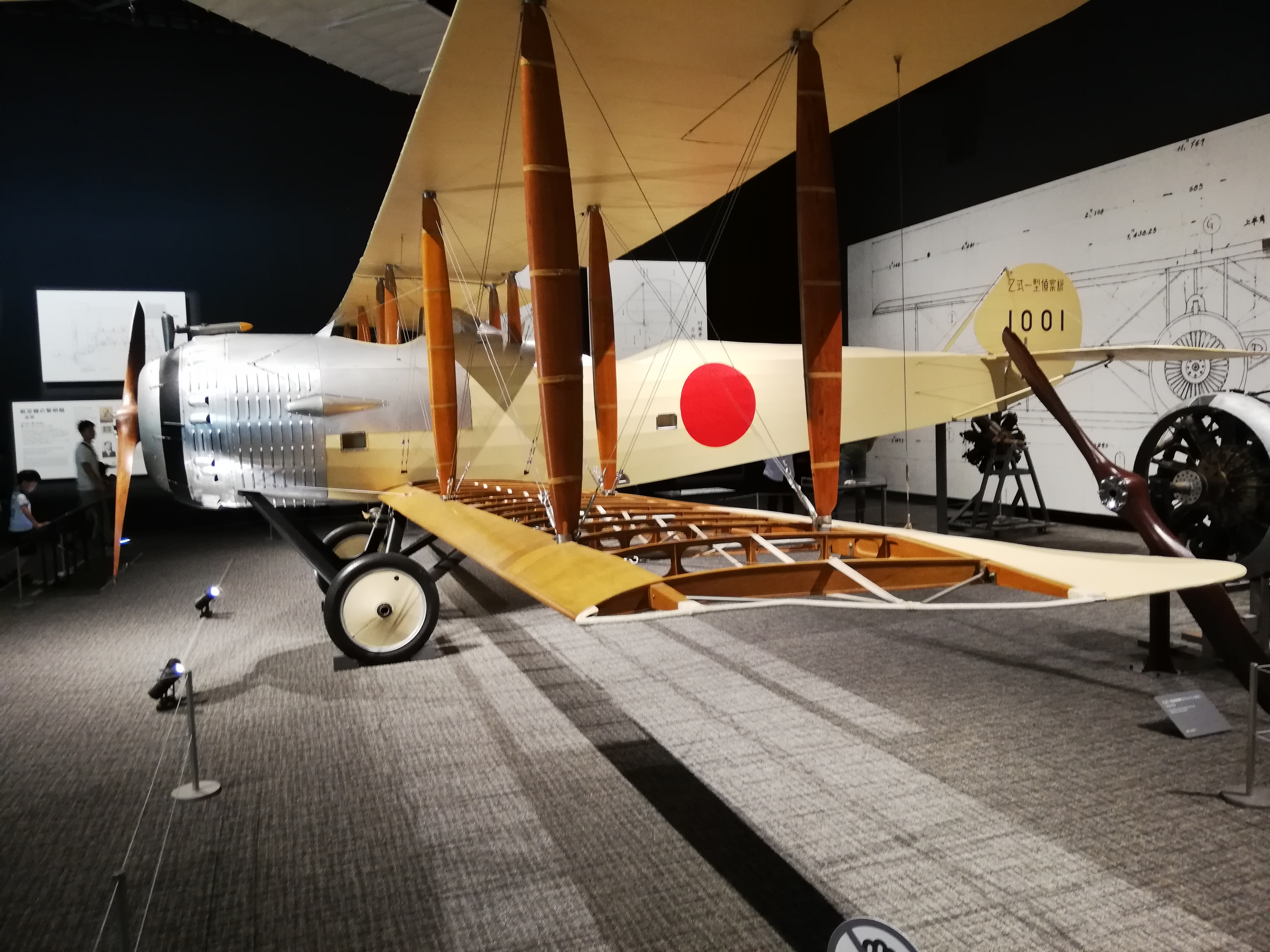
Salmson 2 (replica)

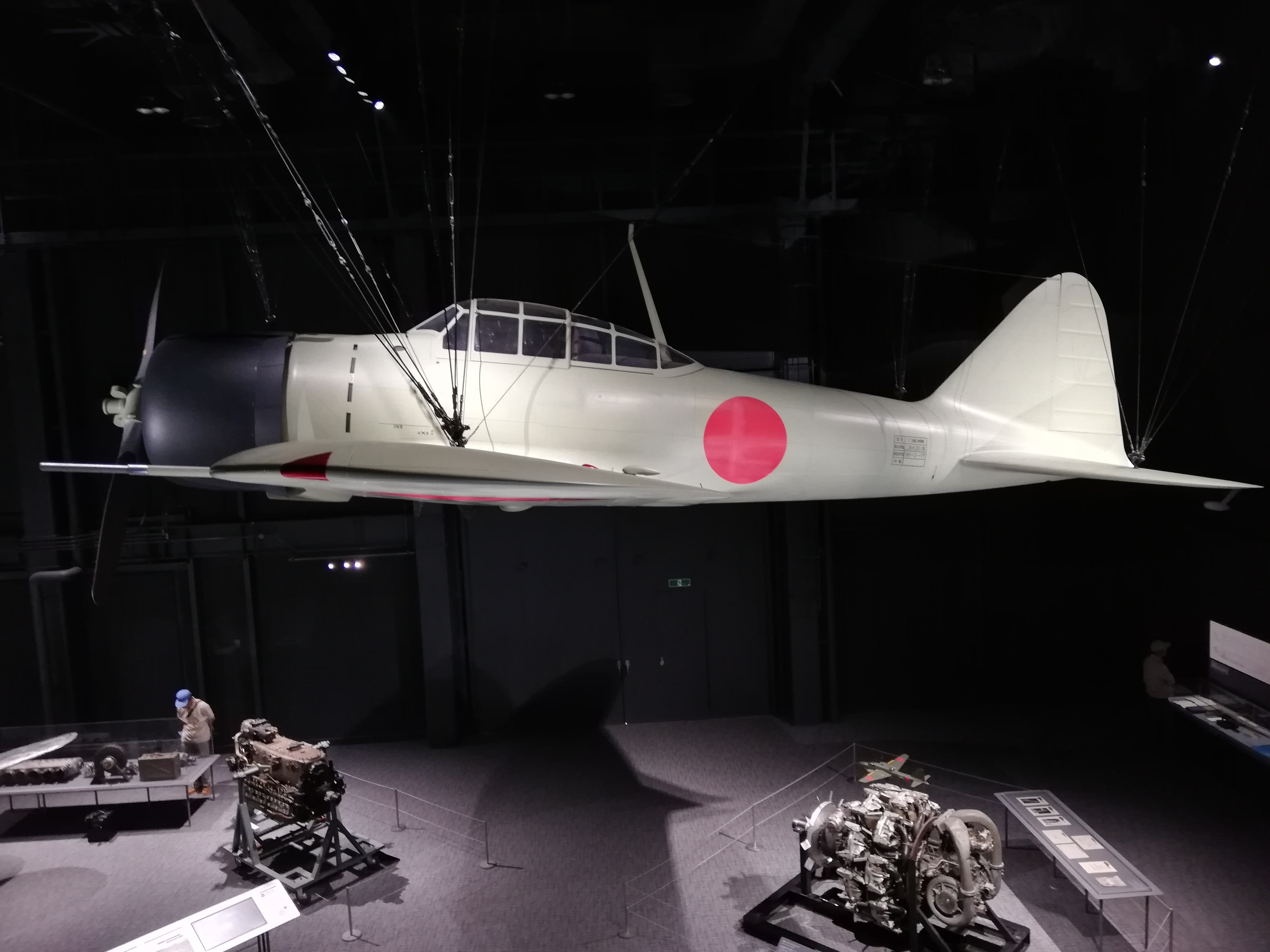
Mitsubishi A6M1 (replica)

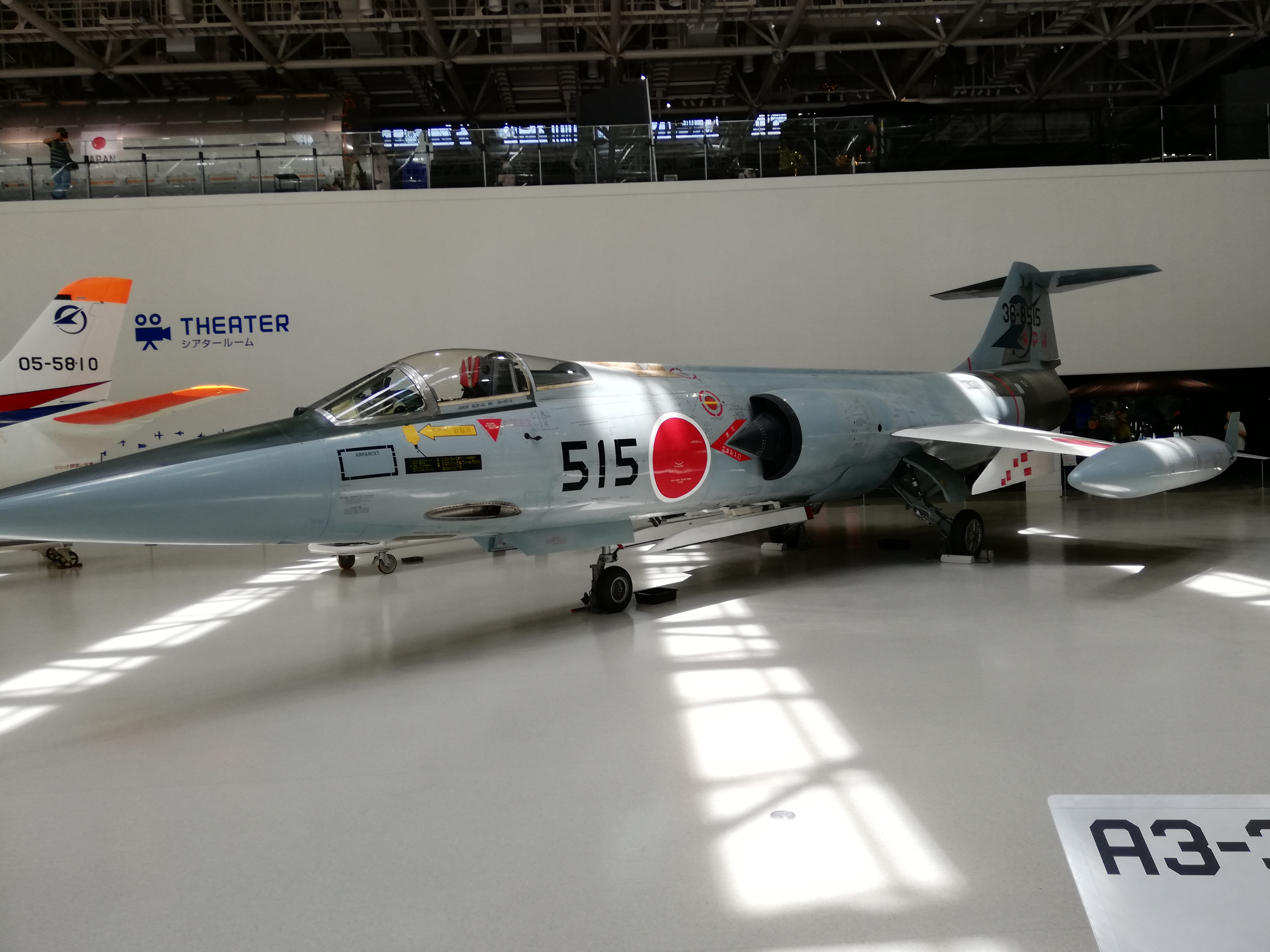
F-104J

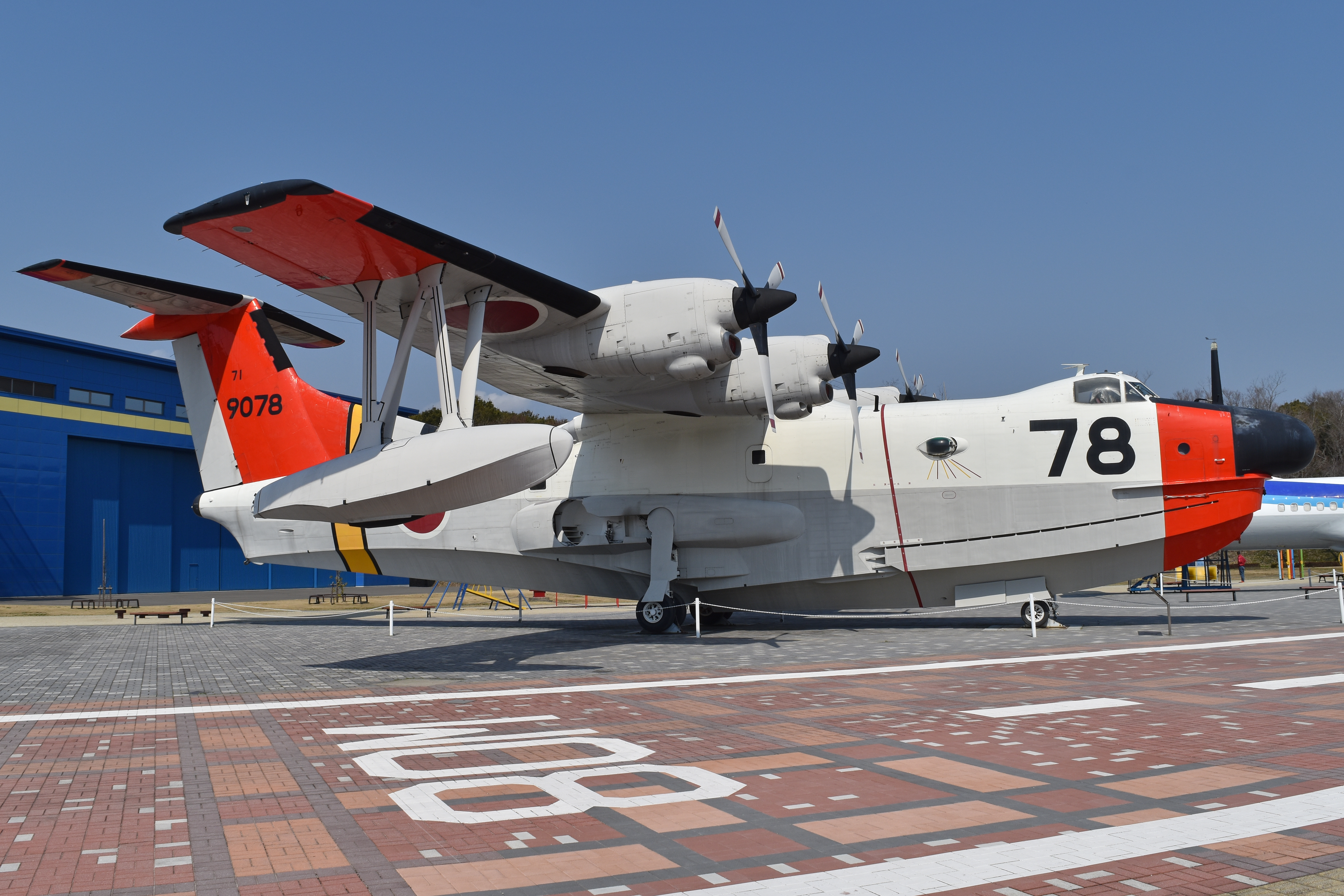
shin Meiwa US-1A

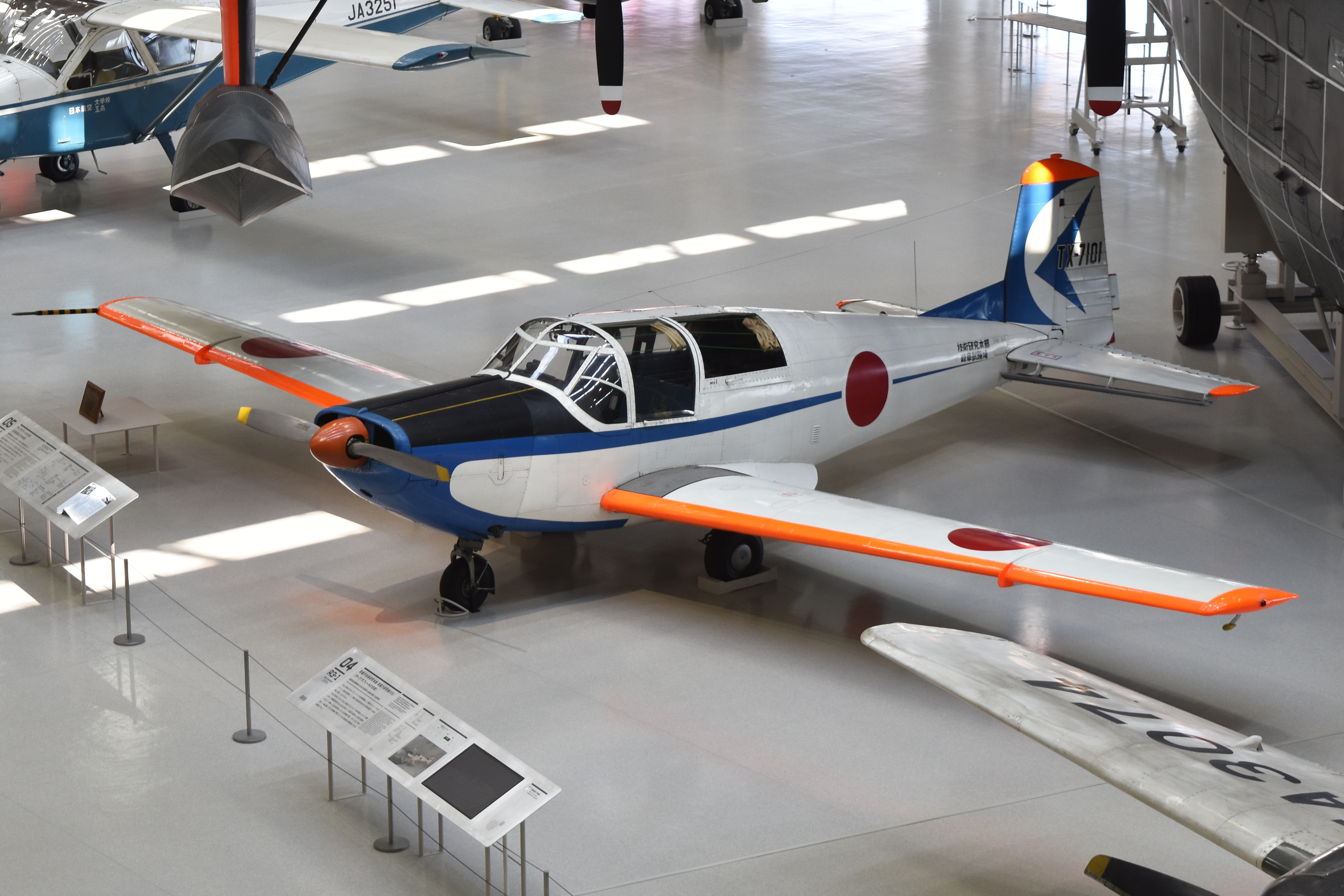
Saab 91 X1G1B

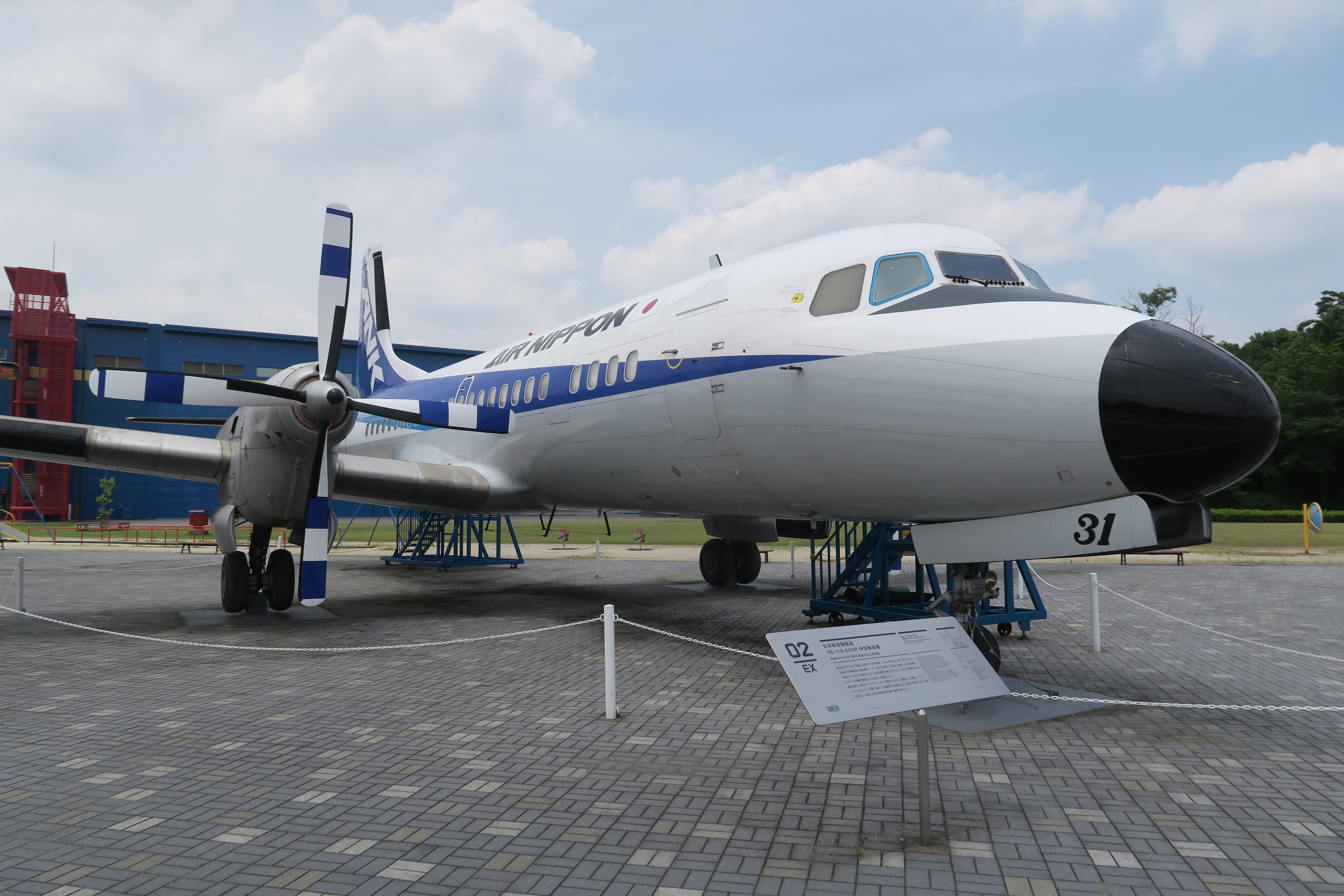
NAMC YS-11
