= Ishikawajima-Harima J3 =

1960s Japanese turbojet aircraft engine

J3
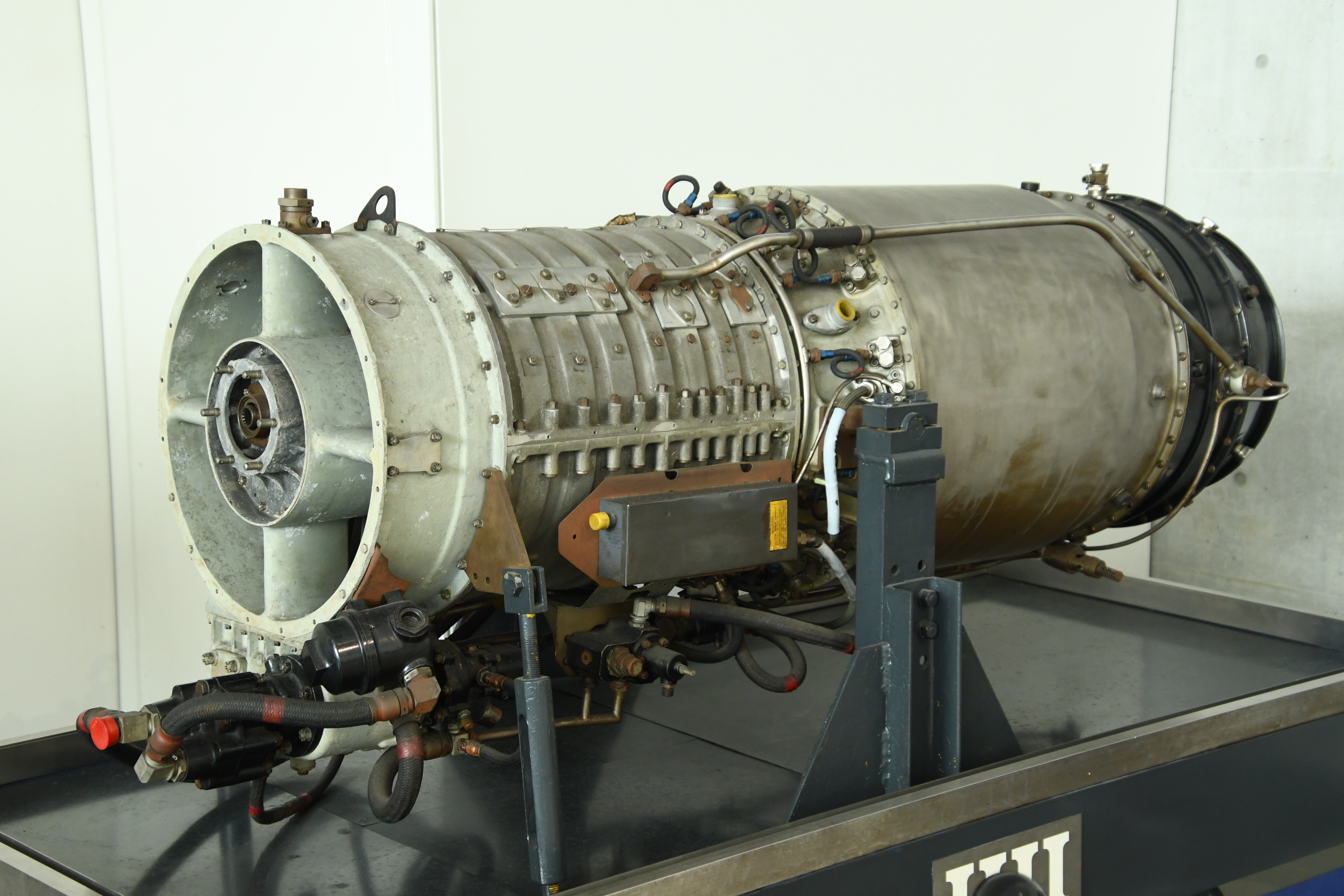
- Type: Turbojet
- National origin: Japan
- Manufacturer: Ishikawajima-Harima
- Major applications: Fuji T-1; Kawasaki P-2J

The Ishikawajima-Harima J3 was a Japanese turbojet aircraft engine. It was the first jet engine designed and built in Japan after the Second World War and was used to power the Fuji T-1 trainer and as a booster engine in the Kawasaki P-2J patrol aircraft.

== Design and development ==
Development of the J3, the first Japanese post-war jet engine, intended to power the Fuji T-1 jet trainer, was begun in 1955 by the Nippon Jet-Engine Company, with Ishikawajima-Harima Heavy Industries (IHI) being designated prime contractor in 1959. The resulting engine was a small, simple axial-flow turbojet.

The first pre-production engine began flight testing in a Curtiss C-46 testbed in February 1960, with production deliveries beginning in April 1962.

== Operational history ==
While the J3 was designed to power the Fuji T-1, it was not ready in time and the first version of the T-1 was powered by imported British Bristol Orpheus engine. The J3-IHI-3 version of the engine equipped the later T-1B version. A more powerful version of the J3, the J3-IHI-7 was used to re-engine the T-1Bs and as booster engines for the Kawasaki P-2J maritime patrol aircraft.

== Variants ==
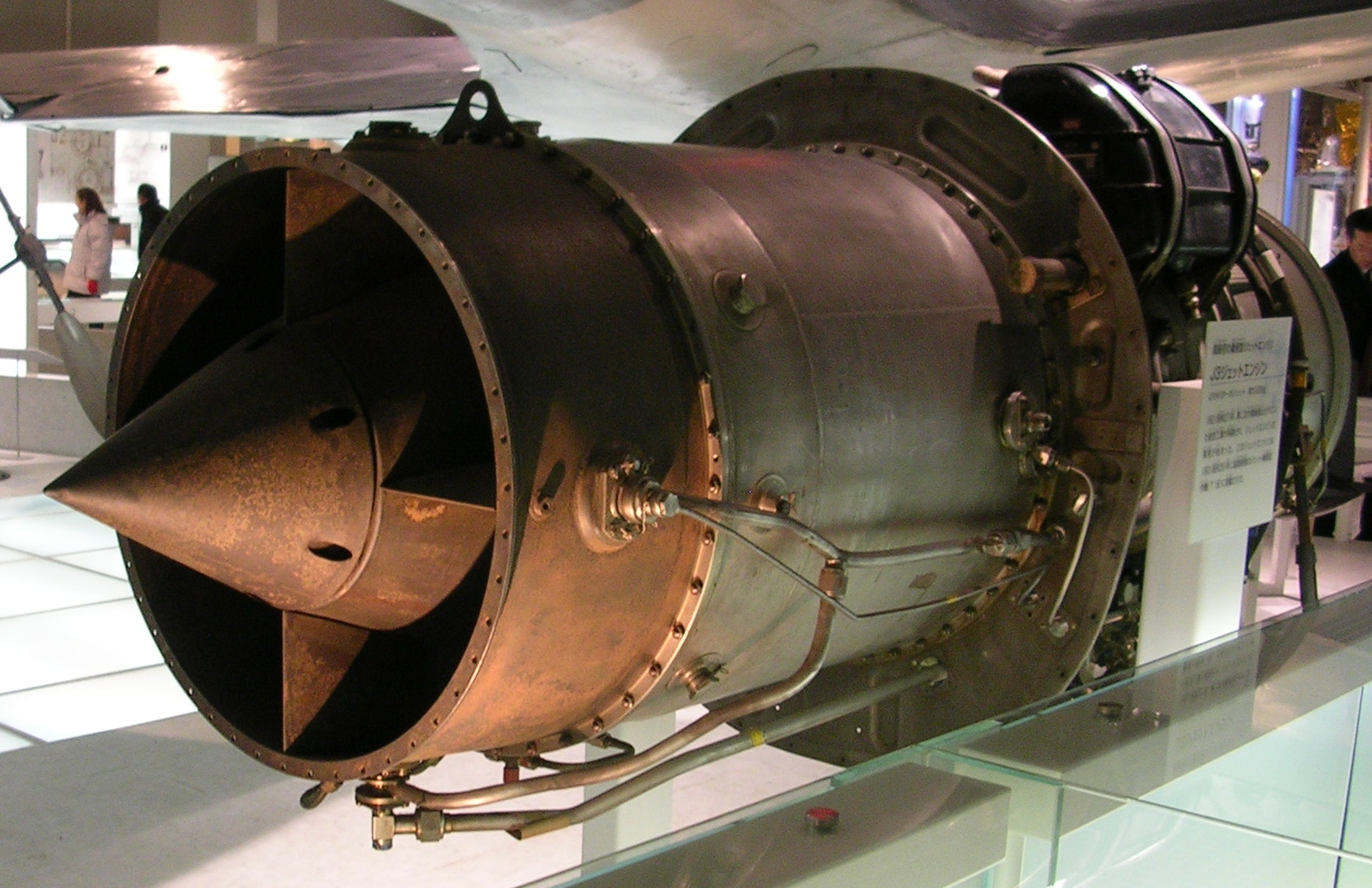

J3-1
Nippon Jet-Engine Company prototype.
J3-IHI-3
Initial production version for Fuji T-1B trainer. 11.8 kN (2,645 lbf) thrust.
J3-IHI-7
More powerful version used as auxiliary engine in the P-2J and to re-engine T-1B trainers. 13.7 kN (3,080 lbf) thrust.
J3-IHI-7C
13.7 kN (3,080 lbf) for take-off.
J3-IHI-8
15.19 kN (3,415 lbf) for take-off.
J3-IHI-F
Aft-fan variant, 16.7 kN (3,750 lbf). The later Ishikawajima-Harima F3 turbofan engine began flights in 1985.

== Applications ==
- Fuji T-1
- Kawasaki P-2J

== Specifications (J3-IHI-7C) ==
Data from Jane's All The World's Aircraft 1976–77

==== General characteristics ====
- Type: axial flow turbojet
- Length: 1,661 mm (65.4 in) (without tailpipe)
- Diameter: 627 mm (24.7 in)
- Dry weight: 430 kg (948 lb) (with accessories)

==== Components ====
- Compressor: eight-stage axial compressor
- Combustors: annular combustion chamber with 30 fuel supply pipes and vapouriser tubes
- Turbine: single-stage axial-flow
- Fuel type: JP-4 jet fuel

==== Performance ====
- Maximum thrust: 13.7 kN (3,080 lbf) (take-off power)
- Overall pressure ratio: 4.5:1
- Air mass flow: 25.4 kg/s (56 lb/s)
- Specific fuel consumption: 106.9 kg/kN hr (1.05 lb/lbf hr)
- Thrust-to-weight ratio: 3.2

== See also ==
Comparable engines

- Armstrong Siddeley Sapphire
- Rolls-Royce Avon

Related lists

- List of aircraft engines
