= Fuji T-1 =

Japanese jet trainer aircraft

T-1
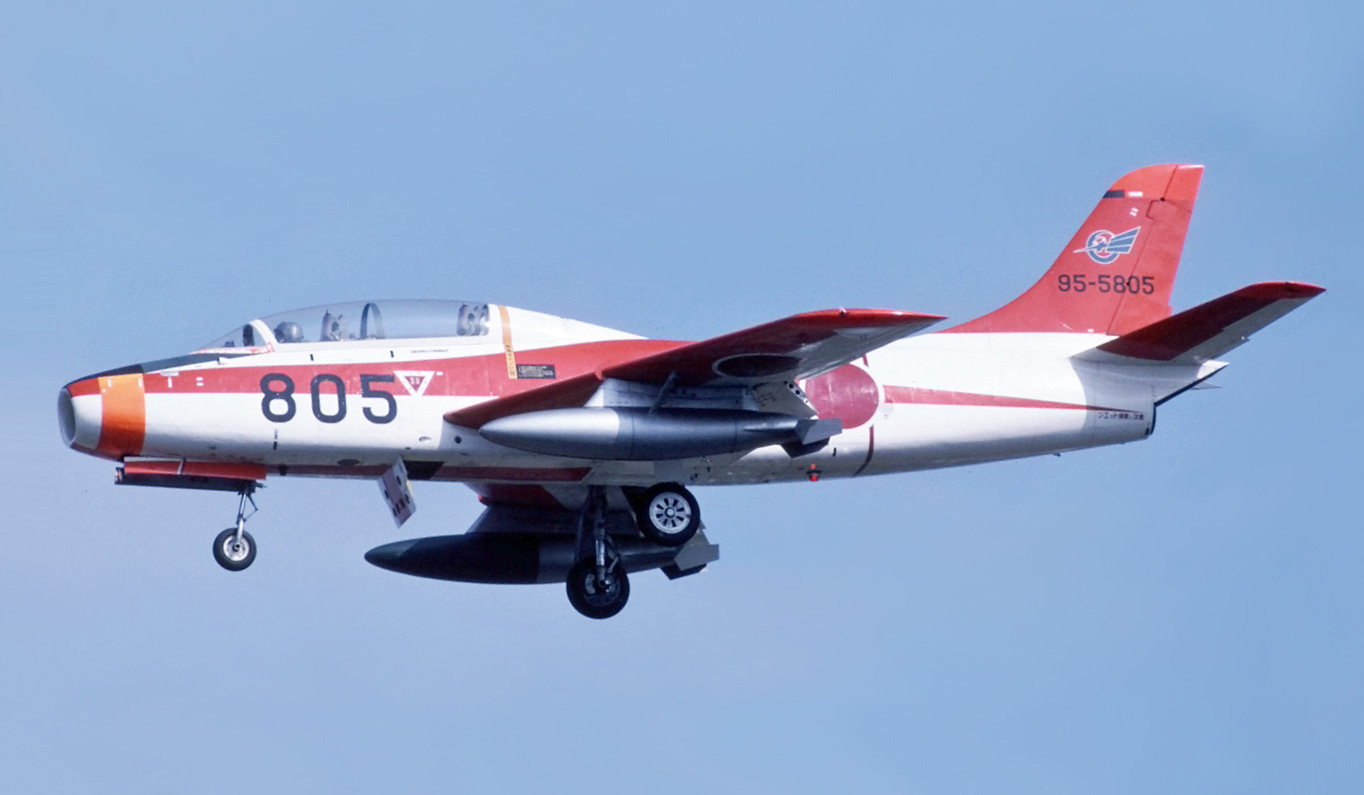
- T-1B in special paint scheme

General information
- Type: Intermediate trainer aircraft
- Manufacturer: Fuji Heavy Industries
- Primary user: Japan Air Self Defense Force (JASDF)
- Number built: 66

History
- Manufactured: 1962-1963
- First flight: 1 January 1958
- Retired: 3 March 2006

The Fuji T-1 Hatsutaka was a jet-powered trainer aircraft designed and produced by the Japanese conglomerate Fuji Heavy Industries. It was Japan's first jet-powered trainer aircraft as well as its first to make use of a swept wing.

The T-1 emerged out of the early post-war efforts to re-establish and advance Japan's indigenous aviation sector. The initiative to develop a domestic jet trainer was announced by the Japanese Defense Agency in early 1954; one year later, work on a suitable indigenous powerplant commenced. The rate of progress on this turbojet engine, the Ishikawajima-Harima J3, was not quick enough for the wider programme, thus initial aircraft, designated T-1A, were powered by the imported Bristol Siddeley Orpheus turbojet engine instead. During January 1958, one such aircraft performed the type's maiden flight. It was soon followed by the T-1B and T-1C variants.

Despite intentions to produce as many as 200 T-1 trainers for the Japan Air Self Defense Force (JASDF), a change in trainer needs and a decision to import the American Lockheed T-33A jet trainer undermined demand for the T-1. No international sales were secured for the type either. Ultimately, 66 T-1s were completed. Despite the type's curtailed production, it had a lengthy service life. The final examples were retired during March 2006, at which point the aircraft had been replaced by the newer Kawasaki T-4.

== Design and development ==
=== Background ===
In the aftermath of the Second World War, numerous restrictions were imposed upon Japan; these included a total ban on the Japanese aircraft industry from conducting research as well as the manufacture of materials and equipment related to aircraft. However, largely as a consequence of the Cold War and the Korean War, this position was progressively reversed. On 28 April 1952, the prohibition on aircraft manufacture was lifted, along with many of the restrictions on aeronautical research, which made it legally possible to domestically develop aircraft in Japan once more, as well as the associated technologies, such an indigenous jet engine. To this end, during July 1953, the Ishikawajima-Harima Heavy Industries, Mitsubishi, and Fuji Heavy Industries formed the Nippon Jet-Engine Company to develop a turbojet engine. Initial efforts proved to uncompetitive with imported models; however, further research work gained the support of the Japanese Defense Agency.

In the spring of 1954, the Defense Agency announced their intention to develop a domestic trainer jet aircraft. There were considerable political tensions over this ambition; while the Defense Agency and the Ministry of Finance were keen proponents of producing foreign-designed aircraft under licence to fulfil this need, the Ministry of International Trade and Industry strongly advocated for a locally-developed aircraft to be produced in order to support Japanese industry. Following a competition, Fuji's submission was selected to become the J-1.

The T-1 was the first indigenously designed Japanese jet aircraft to be developed since the Nakajima Kikka, which had entered the flight test phase of development during the final weeks of the Second World War. Furthermore, it was Japan's first mass-produced jet as well as the first Japanese aircraft to feature a swept wing. Its manufacturer, Fuji Heavy Industries, was the successor company to Nakajima Aircraft Company (famous for its combat aircraft, such as the Nakajima Ki-43 and Nakajima Ki-84 of the Second World War). The T-1 would be the first aircraft of Fuji's own design to attain quantity production.

=== Production arrangements ===
During 1955, the Defense Agency instructed the Nippon Jet-Engine Company to develop a suitable powerplant to power the indigenous trainer jet - this work would result in the Ishikawajima-Harima J3, a compact axial-flow turbojet engine. However, development of this engine was not proceeding as quickly as hoped, thus the initial T-1A model was powered by the British Bristol Siddeley Orpheus turbojet engine instead. On 17 May 1960, the prototype T-1 conducted its maiden flight. In contrast to the T-1A, the T-1B was powered by the Ishikawajima-Harima J3 engine, 20 of which were produced between June 1962 and June 1963.

At one point, it was planned for in excess of 200 T-1s to be procured for the Japan Air Self Defense Force (JASDF). However, wider political trends impacted this ambition; increasingly close defence cooperation between the US and Japan, particularly after the enactment of the Treaty of Mutual Cooperation and Security led to American aircraft manufacturers being keen to issue production licences to Japan; one such arrangement led to the local production of Lockheed F-104J/DJ fighters for the JASDF. Thereafter, there was a substantial change in Japan's training requirements, which contributed to the American-designed Lockheed T-33A being procured in quantity to perform the bulk of Japan's trainer role. As a consequence, only 66 T-1s were ever produced.

There were some efforts to market the T-1 to international customers. One particular prospective customer identified for the type was the Royal Australian Air Force.

== Operational history ==
The aircraft were introduced in the early 1960s. In December 2000, shortly after the entry into service of its successor, the Kawasaki T-4, the JASDF ceased all use of the T-1 for flight training. The final T-1 was retired on 3 March 2006.

== Variants ==
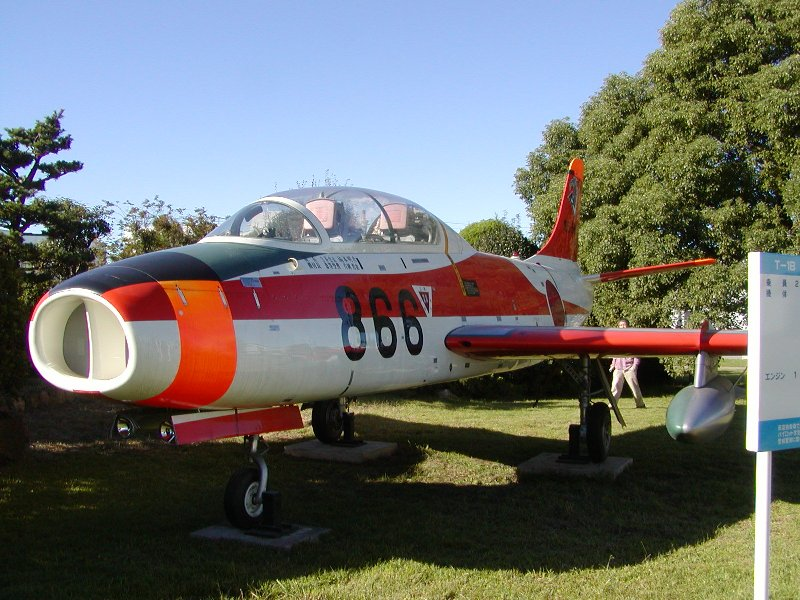
Fuji T-1 displayed at Komaki Air Base

Data from: Simpson 2001, p. 246

T1F1
One Prototype powered by a Nippon J3 engine.
T1F2
Two prototypes, powered by 11,800 N (2,645 lbf) Bristol BOr.1 Orpheus engines.
T1F3
Initial designation for the production T-1A, powered by 11,765.55 N (2,645 lbf) Bristol BOr.4 Orpheus engines.
T-1A
Powered by a 17.79 kN (4,000 lbf) Bristol Siddeley Orpheus Mk 805 turbojet engine. The original designation was T1F3. 46 built.
T-1B
Powered by an 11.77 kN (2,645 lbf) Ishikawajima-Harima J3-IHI-3 turbojet engine. 20 built.
T-1C
Converted to 13.72 kN (3,085 lbf) Ishikawajima-Harima J3-IHI-7 engines.

== Operators ==
Japan

- Japan Air Self Defense Force

== Aircraft on display ==
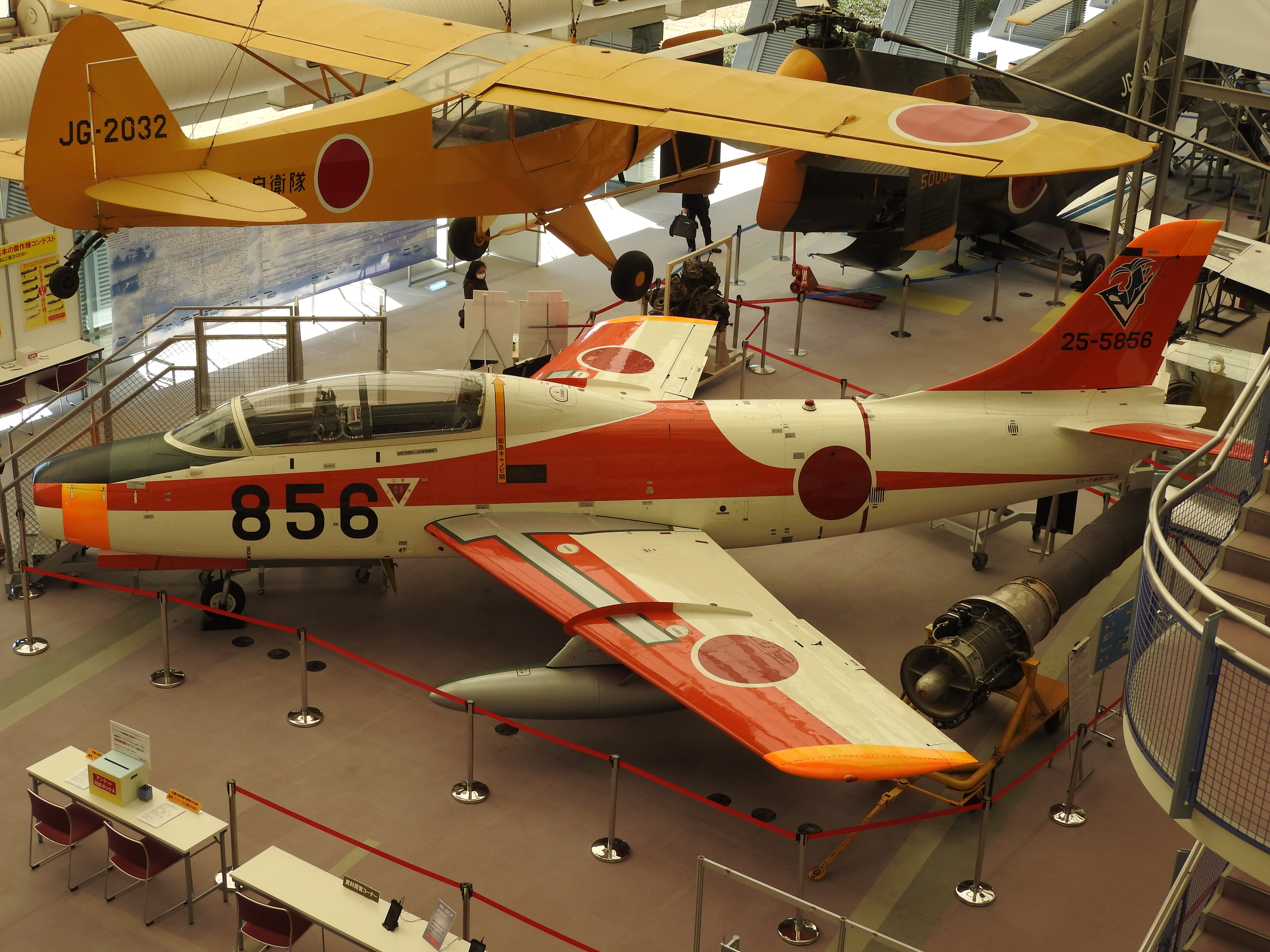
Fuji T-1 (25-5856) at Tokorozawa Aviation Museum

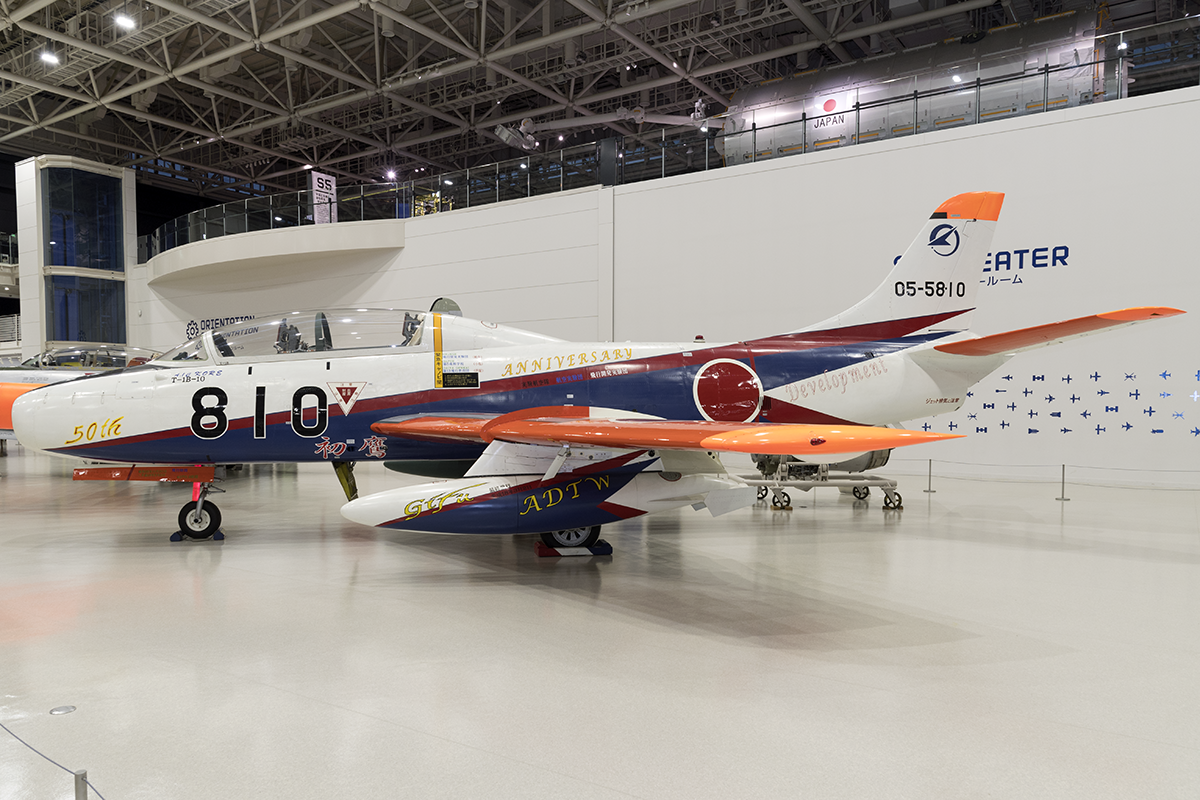
Fuji T-1B 05-5810 of AD&TW at Gifu-Kakamigahara Air and Space Museum.

- T-1B 25-5856 at Tokorozawa Aviation Museum, Saitama Prefecture
- T-1B 35-5870 at Saitama Subaru Sakitama Garden, Gyōda, Saitama Prefecture
- T-1B 05-5810 at Kakamigahara Air and Space Museum

== Specifications (T-1A) ==
Data from Jane's All The World's Aircraft 1965-66

General characteristics

- Crew: 2
- Length: 12.12 m (39 ft 9 in)
- Wingspan: 10.50 m (34 ft 5 in)
- Height: 4.08 m (13 ft 5 in)
- Wing area: 22.22 m^{2} (239.2 sq ft)
- Aspect ratio: 4.96:1
- Airfoil: K-561/K-569
- Empty weight: 2,420 kg (5,335 lb)
- Gross weight: 4,150 kg (9,149 lb) clean
- Max takeoff weight: 5,000 kg (11,023 lb) (with external tanks)
- Fuel capacity: 1,400 Litres (308 Imperial Gallons)
- Powerplant: 1 × Bristol Siddeley Orpheus Mk 805 turbojet, 18 kN (4,000 lbf) thrust

Performance

- Maximum speed: 925 km/h (575 mph, 499 kn) at 6,100 m (20,000 ft)
- Cruise speed: 620 km/h (390 mph, 330 kn) at 9,150 m (30,000 ft)
- Range: 1,300 km (810 mi, 700 nmi) (internal fuel)
- Ferry range: 1,950 km (1,210 mi, 1,050 nmi) (external tanks)
- Service ceiling: 14,400 m (47,200 ft)
- Rate of climb: 33 m/s (6,500 ft/min)
- Thrust/weight: 0.43

Armament

- Guns: Provision for 1 × 12.7 mm Browning M53-2 machine gun in nose
- Hardpoints: 2 , with provisions to carry combinations of:
  - Missiles: 2 × AIM-9 Sidewinder air-to-air missiles
  - Bombs: 2 × 750 lb (340 kg) bombs
  - Other: 2 × 455 L (100 Imp Gallon) drop tanks

== See also ==
Aircraft of comparable role, configuration, and era

- Aermacchi MB-326
- Fokker S.14 Machtrainer
- TF-86 Sabre
- Lockheed T-33
