= General Electric T64 =

Turboshaft engine

T64
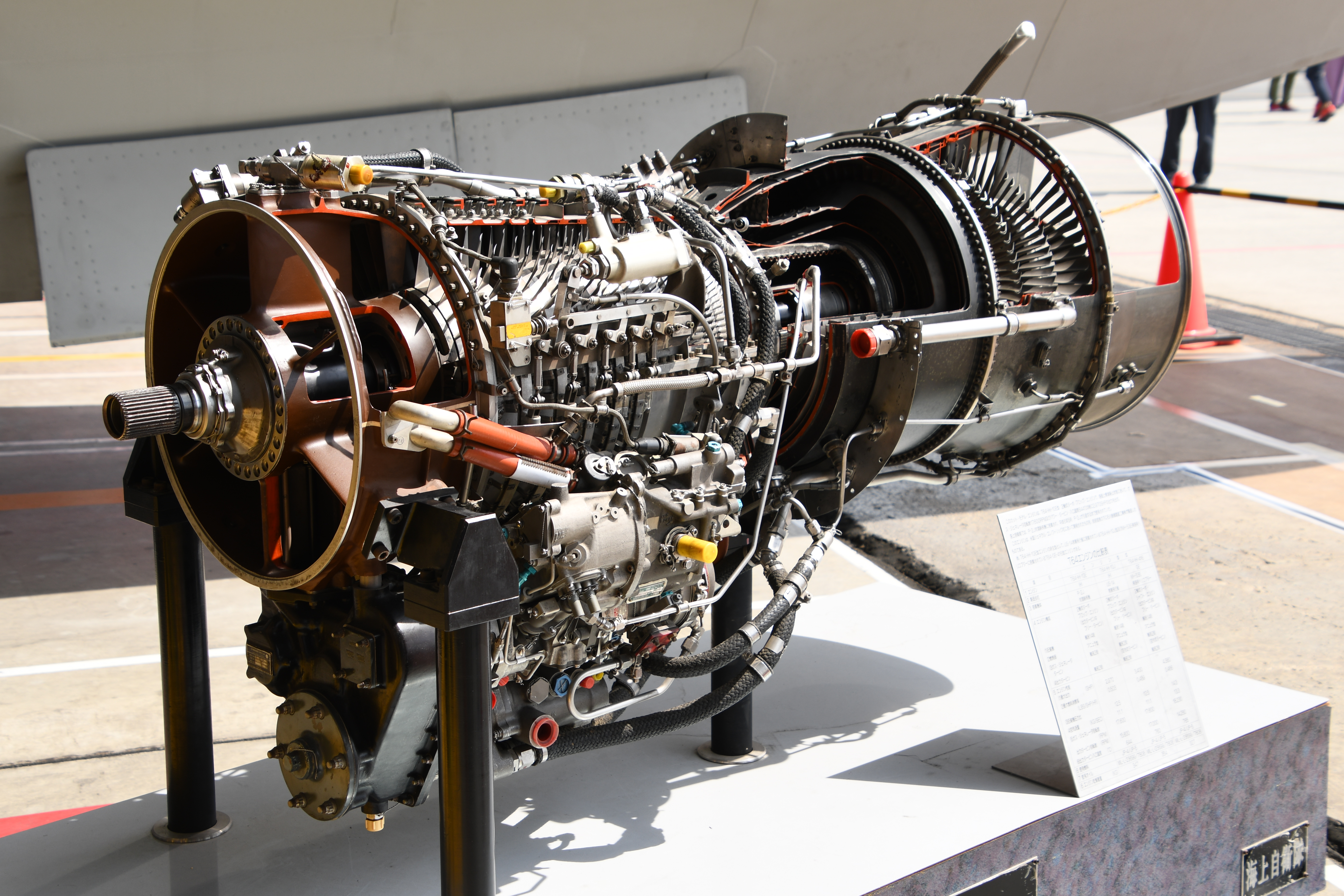
- Cutaway of a T64-IHI-10E (in turboprop configuration)
- Type: Turboshaft
- National origin: United States
- Manufacturer: GE Aviation
- First run: (T64-GE-2) March 1959
- Major applications: Lockheed AH-56 Cheyenne; Alenia G.222; de Havilland Canada DHC-5 Buffalo; Sikorsky CH-53 Sea Stallion; Sikorsky CH-53E Super Stallion

The General Electric T64 is a free-turbine turboshaft engine that was originally developed for use on helicopters, but which was later used on fixed-wing aircraft as well. General Electric introduced the engine in 1964. The original engine design included technical innovations such as corrosion resistant and high-temperature coatings. The engine features a high overall pressure ratio, yielding a low specific fuel consumption for its time. Although the compressor is all-axial, like the earlier General Electric T58, the power turbine shaft is coaxial with the HP shaft and delivers power to the front of the engine, not rearwards. Fourteen compressor stages are required to deliver the required overall pressure ratio. Compressor handling is facilitated by 4 rows of variable stators. Unlike the T58, the power turbine has 2 stages.

Later versions of the engine produce from 3,925 to 4,750 shp (2,927 to 3,542 kW).

The engine was designed to accommodate different gearboxes or shaft drives, for helicopter or turboprop fixed-wing applications. The engine could be operated continuously at angles between 100 degrees upward and 45 degrees downward for STOL or helicopter applications.

== Variants ==
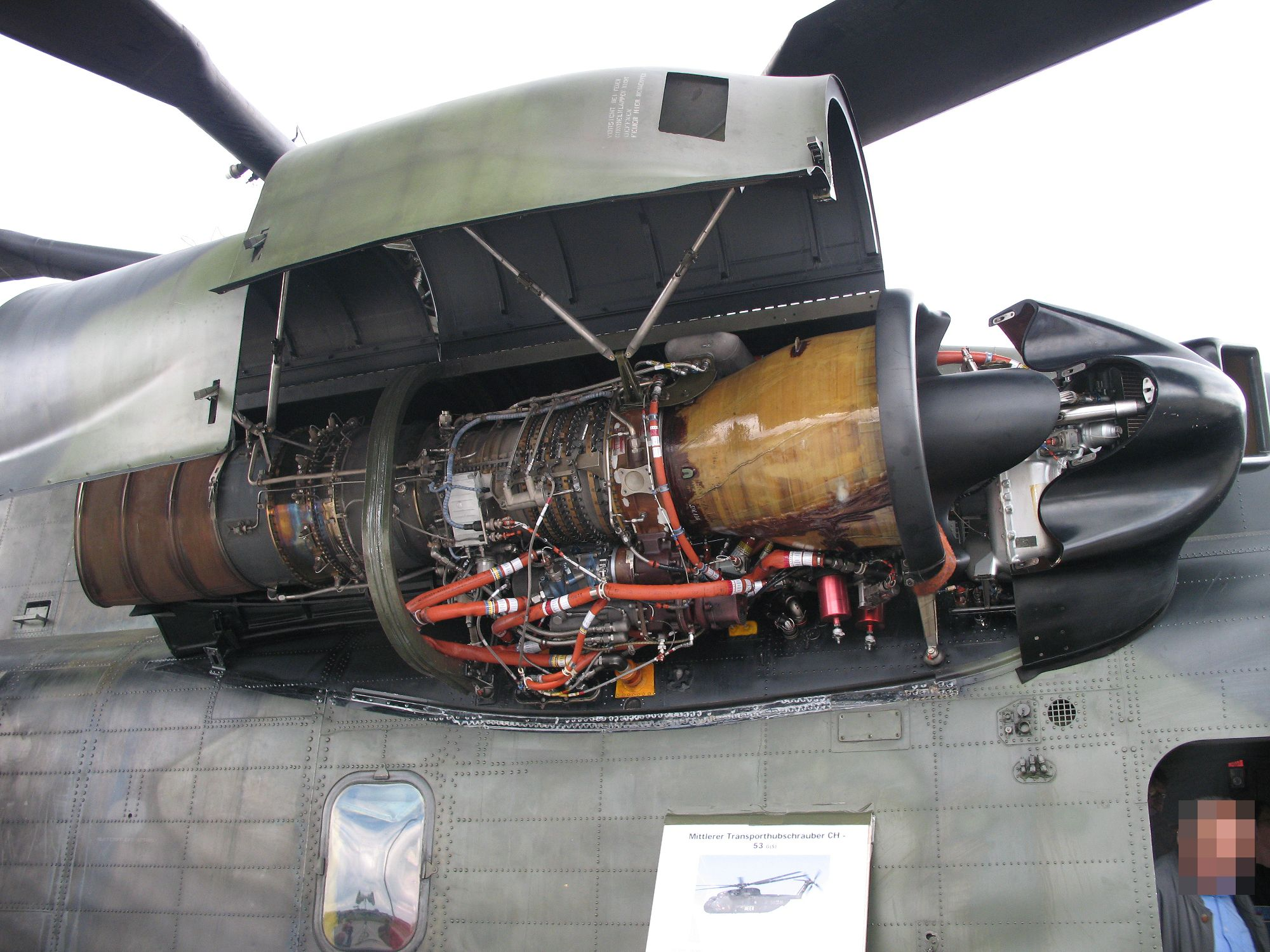
T64-GE-7 installed on Sikorsky CH-53G helicopter

Data from: Vectorsite; Sikorsky Giant Helicopters

T64-GE-1
3,080 hp (2,300 kW)
T64-GE-2
Turbo-shaft: 2,810 hp (2,100 kW) at 5,200 rpm output
T64-GE-3
T64-GE-4
Turbo-prop, reduction gearbox below centre-line, airscrew brake and bolt-on control unit: 2,850 hp (2,130 kW) at 1,160 propeller rpm.
YT64-GE-6
2,850 hp (2,130 kW) used for Hughes XV-9 hot-cycle hot cycle rotor drive research helicopter.
T64-GE-6
Turbo-shaft: 2,850 hp (2,130 kW) at 13,600 engine rpm.
T64-GE-7
3,925 hp (2,927 kW)
T64-GE-7A
3,936 hp (2,935 kW)
T64-GE-8
Turbo-prop, reduction gearbox above centerline, airscrew brake and bolt-on control unit: 2,850 hp (2,130 kW) at 1,160 propeller rpm.
T64-GE-10
2,970 hp (2,210 kW)
T64-GE-16
3,485 hp (2,599 kW)
T64-GE-100
4,330 hp (3,230 kW)
T64-GE-412
3,695 hp (2,755 kW)
T64-GE-413
3,925 hp (2,927 kW)
T64-GE-413A
3,936 hp (2,935 kW)
T64-GE-415
4,380 hp (3,270 kW)
T64-GE-416
4,380 hp (3,270 kW) - three on Sikorsky CH-53E Super Stallion
T64-GE-419
4,750 hp (3,540 kW) engine to power the MV-75 Cheyenne II tiltrotor aircraft
T64-GE-423
3,925 hp (2,927 kW)
T64-BS-12
T63-BS-16
T64-P4D
Turboprop 3,400 hp (2,500 kW)
CT64-820-1
2,850 hp (2,130 kW)
CT64-820-2
CT64-820-3
3,130 hp (2,330 kW)
CT64-820-4
3,133 hp (2,336 kW)
T64/P4D
3,400 hp (2,500 kW)
Ishikawajima-Harima T64-IHI-10
For Kawasaki P-2J and Shin Meiwa PS-X

== Applications ==
- Aeritalia G.222
- de Havilland Canada DHC-5 Buffalo
- Lockheed AH-56 Cheyenne
- Kawasaki P-2J
- LTV XC-142
- ShinMaywa US-1
- NAMC YS-11E
- Sikorsky CH-53 Sea Stallion
- Sikorsky CH-53E Super Stallion
- Sikorsky HH-53/MH-53
- Bell MV-75 Cheyenne II

== Specifications (T64-GE-100) ==
Data from Gas Turbine Engines

==== General characteristics ====
- Type: Turboshaft engine
- Length: 79 in (2,007 mm)
- Diameter: 20 in (508 mm)
- Dry weight: 720 lb (327 kg)

==== Components ====
- Compressor: Axial, 14 stage HP compressor
- Combustors: Annular
- Turbine: Axial, 2 stage HP turbine, 2 stage PT turbine
- Fuel type: Aviation kerosene
- Oil system: Pressure spray / splash

==== Performance ====
- Maximum power output: 4,330 hp (3,230 kW)
- Max Continuous Power: 3,810 shp (2,840 kW)
- Overall pressure ratio: 14.9:1
- Turbine inlet temperature: 1,180 °F (638 °C)(-1), 1,325 °F (718 °C)(-413), 1,410 °F (770 °C)(-415)
- Specific fuel consumption: 0.48 lb/(hp⋅h) (0.29 kg/kWh)
- Power-to-weight ratio: 6.014 hp/lb (9.887 kW/kg)

== See also ==
Comparable engines

- Allison T56
- Bristol Proteus
- Ivchenko AI-20
- Rolls-Royce Tyne

Related lists

- List of aircraft engines
