= Kawasaki P-2J =

Japanese maritime patrol aircraft

P-2J Neptune
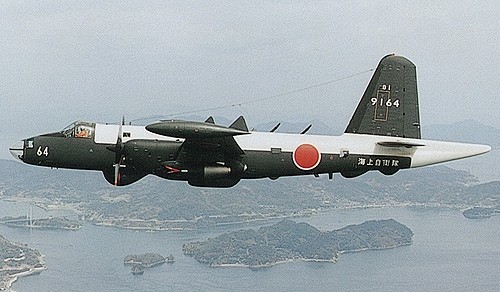
- A UP-2J

General information
- Type: ASW and maritime patrol aircraft
- National origin: Japan/United States
- Manufacturer: Lockheed; Kawasaki Aerospace Company
- Status: out of service and production
- Primary user: Japan Maritime Self-Defense Force
- Number built: 83

History
- Manufactured: 1966-1979
- Introduction date: 1969
- First flight: 21 July 1966
- Retired: 1996
- Developed from: Lockheed P-2 Neptune

The Kawasaki P-2J (originally P2V-Kai) is a maritime patrol and ASW aircraft developed for the Japan Maritime Self-Defense Force. A twin turboprop-powered version of the radial-engined P-2 Neptune, the P-2J was developed as an alternative to buying the larger and more expensive P-3 Orion, which would eventually replace the P-2J in the 1980s.

== Design and development ==
The Kawasaki-built P-2J (originally P2V-Kai, where "Kai" (改) means modification) was the last version of the Neptune to be produced. Work on the P-2J was begun in 1961. The first P-2J, converted from a P2V-7 (P-2H) performed its initial flight on 21 July 1966, and the last of a further 82 production P-2Js was delivered in March 1979.

The Wright radial engines of the Lockheed P-2s were replaced with 2,125 kW (2,850 HP) Ishikawajima-Harima T64-IHI-10 turboprop engines, using three-bladed propellers instead of the four-bladed units of late-model P-2s. The Ishikawajima-Harima J3-IHI-7C booster turbojets, produced 13.7 kN (3,085 lbf) thrust, giving the P-2J a top speed of 650 km/h (400 mph).

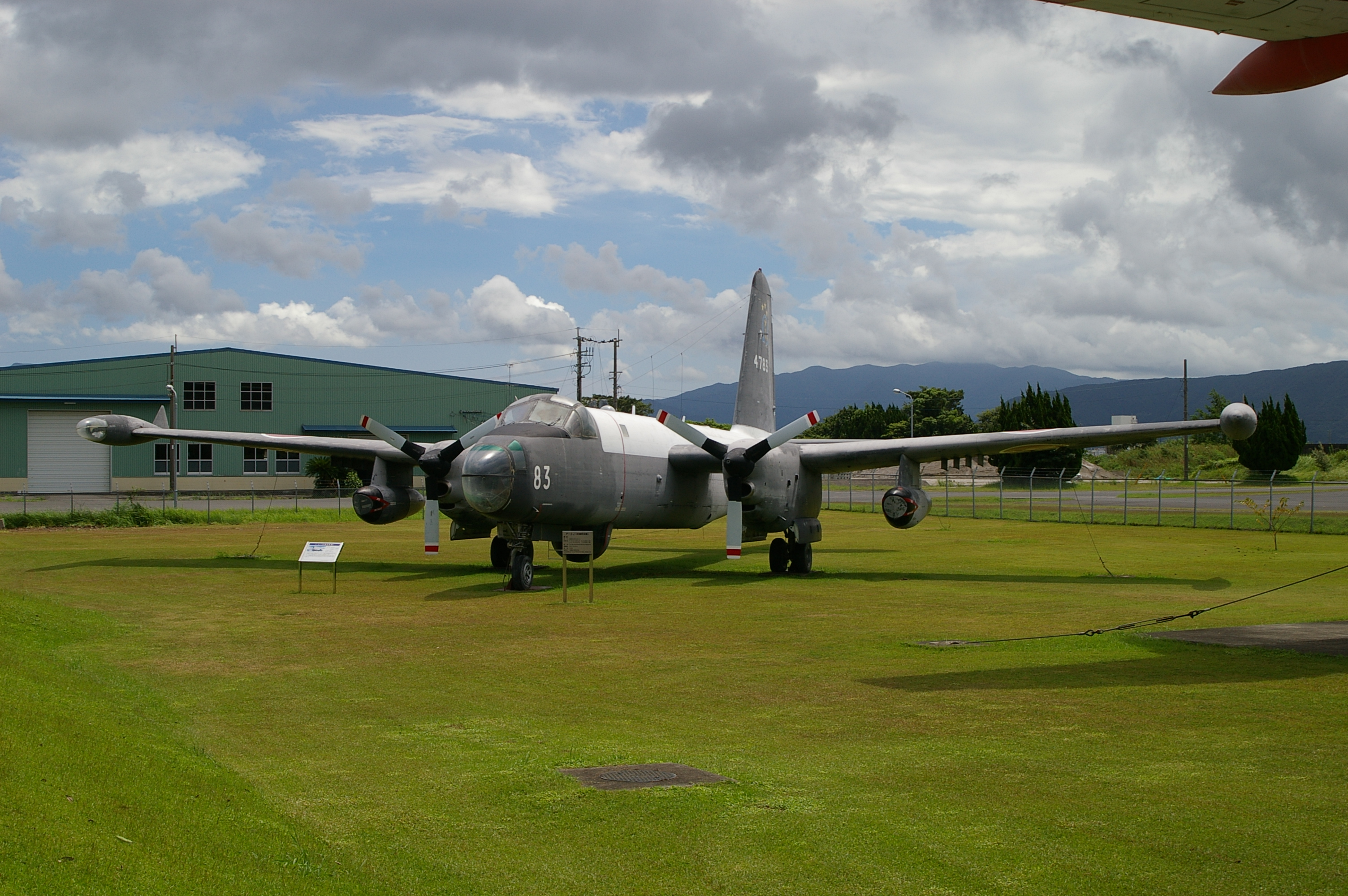
A P-2J (note the twin-wheel main gear) displayed at Kanoya Air Base

The P-2J had accommodations for up to 12 crewmen. The forward fuselage was extended 4 feet 3 inches (1.30 m), with the tail surfaces being enlarged and their shape modified. AN/APS-80 search radar was fitted in a smaller radome. Updated avionics systems were installed, and these systems were much more compact than those used in other versions of the Neptune. The lighter avionics load permitted greater fuel capacity. The P-2J's main gear was fitted with two wheels each, rather than the one large wheel of the earlier models.

== Operational history ==
The P-2J was phased out in the 1980s in favor of the P-3C Orion, which eventually replaced the Neptune in the ocean-patrol air fleets of the West. The last maritime reconnaissance squadron re-equipped with the Orion in 1993, but the P-2J remained in service for electronic reconnaissance and target support purposes.

== Variants ==
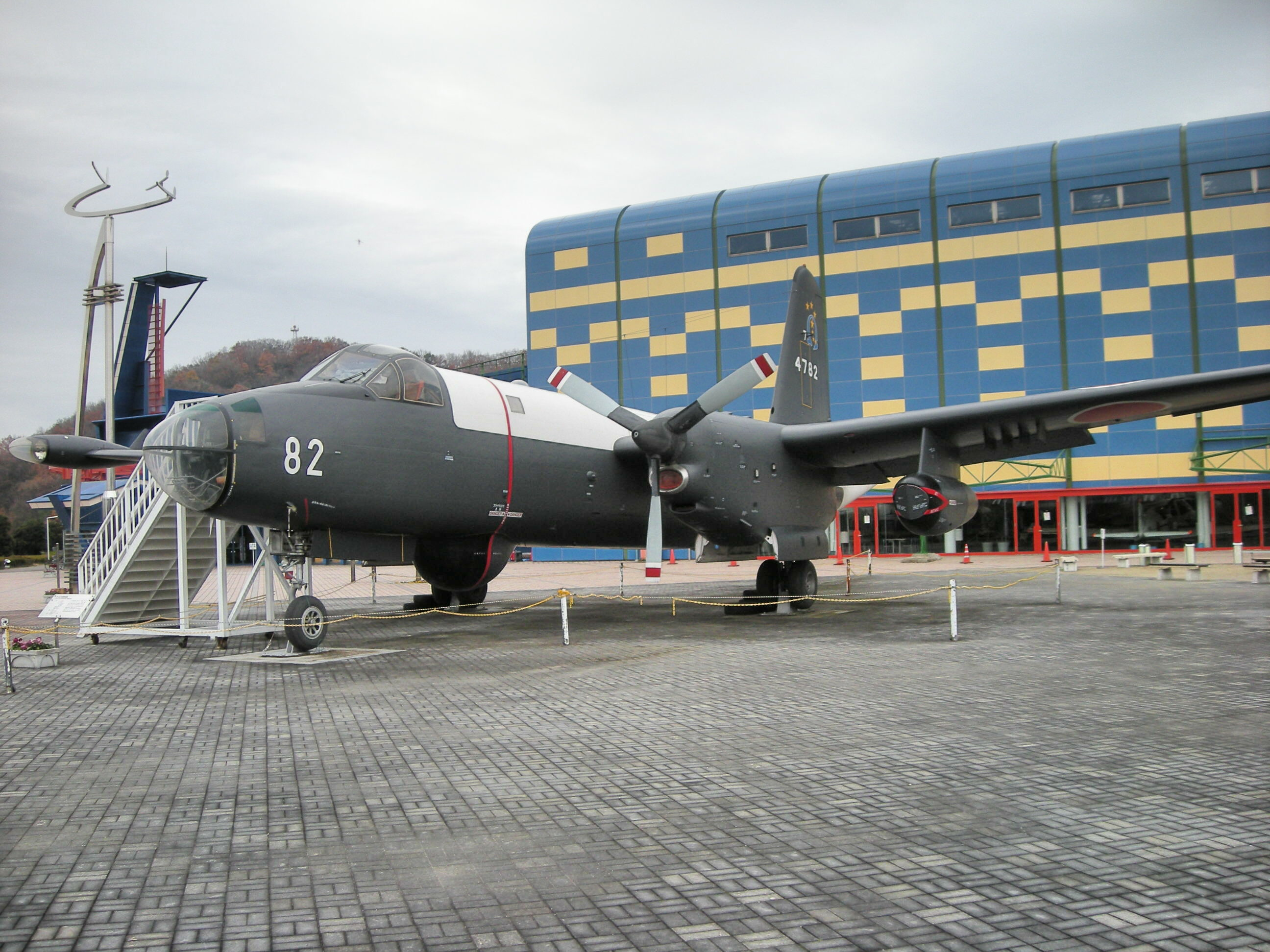
A P-2J at the Kakamigahara Aerospace Science Museum

P-2J
Originally called the P2V-Kai
T64 turboprop engines, IHI J3 engine pods, improved ASW/ECM gear, APS-80 search radar standard, increased fuel capacity, various other improvements; 1 converted from a P-2H, and 82 new-builds.
EP-2J
P-2J converted for electronic intelligence gathering. Two converted.
UP-2J
P-2J converted for drone support, target towing and test purposes. Four converted.

== Operators ==
Japan

- Japan Maritime Self-Defense Force

== Specifications (P-2J) ==
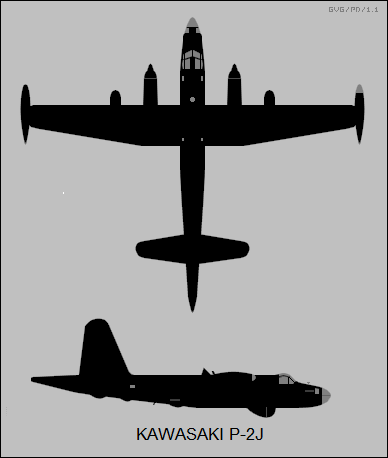
Lockheed P2V-Kai(P-2J) Neptune

Data from Combat Aircraft since 1945

General characteristics

- Crew: 10-12
- Length: 29.23 m (95 ft 11 in)
- Wingspan: 30.87 m (101 ft 3 in)
- Height: 8.93 m (29 ft 4 in)
- Wing area: 92.9 m^{2} (1,000 sq ft)
- Airfoil: root: NACA 2419 mod.; tip: NACA 4410.5
- Empty weight: 19,278 kg (42,500 lb)
- Max takeoff weight: 34,020 kg (75,000 lb)
- Powerplant: 2 × Ishikawajima-Harima T64-IHI-10 turboprop engines, 2,125 kW (2,850 hp) each
- Powerplant: 2 × Ishikawajima-Harima J3-IHI-7C turbojet engines, 13.7 kN (3,100 lbf) thrust each (boosters for take-off and combat)
- Propellers: 3-bladed constant-speed fully-feathering reversible-pitch propellers

Performance

- Cruise speed: 402 km/h (250 mph, 217 kn)
- Ferry range: 4,445 km (2,762 mi, 2,400 nmi)
- Service ceiling: 9,100 m (30,000 ft)
- Rate of climb: 9.1 m/s (1,800 ft/min)

Armament

- Rockets: 16 x 5 in rockets under the wings
- Bombs: 3,629 kg (8,000 lb) including free-fall bombs, depth charges, and torpedoes

== See also ==
Related development

- Lockheed P-2 Neptune

Aircraft of comparable role, configuration, and era

- Avro Shackleton
- Breguet Atlantique
- Lockheed P-3 Orion

Related lists

- List of Lockheed aircraft
- List of military aircraft of the United States
