= Austin 250hp gas turbine =

Uncommercialised engine

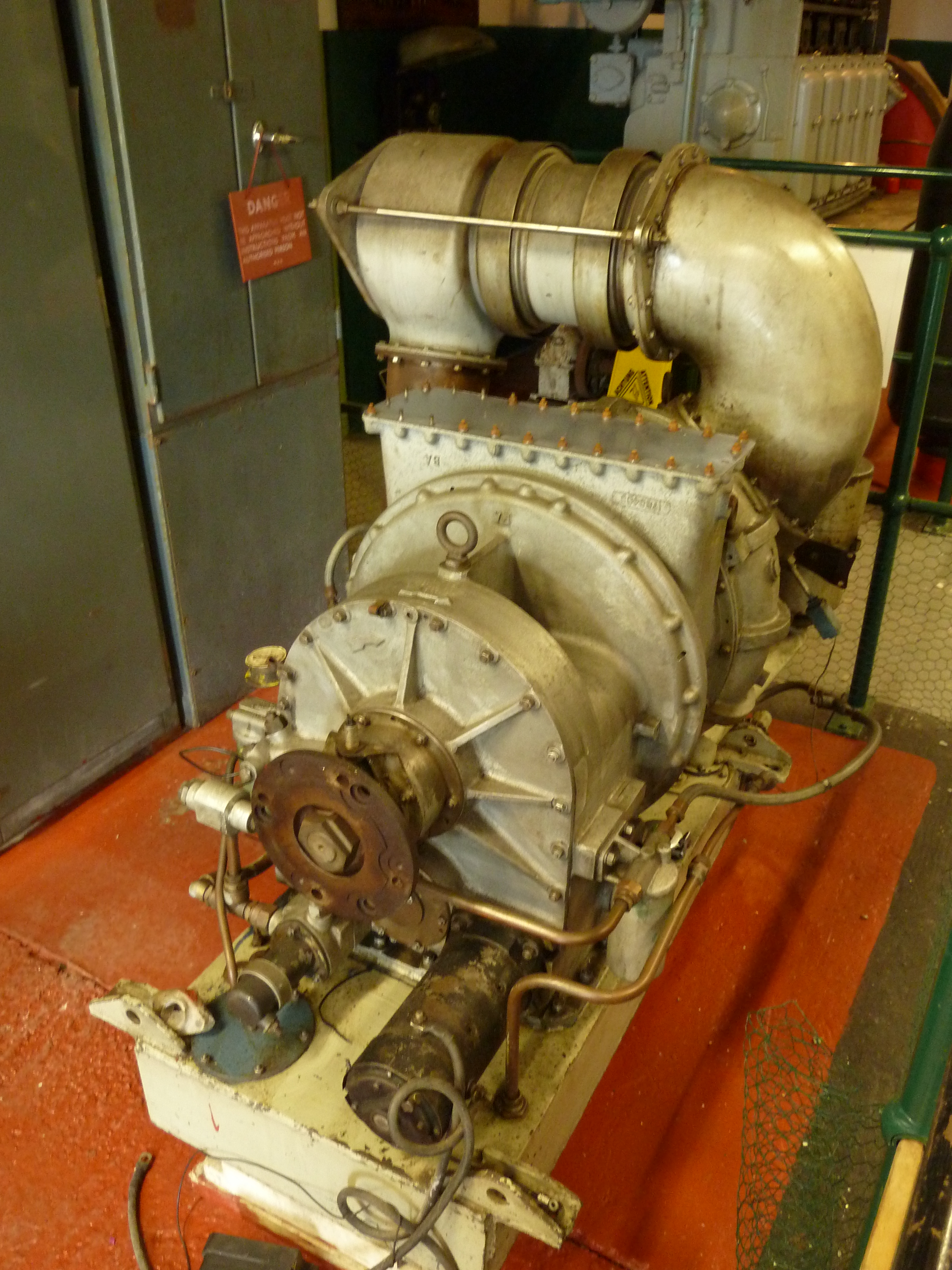
Austin Gas Turbine at Internal Fire museum

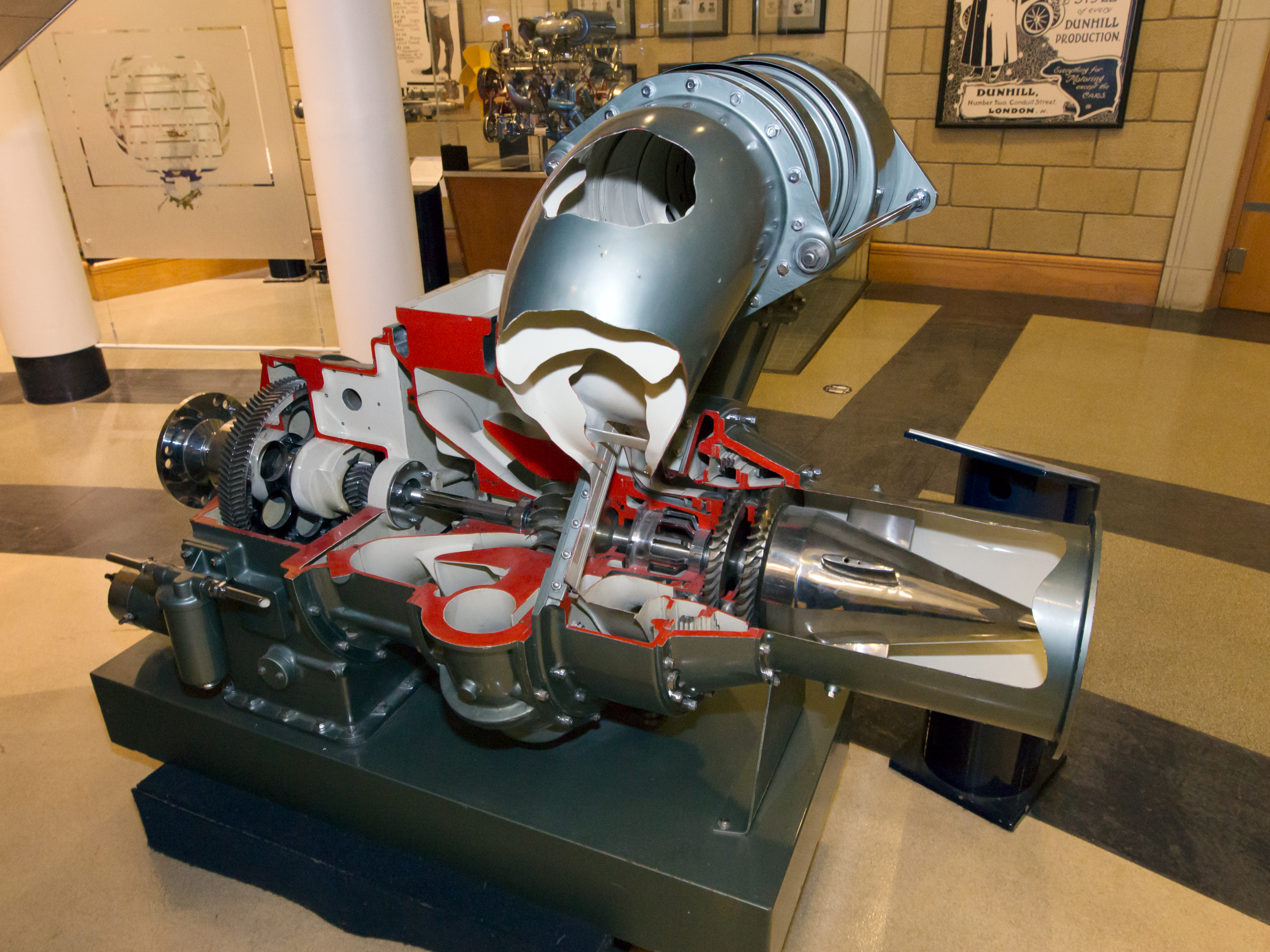
Austin gas turbine engine (250 horsepower) at Gaydon

The Austin 250 hp gas turbine was a free-turbine turboshaft engine developed by Dr John Weaving at the Austin Motor Company. It was a development of an earlier engine that had been used in the experimental Austin Princess car TUR1. Various uses for the engine were suggested, such as mobile power unit and hospital backup generator, but it did not find any commercial use. More powerful derivates were developed but these also found no uses.
