= Messerschmitt Bf 109 operational history =

The Messerschmitt Bf 109 is a German World War II fighter aircraft designed by Willy Messerschmitt and Robert Lusser during the early to mid-1930s. It was one of the first true modern fighters of the era, including such features as all-metal monocoque construction, a closed canopy, a retractable landing gear, and was powered by a liquid-cooled, inverted-V12 aero engine.

The Bf 109 saw active service in many air forces and was active in several conflicts outside of World War II.

== Combat service in the Spanish Civil War ==
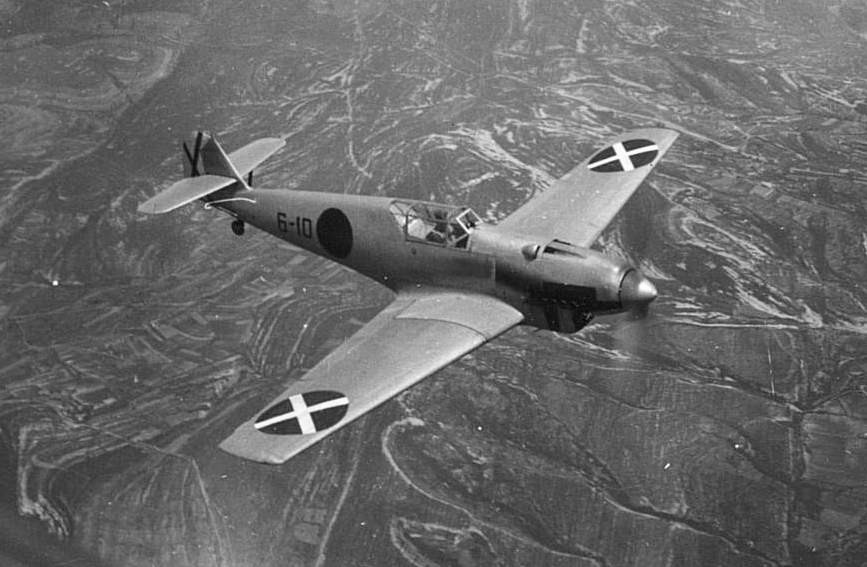
Bf 109A from the Condor Legion with Spanish rebel markings

Dozens of Messerschmitt Bf 109 fighters, including the A, B, C, D, and E variants, first saw active service in the Condor Legion against Soviet-supplied aircraft in mid 1937 as a testing ground for the new German fixed-wing fighter plane. The Bf 109 quickly replaced the Heinkel He 51 biplane fighter which suffered many losses during the first 12 months of the conflict. Of the Luftwaffe's Jagdgruppen, 136 Bf 109s were sent to Spain, and 47 of these, including Bf 109Bs, Ds and Es remained behind in service with the Spanish Air Force after the conclusion of the war in 1939. The Republican fighters were no match for the Bf 109, equipped mostly with Soviet built Polikarpov I-15 and Polikarpov I-16s the Republican forces suffered heavy losses to Nationalist and Condor Legion fighters. As many as 20 Bf 109s were lost in Spain to enemy action to both aerial combat and ground fire.

== Combat service with the Luftwaffe ==
The Bf 109 was credited with more aerial kills than any other aircraft. One hundred and five Bf 109 pilots were credited with the destruction of 100 or more enemy aircraft. Thirteen of these men scored more than 200 kills, while two scored more than 300. Altogether this group were credited with nearly 15,000 kills between them.

Among many of the combatants, ace status was granted to a pilot who scored five or more kills. Applying this to Luftwaffe fighter pilots and their records shows more than 2,500 German pilots were aces. However, the Germans did not use this benchmark; instead they awarded the title of Experte to a fighter pilot who not only demonstrated high skill in combat but also exemplified the best in personal character. The majority of Bf 109 pilots scored their kills against the Soviets; however, five pilots did record over 100 claims against the Western Allies. Luftwaffe records show that during Operation Barbarossa, German pilots claimed 7,355 kills on the Bf 109, among the seven Jagdgeschwader (JG 3, JG 27, JG 51, JG 53, JG 54, JG 77, and LG 2) for exactly 350 losses in aerial combat, a ratio of just over 21:1, and the highest achieved by the Germans on the Eastern Front. (Note: A breakdown of each unit is given, these also include losses on the ground, amounting to 32 Bf 109s.)During the latter part of the war, the Bf 109 was the selected aircraft that was used in the Rammkommando ELBE because of its lighter weight compared to the Fw 190.

Between January and October 1942, a further 18 German pilots joined the select group that had now reached 100 kills over the Eastern Front. During this period Bf 109 pilots claimed 12,000 Soviet aircraft destroyed.

=== The Bf 109 in the Battle of Britain ===
Arguably, the most well known of all Bf 109 operations was the contest of air superiority between the Royal Air Force and the Luftwaffe during the Battle of Britain in the summer of 1940. The E-1 and E-4 variants bore the brunt of the battle. On 31 August 1940, fighter units (excluding JG 77) reported 375 E-1s, 125 E-3s, 339 E-4s and 32 E-7s on strength, indicating that most of the E-3s had been already converted to E-4 standard. By July, one Gruppe (Wing) of JG 26 was equipped with the Bf 109 E-4/N model of improved performance, powered by the new DB 601N engine using 100 octane aviation fuel.

The fuel-injected DB 601 proved most useful against the British Supermarine Spitfire and Hawker Hurricane, as the British fighters used gravity-fed carburetted engines, which would cut out under negative g-forces whereas the DB 601 did not. The Bf 109s thus had the initial advantage in dives, either during attack or to escape, in that it could 'bunt' directly into a dive with no loss of power. Another difference was the choice of fighter armament: the RAF's Hurricanes and Spitfires in the main used eight 0.303 in (7.7 mm) machine guns. Most Bf 109E variants (E-3, E-4, E-7) carried two 7.92 mm (.312 in) MG 17s and two 20 mm MG FF cannon. The latter fired mixed types of ammunition, including Minengeschoß type high-capacity explosive shells which were highly destructive, but had different ballistic properties to the MG 17s. The MG FFs had a relatively small ammunition supply compared to the machine guns, each being fed by a 60-round capacity drum magazine. Making up about one-third of the Bf 109Es in the Battle, the E-1s, carried an all-machine gun armament of four 7.92 mm (.312 in) MG 17 machine guns, but were provided with a total of 4,000 rounds.

British pilots who tested a captured Bf 109 E-3 liked the engine and throttle response, the docile and responsive handling and stall characteristics at low speeds, but criticised the high-speed handling characteristics (in part due to the automatic wing slats opening), poorer turning circle (850 ft as opposed to 680 ft for the Spitfire), and greater control forces required at speed (in part because of rudder pedal position and a lack of trim tabs).

In August 1940, comparative trials were held at the Erprobungsstelle Rechlin central Luftwaffe air test facility, with the leading Luftwaffe ace Werner Mölders being one of the participants. The tests concluded that the Bf 109 had superior level and climb speed to the Spitfire and Hurricane at all altitudes, but also noted the significantly smaller turning circle of the British fighters (more than one British pilots combat reports bear this out, having used the tighter turning circle of their aircraft to get into firing position, or conversely used it to get out of the way of a 109). It was advised not to engage in turning dogfights unless the performance advantage of the Bf 109 could be used to full effect. The roll rate of the Bf 109 was deemed superior, as was its stability on target approach. Mölders himself called the Spitfire "miserable as a fighting aircraft", due to its two-pitch propeller and the inability of its carburettor to handle negative g-forces. His complaint regarding the propeller was that with one setting selected the pilot was at risk of over-revving and stressing the engine, but conversely, selecting the other setting meant the aircraft could not run at its best (a situation roughly analogous to a car having too much of a gap between transmission ratios). In the political climate of the times, there was often a considerable amount of propaganda written into such reports by both sides or the information quickly become outdated; for example, as a result of a crash programme, all Spitfires and Hurricanes were retrofitted with either Rotol or Hamilton Standard constant-speed propellers by 16 August 1940.

During the Battle of Britain, the Bf 109's chief disadvantage was its short range: like most of the 1930s monoplane interceptors, it was designed to engage enemy bombers over friendly territory, and the range and endurance necessary for escorting long-ranged bombers over enemy territory was not required. The Bf 109E escorts used during the Battle had a limited fuel capacity resulting in only a 660 km (410 mile) maximum range solely on internal fuel, and when they arrived over a British target, had only 10 minutes of flying time before turning for home, leaving the bombers undefended by fighter escorts. Its eventual stablemate, the Focke-Wulf Fw 190A, was only flying in prototype form in the summer of 1940; the first 28 Fw 190s were not delivered until November 1940. The Fw 190A-1 had a maximum range of 940 km (584 miles) on internal fuel, 40% greater than the Bf 109E. The Messerschmitt Bf 109E-7 corrected this deficiency by adding a ventral center-line ordnance rack to take either an SC 250 bomb or a standard 300 litre Luftwaffe drop tank to double the range to 1,325 km (820 mi). The ordnance rack was not retrofitted to earlier Bf 109Es until October 1940. The Spitfire and Hurricane, designed with similar operational requirements in mind, had a tactical advantage as they were operating virtually over their home airfields as interceptors, and thus being able to remain longer in the combat area.

== Combat service with Italy ==
Regia Aeronautica (1942–1943)

From November 1942 to April 1943, the Regia Aeronautica received only 160 new bombers and 758 new fighters from their own production lines, while losing about 1,600 aircraft in combat, for accidents and other causes. For this reason, the Italian Air Force decided to use German aircraft. General Kesselring accepted a first batch of about 30 Bf 109s that were assigned to 150° and 3° Gruppo. The first unit under command of Maggiore Antonio Vizzotto was ready to operate in April moving to Caltagirone airfield, then on Sciacca's, in Sicily. Just before the Allies landed in Sicily, the 150° Gruppo (363ª, 364ª, 365ª Squadriglia) had 25 Bf 109s operative, while 17 other Bf 109s were with 3° Gruppo (153ª, 154ª, 155ª Squadriglia) on Comiso airfield, in Sicily. Most of them were destroyed by Allied bombers. On 12 July, the fourth day of combat, the two Gruppos had lost nearly all the aircraft. By mid-July, the 150° Gruppo was deployed to Ciampino airfield, just outside Rome with the last three remaining Bf 109s arriving from Sicily. Meanwhile, 23° Gruppo (70ª, 74ª, 75ª Squadriglia) of 3° Stormo, on Cerveteri airfield, in Latium, received 11 Bf 109Gs. By 8 September, when Italy signed the Armistice of Cassibile, only four Bf 109s remained serviceable, based on Ciampino airstrip, with 150 Gruppo.

ANR (1943–1945)

The Aeronautica Nazionale Repubblicana (ANR) was the airforce deployed by the Repubblica Sociale Italiana (RSI). Although the ANR was organised by the RSI, much of its operational control came from the Luftwaffe. At first, the ANR fighter units (I° Gruppo Caccia and II° Gruppo Caccia (Note: I° Gruppo was formed towards the end of 1943; II° Gruppo in March 1944.)) used Macchi C.205s and Fiat G.55 Centauros respectively. Notwithstanding the G.55s gave a good account of themselves against Allied fighters like the Spitfire and Mustang the Luftwaffe's Jagdfliegerführer (Fighter Controller or Jafü), considering that many of the unit's pilots had experience flying the Bf 109Gs of the Regia Aeronautica over Sicily, directed that the Fiat G.55s of II° Gruppo Caccia would be replaced by Bf 109Gs. Ex-JG 4 Bf 109 G-6 aircraft started arriving at Cascina Vaga on 29 May, and two G-12 trainers were delivered two weeks later. By 22 June, the unit was ready for its first operations.

The unit's first operation with the Bf 109 occurred on 22 June 1944; eleven Bf 109s sortied from the airfield, although nothing was achieved.

I°Gr.C continued to use a combination of Macchi 205s and Fiat G.55s; although, for various reasons, (Note: On 25 August 1944, the Germans announced that the ANR was to be disbanded (Operation Phoenix).) the unit rarely operated from August 1944 through to December, when the first Bf 109 G-12 trainer arrived. Still in December, the remaining 17 pilots of I° Gruppo were moved to Rangsdorf, in Berlin, to start a training course on Me 163 rocket fighter.

In November 1944, I°Gr.C was transferred to the Luftwaffe flying school at Holzkirchen in Germany to convert to the Messerschmitts. At the beginning of February, 57 of I° Gruppo's pilots were ready for operations with the Bf 109; 51 (52, according to other sources) G-6s, G-10s and K-4s, most of which came directly from Germany, were available at the end of the month. The fighters were placed on the heath between Lonate Pozzolo and Malpensa airfields, and carefully camouflaged to protect them from Allied air raids. The first combat operation occurred on 14 March 1945. I° Gruppo attempted to intercept B-25 Mitchells of the 321st Bomb Group near Lake Garda, but in turn, were bounced by P-47 Thunderbolts of the 350th Fighter Group. 1° Gruppo had three pilots dead, one wounded, three aircraft lost and six damaged; in return, one P-47 was claimed by the Commander Adriano Visconti.

The other ANR fighter unit, II° Gruppo, that had given at the end of May 1944 its G.55s to I° Gruppo, had been re-equipped with 46 ex I./JG 53 and II./JG 77 Bf 109 G-6. On 22 June 1944, it took off on its first operational flight with its Messerschmitts and three days later it shot down two P-47s from the Gaullist French G.C.II/3. At this stage, Luftwaffe ordered ANR pilots to operate outside Italian borders. For instance, on 25 July, 18 Bf 109Gs from II° Gruppo were ordered to move to Tulln, in Austria, where they were subordinated to JG 53. They operated together with German pilots against an Allied bomber raid. During this combined mission, eight B-24 Liberators were shot down.

On 2 April 1945, II° Gruppo 29 Bf 109s, from Aviano and Osoppo bases, intercepted a large formation of B-25s over Ghedi, Brescia, escorted by P-47Ds of 347 Fighter Squadron. In the air battle that ensued, ANR pilots suffered a heavy defeat: 14 Bf 109s were shot down and six Italian pilots killed, without scoring a single air victory. On 10 April, three Bf 109s, flown by Sottotenente (Flying Officer) Umberto Gallori, Maresciallo (Warrant Officer) Mario Veronesi and Maresciallo Dino Forlani, intercepted P-47s from 57° Fighter Squadron over Milan and Como. Forlani claimed a P-47 damaged, but the other two Italian fighters were hit and lightly damaged. On 19 April, 1° Gruppo "Asso di bastoni" had its last combat, last claim and its last loss.

== Combat service with Hungary ==
In October 1942, the Luftwaffe agreed to partially re-arm Royal Hungarian Air Force (MKHL) fighter units with the Bf 109. Subordinated to the German Jagdgeschwader 52 on the Eastern Front, the first Hungarian fighter unit to convert to the Bf 109 F-4 was the RHAF's 1./1. vadászszázad (fighter squadron). After brief training on the type, zászlós (ensign) Lukács Ottó flew the first combat sorties on 15 October 1942. The unit was mainly engaged in fighter-bomber and strafing attacks until 16 December 1942, when főhadnagy (Lieutenant) György Bánlaky and hadnagy (Second Lieutenant) Imre Pánczél shot down four Ilyushin Il-2s; the first victims of the RHAF's 109s. Several other fighter units converted to the 109F and later G models during the course of 1943 and were heavily engaged in combat on the Eastern Front.

By late 1943, the RHAF realized the locally produced but obsolete MÁVAG Héja fighters were not up to the task, and began to equip fighter squadrons in the Home Air Defense with Bf 109s. During April and May 1944, the new Bf 109Gs were concentrated into the 101. Honi Légvédelmi Vadászrepülő Osztály (101st Home Air Defence Fighter Wing). The Hungarian Messerschmitt factory at Győr produced many of these under licence. The unit, commanded by the experienced Eastern Front veteran őrnagy (major) Heppes Aladár, was also known as the Red Pumas after its insignia. During 'The American Season', between May and August 1944, the 101. had claimed 15 P-51s, 33 P-38s and 56 four-engine bombers. But Hungarian losses were high too: 18 fighter pilots lost their lives.

The heaviest losses occurred on 7 August 1944, when 18 Bf 109s from 101 Fighter Group, escorting Luftwaffe Bf 109 G-6s, armed with additional cannons in underwing gondolas, took off to intercept 357 four-engined American bombers, escorted by 117 fighters. The Messerschmitts were intercepted by the escorting P-51 Mustangs that shot down eight Hungarians and at least nine Germans Bf 109s, losing just two of their number. Among the killed "Pumas" was Lt László Molnár Lukács, the top scoring Hungarian pilot to date, with 25 kills (including seven American aircraft).

By November 1944, the 101. was re-organized into a fighter regiment, and was re-equipped with the latest Messerschmitt Bf 109 G-10 and G-14 types. At the end of December, the pilots received new Bf 109s at Wiener-Neustadt and were subsequently transferred to the Kenyeri airfield. Early in February, the 101 Fighter Wing received 26 brand new Bf 109 G-10/U4s with the instructions that their engines had to be changed after 30–40 operating hours. However, combat missions against the USAAF's 15th Air Force came to an end, and the 101st's main adversary in the air became the Red Air Force. The Hungarian pilots were numerically far inferior to the Soviets but they nevertheless attacked. On 9 March, eight Bf 109Gs from 101/3 fighter squadron intercepted a formation of 25 Soviet Douglas Boston bombers escorted by 16 Yak-9s and shot down three. Two weeks later, eight of the "Red Pumas" attacked 26 Soviet aircraft south of Lake Balaton and shot down five without a single loss.

At the end of March 1945, the MKHL had to leave Hungary. The "Red Pumas" moved first to Petersdorf, then to Wiener-Neustadt and Tulln, then to Raffelding, Austria. From there, the Hungarian fighters still carried out many reconnaissance flights and attacks on ground targets. Their losses were dramatically high: in two days, the "Red Pumas" lost ten fighters and four pilots. On 17 April 1945, Sen. Lt. Kiss achieved the last MKHL aerial victory by shooting down a Soviet Yakovlev Yak-9. The unit set its last remaining Bf 109s on fire on 4 May 1945 at Raffelding airbase to prevent them from falling into the hands of advancing U.S. troops. One example of a Hungarian Bf 109, a G-10/U4 with Werknummer 611 943, survives to this day at the Planes of Fame Museum.

== Combat service with Finland ==
The Finnish Air Force received its first Bf 109s in 1943. A total of 162 aircraft of this type were to be purchased and the first aircraft landed in Finland on 13 March 1943. In total, 159 aircraft were taken into service, as two G-6s and one G-8 were destroyed en route to Finland. Forty-eight of these were G-2s, 109 were G-6s and two were G-8s. The Bf 109 is still the aircraft type that has served in the largest numbers in the Finnish Air Force. The aircraft was nicknamed Mersu in popular speech (the same as the nickname for Mercedes-Benz cars, whose parent company Daimler-Benz produced the Bf 109 engine) and carried the designation MT and a 3-digit identification number. With the arrival of the 109s, the Finns once again could fight on a more even basis, as they could match the latest Soviet fighters. The last of the purchased aircraft arrived in Finland on 20 August 1944, just before the armistice with the Soviet Union.

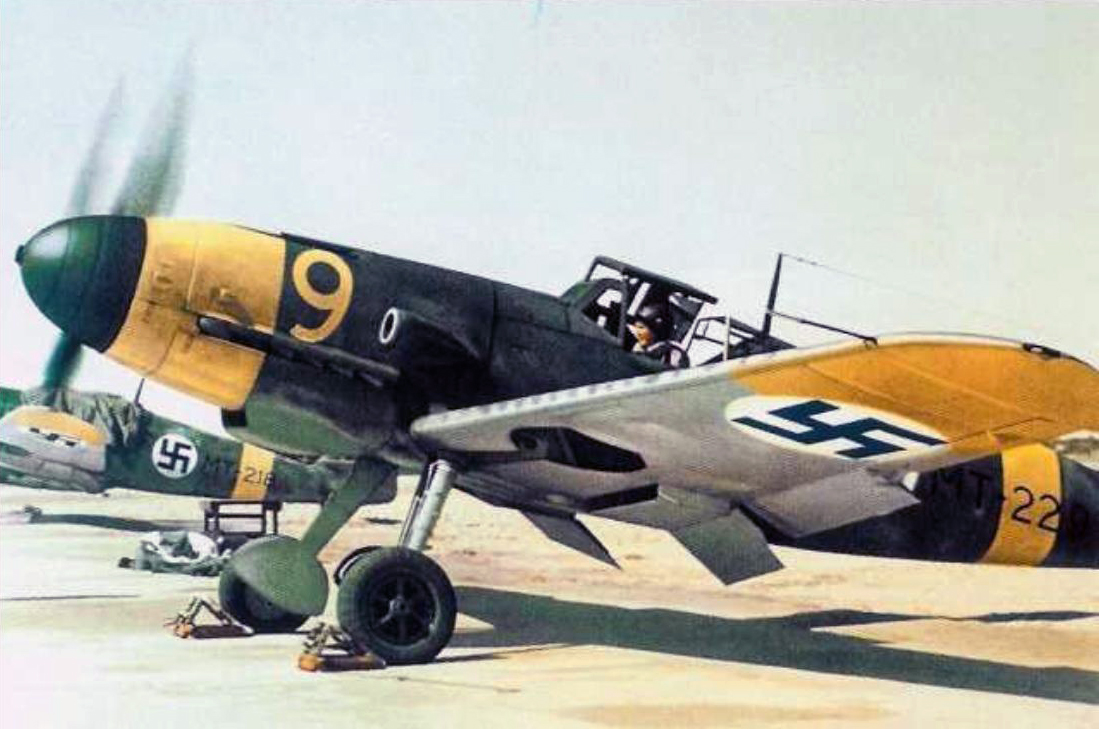
Finnish Bf 109G-2 at Malmi Airport in 1943

During the Continuation War, Bf 109s were in service with fighter squadrons 24, 28, 30 and 34:

Finnish Bf 109G tally:
	HLeLv 24	HLeLv 28	HLeLv 30	HLeLv 34
Victories	304	15	3	345
Losses in combat	14	0	2	18

The Finns scored 667 confirmed victories with the type, losing 34 Bf 109s to enemy fighters or anti-aircraft fire. A further 16 were lost in accidents and eight aircraft were destroyed on the ground. Twenty-three pilots were killed.

One hundred and two Bf 109s survived the war, and the aircraft remained the main fighter of the Finnish Air Force for almost a decade after the end of World War II. Despite the aircraft's expected short lifespan (it was built as a wartime aircraft and was calculated to last about 100–200 flight hours), it continued in service until spring 1954 when the FAF entered the Jet Age. The last flight was on 13 March 1954 by Major Erkki Heinilä in aircraft MT-507.

Museum aircraft in Finland

Several Bf 109s are preserved in Finland. MT-452 is on display at the airfield in Utti, and the Central Finland Aviation Museum displays MT-507, which was the last flying Bf 109 of the FAF. The Finnish airplane constructor Valtion Lentokonetehdas also manufactured a fighter, called VL Pyörremyrsky, whose appearance greatly resembled the Bf 109 but which also features some significant improvements, such as significantly easier handling, different wing construction, and re-designed landing gear. One single aircraft was produced before the end of the war; it is today displayed at the Central Finland Aviation Museum. Further, the doctoral thesis by the Finnish aircraft expert Hannu Valtonen is called "Tavallisesta kuriositeetiksi – Kahden Keski-Suomen Ilmailumuseon Messerschmitt Bf 109 -lentokoneen museoarvo" (From regular to a curiosity – The museal value of two Messerschmitt Bf 109s at the Central Finland Aviation Museum).

== Combat service with Switzerland ==
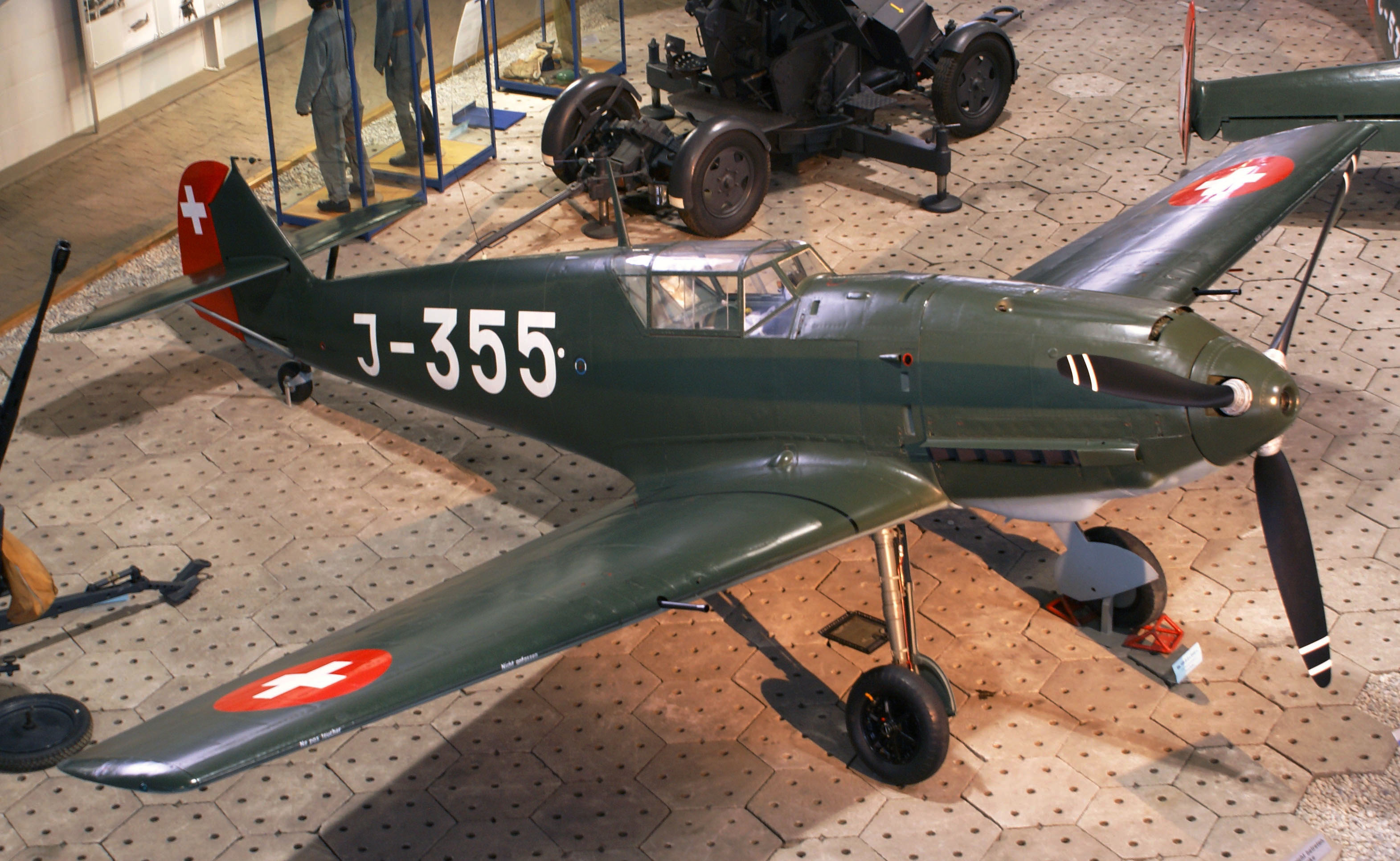
A Bf 109 E-3 of the Swiss Air Force.

Switzerland took delivery of the first of its 115 Bf 109s in 1938 when ten Bf 109Ds were delivered. After this, 80 109 E-3s that were purchased arrived from April 1939 until just before the German invasion of France in summer 1940. During the war, a further four 109s (two Fs and two Gs) were acquired by the Swiss Air Force through internment. The 109Es were supplemented by eight aircraft licence manufactured from spare parts by Doflug at Altenrhein, delivered in 1944.

In April 1944, 12 further G-6s were acquired in exchange for the destruction of a highly secret Messerschmitt Bf 110G night fighter which made an emergency landing in Switzerland. The new 109Gs suffered from numerous manufacturing defects and after problematic service were withdrawn from use by May 1948. The 109Es continued in service until December 1949.

With the start of the Battle of France, Swiss fighters began intercepting and occasionally fighting German aircraft intruding Swiss airspace. On 10 May 1940, several Swiss Bf 109s engaged a German Dornier Do 17 near the border at Bütschwil; in the ensuing exchange of fire, the Dornier was hit and eventually forced to land near Altenrhein.

On 1 June, the Flugwaffe dispatched 12 Bf 109 E-1s to engage 36 unescorted German Heinkel He 111s of Kampfgeschwader 53 that were crossing Swiss airspace to attack the Lyon–Marseille railway system. The Swiss Air force sustained its first casualty in the engagement when Sub Lieutenant Rudolf Rickenbacher was killed when the fuel tank of his Bf 109 exploded after being hit by the Heinkel's return fire. However, the Swiss "Emils" shot down six He 111s.

On 8 June, a C-35 observation aircraft, an antiquated biplane, was attacked over the Jura Mountains by two German Bf 110s; the pilot and observer were killed. Later on the same day, Swiss Captain Lindecker led about 15 Swiss Emils to intercept a formation of German He 111s escorted by II./Zerstörergeschwader 1's Bf 110s. The engagement resulted in five Bf 110s being shot down (including the Staffelkapitän Gerhard Kadow) for the loss of one Swiss Bf 109.

In the latter stages of the war, Swiss Messerschmitts were painted with red and white striped "neutrality markings" around the fuselage and main wings to avoid confusion with German 109s.

== Service with Yugoslavia ==
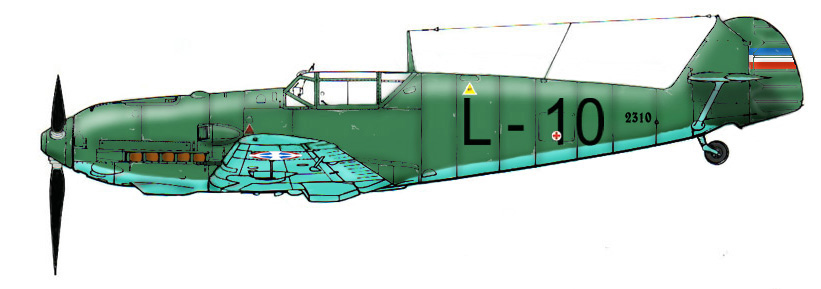
Bf 109 E-3 from 6th fighter regiment of Royal Yugoslav Air Force, April 1941

During the late 1930s, Yugoslavia embarked in an ambitious modernization program of its air force. So, from 1939 to 1941, Vazduhoplovstvo Vojske Kraljevine Yugoslavije (VVKJ – Royal Yugoslav Air Force) received 83 Bf 109 E-3s with the first two aircraft delivered in beginning of 1939. However, the aircraft were grounded most of the time due to a lack of spare parts, which was a German war tactic. The Yugoslav pilots were not happy with the Bf 109 after several landing accidents due to the Messerschmitt's narrow landing gear and constant mechanical failures. On 6 April 1941, first day of the Axis invasion of Yugoslavia, VVKJ had in service 54 Messerschmitt Bf 109E-3as. The defense of Belgrade (6 LP 31 and 32nd group) saw the heaviest fighting with both Yugoslav and German Bf 109s going head to head. During the first day of the battle, Yugoslav pilots managed to destroy several German planes. By the end of the 12-day campaign, almost all Bf 109s had been destroyed, either in combat or by their crews, to prevent capture. Some of the surviving aircraft were later captured and sold to Romania.

After the Kingdom of Yugoslavia was defeated and occupied by the Axis powers, the new Independent State of Croatia (Nezavisna Država Hrvatska, NDH) was created. On 27 June, the Croatian Legion (Hrvatska Legija) was formed, on order of Ante Pavelić, to support German forces on the Eastern Front. The air component, Hrvatska Zrakoplovna Legija (HZL, Croatian Air Force Legion), was established on 12 of July. Named 4. Mjesovita zrakoplovna pukovnija (Mixed Air Force Regiment), it comprised two units: a bomber and a fighter group. The latter, Zrakoplovna lovacka skupina (ZLS), with 202 men, was sent to Germany and trained on Bf 109s. 10. Zrakoplovno lovacko jato (ZLJ, air force fighter squadron), equipped with 10 Bf 109F and one Bf 109E, was the first operative Croatian unit. Its first base was Poltava, in Ukraine, where it was subordinated to III./JG 52. There, 10. ZLS was renamed 15(Kroatische)./JG 52. The first air victories of Croatian aviation came on 2 November 1942. That day, Hauptmann Vladimir Ferencina (future 10 kills ace) and Leutnant Baumgarten claimed a Polikarpov I-16 Rata each, near Rostov. By the end of the war, 17 Croatian pilots had achieved the status of ace, flying the Bf 109, the top scoring being Mato Dukovac, with 44 kills.

At the end of the conflict, 17 Luftwaffe and Croatian Air Force Bf 109s were found by Yugoslav Partisans on Yugoslav territory. These aircraft saw very limited service at the end of the war flying a few sorties against Chetnik and Croat forces in May 1945. These aircraft saw little use after the end of the fighting, and were scrapped in 1947. In 1947, Bulgaria realised that it had a surplus of aircraft above what would be allowed by the Paris Peace Treaties, and it was decided that they would be transferred to Yugoslavia. In total, 53 Bf 109Gs (known as Me 109s in Yugoslav service) and six two-seater conversions (designated UMe-109s) were transferred by 1949. The 83rd and 172 Fighter Regiment of the SFR Yugoslav Air Force continued to operate the 109 until 1952 when they were replaced in service by American Republic F-47D Thunderbolt.

== Combat service with Romania ==
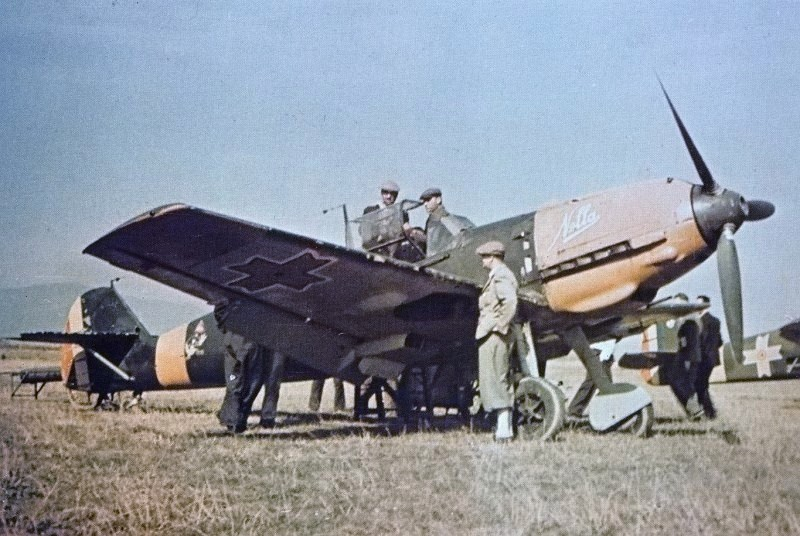
Romanian Messerschmitt Bf 109E

The Royal Romanian Air Force (Aeronautica Regală Română, ARR) operated Bf 109Es and Gs against the Soviet Union, at first, and – after the "change of fronts" that followed the coup d'état led by King Michael I of Romania in August 1944 – against the Germans. The first batch delivered by Messerschmitt to Romanians was of 50 Bf 109E-3/E-4 that equipped Escadrila 56, 57 and 58. In June 1942, the three Escadrile of Grupul 7 Vânătoare, led by Captain Commander C. Grigore, had still 12 Bf 109Es each.

Between 28 March and 1 July 1943, Grupul 7, led by Lt. Col. Radu Gheorghe, operated with units of Luftwaffe JG 3 Udet, on South-Eastern Ukraine. In this period of "free hunting", the Romanians – among them Escadrila 57's commander, Capt Alexandru Șerbănescu – proved very successful. In just two days, the pilots of Grupul 7 shot down 23 Soviet aircraft. By the end of 1943, the exhausted Grupul 7 was replaced on the frontline by Grupul 9 which recently converted to the Bf 109G.

On 23 August 1944, after King Michael's Coup removed the government of Ion Antonescu, which had aligned Romania with Nazi Germany, the Romanian pilots had to fight the Luftwaffe and the Hungarians with their Messerschmitts.

== Combat service with Francoist Spain ==
Already on the evening of 22 June 1941, day of German invasion of USSR, the Spanish Foreign Minister offered the German Ambassador in Madrid volunteers to fight “against Bolshevism”. Spanish volunteers formed the so-called Blue Division, 250 I.D. (Infantry Division) of the Wehrmacht and the Escuadrilla Azul, a fighter squadron, the first of five units, that flew mostly Bf 109s. The 1.ª Escuadrilla de Caza left the Spanish capital already on 25 June 1941, with 17 pilots. These airmen, during the Spanish Civil War, had shot down a total of 179 Republican aircraft. Their leader was Comandante Ángel Salas Larrazábal, a 17 kills ace. After a training in Germany, on 5 September 1941, the Spaniards were equipped with new Bf 109E-7s and sent on the Soviet front. On 26 September, the 1.ª Escuadrilla de Caza with its 12 Messerschmitts flew to Minsk, then to its operational base of Moznha, where formed a squadron of Jagdgeschwader 27, the 15.(Span.)/JG 27. Few days later, Comandante Larrazábal scored the first two kills of the Escuadrilla Azul, shooting down one I-16 Rata and a Petlyakov Pe-2 reconnaissance bomber and Wolfram Freiherr von Richthofen, then Commanding General of VIII. Fliegerkorps, awarded him with the Iron Cross 2nd class, on 5 October.

The 1.ª Escuadrilla was based in Vitebsk when, on 6 January 1942, received the order to retreat to Spain. In 460 sorties, Spaniards had claimed 10 aircraft destroyed in the air plus four on the ground, but had lost five pilots. The 2.ª Escuadrilla Azul was formed by Comandante Julio Salvador y Díaz-Benjumea, a 24 kills ace in Spanish Civil War. Diaz-Benjumea would be appointed Minister of Aviation by Franco in 1969.

After a training in Germany, the new Escuadrilla Azul was equipped with Bf109F-4 and listed as 15. (span.) JG 51. The Spaniards were deployed to Orel. The 2.ª Escuadrilla flew 403 operational sorties and was credited with 13 kills. It suffered just two losses. On 30 November 1942, the 3.ª Escuadrilla arrived to Orel for the official relief of the 2nd Squadron, still in Orel. The following day, the 3.ª Escuadrilla suffered its first loss, when Capitan Andrés Alvarez-Arenas was shot down and captured by Soviets.

The Spaniards scored just two kills up to 27 January 1943 when they were credited with seven kills. The Spanish pilots fought up to Spring 1944 against Soviet Union. They flew more than 3,000 operational sorties, they achieved 159 kills and suffered a loss rate or 30% (including wounded).

== Service with Japan ==
Five Bf 109 E-7s were acquired by the Japanese in 1941, without armament, for evaluation. While in Japan, they received the standard Japanese hinomarus and yellow wing leading edges, as well as white numerals on the rudder. A red band outlined in white was painted around the rear fuselage.

They were used in comparison trials by the Japanese Army Air Force with the Nakajima Ki-43 Hayabusa, Nakajima Ki-44 Shoki and the Kawasaki Ki-61 Hien. As the Japanese were interested in the DB 601 engine and license-built it for their Kawasaki Ki-61 Hien fighter and early Yokosuka D4Y Suisei dive bombers, they had little interest in the Bf 109 itself.

The Allies, expecting to encounter Japanese Bf 109s in combat, assigned a code name of “Mike” to the Messerschmitts. None were flown in combat by the Japanese.

== Allied Bf 109s ==
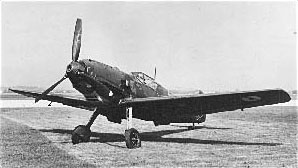
Bf 109 E-3, White 1 of 1./JG 76, in RAF markings; Wright Field, Ohio, May 1942

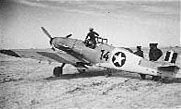
A captured Bf 109G in US markings, Tunisia 1943

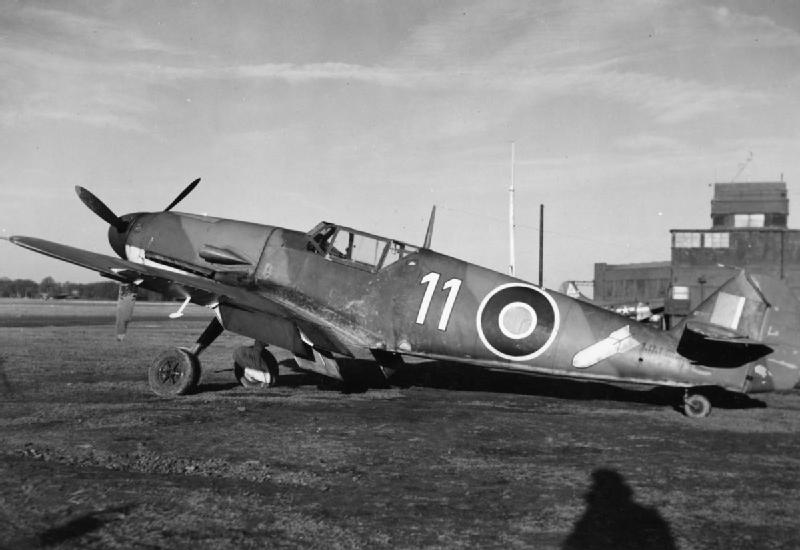
A captured German Messerschmitt Bf 109 F-4 in RAF markings, operated by No. 1426 Flight RAF

=== Royal Air Force and Commonwealth ===
Several Bf 109s models and marks came into the RAF's hands in various ways throughout the war, including captures by Allied ground troops, forced or mistaken landings by German pilots, and defections. They were then passed to the Air Fighting Development Unit where they were extensively tested before passing them on to the RAF's No. 1426 (Enemy Aircraft) Flight, nicknamed "the Rafwaffe". They operated six Bf 109 overall, captured by French or British troops between November 1939 and 1943.

Other Bf 109s captured and operated by the RAF and Commonwealth air forces included the following:

- In December 1941, a Bf 109 was captured at Gazala airfield and tested by the RAF.
- In May 1942, a Bf 109F–4/B of 10.(Jabo)/JG 26 was damaged by anti-aircraft fire and belly–landed at Beachy Head. It was flown by the RAF until the end of the war.
- Several Bf 109s were captured and tested by the SAAF: Bf 109 G-4 “Black 13” was captured in Tunisia. Another G-4 was captured in Sicily. A Croat G-14 “Black 10” deserted to Italy and landed in Jessi, and taken over by 3 Wing SAAF. Another G-14 “Black 4” was handed over to the USAAF, who gave it to the Italians, and then turned over to the Polish Air Force. A Bf 109 F-2 trop was captured at Maple Arch in 1942. The most famous one is the Bf 109 F-4/Trop of JG27 captured at Derna in December 1941, known as coded "Yellow 2". It was repaired and flown out just before the Germans recaptured the airfield in January 1942.
- In November 1942, a Bf 109 G-2(trop) was abandoned by JG27 and captured by the RAAF near Tobruk. It was repaired by 3rd Squadron and repainted in a RAF scheme, given the squadron code "CV-V" and evaluated in North Africa. Then, in late 1943, it was transferred to the UK.
- Another Bf 109 F-4/Trop was captured on Martuba airfield by RAAF 3rd Squadron during Operation Crusader in 1941.
- A Bf 109 G-6(trop) was captured in North Africa in 1943 and returned to the UK for evaluation by the AFDU, coded VX101. The 109 was written off after forced landing at RAF Thorney Island on 19 May 1944.
- A Bf 109 G-14 was captured by the British in the end of 1944 at Gilze-Rijen, Netherlands.

=== France ===
- In September 1939 a Bf 109D was captured by the French.
- A Bf 109 E-3, WNr. 1340, was captured in France and was tested versus the Dewoitine D.520 and Bloch 152. It was an aircraft of 1./JG 76 flown by Fw. Karl Hier, forced to land near Woerth on 22 November 1939. It was transferred to the RAF on 2 May 1940, and later sent to the US in April 1942.

Several Bf 109Es were captured intact by the French shortly after the outbreak of war. They were taken to the flight test center at Bricy and were the subject of thorough descriptive performance trials by the French Aeronautical Service. At the conclusion of the French trials at least two Bf 109Es, still in French markings, were sent to Boscombe Down.

=== Soviet Union ===
- On 4 December 1937, during the Spanish Civil war, a Bf 109 A-0, marked 6–15, made an emergency landing behind Republican lines. The aircraft was recovered and tested. In January 1938 the aircraft was also evaluated by a French delegation. This aircraft was later sent to the Soviet Union and also tested. During the war, this aircraft served with a special Soviet reconnaissance unit equipped with captured German aircraft, before it was captured back by JG 27.
- On 22 February 1942, Oberleutnant A. Niss, of 8./JG 51 got lost and was fired on from a machine gun near Tushino Airfield. His radiator and fuel tank were damaged and he was forced to land his Bf 109 F-2, WNr. 9209, within Soviet positions. It was handed over to the Air Forces Scientific Research Institute for comprehensive testing.
- On May 29, 1942, a pair of German Bf 109 F-4 of III./JG3 ran out of fuel and made a forced landing behind the front lines. They were prepared for flight tests at the Red Army Air Force Research Institute. Later one transferred to the US, where it became EB 1 (Evaluation Branch).
- Bf 109 G-2, WNr. 13903 from I./JG 3, was captured near Stalingrad in late autumn 1942. It was used to compare its performance with Soviet experimental and series-produced fighters.

=== United States ===
- Bf 109 F-4, “Yellow 9”, WNr. 7640, was captured in the Soviet Union and at the request of the U.S. they handed it over to them in March 1943, where it became EB 1 (Evaluation Branch).
- Luftwaffe Bf 109 G-6 trop, WNr.16416, was captured by the USAAF in May 1943 at Soliman airfield, originally belonging to JG 77. Subsequently, it was disassembled, shipped and re-assembled in the United States at Wright Airfield for testing. On 25 December, after simple repairs, it was flown to the Air Forces Scientific Research Institute.
- A Messerschmitt Bf 109G-2 with the name “Irmgard” painted on the side was captured in March 1943 in North Africa by the 79th Fighter Group.
- On 28 August 1944, Romanian pilot Cpt. Cantacuzino flew a Bf 109 G-6, WNr. 66130, with American prisoner Lt.Col. James A. Gunn III to Foggia, Italy. The aircraft was tested and after some flights was destroyed.

== Aces flying the Bf 109 ==
The Bf 109 was flown by the three top-scoring fighter aces of World War II: Erich Hartmann, the top-scoring fighter pilot of all time claiming 352 victories, Gerhard Barkhorn with 301 victories, and Günther Rall claiming 275 victories. All of them flew with Jagdgeschwader 52, a unit which exclusively flew the Bf 109 and was credited with over 10,000 victories, chiefly on the Eastern Front. Hans-Joachim Marseille, the highest scoring German ace in the North African Campaign, also claimed all of his 158 victories flying the Bf 109, against Western Allied pilots.

The Bf 109 was also used with good results by non-German pilots, such as the Finnish fighter ace Ilmari Juutilainen with 94 victories, the highest-scoring non-German fighter ace in World War II, Romanian fighter ace Alexandru Şerbănescu with 47 victories, Croatian fighter ace Mato Dukovac with 44 victories and Hungarian fighter ace Szentgyörgyi Dezső with 29 (+1 German) confirmed and six unconfirmed victories.
