= Experimental Squadron =

Experimental Squadron or experimental squadron may refer to:

- Experimental Squadron (Royal Navy), sent out in the 1830s and 1840s by the Royal Navy
- No. 10 Squadron RCN, Royal Canadian Naval Air Service
- Zirkus Rosarius, one of the Luftwaffe's wartime experimental and research squadrons
- VFA-94 in the United States Air Force
