= Technical Air Intelligence Unit =

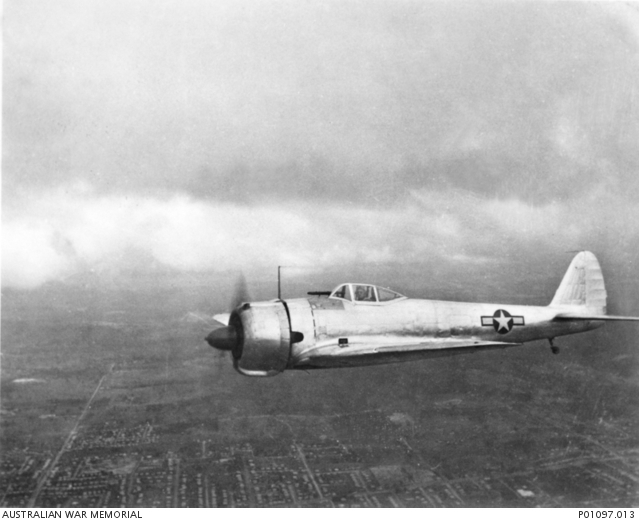
A Nakajima Ki-43 Hayabusa ("Oscar") (often confused with the Mitsubishi A6M "Zero") flying over Brisbane, Australia in 1943. The Ki-43 was reconstructed from several captured aircraft, by the Technical Air Intelligence Unit (TAIU), at Hangar 7 at Eagle Farm, Brisbane.

Technical Air Intelligence Units (TAIU) were joint Allied military intelligence units formed during World War II to recover Japanese aircraft to obtain data regarding their technical and tactical capabilities.

The first such unit, known later as Technical Air Intelligence Unit–South West Pacific (TAIU–SWPA), was formed in November 1942 by the United States Navy (USN), United States Army Air Forces (USAAF) and Royal Australian Air Force (RAAF) at Eagle Farm Airbase, Brisbane, Australia, in November 1942.

During 1943–44, three other TAIUs were formed in the other Allied theatres of the Pacific War.

- South East Asia: ATAIU–SEA; British Royal Air Force (RAF)/USAAF
- Pacific Ocean Areas: TAIU–POA; USN
- China: Republic of China Air Force

A proposed joint U.S. Army-U.S. Navy research unit in the continental United States was never established, as neither service was prepared to work with the other. Some Japanese aircraft were tested in the US, at various bases, by pilots from the Naval Air Test Center, the USAAF Test Training Unit (which was established with the assistance of RAF technical intelligence units in Europe) and the National Advisory Committee for Aeronautics.

Crashed and captured aircraft were located, identified, and evaluated (often in or near the front lines), before being recovered for further tests. Aircraft that were not too badly damaged were rebuilt for test flights that revealed vulnerabilities that could be exploited. Examination of the materials used in the construction of aircraft allowed the Allies to analyse Japanese war production. The unit also absorbed a small team who developed the code name system for Japanese aircraft, and produced aircraft recognition charts and photographs.

== Early technical air intelligence operations ==
After the attack on Pearl Harbor, several shot down aircraft were recovered from Hawaii and examined by the Naval Air Test Center and the USAAF Test Training Unit, who completed their own separate studies. A Mitsubishi A6M "Zero" of the Imperial Japanese Navy Air Service made a forced landing in June 1942 on Akutan Island, off Alaska. The aircraft (known later as the "Akutan Zero") was recovered by the USN and shipped to NAS North Island, California, where it was repaired and made a number of test flights to determine its performance and capabilities.

In late 1942, the Australian Army captured lightly damaged or incomplete examples of the Nakajima Ki-43 Hayabusa ("Oscar") – the main fighter used by the Imperial Japanese Army Air Force during the war – in Papua New Guinea. The Ki-43s were discovered nearly intact at Buna Airfield, after the Battle of Buna–Gona, and were shipped to Australia for examination.

== TAIU operations ==
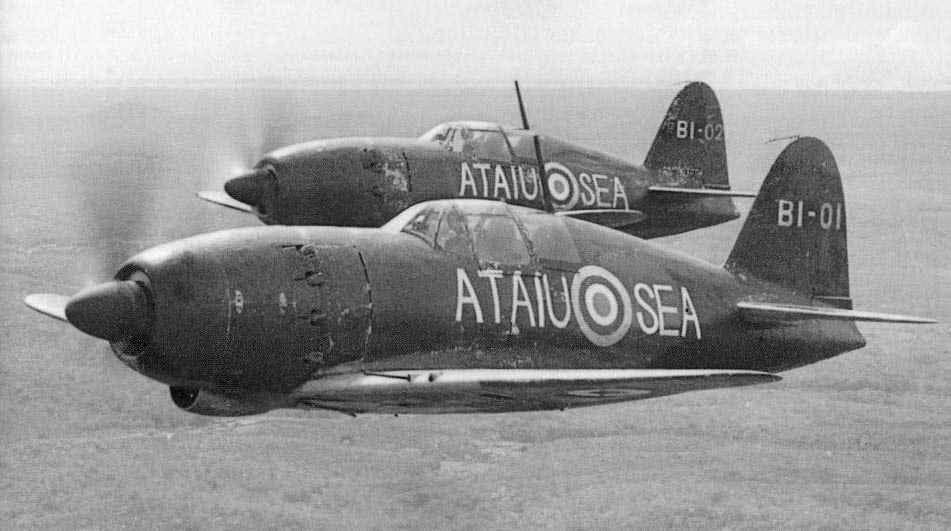
Japanese Mitsubishi J2Ms with ATAIU-SEA markings in flight over British Malaya in December 1945, during evaluation by Royal Air Force officers from RAF Seletar.

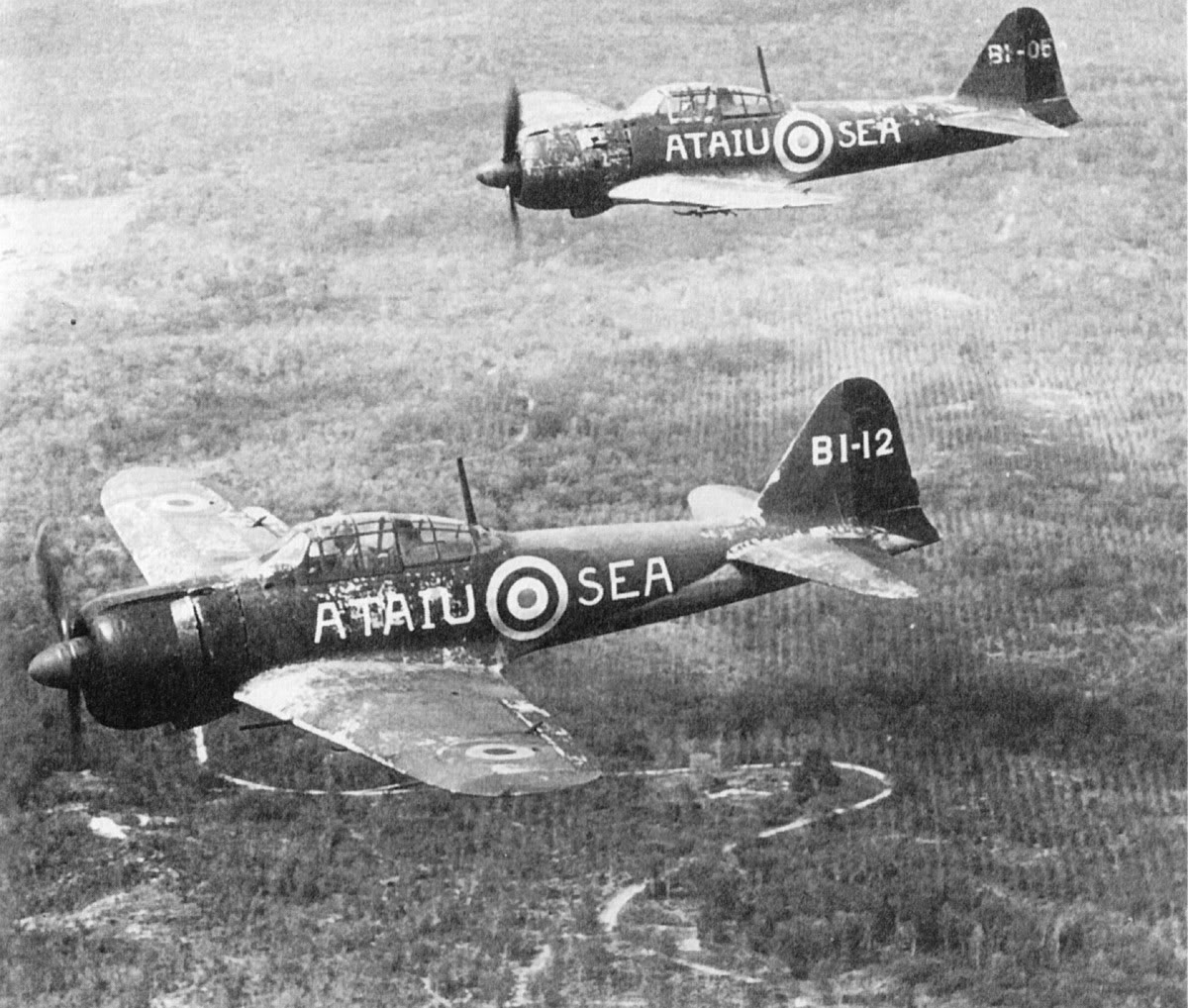
A6M2 (left) and A6M5 Zero in Malaya being tested and evaluated by Japanese pilots under the supervision of RAF officers. The A6M5's cockpit survives today at the Imperial War Museum Duxford.

In order to consolidate and co-ordinate these different operations, the Technical Air Intelligence Unit was formed, based in Hangar 7 at the RAAF/USAAF Eagle Farm Airbase, in Brisbane, Australia, during November 1942. By early 1943 an "Oscar" had been built using parts from five different aircraft. Test flights included a mock dogfight against a Spitfire V. It was concluded that the "Oscar" was superior to the Spitfire below 20,000 feet. In late 1943 the aircraft was shipped to the United States aboard the escort carrier Copahee, and sent to Wright Field where it was flown and evaluated.

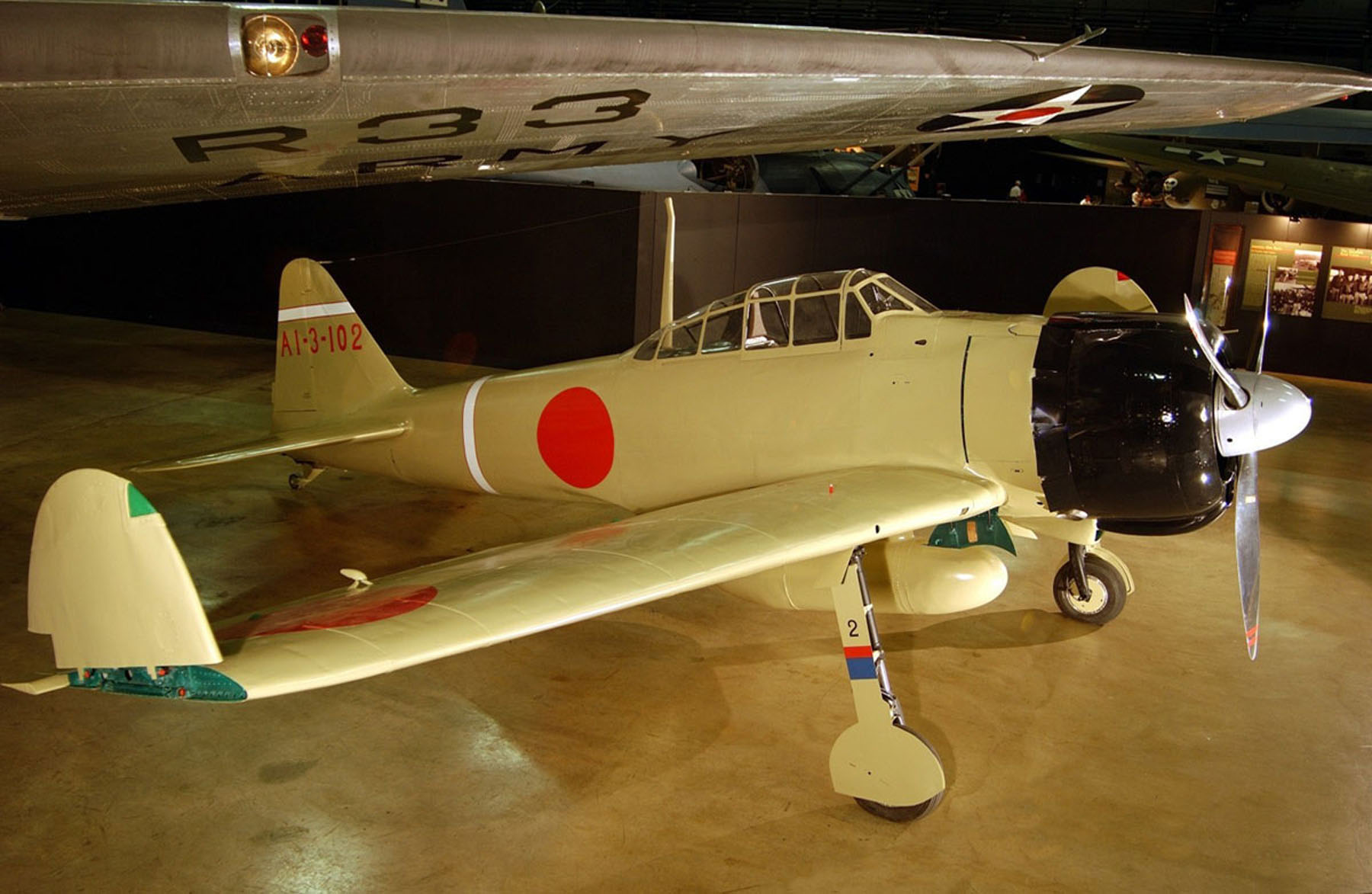
Mitsubishi A6M2 "Zero" at the National Museum of the United States Air Force at Dayton, Ohio. This aircraft was found near Kavieng on New Ireland, Papua New Guinea, and probably operated by the 6th Kokutai (Squadron) and later by the 253rd Kokutai. It is painted to represent a section leader's aircraft from the aircraft carrier Zuihō during the Battle of the Bismarck Sea in March 1943.

Further success came in late December 1943, when US Marines captured the airfield at Cape Gloucester on the north coast of New Britain, finding many wrecks and several nearly intact aircraft. TAIU officers logged the serial numbers of the aircraft, and engine configurations, serial numbers and dates of manufacture. They inspected cockpits for layout and control locations, and armour plate. They recovered armaments, including a Kawasaki Ki-45 "Nick" fighter, about which little was known. Another fighter, a Kawasaki Ki-61 "Tony", was also examined.

One of the biggest problems faced by the TAIU teams was Allied troops, who commonly stripped enemy aircraft for "souvenirs". Efforts were made to minimize souvenir hunting, but most of these efforts were in vain, and it remained a constant problem throughout the war. Another obstacle was that most Japanese aircraft fell into the ocean, and those that did not often crashed in isolated areas that were difficult to reach. The TAIU had to recruit local men to cut a trail to the crash site with machetes, and then carry out the engine on a cradle woven from tree bark.

Crashed Enemy Aircraft Reports (CEARs) were systematically compiled from April 1943. In February 1944, it was agreed that production data on enemy equipment was essential, and more extensive reports detailed the age and condition of captured equipment to give an indication of the general state of the Japanese war economy, paying particular attention to the name plates and markings which gave information on the manufacturers. Eventually a special unit known as "JAPLATE" was created to conduct this task, and 6,336 intact name plates or their details were collected.

In mid-1944, U.S. Navy personnel were withdrawn from the TAIU and reassigned to NAS Anacosta to form the Technical Air Intelligence Centre (TAIC) to centralise and co-ordinate the work of test centres in the United States with the work of TAIUs in the field. The unit was then renamed TAIU for the South West Pacific Area (TAIU-SWPA).

Technical Air Intelligence operations were fully developed by the time of the invasion of the Philippines. Considerable instruction was given to the troops on the equipment likely to be found and the importance of its preservation. Aircraft acquired there included examples of the Mitsubishi A6M Zero, Mitsubishi J2M "Jack", Kawasaki Ki-45 "Nick", Kawasaki Ki-61 "Tony", Kawanishi N1K "George", Nakajima Ki-44 "Tojo", and Nakajima Ki-84 "Frank" fighters; the Nakajima B5N "Kate", Nakajima B6N "Jill", Yokosuka D4Y "Judy", and Mitsubishi G4M "Betty" bombers; the Showa L2D "Tabby" transport, and the Mitsubishi Ki-46 "Dinah" reconnaissance aircraft.

== Other Technical Air Intelligence Units ==
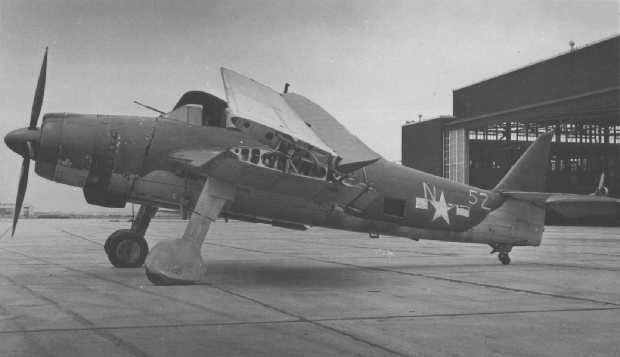
One Aichi B7A Ryusei tested for the ATAIU-SEA.

A joint RAF/USAAF unit, known as the TAIU for South East Asia (ATAIU-SEA) was formed in Calcutta in late 1943, and disbanded at Singapore in 1946. Two other units were also created; "TAIU for the Pacific Ocean Area" (TAIU-POA), a U.S. Navy unit which operated in the Pacific Islands, and "TAIU for China" (TAIU-CHINA) under the control of Chiang Kai-shek's Nationalists.

== Post-war operations ==
Technical Air Intelligence Units operated in Japan after the end of the war, shifting from tactical intelligence to post-hostilities investigations. General Hap Arnold ordered the preservation of four of every type of aircraft. By the end of 1945 these were collected together at Yokohama Naval Base. One hundred and fifteen aircraft were shipped to the United States, with 73 going to the Army and 42 to the Navy. However, lack of funds, storage space and interest meant that only six aircraft were restored, flown and evaluated by the Army and only two by the Navy. Eventually, 46 complete aircraft were sent to various museums while the rest were scrapped. By early 1946 ATAIU-SEA in Singapore had collected 64 Japanese Army and Navy aircraft, most in flyable condition, for shipment to the UK. However, lack of shipping space prevented this operation and only four eventually arrived in England to be put in display in museums.

== See also ==
- Air Fighting Development Unit (RAF)
- Air Technical Intelligence Center (ATIC), established in 1951 as a USAF field activity
- No. 1426 Flight RAF
- Operation Lusty
- Zirkus Rosarius
