= Mitsubishi Ki-46 =

Aircraft in Japan

Ki-46
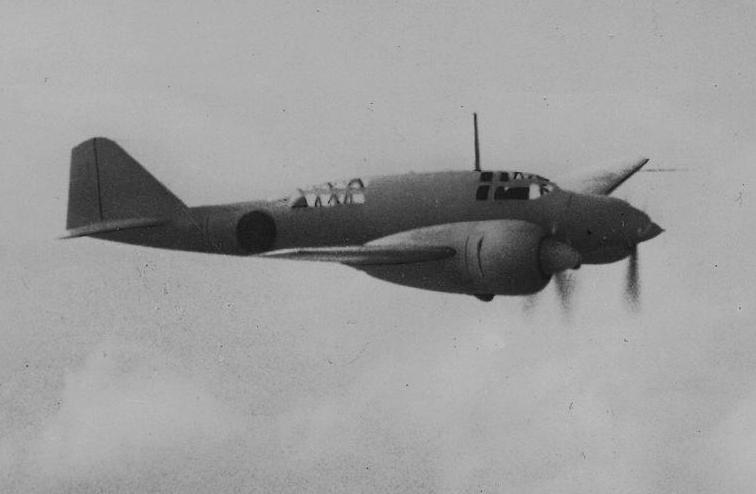
- A Mitsubishi Ki-46-II "Dinah" of the Shimoshizu Army Flying School in flight.

General information
- Type: Twin-engine reconnaissance aircraft
- Manufacturer: Mitsubishi Aircraft Company
- Primary user: Imperial Japanese Army Air Force
- Number built: 1,742

History
- Introduction date: July 1941
- First flight: November 1939
- Retired: September 1945

The Mitsubishi Ki-46 is a twin-engine reconnaissance aircraft that was used by the Imperial Japanese Army in World War II. Its Army Shiki designation was Type 100 Command Reconnaissance Aircraft (一〇〇式司令部偵察機); the Allied brevity code name was "Dinah".

== Development and design ==
On 12 December 1937, the Imperial Japanese Army Air Force issued a specification to Mitsubishi for a long-range strategic reconnaissance aircraft to replace the Mitsubishi Ki-15. The specification demanded an endurance of six hours and sufficient speed to evade interception by any fighter in existence or development, but otherwise did not constrain the design by a team led by Tomio Kubo and Jojo Hattori.

The resulting design was a twin-engined, low-winged monoplane with a retractable tailwheel undercarriage. It had a small diameter oval fuselage which accommodated a crew of two, with the pilot and observer situated in individual cockpits separated by a large fuel tank. Further fuel tanks were situated in the thin wings both inboard and outboard of the engines, giving a total fuel capacity of 1,490 L (328 imperial gallons). The engines, two Mitsubishi Ha-26s, were housed in close fitting cowlings developed by the Aeronautical Research Institute of the Tokyo Imperial University to reduce drag and improve pilot view.

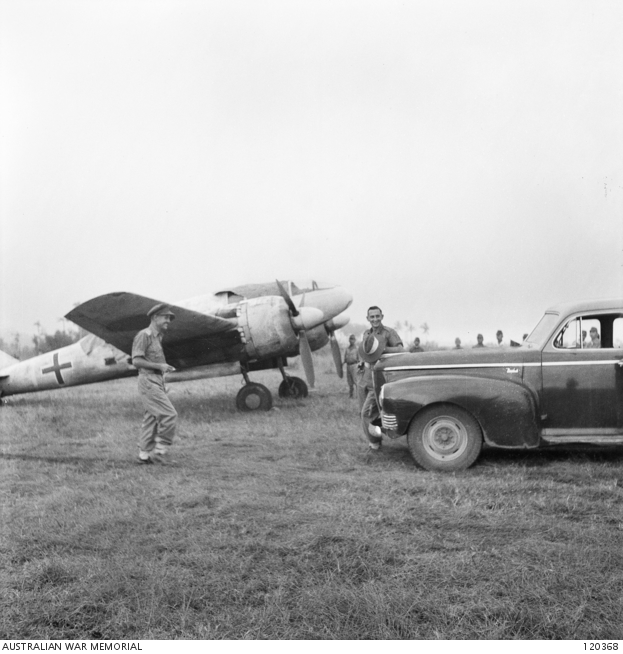
Mitsubishi Ki-46-III white painted with a green cross on the rear fuselage as a sign of surrender, captured by KNIL forces on October 3, 1945. Menado, Celebes.

The first prototype aircraft, with the designation Ki-46, flew in November 1939 from the Mitsubishi factory at Kakamigahara, Gifu, north of Nagoya. Tests showed that the Ki-46 was underpowered, and slower than required, only reaching 540 km/h (336 mph) rather than the specified 600 km/h (373 mph). Otherwise, the aircraft tests were successful. Because the type was still faster than the Army's latest fighter, the Nakajima Ki-43, as well as the Navy's new A6M2, an initial production batch was ordered as the Army Type 100 Command Reconnaissance Plane Model 1 (Ki-46-I).

To solve the performance problems, Mitsubishi fitted Ha-102 engines, which were Ha-26s fitted with a two-speed supercharger, while increasing fuel capacity and reducing empty weight. This version, designated Ki-46-II, first flew in March 1941. It met the speed requirements of the original specification, and was ordered into full-scale production, with deliveries starting in July.

Although at first the Ki-46 proved almost immune from interception, the Imperial Japanese Army Air Force realised that improved Allied fighters such as the Supermarine Spitfire and P-38 Lightning could challenge this superiority, and in July 1942, it instructed Mitsubishi to produce a further improved version, the Ki-46-III. This had more powerful, fuel-injected Mitsubishi Ha-112 engines, and a redesigned nose, with a fuel tank ahead of the pilot and a new canopy, smoothly faired from the extreme nose of the aircraft, eliminating the "step" of the earlier versions. The single defensive machine gun of the earlier aircraft was omitted not long into the production run. The new version first flew in December 1942, demonstrating significantly higher speed 630 km/h (391 mph) at 6,000 m (19,700 ft). The performance of the Ki-46-III even proved superior to that of the aircraft intended to replace it (the Tachikawa Ki-70), which as a result did not enter production. During operational testing in March 1944, it was discovered that replacing the engines' single exhaust collector ring with individual pipes provided extra thrust and an increase in top speed to 642 km/h (399 mph).

In an attempt to yet further improve the altitude performance of the Ki-46, two prototypes were fitted with exhaust driven turbosupercharged Ha-112-II-Ru engines. This version first flew in February 1944, but only two prototypes were built.

Mitsubishi factories made a total of 1,742 examples of all versions (34 x Ki-46-I, 1093 x Ki-46-II, 613 x Ki-46-III, 4 x Ki-46-IV) from 1941 to 1944.

== Operational history ==
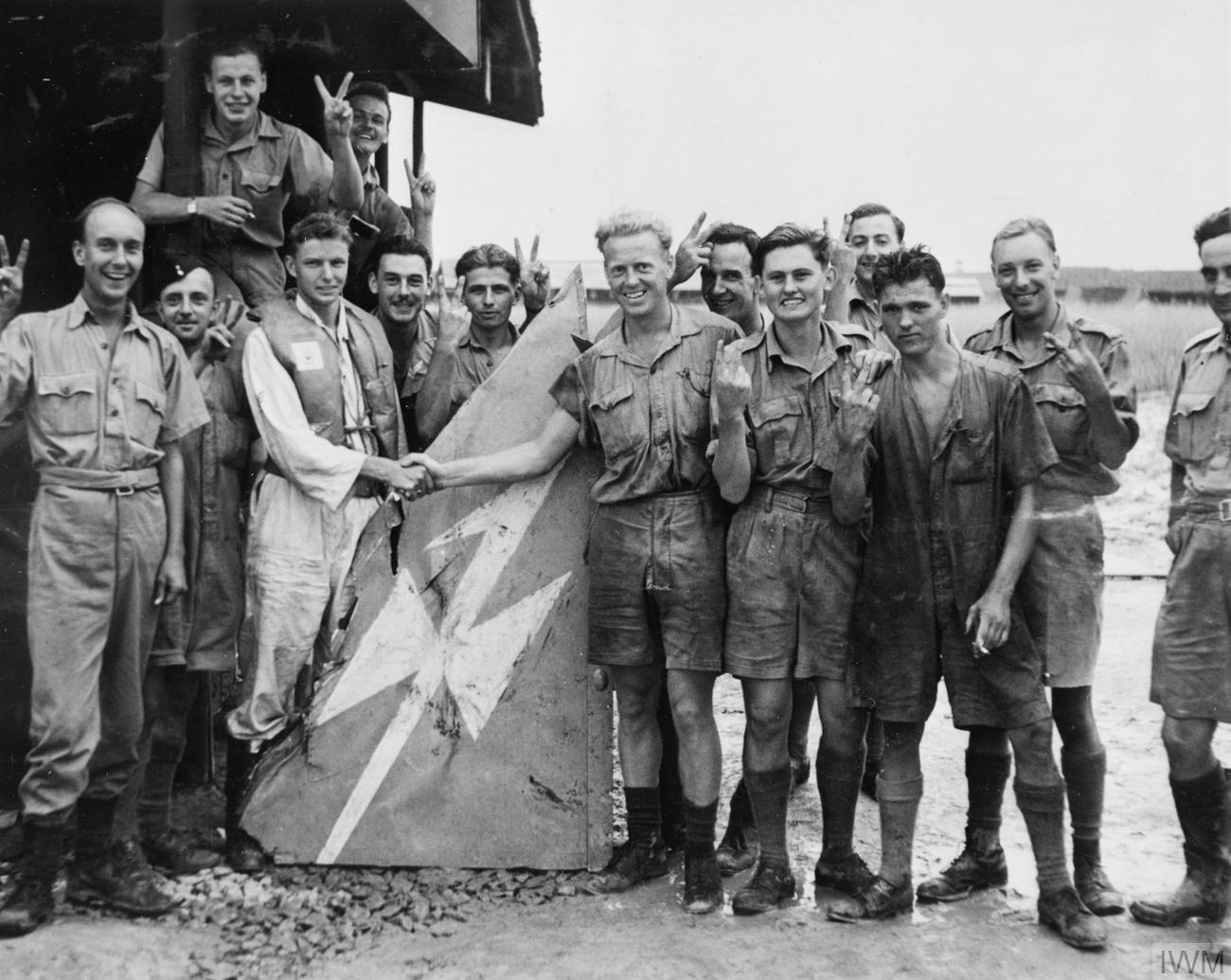
Buffalo pilots of No. 243 Squadron RAF based at Kallang display the tail fin of a Mitsubishi Ki-46 which they shot down over Johore, Malaya, on 10 January 1942

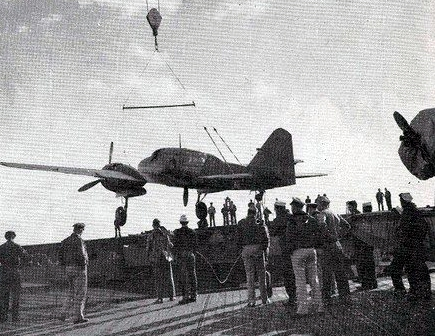
A captured Mitsubishi Ki-46 being loaded aboard the U.S. Navy escort carrier USS Attu, 1944

This aircraft was first used by the Japanese Army in Manchukuo and China, where seven units were equipped with it, and also at times by the Japanese Imperial Navy in certain reconnaissance missions over the northern coasts of Australia and New Guinea.

The Japanese Army used this aircraft for the same type of missions, which were not authorized, over present-day Malaysia during the months before the Pacific War. Later, it was used for high altitude reconnaissance over Burma, Indochina, Thailand, and the Indian Ocean. The Ki-46 was regarded by the British RAF in Burma as a difficult aircraft to counter, only occasionally intercepting them successfully. On September 25, 1944, Flying Officer Wittridge shot down a Ki-46, using a personally modified Spitfire Mk VIII. Wittridge had removed two machine guns and the seat armour and also polished the wing leading edges to gain extra speed. The leading American fighter pilot Richard Bong, flying a P-38 Lightning, managed to shoot down a Ki-46 over the coast of Papua New Guinea in late 1942 without any special modifications to his airplane.

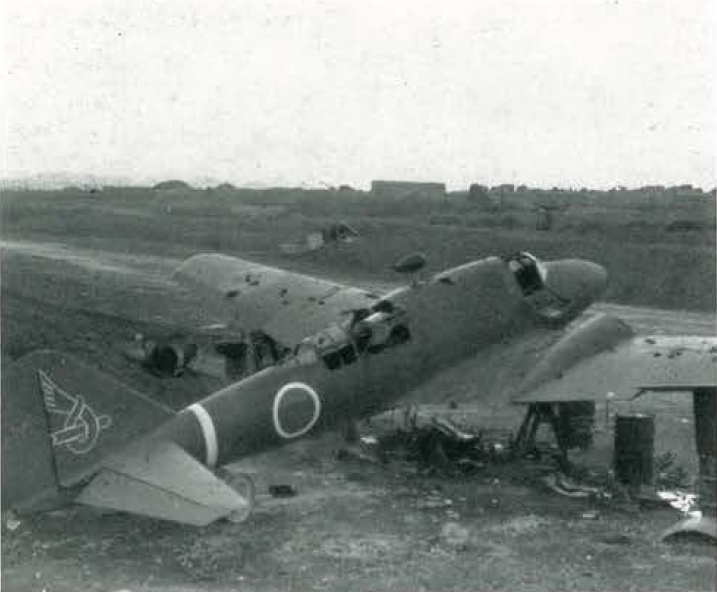
An abandoned Mitsubishi Ki-46 II on Okinawa, June 1945

In 1944–45, during the last days of the war, it was modified as a high-altitude interceptor, with two 20 mm cannons in the nose and one 37 mm (1.46 in) cannon in an "upwards-and-forwards" position, almost like the Luftwaffe's Schräge Musik night fighter cannon emplacements, for fighting USAAF B-29 Superfortresses over the metropolitan Japanese islands. It lacked stability for sustained shooting of the 37 mm (1.46 in) weapon, had only a thin layer of armour plating, lacked self-sealing fuel tanks, and was slow to climb.

The Ki-46 was also assigned to two whole Sentai (wings/groups), as well as individual Chutaicho (junior operational commanders) in the Imperial Japanese Army Air Service, during the Pacific War.

The Allies captured some examples during the conflict, which were then repaired and flown for evaluation purposes. The Ki-46 III was the only Japanese aircraft type sent to the NII VVS Soviet Air Force Test Institute for evaluation during 1946–7.

== Variants ==
(note:- The Shiki designations must be used in full, as written below, because the Type number only refers to the year of the designs inception.)

Army Type 100 Command Reconnaissance Plane
The Shiki designation for the Ki-46 Command Reconnaissance Plane
Army Type 100 Air Defence Fighter
The Shiki designation for the Ki-46 Interceptor Fighter
Army Type 100 Assault Plane
The Shiki designation for the Ki-46 Assault Plane
Ki-46
Prototype.
Ki-46 I
Reconnaissance version of the Ki-46.
Ki-46 II
The first operational model of the series.
Ki-46 II KAI
Three-seat training version of the Ki-46. Used for radio and navigation training, with a redesigned cabin with a stepped dorsal extension. Conversions of the Ki-46 II.
Ki-46 III
"Traditional" stepped windshield replaced with a smooth, curved, glazed panel extended over the pilot's seat giving a more aerodynamic nose profile. Engine power increased to 1,500 hp (Ha-112-II), extra fuel tank added in the nose.
Ki-46 III-KAI
Defense interceptor/night fighter version of the Ki-46. Equipped with two 20 mm cannon in the nose and one 37 mm (1.46 in) cannon in the "Schräge Musik"-style upwards-aimed dorsal frontal position.
Ki-46 III
Land strike version of the Ki-46, without 37 mm (1.46 in) cannon armament.
Ki-46 IIIb
Ground-attack version.
Ki-46 IIIc
Unbuilt design project.
Ki-46 IV
Prototype, equipped with two turbocharged 1,119 kW (1,500 hp) Mitsubishi Ha-112-IIru engines, and more fuel capacity.
Ki-46 IVa/b
Series models of reconnaissance/fighter aircraft, unbuilt design projects

== Operators ==
France

- French Air Force – Captured aircraft.

Japan

- Imperial Japanese Army Air Force
- Imperial Japanese Navy Air Service

China

- Chinese Communist Air Force Two captured Ki-46s in communist Chinese hands served as a ground-attack aircraft and a trainer respectively, and the last Ki-46 retired in the early 1950s.

== Surviving aircraft ==
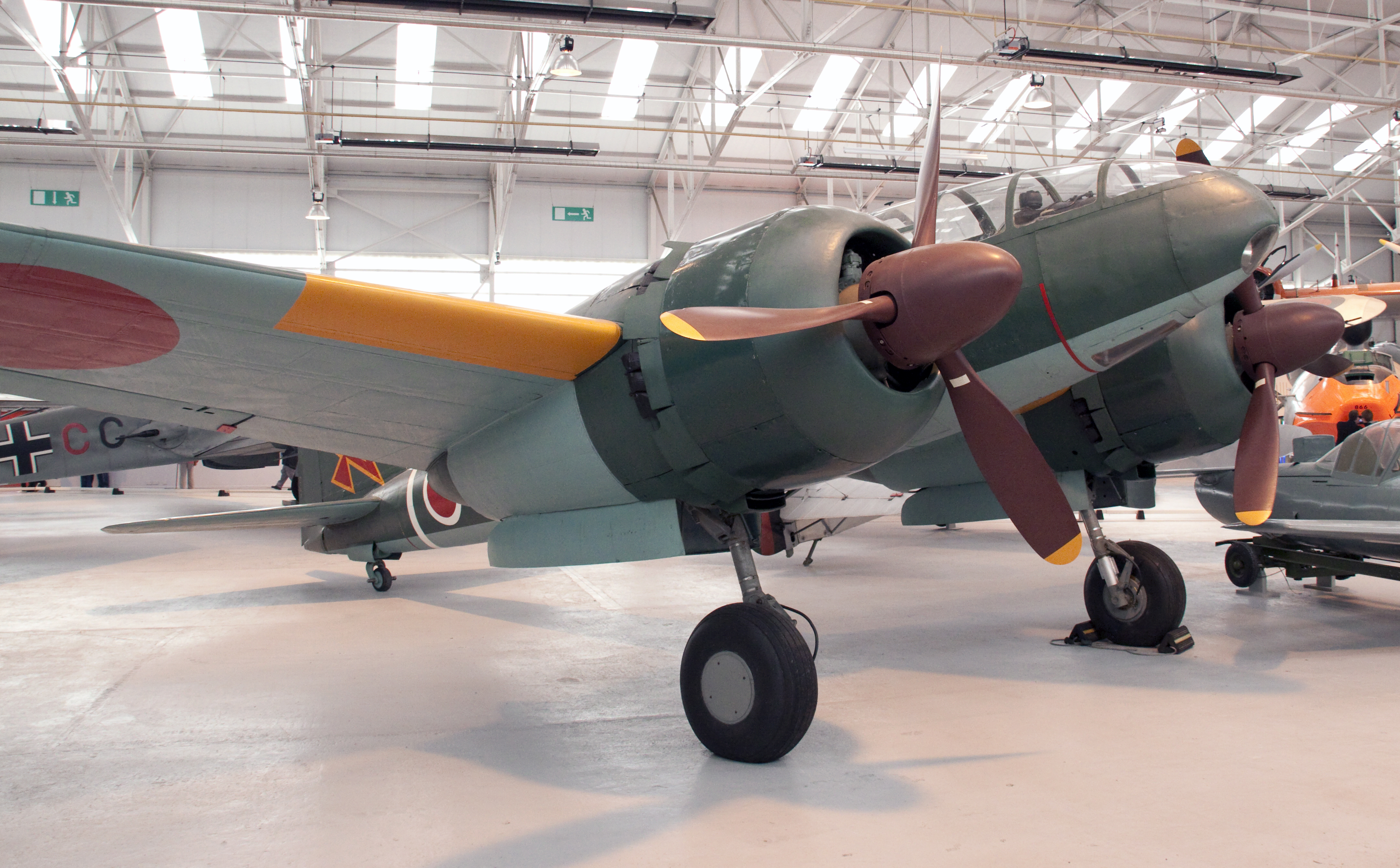
Mitsubishi Ki-46-III at the RAF Museum Cosford, 2009

The only complete survivor is a Ki-46-III Army Type 100 example, that is part of the collection of the Royal Air Force Museum in the United Kingdom. Built around 1943, it was part of the 81st Sentai, 3rd Chutai IJAAF. This unit had detachments deployed across the South West Pacific.

In late 1945, Japanese Surrendered Personnel at Kuruan Airfield in British Malaya were ordered to restore two Ki-46's at the base to airworthy condition for the Allied Technical Air Intelligence Unit. They managed this with one aircraft, and it was flown to Seletar, Singapore by a Japanese pilot in early 1946. It made a number of flights with Japanese pilots and was selected for museum preservation. It was shipped to the United Kingdom in mid-1946.

It became part of the RAF St Athan collection of historic aircraft, before moving to the Royal Air Force Museum Cosford in 1989. Ownership was transferred from the Ministry of Defence to the RAF Museum in 1998 and the aircraft remained on display at Cosford until 2022, when it was moved to the RAF Museum Hendon.

Wreckage of a Ki-46-II, abandoned at Jacquinot Bay Airfield in New Britain, was recovered in 2003.

== Specifications (Ki-46-II) ==
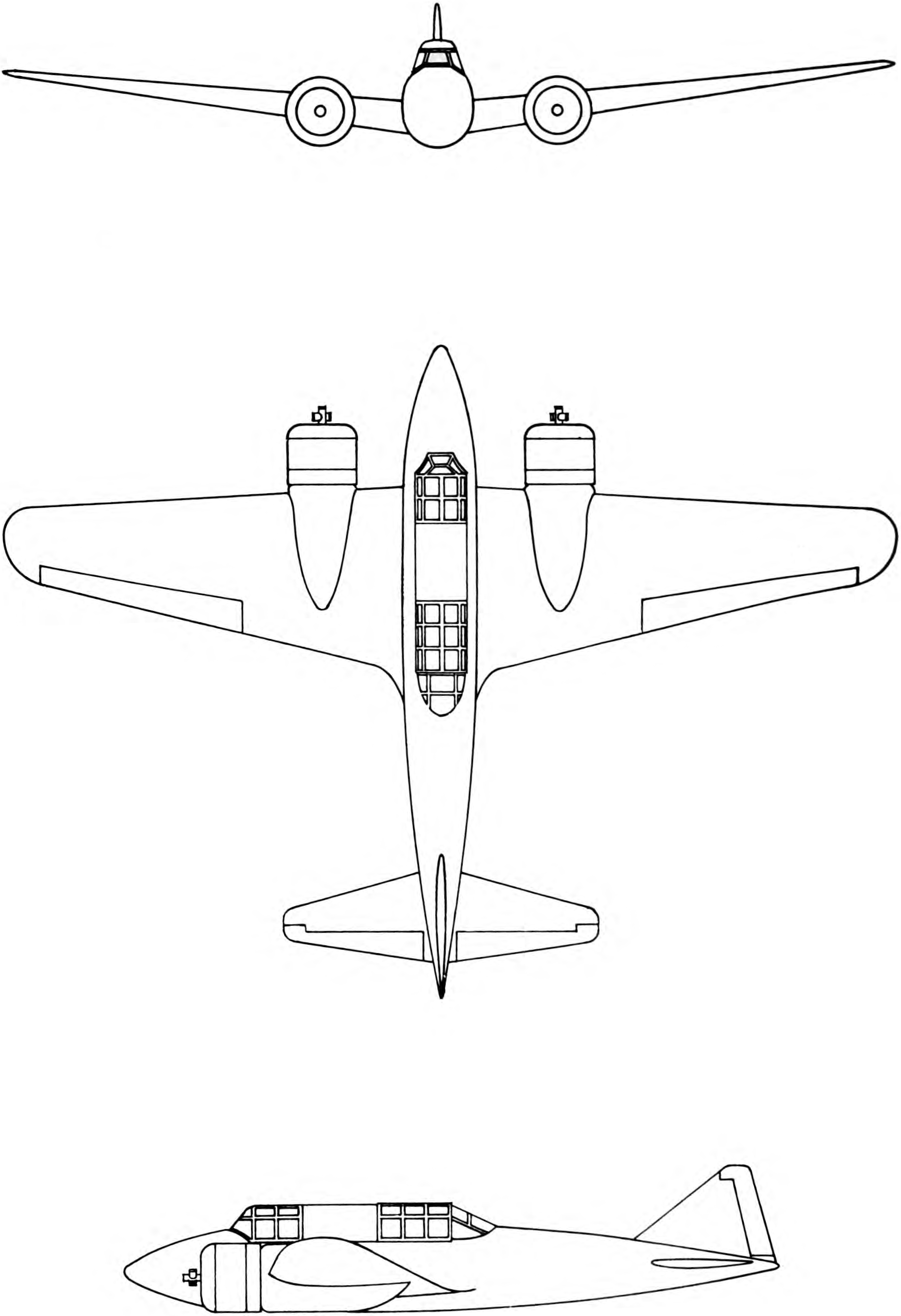
3-view drawing of the Mitsubishi Ki-46

Data from Japanese Aircraft of the Pacific War

General characteristics

- Crew: 2
- Length: 11 m (36 ft 1 in)
- Wingspan: 14.7 m (48 ft 3 in)
- Height: 3.88 m (12 ft 9 in)
- Wing area: 32 m^{2} (340 sq ft)
- Empty weight: 3,263 kg (7,194 lb)
- Gross weight: 5,050 kg (11,133 lb)
- Max takeoff weight: 5,800 kg (12,787 lb)
- Powerplant: 2 × Mitsubishi Ha-102 (Army Type 100 1,050hp Air Cooled Radial) 14-cylinder air-cooled radial piston engines, 810 kW (1,080 hp) each for take-off

787 kW (1,055 hp) at 2,800 m (9,200 ft)

- Propellers: 3-bladed constant-speed metal propellers

Performance

- Maximum speed: 604 km/h (375 mph, 326 kn) at 5,800 m (19,000 ft)
- Cruise speed: 400 km/h (250 mph, 220 kn) at 4,000 m (13,000 ft)
- Range: 2,474 km (1,537 mi, 1,336 nmi)
- Service ceiling: 10,720 m (35,170 ft)
- Time to altitude: 8,000 m (26,000 ft) in 17 minutes 58 seconds

Armament

- Guns: 1× 7.7 mm (0.303 in) Type 89 machine gun flexibly mounted in the rear cockpit (not fitted to all models)

== See also ==
Aircraft of comparable role, configuration, and era

- Nakajima C6N Saiun, the single-engine IJN equivalent, fastest Japanese carrier-based aircraft of the war
- de Havilland Mosquito
- Douglas P-70/F-3 Havoc
- Junkers Ju 88
- Kawasaki Ki-45
- Lockheed P-38
- Messerschmitt Me 410 Hornisse
- Nakajima J1N Gekko
- Petlyakov Pe-3
- Tachikawa Ki-70
- Tupolev Tu-2

Related lists

- List of aircraft of World War II

== Bibliography ==
- Ferkl, Martin (2005), Mitsubishi Ki-46 Dinah, Ostrava-Poruba, Czech Republic: Revi Publications, ISBN 9-788085-957112, No. II-4002
- Francillon, Réne J. (1966), The Mitsubishi Ki-46 (2nd ed.), Leatherhead: Profile Publications
- Francillon, René J. (1970), Japanese Aircraft of the Pacific War, London: Putnam, ISBN 0-370-00033-1
- Francillon, René J. (1979), Japanese Aircraft of the Pacific War (2nd ed.), London: Putnam & Company, ISBN 0-370-30251-6.
- Green, William (1973) [1961], Warplanes of the Second World War, Volume Three: Fighters, London: Macdonald & Co. (Publishers), ISBN 0-356-01447-9.
- Gunston, Bill (1978), The Illustrated Encyclopedia of Combat Aircraft of World War II, London: Salamander Books, ISBN 0-89673-000-X
- Millot, Bernard (February 1977). "Mitsubishi Type 100 Ki.46 Shin Shitei "Dinah" (1)". Le Fana de l'Aviation (in French) (87): 22–27. ISSN 0757-4169.
- "Mitsubishi Ki. 46...the Aesthetic Asiatic". Air International. Vol. 19, no. 6. November 1980. pp. 227–233. ISSN 0306-5634.
- Soumille, Jean-Claude (September 1999). "Les avions japonais aux coleurs françaises" [Japanese Aircraft in French Colors]. Avions: Toute l'Aéronautique et Son Histoire (in French) (78): 6–17. ISSN 1243-8650.
