= Zirkus Rosarius =

Luftwaffe aircraft testing unit

Zirkus Rosarius (also known as the Wanderzirkus Rosarius) was an Erprobungskommando-style special test unit of the Luftwaffe, specifically of the Luftwaffe High Command, tasked with testing captured British and American aircraft, all of which were repainted in German markings.

== History and mission ==
The unit was formed by Theodor Rosarius in 1943 and was part of the 2.Staffel/Versuchsverband Oberbefehlshaber der Luftwaffe (second squadron of the Experimental Unit of Luftwaffe High Command).

The purpose of testing allied aircraft was to discover any strengths or vulnerabilities in their design or performance. This information was highly useful in enabling German service personnel to develop tactics designed to counter strengths and exploit any vulnerabilities.

The Zirkus also toured operational airfields showing Luftwaffe pilots the captured aircraft and training them in techniques to counter these aircraft. The Zirkus Rosarius seemed to have merited the use of its own Geschwaderkennung ("wing code") of "T9", with a few of the unit's aircraft coming from KG 200, which already used the "A3" identification code of that wing.

== See also ==
- Air Fighting Development Unit, the RAF unit that tested captured German aircraft.
- No. 1426 (Enemy Aircraft) Flight, the RAF unit that flew captured German aircraft.
- Allied Technical Air Intelligence Unit, the combined Allied unit that evaluated Japanese aircraft.
- Kampfgeschwader 200 German special operations unit that operationally flew captured Allied aircraft.
