= Tachikawa Ki-70 =

Japanese reconnaissance aircraft prototype

Ki-70

General information
- Type: Reconnaissance
- National origin: Japan
- Manufacturer: Tachikawa Aircraft Company
- Status: Prototype
- Number built: 3

History
- First flight: 1943

The Tachikawa Ki-70 Clara was a high speed, photo reconnaissance aircraft that was tested for the Imperial Japanese Army Air Service in prototype form but never entered production. The Ki-70 was the intended successor to the Mitsubishi Ki-46 but was difficult to handle and was slower than the Mitsubishi Ki-46. The Ki-70 was first flown in 1943 but was found unsatisfactory and the program was terminated. Three aircraft were built.

== Description ==
Using the familiar layout of aircraft, such as the Mitsubishi G3M bomber and its planned predecessor the Mitsubishi Ki-46, the Ki-70 had a twin tail and narrow fuselage, an extensively glazed nose, and second cockpit facing aft for the gunner.

== History ==
In later years, the Ki-70 was used to disprove supposed photographic evidence concerning Amelia Earhart's supposed capture by the Japanese before World War II.

== Specifications (Ha-104M engine) ==
(Performance estimated)

Data from Japanese Aircraft of the Pacific War

General characteristics

- Crew: 3
- Length: 14.5 m (47 ft 7 in)
- Wingspan: 17.8 m (58 ft 5 in)
- Height: 3.46 m (11 ft 4 in)
- Wing area: 43 m^{2} (460 sq ft)
- Empty weight: 5,895 kg (12,996 lb)
- Gross weight: 9,855 kg (21,727 lb)
- Max takeoff weight: 10,700 kg (23,589 lb)
- Powerplant: 2 × Mitsubishi Ha-104M (Army Type 4 1,900hp Air Cooled Radial) 18-cylinder air-cooled radial piston engine, 1,400 kW (1,900 hp) each for take-off

1,350 kW (1,810 hp) at 2,200 m (7,200 ft)
1,201 kW (1,610 hp) at 6,100 m (20,000 ft)

- Propellers: 4-bladed constant-speed metal propellers

Performance

- Maximum speed: 647 km/h (402 mph, 349 kn) at 5,400 m (17,700 ft)
- Cruise speed: 490 km/h (300 mph, 260 kn) at 5,400 m (17,700 ft)
- Range: 2,480 km (1,540 mi, 1,340 nmi)
- Service ceiling: 11,000 m (36,000 ft)
- Time to altitude: 5,000 m (16,000 ft) in five minutes
- Wing loading: 229.2 kg/m^{2} (46.9 lb/sq ft)
- Power/mass: 0.288 kW/kg (0.175 hp/lb)

Armament

- Guns: 1 x 12.7 mm (0.500 in) MG, 1 x 7.7 mm (0.303 in) MG

== See also ==
Aircraft of comparable role, configuration, and era

- Mitsubishi Ki-46
