= RAF Collyweston =

Former RAF station in Northamptonshire, England

RAF Collyweston No. 5 Training Depot
- Collyweston, Northamptonshire in England
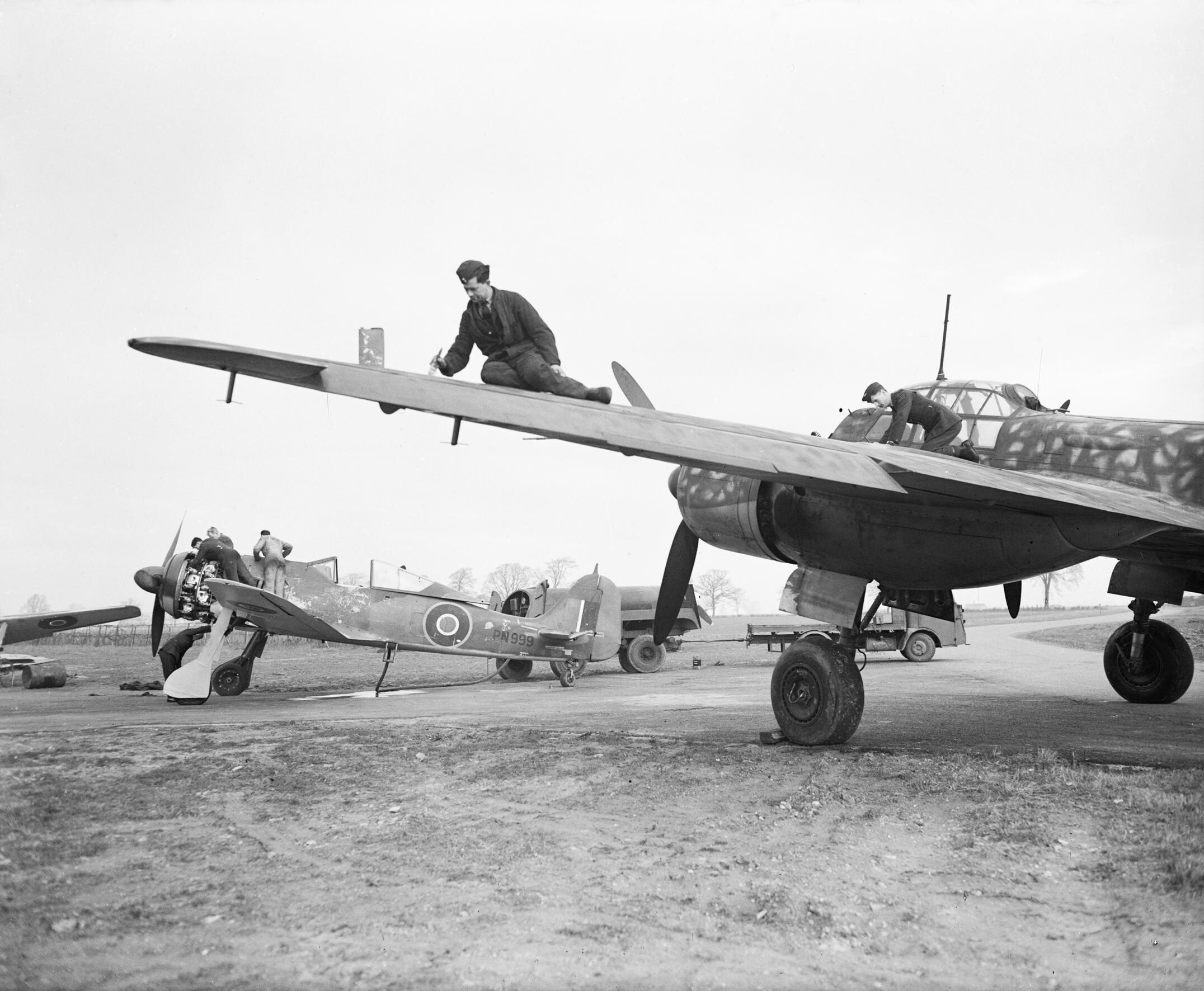
- Captured German Focke-Wulf Fw 190A-3 and Junkers Ju 88S-1 aircraft of 1426 Flight undergoing maintenance by RAF ground crew at Collyweston, February 1945

Site information
- Type: Royal Air Force satellite station
- Code: WI
- Owner: Air Ministry
- Operator: Royal Air Force
- Controlled by: RAF Fighter Command 1940–1945; *No. 12 Group RAF; RAF Flying Training Command 1945; *No. 21 Group RAF

Location
- Shown within Northamptonshire RAF Collyweston (the United Kingdom)
- Coordinates: 52°36′11″N 0°30′07″W

Site history
- Built: 1917; 1939/40
- In use: 1917; May 1940–1945
- Fate: returned to agriculture
- Battles/wars: First World War; European theatre of World War II

Airfield information
- Elevation: 86 metres (282 feet) AMSL
Runways
Direction	Length and surface
00/00	grass
00/00	grass
00/00	grass
00/00	grass

Royal Air Force Collyweston or more simply RAF Collyweston is a former Royal Air Force satellite station located 3.2 miles (5.1 kilometres) south-west of Stamford, Lincolnshire and 11 miles (18 kilometres) north east of Corby, Northamptonshire, England.

The airfield was a satellite station of RAF Wittering, and used by the No. 1426 Flight (Enemy Aircraft) Flight RAF during the Second World War.

== History ==
Founded in 1917 as No. 5 Training Depot Station, the station was renamed RAF Collyweston following formation of the Royal Air Force, via merger of the Royal Flying Corps (RFC) and the Royal Naval Air Service (RNAS) on 1 April 1918. The airfield was absorbed as a satellite station of RAF Wittering in 1939. A unit at Collyweston during the war was No. 1426 (Captured Enemy Aircraft) Flight, they flew and assessed enemy aircraft that crashed or forced landed.

In 1941, the runways of Wittering and Collyweston were joined to make one 2 miles (3.2 kilometres) long grass runway.

=== Units ===
The following units were based at Collyweston at some point:

- No. 23 Squadron RAF (1940)
- No. 133 Squadron RAF (1941)
- No. 152 Squadron RAF (1941–42 & 1942)
- No. 266 Squadron RAF (1940 & 1941)
- Detachment from No. 288 Squadron RAF (1943 & 1944 & 1945)
- No. 349 Squadron RAF (1943)
- No. 658 Squadron RAF (1944)

== Current status ==
Most of the former RAF Collyweston site has been returned to agricultural uses. No infrastructure remains of the former airfield, the exception being its remote 30 acre weapon storage area (WSA, or bomb dump), which is now used by a private company for secure logistics storage.
