= No. 1426 Flight RAF =

British air force unit dealing with captured enemy aircraft

No. 1426 Flight RAF No. 1426 (Photographic Reconnaissance) Flight
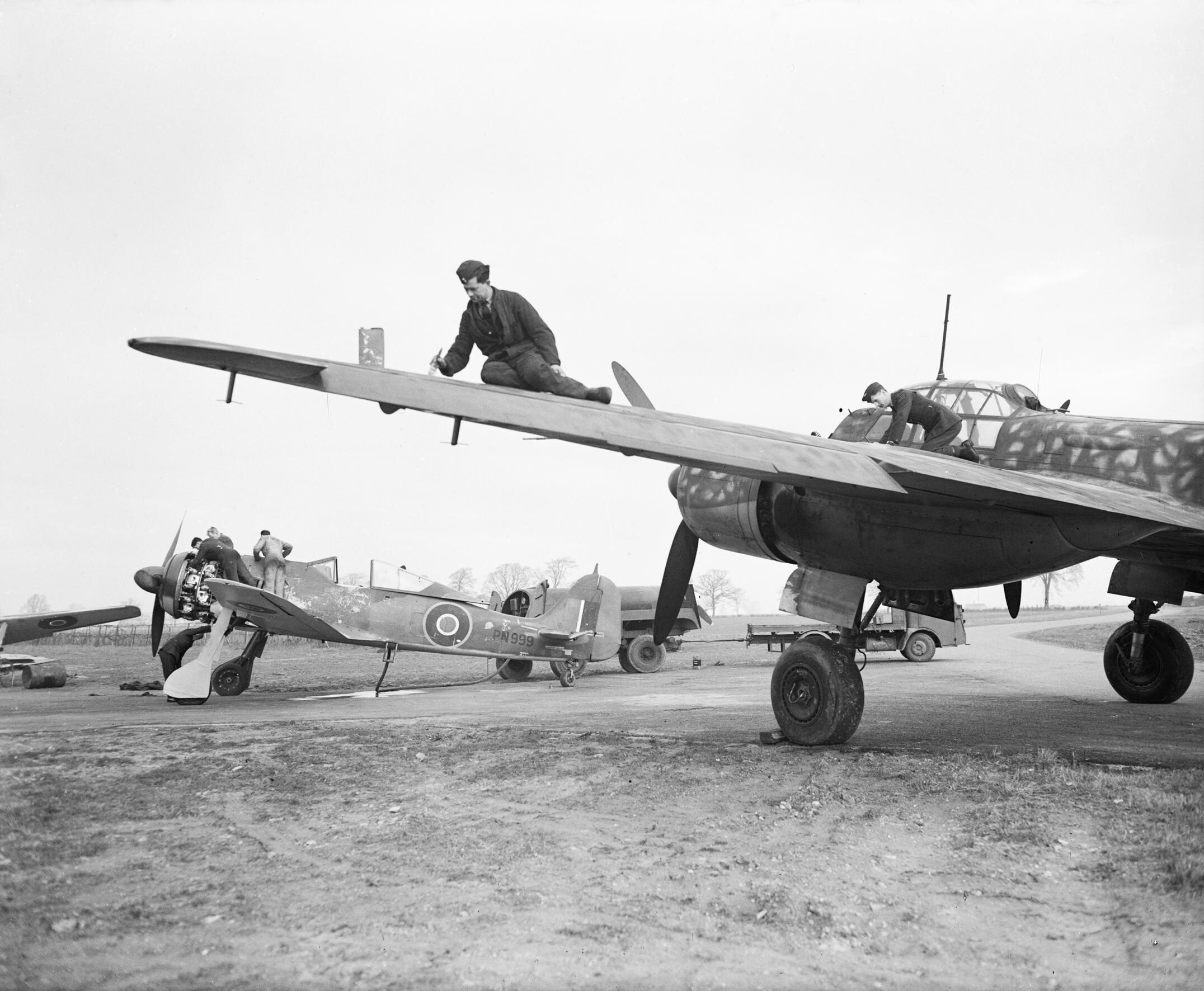
- A Focke-Wulf Fw 190 and a Junkers Ju 88 of 1426 Flight undergoing maintenance by RAF ground crew at RAF Collyweston (February 1945)
- Active: 21 November 1941 – 17 January 1945; 1 January 1956 – 31 December 1956
- Role: Enemy aircraft evaluation and demonstration
- Based: RAF Duxford; RAF Collyweston; RAF Khormaksar
- Equipment: Messerschmitt Bf 109; Messerschmitt Bf 110; Focke-Wulf Fw 190; Heinkel He 111; Junkers Ju 88; Henschel Hs 129; Avro Anson; Airspeed Oxford; General Aircraft Monospar ST-25; Avro Lincoln

No. 1426 (Enemy Aircraft) Flight RAF, nicknamed the Rafwaffe, was a Royal Air Force (RAF) independent aircraft flight formed during the Second World War to evaluate captured enemy aircraft and demonstrate their characteristics to other allied units. Several aircraft on charge with the Royal Aircraft Establishment (RAE) at Farnborough were also used by this unit. The RAE facilities at Farnborough were used for the flight testing of German and Italian aircraft during the war.

Many crash-landed aircraft were brought to Farnborough for examination, testing, and cannibalisation of spare parts to keep other aircraft in serviceable condition. The main flight testing work was carried out by the Aerodynamics Flight of the Experimental Flying Department and the Wireless & Electrical Flight (W&EF), the latter responsible for evaluation and examination of radar-equipped aircraft later in the war.

== History ==
=== No. 1426 (Enemy Aircraft) Flight ===
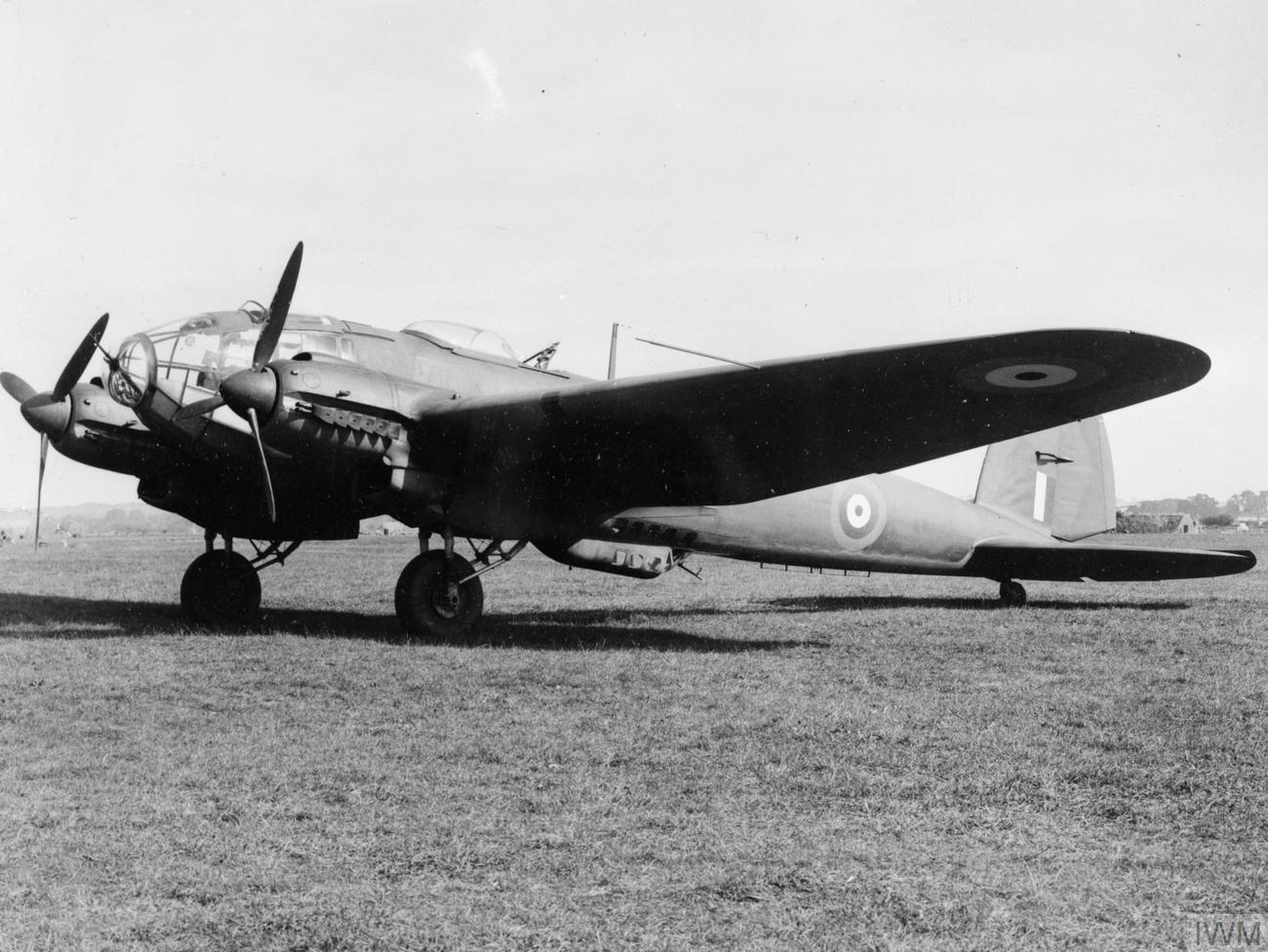
Heinkel He 111H, 'AW177' at RAF Duxford, prior to the establishment of 1426 Flight (Sept-Oct 1941).

The Royal Air Force unit was established on 21 November 1941 at RAF Duxford, made up of a small group of pilots who had previously been maintenance test pilots with No. 41 Group RAF. Attached at first to 12 Group, its mission was to demonstrate captured types to allied personnel and expose them to "the appearance, performance, and even the sound" of hostile types. Initially, it operated a Heinkel He 111H (RAF aircraft registration AW177) shot down in Scotland in February 1940, a Messerschmitt Bf 109 captured during the Battle of France (AE479) (handed over from the Air Fighting Development Unit, AFDU), and a Junkers Ju 88A-5 (HM509). The Ju 88 was a more recent British acquisition, after the pilot landed at night at RAF Chivenor in the belief it was an airfield in France; the crew had made a navigational error after being deceived by a Meacon. A General Aircraft Monospar was also assigned to the unit for general communication tasks and collecting spare parts.

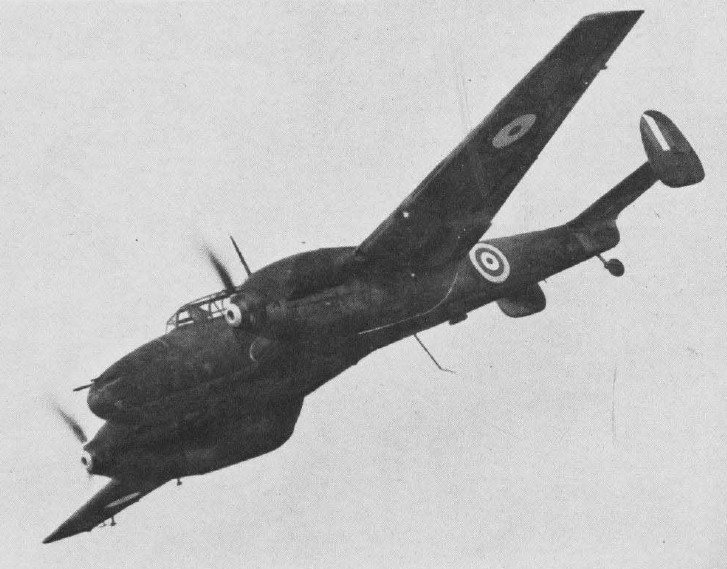
Messerschmitt Bf 110C-5 'AX772'.

The aircraft in the unit changed as later marques came into the RAF's hands in various ways; including capture by allied troops, forced or mistaken landings by German pilots, and defections. The flight cooperated with the RAF Film Unit, for which the usual British markings were removed and original German restored. Aircraft were then assigned to the AFDU at (RAF Duxford 1940-1943), where they were extensively tested before passing them on to the flight. Several aircraft were lost to crashes or damaged, and then cannibalised for spare parts. Others were shipped to America for further evaluation. In March 1943, the unit moved to RAF Collyweston in Northamptonshire. Beginning in early 1944, the flight made a round of U.S. Army Air Forces bases in Britain. After the invasion of Normandy, the perceived need for the flight declined.

The flight ceased operations at Collyweston on 17 January 1945, reforming at RAF Tangmere on the same date, with unit codes EA, as the 'Enemy Aircraft Flight' (EAF) of the Central Fighter Establishment (CFE), which finally disbanded 31 December 1945.

=== No. 1426 (Photographic Reconnaissance) Flight ===
Following disbandment of No. 7 Squadron RAF in December 1955, four crews and their aircraft were detached and sent to the Aden during the 'troubles', to carry out patrols as No. 1426 (Photographic Reconnaissance) Flight (1426 (PR) Flt) at RAF Khormaksar in Aden on 1 January 1956, and disbanded at Khormaksar on 31 December 1956, being the last time the Avro Lincoln flew operationally as a bomber.

== Aircraft operated, 1941–1945 ==
=== Axis aircraft ===
This list may be incomplete, and not all axis aircraft captured and allocated RAF aircraft registrations were flown by 1426 Flight. Others were flown by the Air Fighting Development Unit (AFDU) and the Royal Aircraft Establishment (RAE).

Messerschmitt Bf 109
model	Werk Nr.	German call-sign	RAF reg	circumstances of acquisition	fate
E-3	1304	White 1	AE479	Aircraft of 1./JG 76 flown by Fw. Karl Hier, captured by the French near Wœrth, 22 November 1939; handed over to the RAF 2 May 1940.	Sent to the US in April 1942; crashed at Wright Field 3 November 42.
E-4/B	4101	Black 12	DG200	Damaged by a Spitfire of 66 Sqn, flown by Canadian ace George Christie; belly–landed at RAF Manston, pilot Wolfgang Teumer (of JG 51) taken prisoner, 27 November 1940.	Repaired using parts of other aircraft and tested by Rolls-Royce. In February 1942, passed to Research and Development at Hatfield for propeller tests, then to the Aeroplane and Armament Experimental Establishment (A&AEE) at Boscombe Down, before in March 1942 to No. 1426 Flight. In 1943, retired from RAF use as more recent Bf 109 models had been acquired and selected for long term preservation as a museum aircraft. It was eventually moved to the Royal Air Force Museum, Hendon in 1978, where it is currently on display in the Battle of Britain Hall.
F–2	12764	<< +	ES906	Originally of I./JG 26, flown by Gruppenkommandeur Hpt. Rolf Pingel, it was damaged by return fire while attacking Short Stirling bombers and belly–landed near Dover, 10 July 1941.	Repaired by the RAE and evaluated by the AFDU in October 1941. Crashed near Fowlmere 20 October 1941 during test flight, killing Polish Air Force pilot F/O Marian J. Skalski.
F–4/B	7232	White 11	NN644	Originally flown by Uffz. Oswald Fischer of 10.(Jabo)/JG 26, was damaged by anti-aircraft fire during an attack on a Royal Navy corvette and belly–landed at Beachy Head, 20 May 1942	Flown until the end of the war.
G-2/Trop	10639	Black 6	RN228	Formerly of 8./JG 27; found abandoned and in damaged condition by No. 3 Squadron RAAF, at an airfield near Tobruk, Libya in November 1942.	Repaired by 3 Sqn using parts from other aircraft. Repainted in a Desert Air Force scheme, given the squadron code 'CV-V' and evaluated in North Africa. Transferred to 1426 Flight in late 1943. Preserved in the RAF Museum.
G-6/U2	412951	White 16	TP814	Lt. Horst Prenzel, Staffelkapitan 1./JG 301, landed at RAF Manston by mistake after a Wilde Sau sortie over the invasion area against night-bombers on 21 July 1944. Another Bf 109 also attempted to land but crashed.	Written–off in a take-off accident at RAF Wittering, 23 November 1944/
G-6(trop.)	????		VX101	Captured in the Middle East in 1943.	Written–off in a forced landing at Thorney Island 19 May 1944.

Focke-Wulf Fw 190
model	Werk Nr.	German call-sign	RAF reg	circumstances of acquisition	fate
A–3	135313		MP499	Oblt. Armin Faber, Gruppe Adjutant of III./JG 2 'Richthofen' became disorientated after shooting down an RAF Spitfire over Start Point, Devon. Attempting to return home, he accidentally flew north instead of south and landed at RAF Pembrey on 23 June 1942.	Struck off charge, 18 September 1943.
A-5/U8	2596	White 6	PN999	Originally of I./SKG 10, flown by Uffz. Werner Ohne; landed in error at RAF Manston, 20 June 1943.	Despatched to store at 47 MU Sealand in July 1946.
A-4/U8	7155		PE882	Originally H+ of II./SKG 10, flown by Uffz. Otto Bechtolder. Disorientated en-route and running short of fuel, he force-landed at RAF West Malling on 16 April 1943.	Crashed 13 October 1944, killing F/L E.R. Lewendon.
A-4/U8	5843	Red 9	PM679	Originally of 2./SKG 10, flown by Uffz. Heinz Ehrhardt, accidentally landed at RAF Manston, Kent on 20 May 1943.	Last flight was June 1944 when, shortly after takeoff, the aircraft suffered a major engine failure and force landed; was used for spares for PE882 and PN999.

Junkers Ju 88
model	Werk Nr.	German call-sign	RAF reg	circumstances of acquisition	fate
A-4		4D+DL	EE205	Formerly of 3./KG 30, landed by mistake at RAF Lulsgate Bottom, after a night raid on Birkenhead on 23/24 July 1941.	Appeared in the 1943 film The Adventures of Tartu.
A-5	6073	M2+MK	HM509	Originally of KuFlGr.106, accidentally landed at RAF Chivenor, 26 November 1941.	Damaged by a ground loop on landing on 19 May 1944; although repairable, it was cannibalised for spare parts.
G-1	712273	4R+UR	TP190	Night-fighter of III./NJG 2 flown by Obgfr. Maekle and equipped with FuG 220 'Lichtenstein' SN-2 radar and homing devices FuG 227 'Flensburg' and FuG 350 'Naxos'. Landed in error at RAF Woodbridge, Suffolk on 13 July 1944.	Scrapped, October 1945.
R-1	360043	D5+EV	PJ876	Lichtenstein BC radar-equipped night-fighter Junkers Ju 88 of 10./NJG 3 flown to RAF Dyce, Scotland by defecting crew, 9 May 1943.	Preserved in the RAF Museum.
S-1	140604	RF+MT	TS472	Captured at Villacoublay, near Paris, September 1944.	

other types
type and model	Werk Nr.	axis call-sign	RAF reg	circumstances of acquisition	fate
Messerschmitt Bf 110C–5	2177	5F-CM	AX772	Originally of 4.(F)/14 intercepted by RAF fighters while on a reconnaissance mission on 21 July 1940. Forced down near Goodwood Racecourse, Sussex.	Royal Aircraft Establishment repaired this aircraft. After handling trials, was flown to the Air Fighting Development Unit at Duxford in Oct 1941. Transferred to No. 1426 Flight in Mar 1942, until moving to the Enemy Aircraft Flight of the Central Flying School at Tangmere in January 1945. Stored at No. 47 Maintenance Unit (MU) Sealand in November 1945. Scrapped in 1947.
Fiat CR.42 Falco	MM5701	13-95	BT474	Made a forced–landing on the beach at Orford Ness due to engine failure, 11 November 1940.	Preserved in the RAF Museum.
Heinkel He 111 H-1	6853	1H+EN	AW177	Originally of II./KG 26. Landed in a field near North Berwick on 9 February 1940 after being damaged by a Spitfire.	Crashed at RAF Polebrook on 10 November 1943 while carrying a number of 1426 Flight ground crew as passengers. The pilot, F/O Barr, and six others were killed, four were injured.
Henschel Hs 129 B-1	0297		NF756	Of I./SG 2. Captured in North Africa.	Received by 1426 Flight in a dismantled state 7 July 1943. Struck off charge, August 1947.
Messerschmitt Me 410 A–3	10259	F6+OK	TF209	This aircraft was formerly of 2(F)/122, which landed intact and was captured at Monte Corvino, Italy; crew had become lost during a photo–reconnaissance mission in the Naples area.	Flown until 1946.

=== Support aircraft ===
Support aircraft operated by no. 1426 Flight RAF, data from

aircraft	RAF reg
Avro Anson Mk.I	N9882
Airspeed Oxford Mk.II	V3781
General Aircraft Monospar ST-25	K8308

== Aircraft operated, 1956 ==
Avro Lincoln B.1

== Survivors ==
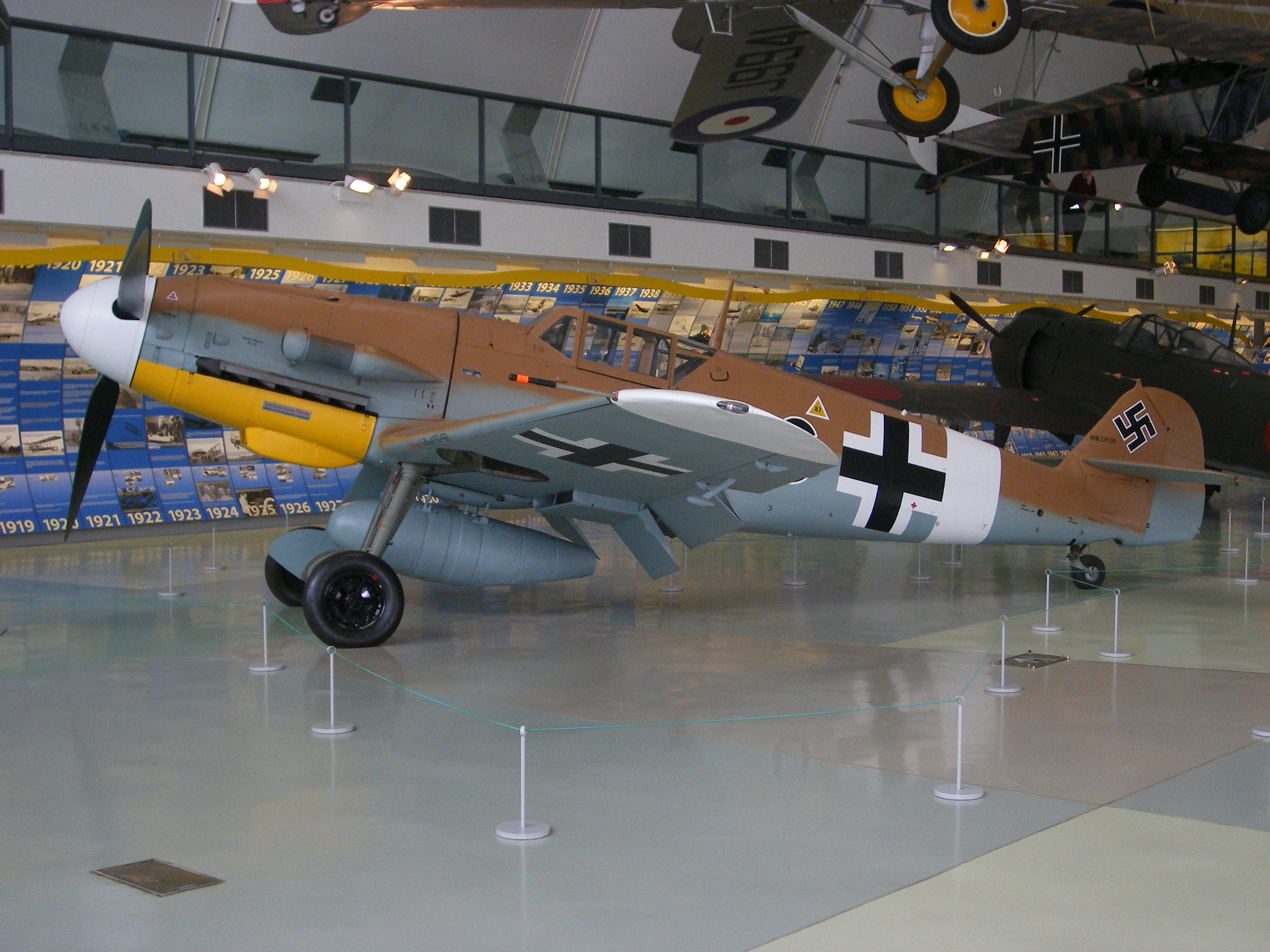
Former 1426 Flight aircraft, Bf 109 G2 RN228 at the RAF Museum, 2007.

Four of the aircraft operated by the flight still survive: Bf 109 E-3 'DG200', Bf 109 G2 'RN228' (known as 'Black 6'), Fiat CR42 'BT474', and Ju 88R-1 'PJ876'. All are currently displayed at the Royal Air Force Museum London.

== See also ==
- Kampfgeschwader 200
- Zirkus Rosarius, the Luftwaffe unit that test-flew captured Allied aircraft.
- Allied Technical Air Intelligence Unit, the Allied unit that evaluated Japanese aircraft
- Eric "Winkle" Brown, from the Fleet Air Arm of the Royal Navy, the Commander of No. 1426 Flight, who flew most of the aircraft captured, and who holds the world record for having flown the greatest number of distinct aircraft types.
- Roland Falk
- List of Royal Air Force aircraft squadrons
- List of RAF Regiment units
- List of Fleet Air Arm aircraft squadrons
- List of Army Air Corps aircraft units
- List of Royal Air Force aircraft independent flights
- List of RAF Squadron Codes
