= Air Fighting Development Unit RAF =

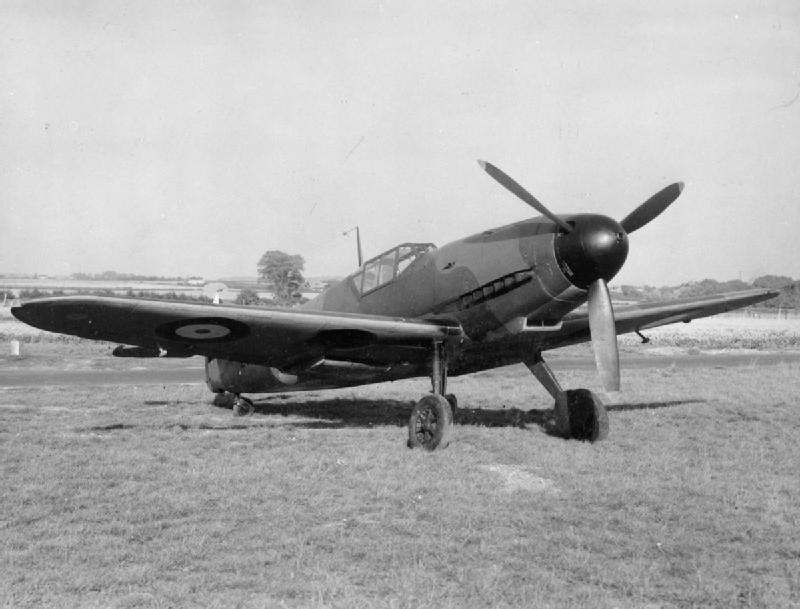
One of the aircraft operated by the AFDU – a captured, German Messerschmitt Bf 109 at RAF Duxford (October 1941)

The Air Fighting Development Unit (AFDU) was an air technical intelligence part of the Royal Air Force which developed tactics and tested captured enemy aircraft. It was based at Royal Air Force Stations Northolt, Duxford and Wittering.

The AFDU was under the control of RAF Fighter Command and the Air Ministry; the AFDU performed comparative trials, developed and promulgated tactics effective against opposing aircraft types. Also sharing Wittering with the AFDU was the Naval Air Fighting Development Unit. These units also carried out tests and evaluations on a wide range of fighter aircraft, aircraft modifications and new equipment prior to entering Allied service.

The AFDU was formed as the Air Fighting Development Establishment at Northolt on 20 October 1934; being re-named the Air Fighting Development Unit in July 1940. The units were absorbed into the Central Fighter Establishment and moved to RAF Tangmere in 1945.

== Operation Banquet ==
Under the Operation Banquet anti-invasion plans, the AFDU was allocated the title No. 550 Squadron RAF.

== Air Fighting Development Squadron ==
The AFDU was reconstituted in the 1950s at RAF Tangmere as the Air Fighting Development Squadron (AFDS), subsequently relocating to RAF Coltishall where it operated the BAC Lightning jet fighter in its P.1B, F.1 and F.1A variants. The AFDS moved to RAF Binbrook in October 1962, operating the F.2 and T.4 variants until the squadron was absorbed by the Central Fighter Establishment (CFE).

== See also ==
- No. 1426 Flight RAF – also known as the "Rafwaffe"
