= Herbert Schmid =

German World War II pilot

Oberleutnant Herbert Schmid (1 April 1914 – 1975) was a German World War II pilot who defected to north-east Scotland in May 1943, piloting a German nightfighter with advanced interception radar which allowed British scientists to jam German nightfighter radar.

== Early life ==
He was born in Sachsen-Anhalt. His father was the secretary to the German Chancellor and Foreign Minister, Gustav Stresemann

In 1974 the West German newspaper Bild am Sonntag ran a story about Herbert Schmid, written by Günther Stiller, claiming that he was a British agent, who had flown a Dornier Do 217 into a Lincolnshire RAF airfield on the night of 20 May 1941.

== Career ==
He was a pilot in the Luftwaffe, serving with Nachtjagdgeschwader 3 (NJG 3).

== May 1943 defection to Scotland ==
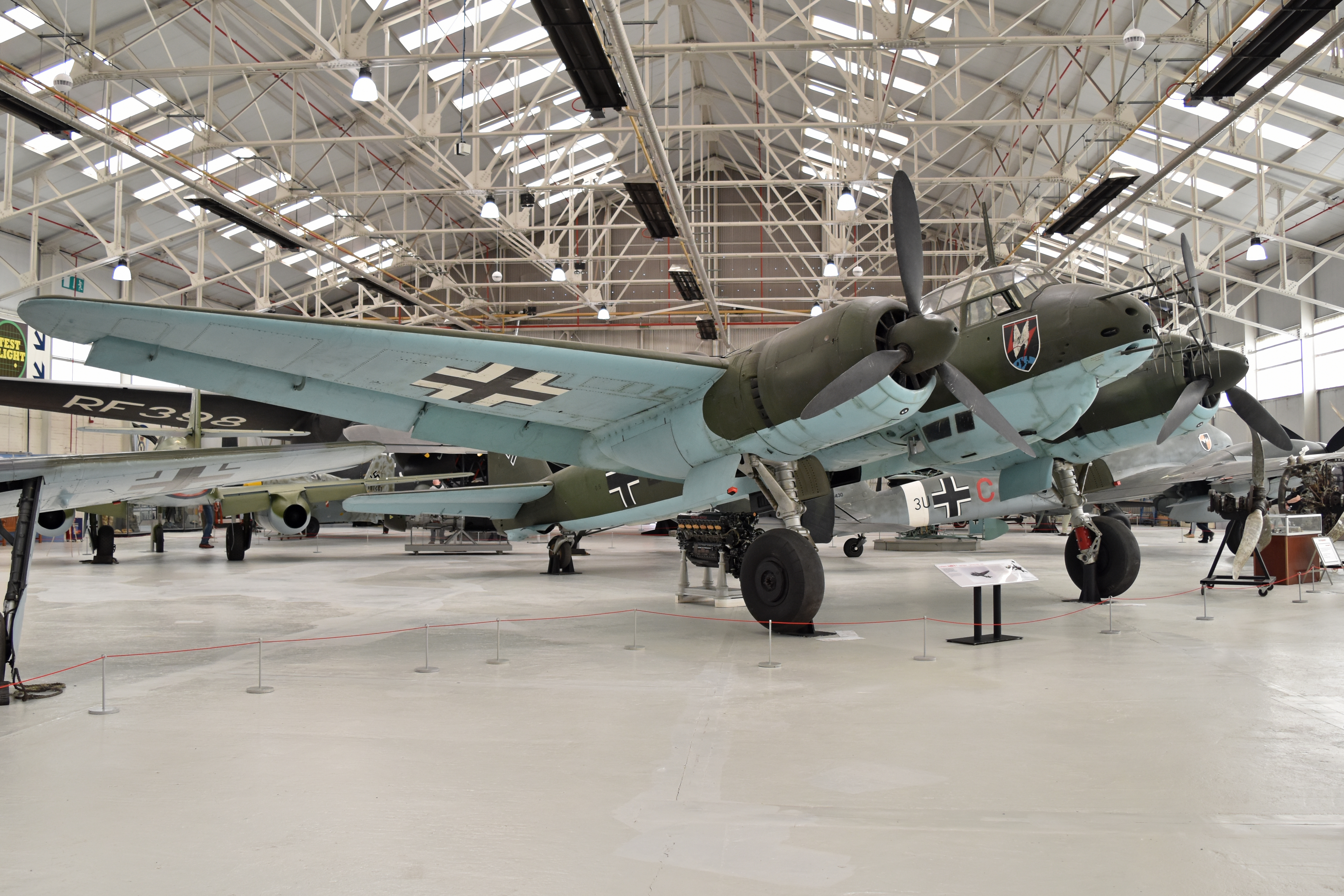
His Junkers Ju 88 360043, seen in June 2018, was at the RAF Museum in London from 22 November 1978, in the Battle of Britain Hall when it opened, until 2017; it is one of only two surviving intact Ju 88s, and has been at Royal Air Force Museum Cosford since February 2017

On Sunday 9 May 1943, at age 29, Schmid flew his Junkers Ju 88 R-1 (360043), equipped with the most advanced German nightfighter interception radar, to an RAF station at Aberdeen. He had set off from Aalborg in Denmark at 1503, flying to Norway to refuel at 1603. It took off at 1650 to take part in a mission over the Skagerrak, between Norway and Denmark. At 1710, a false message was sent to the German nightfighter headquarters in Denmark, saying that the aircraft's starboard engine was on fire; the aircraft dropped down to sea level and dropped three life rafts.

=== Interception ===
Two Spitfires from 165 Squadron, with an American (in BM 515T) and Canadian pilot (in AB 921), were sent to intercept the Ju 88, making contact with the Ju 88 at 1805, west of Aberdeen; the Ju 88 dropped its flaps and undercarriage and launched red flares. The Ju 88 landed at Aberdeen at 1820. One German aircrew, Oberfeldwebel Erich Kantwill, was not compliant following the landing and had to be taken at gunpoint.

A WAAF photographer noticed how 'full of smug confidence' that the two German pilots seemed, with one of the pilots 'leisurely combing his hair', not like a typical prisoner-of-war would do so.

The Station Commander was Group Captain J W Colquhoun.

Schmid was detained as a prisoner of war, after being detained in the Officer's Mess for one day with the other crew of his aircraft. On 10 May, the three Luftwaffe aircrew, in civilian clothes, were given an RAF Regiment escort to Aberdeen railway station. On the train they were accompanied by staff of MI6.

Prof RV Jones caught the night train from London, arriving on the morning of Tuesday 11 May. He inspected the aircraft with fellow physicist Derek Jackson.

=== Aircraft testing ===
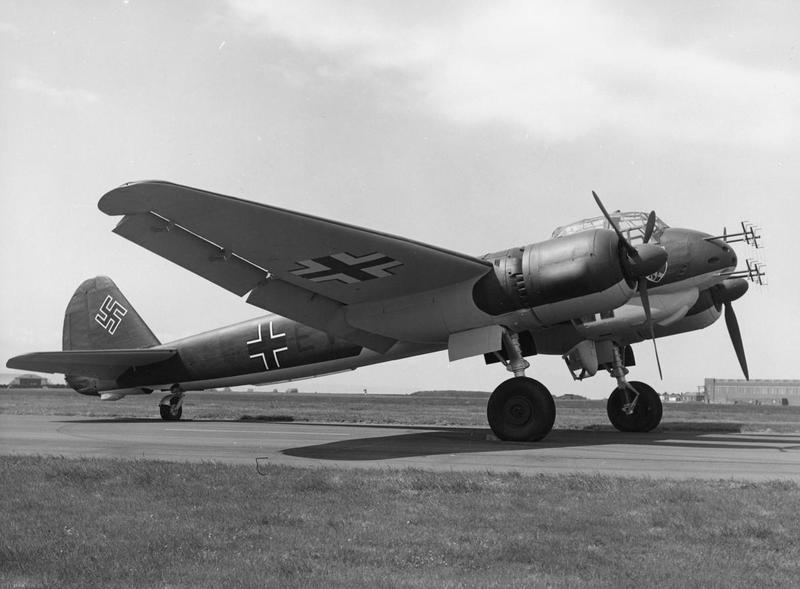
The aircraft when being tested

Once the aircraft was captured, German nightfighters could be detected much earlier. The aircraft was flown many times, behind a Vickers Wellington that dropped the tin foil window. The radar-jamming technique known as window was found to work. The previous year, Wellington DV819 of No. 1474 Flight (part of 192 Squadron) had attempted the world's first Ferret mission, from RAF Gransden Lodge in Huntingdonshire on 3 December 1942, to find German AI radar; the aircraft came under attack by a Luftwaffe Ju 88 nightfighter, and shot down on the Kent coast; the captured Ju 88 would find the radar system that this Wellington had been trying to find in December 1942.

== History of Aberdeen ==
On Tuesday 17 January 1950, Prof RV Jones revisited Aberdeen, to give a talk about the incident, at the University of Aberdeen, to the Tarves Literary Society. He said that the 1943 incident was his first visit to the city. He also mentioned that the Soviets had taken an interest in radar from 1935, but had not progressed. Some Soviet laboratories looked at the possibilities, and one laboratory had got further than the others. In 1938 the OGPU (Joint State Political Directorate, the fore-runner of the NKVD) arrived at the radar laboratory, interviewed staff, became suspicious, leading to deportation of some of the scientists, as the OGPU believed that the scientists were 'English spies'. Prof RV Jones said, at the meeting in Aberdeen, that this action by the Soviets had 'wrecked their own radar research'. Another important British physicist was Sir Robert Cockburn.

Prof RV Jones was the person who had been the first to convince the British government that German scientists had developed radar, mostly thanks to the Oslo Report, passed to the British Embassy in Oslo in Norway by its author, the physicist Hans Ferdinand Mayer, on 4 November 1939. The Germans would know nothing of this report, until the end of the war. On 23 February 1941 Air Marshal Philip Joubert de la Ferté arranged a meeting to discuss whether the Germans had any radar, and Prof RV Jones showed him a picture of the Freya radar, taken the day before, at Auderville in France; the Germans had also — foolishly — named the radar system after the Norse goddess Freyja; given that the Norse goddess in question was known for her magical power to see over a hundred miles, British scientists did not need a surfeit of guesses to deduce the likely function of the German system.

In July 1942 a German-speaking British Y service radio operator, broadcasting from a radio transmitter at Wrotham in Kent, and intercepting Luftwaffe nightfighter radio transmissions, heard mention of the unknown Emil-Emil system. British scientists deduced that this new system was an aircraft interception radar, operating at 490 MHz. (Emil-Emil turned out to be a code name for the Lichtenstein radar system). On 26 April 1943, the Ground Grocer radio transmitter at RAF Dunwich, on the Suffolk coast, began jamming the Emil-Emil wavelengths.

== Military outcome ==
The Serrate radar detector, for British nightfighters, resulted from the understanding of the Ju-88's 50-cm radar. Serrate was first deployed on 14 June 1943. Five nightfighters had Serrate detectors, resulting in the loss of one Luftwaffe aircraft.

Later the technology was deployed on Mosquito nightfighters of 141 Sqn, 239 Sqn at RAF West Raynham, and 169 Sqn at RAF Great Massingham in the west of Norfolk.

Erich Kantwill returned to his wife Anneliese in Dortmund, and his daughter. Schmid returned to Bonn.

== Aircraft ==
Within five days the Ju 88 had been given the designation PJ876, later being tested at RAF Collyweston in Northamptonshire.

In the 1960s the aircraft was at RAF Biggin Hill, then in storage at RAF Henlow, then moved to Wales in August 1973, to be restored by a team led by Flt Lt Ken Hurst.

In early 1975 the aircraft was restored to original condition at RAF St Athan in south Wales.

The aircraft was moved to the RAF Museum in London in November 1978, when the museum opened.

== See also ==
- Battle of Graveney Marsh, September 1940
- 23 June 1942, a Fw 190 A3 accidentally landed, with Oberleutnant Armin Faber at RAF Pembrey, now Pembrey Sands Air Weapons Range; it was the first time that the RAF had such an aircraft; the pilot mistook the Bristol Channel for the English Channel; he came from Jagdgeschwader 2 at Morlaix; he was confronted by Sgt Matthews, with a flare; he was taken to RAF Fairwood Common by Group Captain David Atcherley; the aircraft is in Shoreham Aircraft Museum
- 16 April 1943, in the early hours; twelve Focke-Wulf Fw 190 A4 Luftwaffe aircraft had followed RAF bombers home from Germany to Essex; four of the Fw 190 aircraft had crossed the Thames estuary and believing it was the English Channel, the aircraft mistakenly landed at RAF West Malling; one crashed with the pilot killed, but the other three pilots were captured, with Feldwebel Otto Bechtold from Schnellkampfgeschwader 10
- 13 July 1944, a landing at RAF Woodbridge in Suffolk of a Nachtjagdgeschwader 2 (NJG 2) Ju 88G, also carrying advanced radar, piloted by Unteroffizier Hans Mackle, Obergefreiter Heinz Olze and Obergefreiter Hans Mockle
- 21 July 1944, at around 0300, two Messerschmitt Bf 109 (G) aircraft landed at RAF Manston in Kent, piloted by Leutnant Horst Prenzel and Feldwebel Manfred Gromill of Jagdgeschwader 301 (JG 301)
- Helmuth Pohle, led the first German aerial attack on the UK, in Scotland, on 16 October 1939 in a Ju 88, later taken prisoner-of-war
