= Armin Faber =

German World War II fighter pilot

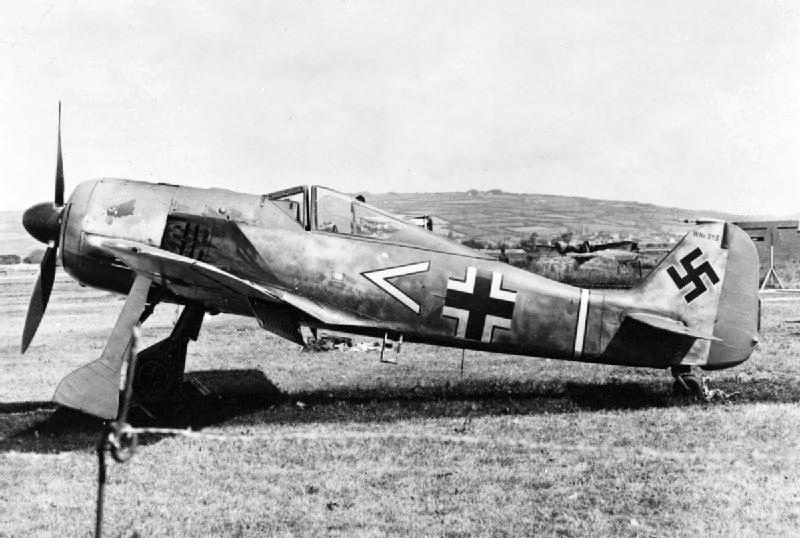
- Faber's Focke-Wulf Fw 190A-3 of III/JG 2 at RAF Pembrey, June 1942
- Military career
- Allegiance: Nazi Germany
- Branch: Luftwaffe
- Service years: 1940–1942
- Rank: Oberleutnant (Wehrmacht)
- Unit: Jagdgeschwader 2
- Conflicts: World War II

Oberleutnant Armin Faber was a German Luftwaffe pilot in World War II who mistook the Bristol Channel for the English Channel and landed his Focke-Wulf Fw 190 (Fw 190) intact at RAF Pembrey in South Wales. His plane was the first Fw 190 to be captured by the Allies and was tested to reveal any weaknesses that could be exploited.

== 23 June 1942 ==
Location Map

In June 1942, Oberleutnant Armin Faber was Gruppen-Adjutant (performing administrative and personnel paperwork duties as well as flight duties) to the commander of the III fighter Gruppe of Jagdgeschwader 2 (JG 2, Second Fighter Wing) based in Morlaix in Brittany. On 23 June, he was given special permission to fly a combat mission with 7th Staffel; a unit that flew Focke-Wulf Fw 190 fighters.

The Fw 190 had only recently arrived with front line units at this time and its superior performance had caused the Allies so many problems that they were considering mounting a commando raid on a French airfield to capture one for evaluation.

7th Staffel was scrambled to intercept a force of six Boston light bombers returning from a bombing mission; the Bostons were escorted by three Czechoslovak-manned RAF squadrons, 310 Squadron, 312 Squadron and 313 Squadron commanded by Alois Vašátko. All the Bostons returned safely while a fight developed over the English Channel with the escorting Spitfires, which resulted in the loss of two Fw 190s and seven Spitfires, including that of Alois Vašátko, who was killed when he collided with an Fw 190 (the German pilot bailed out and was captured).

During the combat, Faber became disoriented and separated from the other German aircraft. He was attacked by Sergeant František Trejtnar of 310 Squadron. In his efforts to shake off the Spitfire, Faber flew north over Exeter in Devon. After much high-speed manoeuvring, Faber, with only one cannon working, pulled an Immelmann turn into the sun and shot down his pursuer in a head-on attack.

Trejtnar bailed out safely, although he had a shrapnel wound in his arm and sustained a broken leg on landing; his Spitfire crashed near the village of Black Dog, Devon. Meanwhile, the disoriented Faber now mistook the Bristol Channel for the English Channel and flew north instead of south. Thinking South Wales was France, he turned towards the nearest airfield – RAF Pembrey. Observers on the ground could not believe their eyes as Faber waggled his wings in a victory celebration, lowered the Focke-Wulf's undercarriage and landed.

The Pembrey duty pilot, Sergeant Jeffreys, identified the aircraft as German while it was landing and he ordered his men to signal it to park in the dispersal area. As the Fw 190 slowed, he jumped onto its wing and took Faber prisoner with a flare gun; as Pembrey was a training station, Jeffreys had no other weapon to hand. Faber was "so despondent that he attempted suicide" unsuccessfully.

Faber was later driven to RAF Fairwood Common for interrogation under the escort of Group Captain David Atcherley. Atcherley, fearful of an escape attempt, aimed his revolver at Faber for the entire journey. At one point the car hit a pothole, causing the weapon to fire; the shot only narrowly missed Faber.

As a prisoner of war, Faber was sent to Canada where he attempted to escape from the prisoner camp. He was repatriated just before the end of the war due to ill health.

== Focke-Wulf Fw 190A-3 ==
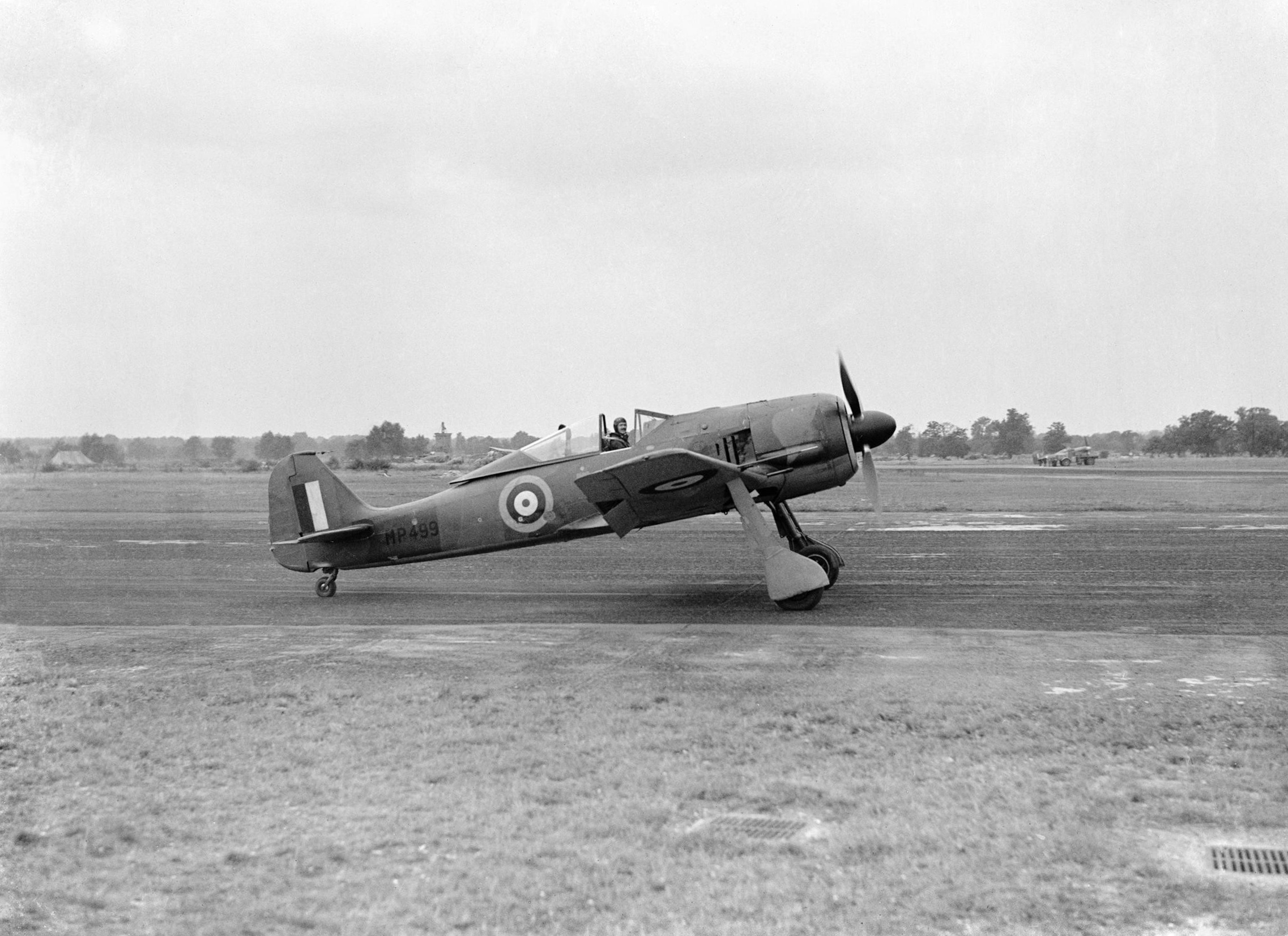
Faber's captured Focke Wulf Fw 190A-3 at the Royal Aircraft Establishment, Farnborough, with the RAE's chief test pilot, Wing Commander H. J. "Willie" Wilson at the controls, August 1942

Faber's plane was a Fw 190A-3 with the Werknummer 313. It was the only Fw 190 fighter to be captured intact by the Allies during the war. All other captured Fw 190s were either of the long-range bomber or fighter-bomber types.

Group Captain Hugh Wilson, the pilot mainly responsible for test flying captured enemy aircraft, was asked to fly 313 from RAF Pembrey to RAF Farnborough under the guarantee not to crash. This was an impossible guarantee to give, so the aircraft was dismantled and transported via lorry instead.

At Farnborough, the Fw 190 was repainted in RAF colours and given the RAF serial number MP499 and a 'P' for prototype. Testing and evaluation commenced on 3 July 1942 at the Royal Aircraft Establishment (RAE) at RAF Farnborough. Roughly nine flying hours were recorded, providing the Allies with extremely valuable intelligence.

After ten days it was transferred to the Air Fighting Development Unit at RAF Duxford for tactical assessment, where it was flown in mock combat trials against the new Spitfire Mk.IX, providing the RAF with methods to best fight the Fw 190A with their new fighter. The Fw 190 was then transferred to No. 1426 (Enemy Aircraft) Flight. The Fw 190 was flown 29 times between 3 July 1942 and 29 January 1943. It was then partially dismantled and tests were carried out on its engine's performance at Farnborough. It was struck off charge on 18 September 1943 and scrapped.

== Surviving relics ==
The Shoreham Aircraft Museum displays the armoured-glass windscreen of Faber's Fw 190, together with part of its control panel. The museum also holds some wreckage fragments of František Trejtnar's Spitfire. In 1991, Armin Faber visited the museum and presented it with his officer's dagger and pilot's badge. The quick release buckle of the parachute František Trejtnar used that day is owned by an aviation-themed cafe at The Moravian Museum in Brno, in the Czech Republic.

== See also ==
- Herbert Schmid, deliberately landed a Junkers Ju 88 in May 1943 in Scotland
