= Battle of Graveney Marsh =

WW2 battle in England (1940)

- Part of Battle of Britain
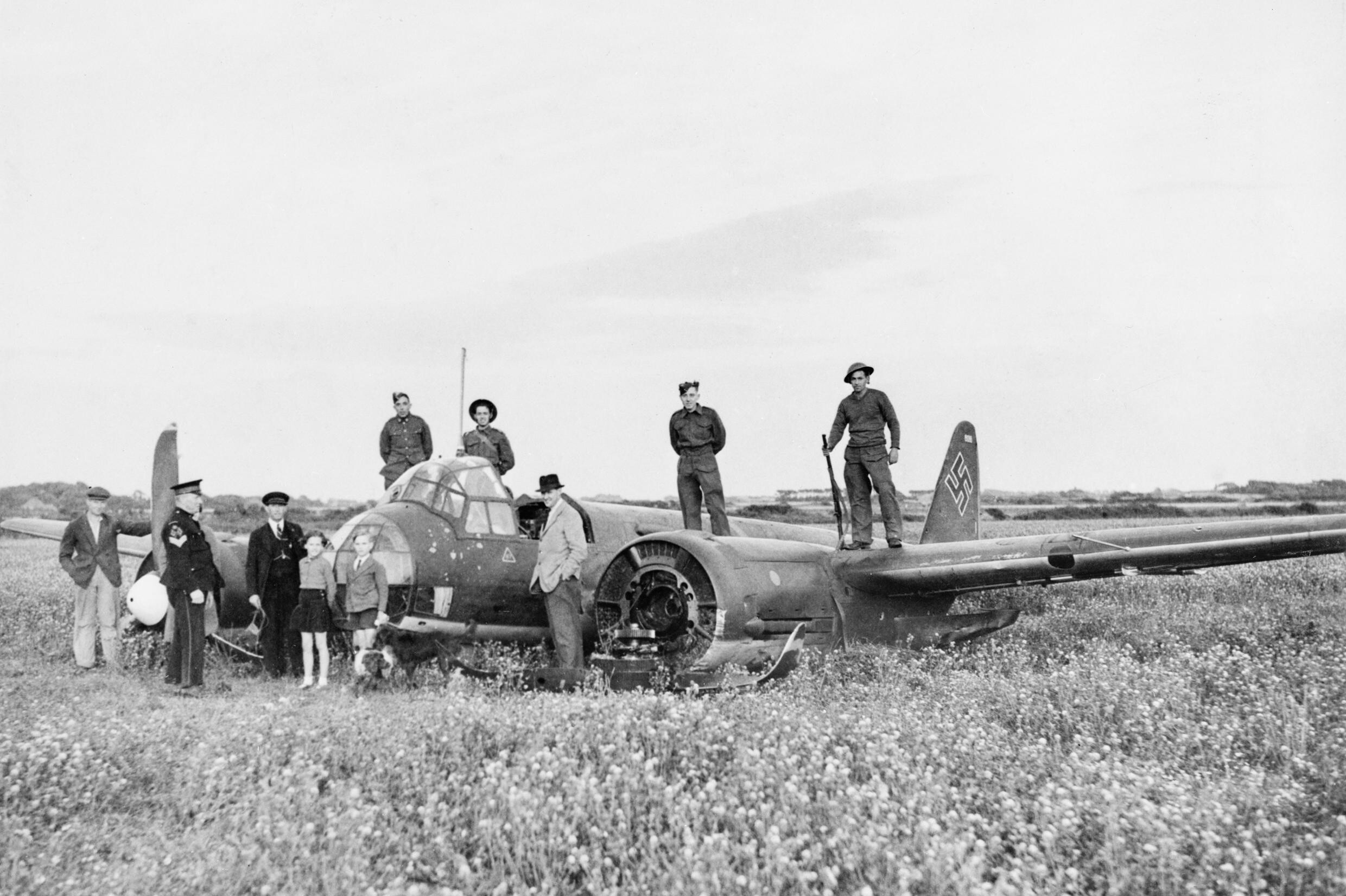
- Another Junkers Ju 88A-1, following a crash landing in England in 1940
Date	27 September 1940
Location	Graveney Marsh, Kent, England 51°20′38.18″N 00°57′31.99″E
Status	Military technology captured intact.

Belligerents
United Kingdom	Germany

Commanders and leaders
Captain John Cantopher	Unteroffizier Fritz Ruhlandt (POW)

Units involved
1st Battalion, London Irish Rifles	Luftwaffe bomber crew

Strength
One company	Four crew, armed with machine guns

Casualties and losses
None	Four POW, including one wounded
- Graveney Marsh, Kent

The Battle of Graveney Marsh, on the night of 27 September 1940 in the county of Kent, England, was the last ground engagement involving an organized foreign force to take place on the mainland of Great Britain. The fighting took place between the crew of a shot-down German Junkers Ju 88A-1 bomber from KG 77 and a detachment of soldiers from the 1st Battalion, London Irish Rifles (1 LIR), in Seasalter on the north Kent coast.

== The battle ==
The Ju 88, W.Nr 088 8099, 3Z+EL, and nicknamed Eule ("Owl") by its crew, was a new model and had only entered service two weeks earlier. The British forces were aware of the new model and had issued orders to capture one intact if at all possible. It was crewed by Unteroffizier (Uffz) Fritz Ruhlandt (pilot), Feldwebel Gotthard Richter (bomb aimer); Uffz Erwin Richter (radio operator/gunner); and Flieger (Airman) Jakob Reiner (gunner).

RAF fighter pilots, from 66 Squadron (Spitfire) and 92 Squadron (Spitfire), had attacked the Ju 88 over Faversham. Previously, fighter pilots had been ordered to, when possible, force German bomber crews to land or crash land, so that they and their aircraft could be captured intact, for intelligence purposes. On this occasion, one of the bomber's engines had already been damaged by anti-aircraft fire during a raid on London and, after the fighter pilots were able to destroy its remaining engine, Ruhlandt made a crash landing on Graveney Marsh. The entire crew survived the crash.

When members of 1 LIR, billeted nearby at the Sportsman Inn in Seasalter, arrived at the crash site, the four German aviators were attempting to destroy classified equipment on board the aircraft, According to some accounts, the Germans had armed themselves with machine guns previously fitted to the Ju 88 and a sub-machine gun. (The latter was part of a standard survival kit, issued at the time to the crews of Luftwaffe bomber, patrol and transport aircraft). The British opened fire and one of the Germans was hit in the foot. The crew then surrendered and were taken prisoner. The RAF Historical Branch later stated that “some sort of fight took place, but it is far from clear that the [German] crew fired at anything but their own aircraft.”

After one of the Germans indicated that the aircraft might explode at any moment, Captain John Cantopher located an object – which he described as a "black box" – and threw it away from the aircraft into a drainage ditch. Historian Don Hollway suggests that the object may have been the sealed housing of a secret BZA bombsight analogue computer; the Air Ministry hushed up the incident so as not to reveal to the Germans that their secret equipment had been recovered.

== Aftermath ==
The prisoners were taken to the Sportsman Inn and given pints of beer. The bomber was captured for examination by British experts. The aircraft was taken to Farnborough Airfield where it was said to have "provided highly valuable information". Cantopher was subsequently awarded the George Medal for his action.

== Commemoration ==
In September 2010, the London Irish Rifles Regimental Association marked its 70th anniversary by unveiling a commemorative plaque at the Sportsman pub.

== See also ==
- Herbert Schmid
