= BZA =

BZA may refer to:

- Benzanthrone, an aromatic hydrocarbon
- Board of zoning appeals
- Bombenzielanlage, or Bomb Ziel Automat, an analog bombsight computer, used to compute bomb release in German World War II bombers
- Bundesbahn Central Offices, Bundesbahn-Zentralämter
- Bonanza Airport/San Pedro Airport
- The station code for Vijayawada Junction railway station, Vijayawada, Andhra Pradesh, India
- The now-defunct vehicle registration code for Bad Bergzabern, Rhineland-Palatinate, Germany
