= Franklin White (dancer) =

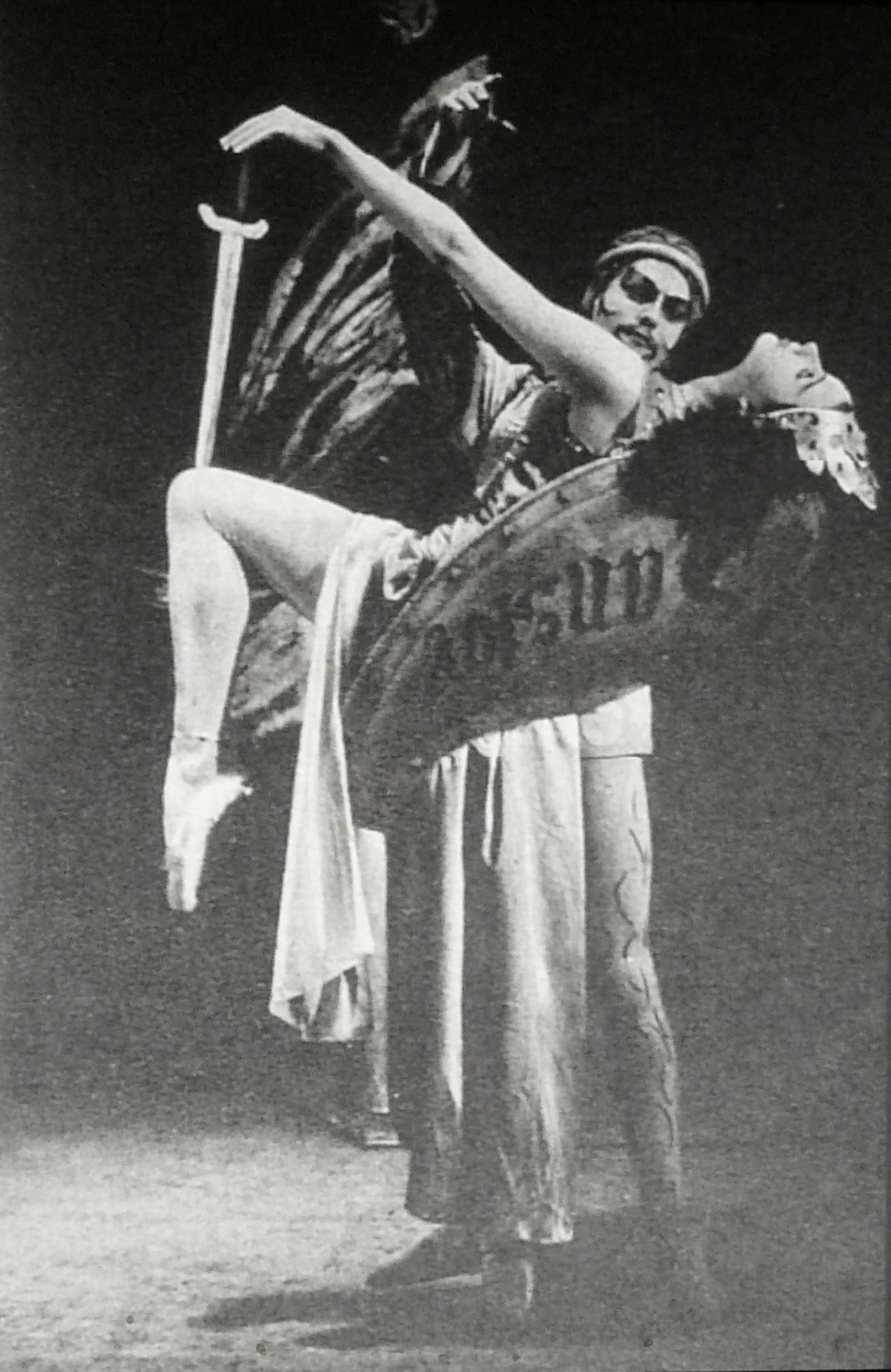
- Franklin White dancing in The Quest, 1943
- Born: Peter Franklin White; 27 January 1924; Shoreham, Kent, England
- Died: 19 May 2013 (aged 90); Carle Foundation Hospital, Urbana, Illinois, US
- Occupation: Ballet dancer
- Spouse: Joan Franklin-White
- Children: Michael Franklin-White
- Parent(s): Franklin White and Olga White, nee Hart

Peter Franklin White (1 February 1923 – 19 May 2013) was a British ballet dancer, a principal dancer with Ballet Rambert (1939–42) and The Royal Ballet (1942–66).

== Early life ==
Franklin White was born in Shoreham, Kent, England, the son of artist Franklin White (1892–1975) and violinist Olga White, née Hart.

== Career ==
White joined Ballet Rambert in 1939, aged 15, and in 1941/42 moved to the Sadler's Wells Ballet, which later became The Royal Ballet. He became principal character dancer and was considered one of the world's top balletic mimes.

In 1960, he created the role of Notary in Sir Frederick Ashton's La fille mal gardée for The Royal Ballet.

In the 1960s, he danced with Margot Fonteyn, Michael Somes, Rudolf Nureyev, Nadia Nerina, Beryl Grey, Moira Shearer and Alexander Grant, among others.

In 1966, he moved to Canada and later the US, where he became a lecturer and consultant in stage movement. In the 1970s, he was an assistant professor of theatre at the University of Illinois, UIUC, and dance teacher at the National Academy of Dance, Champaign.

== Later life ==
In his later life, known as Peter Franklin-White, he lived in Morgantown, West Virginia.

On 19 May 2013, he died at Carle Foundation Hospital, Urbana, Illinois, US, following a long illness. He was survived by his brother, Eddie Franklin of Montcharmont, France, his former wife, Joan Hunter (formerly Joan Franklin-White) of London, and his son, Michael Franklin-White, scene designer and scenic artist of Champaign.
