= Thomas Highgate =

British soldier and deserter (1895–1914)

- Born: Thomas James Highgate; 13 May 1895; Shoreham, Kent, England
- Died: 8 September 1914 (aged 19); Boissy-le-Châtel, Seine-et-Marne, France
- Cause of death: Execution (gunshot)
- Burial place: No known grave
- Military career
- Allegiance: United Kingdom
- Branch: British Army
- Service years: 1913–1914
- Rank: Private
- Units: 1st Battalion, Royal West Kent Regiment
- Conflicts: First World War; Western Front; Battle of Mons; Retreat from Mons; First Battle of the Marne (executed)

Private Thomas James Highgate (13 May 1895 – 8 September 1914) was a British soldier during the First World War and the first British soldier to be convicted of desertion and executed by firing squad on the Western Front. He was born in Shoreham, Kent, and worked as a farm labourer before joining the army in 1913 as a seaman. When the First World War began, he fought with the First Battalion of the Royal West Kents. Highgate was executed 35 days into the war, on 8 September 1914, after being found hiding in a farmhouse wearing civilian clothes. His death was made as public as possible and used as an example to other soldiers. Highgate's name was not included on the war memorial at Shoreham; from the late 1990s onwards, some local residents fought for his name to be added whilst others disagreed. Posthumous pardons for soldiers who had been executed, including Highgate, were announced in 2006.

== Early life ==
Thomas Highgate was born on 13 May 1895 in Shoreham, Kent. He was one of five sons to his mother, Alice Highgate. His family lived in poverty and travelled between Shoreham and the outskirts of London. Highgate is recorded as having worked as a farm labourer. On 4 February 1913, aged 17, he joined the army and served as a seaman. Whilst at sea, Highgate suffered a fall, was in two shipwrecks, and contracted yellow fever in Africa. Captain Tate, a medical officer at Richmond Barracks, produced a memorandum in June 1914 regarding Highgate's health. He wrote that Highgate had a "peculiar" disposition and that his illness and injury may have accounted for issues with memory loss. Highgate was recorded as being absent from the army before the First World War broke out; he did not attend tattoo on 7 September 1913 or 1 July 1914, and he deserted the army from 28 February to 4 May 1914. He was caught and imprisoned for 42 days when he tried to enlist with a different unit at Woolwich in order to be closer to his brother. Despite his absences, Highgate was described as a "good worker" in his army records.

== First World War ==
=== Desertion ===
During the First World War, Highgate was in the First Battalion of the Royal West Kents, one of the first battalions to enter combat. The battalion arrived in France on 15 August 1914 and fought in the Battle of Mons. By September 1914, the British Expeditionary Force were in retreat. Forty-thousand British soldiers fought in the battle, and 7,800 were killed. Early on the morning of 6 September 1914, Highgate left the frontline, saying he needed to "ease himself", and hid in a farmhouse. He was found while wearing civilian clothes and without his rifle by a gamekeeper, who was both English and a former soldier. Highgate's army uniform was discovered nearby. Historian Julian Putkowski wrote that the total time of Highgate's desertion was likely "no more than an hour or two". Highgate reportedly found the fighting too overwhelming; he is recorded as having said to the gamekeeper, "I want to get out of it and this is how I am doing it". He was arrested by the gendarmes and taken into custody by Captain Milward. Highgate told Milward that he did not remember having done anything except leave his bivouac shelter. In court, Highgate said that he remembered walking around, entering the farm, lying down in a civilian house, and putting on civilian clothes but did not recall much else.

Highgate was not the only soldier to act "dishonourably" during the retreat from Mons; two officers attempted to surrender their battalions to the enemy. They were discharged and did not face the death penalty. There were other instances of soldiers looting and travelling with civilians, as well as one allegation of rape. As a result, there were concerns about discipline throughout the British Expeditionary Force.

=== Execution ===
Highgate was accused of desertion, and a field general court-martial was arranged a few hours after he was discovered in the farm house. He was unable to call members of his battalion as witnesses as they had all been killed, captured or injured during the Battle of Mons. He also did not have an officer to speak in his defence (a "prisoner's friend"), despite that being his right. Two days later, on 8 September, he was executed by a firing squad consisting of men from the 1st Battalion, Bedfordshire Regiment in the 15th Brigade. Highgate died at 7:07, 45 minutes after he himself found out about his guilty verdict. Aged 19, Highgate was the first British soldier to be executed for desertion on the Western Front, 35 days after the war began.

Putkowski said that there may have been a "crisis of confidence" amongst senior army officers, who at the time of Highgate's trial had seen the deaths of 20,000 men from the British Expeditionary Force and many others wounded or missing. Highgate's death was used as a disciplinary tool for the army. General Sir Horace Smith-Dorrien said that he "should be killed as publicly as possible". Men from the 1st Battalion, Cheshire Regiment and 1st Battalion, Dorset Regiment witnessed the execution in person. Highgate's death was also publicised in the army Routine Orders. According to the diary of General Smith-Dorrien, two men were executed on 7 September, one for plundering and another for desertion. Putkowski writes that the date must be a mistake on Smith-Dorrien's part, as the recorded execution was most likely Highgate, and there is no evidence of a man being shot for plundering on that day. Historians Cathryn Corns and John Hughes-Wilson noted that there was 'little doubt that he intended to desert' and being found in civilian clothing whilst his regiment was due to advance constituted proof that he intended 'to permanently avoid a military duty'.

A notice in the Sidcup and District Times on 23 June 1916 reported that Highgate had been killed in 1915 and had fought with the East Surrey Regiment. Michael Hankins, a local historian in Sidcup, speculated that this report was incorrect because Highgate's family were attempting to change the story. In Soldiers Died in the Great War (1921), Highgate is listed as having died of his wounds—Putkowski notes that this is unusual, as soldiers who had been executed by firing squad were not usually included in these volumes.

== Memorial ==
Highgate was commemorated by the Commonwealth War Graves Commission on the La Ferté-sous-Jouarre memorial with other British soldiers who have no known grave. Also known as the Memorial to the Missing of the Marne, it was erected in 1928.

The names of soldiers executed for crimes including cowardice and desertion were not likely to appear on local war memorials, and the memorial in Shoreham, Highgate's home village, did not bear his name when it was erected. In 1999, some people in the village—including the vicar and padre, Reverend Barry Simmons—argued that his name should be included. The proposal was opposed by the Royal British Legion. A vote was held among members of the British Legion; the result was split at 14 for, 14 against, and two abstains. In March 2000, the British Legion was in the process of restoring the memorial, which provided an opportunity to add Highgate's name. Reverend Simmons believed the villagers should decide, so a vote was held for the 1,700 residents of Shoreham to decide whether Highgate's name would be added to the memorial. 79% of people were in favour (170 voted for, 46 against), but the local councillors voted 4–3 against the decision. The council wanted to wait to see if the government pardoned men who were shot for desertion before adding Highgate's name. A gap was left on the memorial in case his name should be added at a later date. Reverend Simmons expressed unhappiness with the conclusion, saying that Highgate had served his country by dying as a deterrent, but other villagers welcomed the council's decision. The result of the council's decision led to Simmons leaving his position at the parish for another in Gloucestershire.

In 2006, the government granted posthumous pardons to men who were shot for cowardice and other crimes during the First World War, but Highgate's name remained missing from the memorial. Highgate's great nephew, Terence Highgate, was still campaigning for his name to be added in 2014.

During the campaign to have Highgate's name added to the memorial, a local historian discovered that his name already appeared on another memorial in Sidcup. The Sidcup memorial lists Thomas Highgate and two brothers: L/Cpl Robert Highgate, killed in France on 3 January 1915 aged 24, and Pte Joseph Highgate, who died of his wounds on 6 June 1916 aged 19. Highgate's name is also shown on the British memorial to the missing at La Ferté-sous-Jouarre and the Roll of Honour of the Royal West Kent Regiment. He may have ended up on multiple memorials due to his lifestyle, travelling around as a farm labourer.

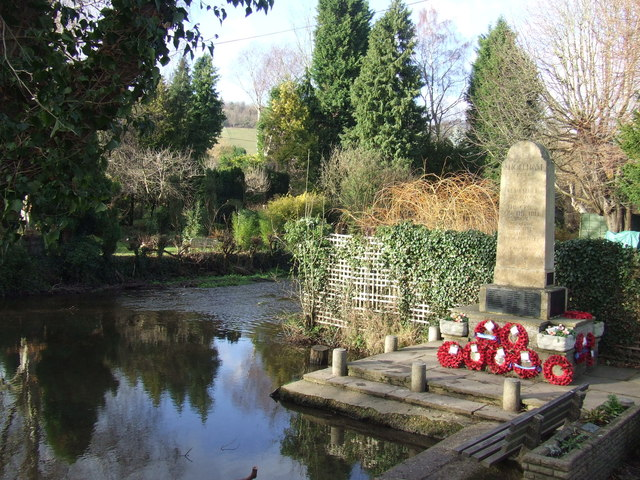
Thomas Highgate's name was not added to the war memorial in Shoreham.

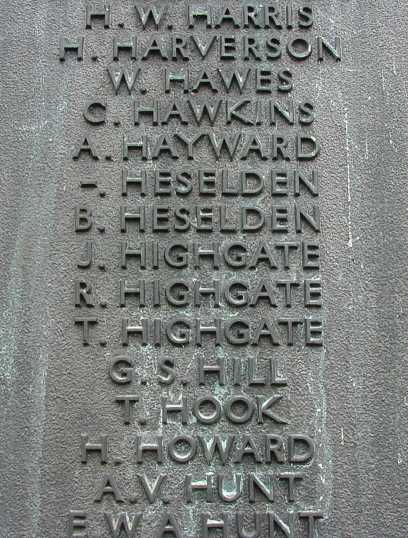
Thomas Highgate and his brothers' names were included on a war memorial in Sidcup.

== See also ==
- Capital punishment in the United Kingdom
- Harry Farr
- Shot at Dawn Memorial

== Bibliography ==
- Johnson, David (2015). Executed at Dawn: British Firing Squads on the Western Front 1914–1918. United Kingdom: The History Press. ISBN 978-0-7509-5917-9.
- Putkowski, Julian; Sykes, Julian (1990). Shot at Dawn. United Kingdom: Pen and Sword Books. ISBN 978-1473818156.
- Tomasini, Floris (2017). Remembering and Disremembering the Dead. United Kingdom: Palgrave MacMillan. ISBN 978-1-137-53828-4.
