= Hugh Wilson (RAF officer) =

Royal Air Force test pilot and world airspeed record holder (1908–1990)

Group Captain Hugh Wilson CBE AFC**
- Nickname: Willie
- Born: 28 May 1908; Islington, London
- Died: 5 September 1990 (aged 82) Westminster, London
- Allegiance: United Kingdom
- Branch: Royal Air Force
- Service years: 1929–1948
- Rank: Group Captain
- Commands: Commanding Officer - Aerodynamic Flight, RAE; Commanding Officer - Empire Test Pilots' School
- Conflicts: World War II
- Awards: Order of the British Empire CBE Air Force Cross and Bar (United Kingdom) AFC & Bar
- Spouses: Isobel Moira Sergeant (m. 1947); Patricia Frances Shanley (m. 1959)

Hugh Joseph Wilson CBE AFC** known as (28 May 1908 – 5 September 1990), nicknamed "Willie", was a senior Royal Air Force officer. He served as the RAF's main chief test pilot for captured enemy aircraft in World War II and in November 1945 was the first man to exceed 600 miles per hour (970 km/h), flying a Gloster Meteor jet fighter.

== Biography ==
Born in 1908, Wilson was the only son of Alfred Wilson and Jessie (née Wood Young). He was educated at Hastings' University School, Merchant Taylors' School in Northwood and City of London School. After leaving school he began an apprenticeship with a cotton manufacturer.

== RAF career ==
On 13 September 1929, Wilson joined the RAF within the General Duties Branch on a short service commission. He trained at the No. 5 Flight Training School and was later posted to No. 111 Squadron. Exactly five years after joining the RAF in 1934 he was placed on the Reserve of Air Force Officers. Whilst on this reserve list he passed a conversion course on flying boats and also passed as a flying instructor.

In the mid-1930s he worked as a test pilot for Blackburn Aircraft and was, in 1938, the first to fly the Blackburn Roc. He later worked at the Royal Aircraft Establishment at Farnborough as a civil test pilot.

=== World War II ===
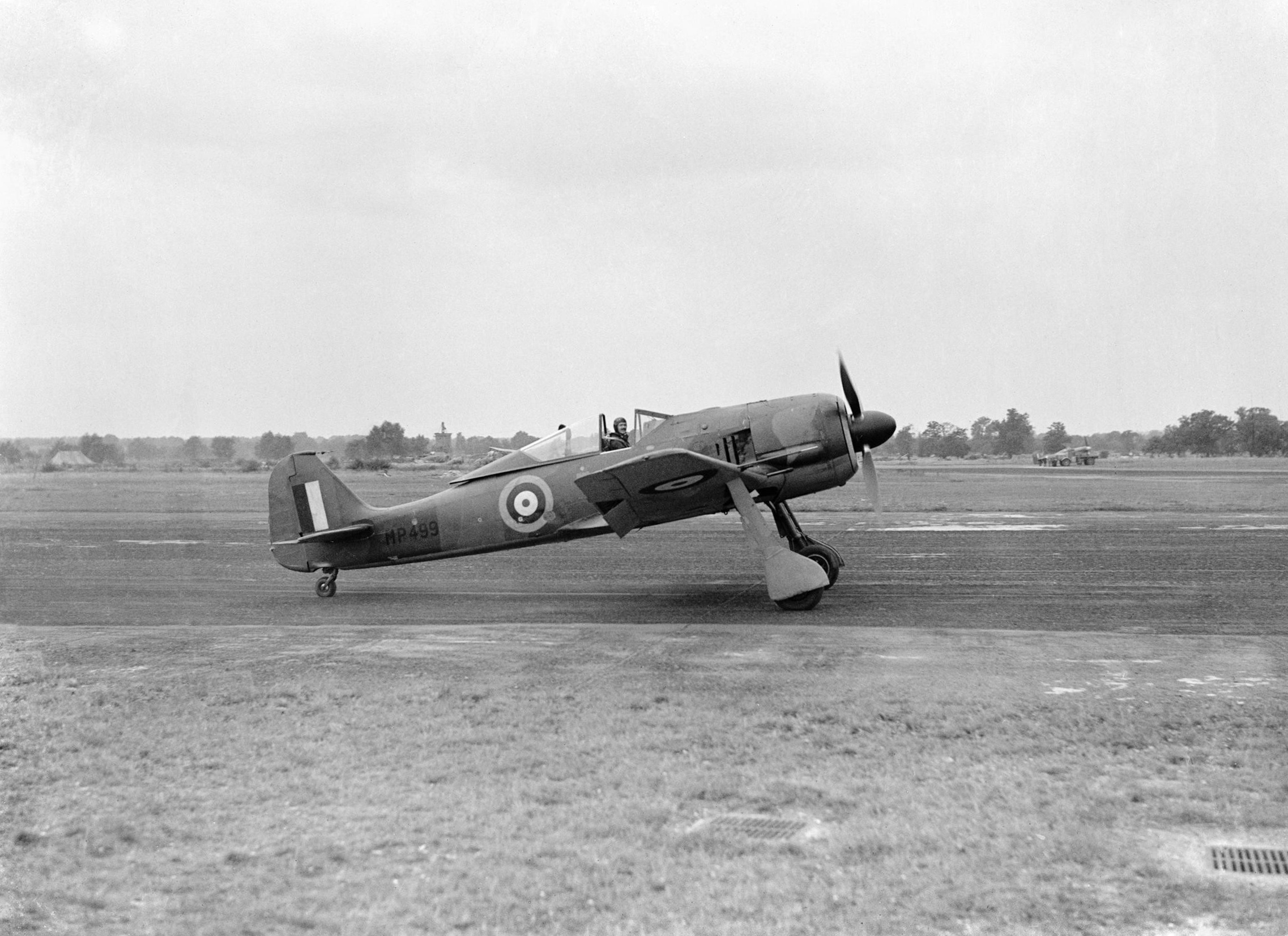
A captured Focke Wulf Fw 190A-3 at the Royal Aircraft Establishment, Farnborough, with the RAE's chief test pilot, Wing Commander H J "Willie" Wilson at the controls, August 1942.

Recalled to active service with the RAF in 1939, Wilson was the Commanding Officer of the Aerodynamic Flight of the RAE at RAF Farnborough.

Between 1941 and the end of the war Wilson was the RAF's main test pilot on all captured enemy aircraft. Flying these aircraft from RAF Farnborough (they had been repainted with RAF roundels), Wilson would evaluate their handling and performance (see Armin Faber incident).

After a short period working in America as a test pilot, Wilson joined No. 616 Squadron in 1944 to train pilots on Britain's first jet fighter, the Gloster Meteor. He subsequently became Officer Commanding of the Empire Test Pilots' School at RAF Cranfield.

==== Awards ====
- Order of the British Empire (Commander) (CBE)
- Air Force Cross and two Bars (United Kingdom) (AFC & two Bars)

== World air speed record ==
On 7 November 1945, flying the Gloster Meteor Britannia (EE454) over a 1.86 miles (2.99 km) course at Herne Bay in Kent, Wilson averaged a new world air speed record for a jet fighter of 606.38 miles per hour (975.87 km/h).

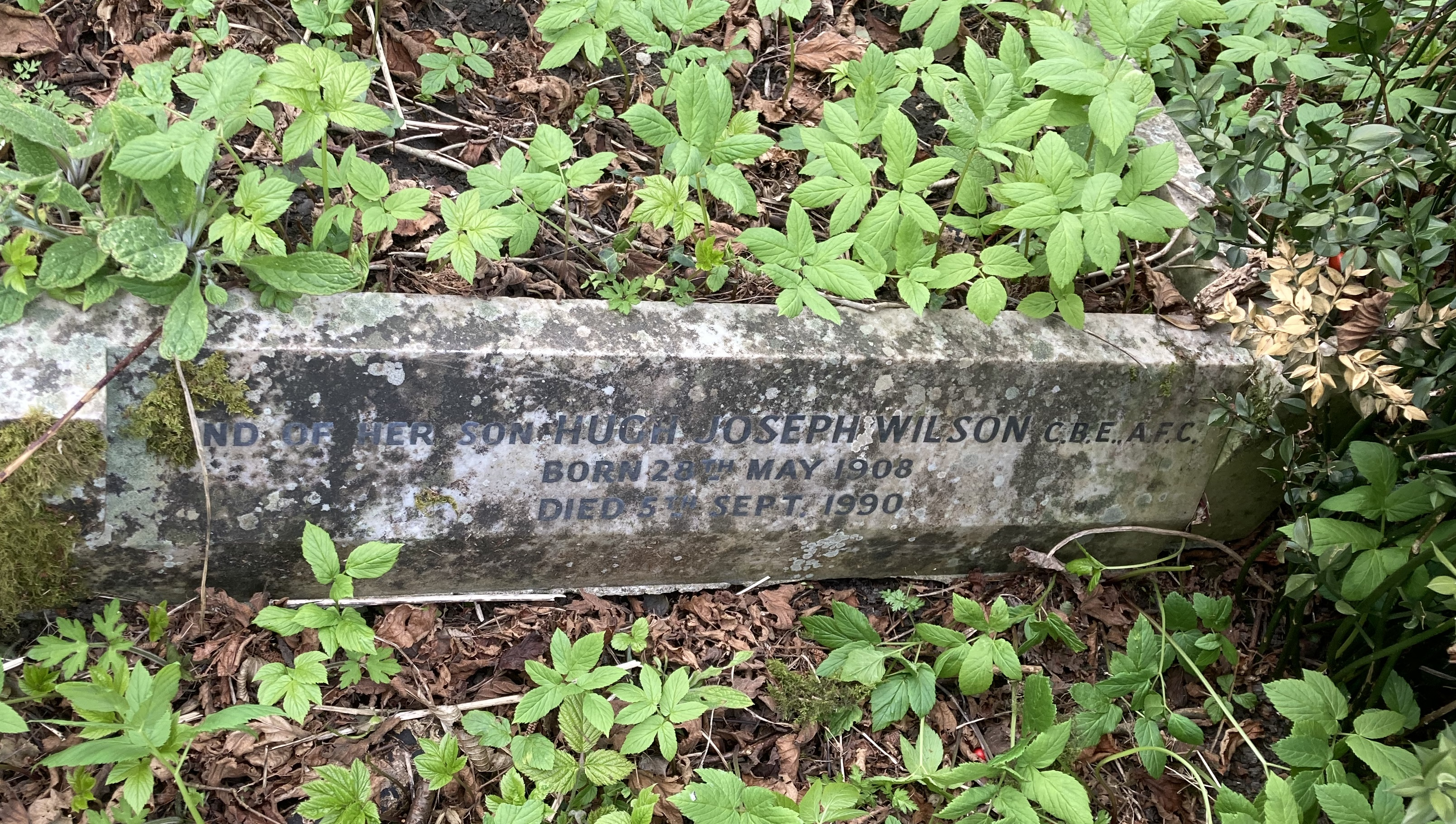
Grave of Hugh Joseph Wilson in Highgate Cemetery

== Later career ==
After leaving the RAF with the rank of Group Captain, Wilson worked as an engine salesman for Blackburn Aircraft and Rolls-Royce.

== Personal life ==
Wilson was married twice, first to Isobel Moira Sergeant in 1947 (they had one son) and then in 1959 to Patricia Frances Shanley Warren and had two more sons. He died on 5 September 1990 and was buried in a family grave in Highgate Cemetery.
