= Seasalter =

Village in Kent, England

Coordinates: 51.3456°N 0.9981°E

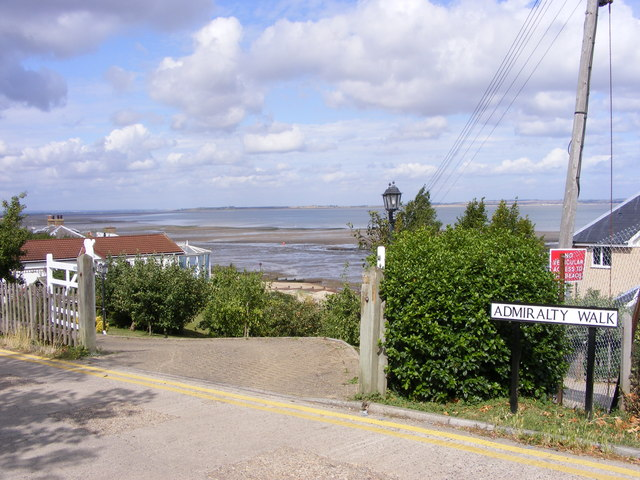
- Admiralty Walk

- Location within Kent
- Population: 7,967 (2011)
- OS grid reference: TR094653
- District: Canterbury
- Shire county: Kent
- Region: South East
- Country: England
- Sovereign state: United Kingdom
- Post town: WHITSTABLE
- Postcode district: CT5
- Dialling code: 01227
- Police: Kent
- Fire: Kent
- Ambulance: South East Coast
- UK Parliament: Canterbury

Seasalter is a village in the Canterbury district, on the north coast of Kent, England, between Whitstable and Faversham, facing the Isle of Sheppey across the estuary of the River Swale, 6 miles (10 km) north of Canterbury.

== History ==
Seasalter came to prominence as a centre for salt production in the Iron Age, and the resulting prosperity resulted in Viking raids on the area. Later, the Domesday Book recorded that Seasalter "properly belongs to the kitchen of the Archbishop" [of Canterbury]. The church was dedicated to a martyred Archbishop of Canterbury, Alphege (Ælfheah), first built in the 12th century, its nave was demolished in the 1840s but its chancel still stands and is a Grade II listed building. In the 18th century, the marshes were drained to create the Seasalter Levels.

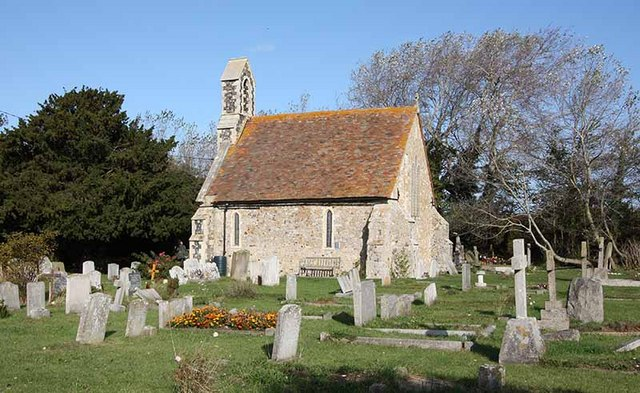
St Alphege church, Seasalter

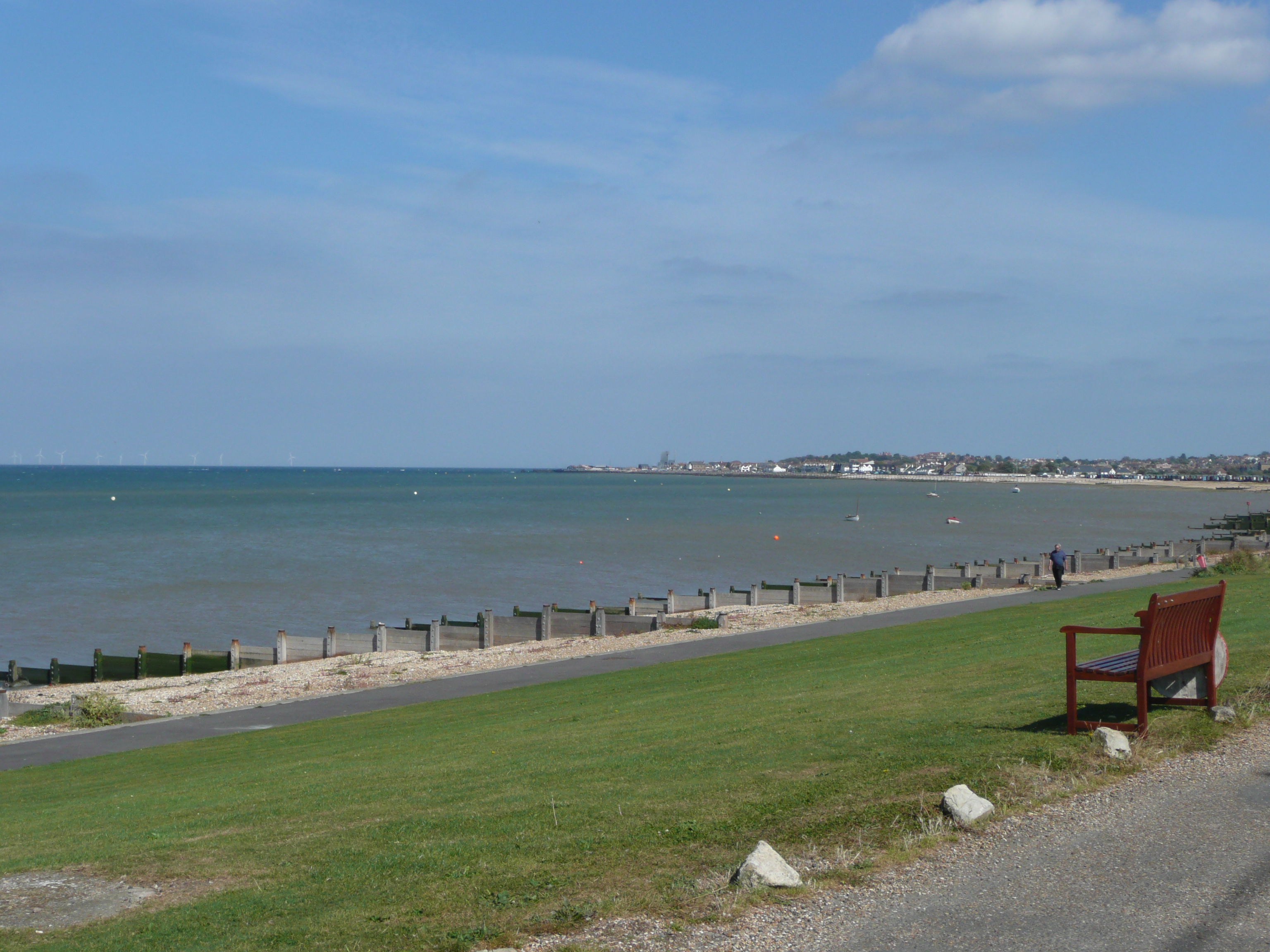
Seasalter Beach

In 1891 the civil parish had a population of 1397. In 1894 the parish was abolished to form Whitstable Urban and Whitstable cum Seasalter. It is now in the unparished area of Whitstable.

In 2017, the Old Brig, a well-preserved 18th century merchant ship wreck was exposed by tides near Seasalter. It is one of only three known coastal trading vessels in England from the Hanoverian period and was listed as a Scheduled Monument by Historic England in 2020.

== Modern day ==
Seasalter today is primarily a residential satellite of Whitstable, and further housing development is unlikely as it is constrained by the sea, the Seasalter Flats protected marshland, and the A299 road. The beach at Seasalter is largely pebble-stone based, and therefore unpopular compared with the more sandy bays at, for example, Westgate-on-Sea. Seasalter Sailing Club, which has a clubhouse on Faversham Road, primarily hosts Catamaran boats which race on the Swale River estuary. There is also a private Water Ski Club with launch ramp, and a caravan park.

The Sportsman pub, at the western end of the village by the marshes, on a site which has hosted an inn since 1642, has maintained a Michelin star since 2008. During the Second World War it was the billet for a company of the 1st Battalion London Irish Rifles. In September 1940 these troops happened to successfully engage the crew of a crashed German airplane on nearby Graveney Marsh, and in 2010 to mark the 70th anniversary, a commemorative plaque was unveiled at the pub.

Famous residents with homes or holiday houses in Seasalter include Gregg Wallace, Harry Hill and Janet Street-Porter. The late Peter Cushing used to live further along the coast in Wave Crest, Whitstable.

Whitstable's Oyster Fishery uses oyster beds lying in the mud approximately a mile offshore from the Seasalter. These are usually submerged and only revealed at low tide.

In 1976, a free rock festival was held in Seasalter after a forced move away from the chosen site in Tangmere.

== Transport ==
Despite the Chatham Main Line Railway passing through Seasalter, there is no station. It has long been proposed to build one, with railway maps noting a possible site; this is unlikely given the proximity of Whitstable Station. Currently the village is served by Stagecoach buses from Canterbury, Whitstable and Faversham.

== In popular culture ==
Author Russell Hoban repurposes Seasalter as "Littl Salting" in his 1980, post apocalyptic novel Riddley Walker.

Notably, the South African winery Groote Post produces a premium Sauvignon Blanc blend called "Seasalter." The wine's name was inspired by the coastal town of Seasalter in Kent, UK, reflecting the winery's appreciation for their maritime influence.

The Seasalter wine is known for its captivating notes of citrus, stone fruit, and green apple, with hints of fynbos, kelp, sea breeze, and a touch of oak, embodying the essence of its namesake.
