= Listed buildings in Shoreham, Kent =

Civil Parish in Kent, England

Shoreham is a village and civil parish in the Sevenoaks District of Kent, England. It contains one grade I, one grade II* and 55 grade II listed buildings that are recorded in the National Heritage List for England.

This list is based on the information retrieved online from Historic England.

== Key ==
Grade	Criteria
I	Buildings that are of exceptional interest
II*	Particularly important buildings of more than special interest
II	Buildings that are of special interest

== Listing ==
Name	Grade	Location	Type	Completed (Note: The date given is the date used by Historic England as significant for the initial building or that of an important part in the structure's description.)	Date designated	Grid ref. (Note: The grid reference is based on the British national grid reference system, sometimes known as OSGB36, used by the Ordnance Survey.) Geo-coordinates	Notes	Entry number (Note: The "List Entry Number" is a unique number assigned to each listed building and scheduled monument by Historic England.)	Image	Wikidata
Shoreham War Memorial	II	TN14 7SE			28 July 2015	TQ5205261651; 51°20′01″N 0°10′53″E		1427626	Shoreham War Memorial More images	Q26677366
Castle Farm Cottages	II	5, Castle Farm Road, Castle Farm			16 January 1975	TQ5253863577; 51°21′03″N 0°11′21″E		1272734	Upload Photo	Q26562549
Castle Farmhouse	II	Castle Farm Road, Castle Farm			10 September 1954	TQ5256963555; 51°21′02″N 0°11′22″E		1272733	Upload Photo	Q26562548
Garden Boundary Wall to Castle Farmhouse	II	Castle Farm Road, Castle Farm			16 January 1975	TQ5256863528; 51°21′01″N 0°11′22″E		1243728	Upload Photo	Q26536394
Wall to East of Castle Farmhouse	II	Castle Farm Road, Castle Farm			10 September 1954	TQ5259663564; 51°21′02″N 0°11′24″E		1243727	Upload Photo	Q26536393
Bridge Cottage	II	Church Street			16 January 1975	TQ5207061644; 51°20′01″N 0°10′54″E		1272700	Upload Photo	Q26562520
Bridge Over the River Darent	II	Church Street			10 September 1954	TQ5204461638; 51°20′01″N 0°10′52″E		1243736	Bridge Over the River Darent More images	Q26536402
Church Cottages	II	1-5, Church Street			16 January 1975	TQ5220861589; 51°19′59″N 0°11′01″E		1243733	Upload Photo	Q26536399
Church Cottages	II	6 and 8, Church Street			16 January 1975	TQ5220761612; 51°20′00″N 0°11′01″E		1272738	Upload Photo	Q26683075
Church of St Peter and St Paul	I	Church Street			10 September 1954	TQ5227961590; 51°19′59″N 0°11′04″E		1243786	Church of St Peter and St Paul More images	Q17529883
Coachmans Cottage the Old Vicarage	II	Church Street			16 January 1975	TQ5222661564; 51°19′58″N 0°11′01″E		1243808	Upload Photo	Q26536471
Garden Wall of Shoreham House	II	Church Street			16 January 1975	TQ5211361602; 51°19′59″N 0°10′56″E		1272684	Upload Photo	Q26562505
Ivy Cottage Waterfall Cottage	II	Church Street			10 September 1954	TQ5209961617; 51°20′00″N 0°10′55″E		1243735	Upload Photo	Q26536401
Ivy Cottage and Tudor Cottage	II	Church Street			16 January 1975	TQ5216361606; 51°19′59″N 0°10′58″E		1243819	Upload Photo	Q26536481
Old Darent Cottage	II	Church Street			16 January 1975	TQ5193361598; 51°19′59″N 0°10′46″E		1272741	Upload Photo	Q26562556
Outbuildings to Rear of Old George Inn	II	Church Street			16 January 1975	TQ5217561572; 51°19′58″N 0°10′59″E		1243737	Upload Photo	Q26536403
Record and Little Record Adjoining	II	Church Street			16 January 1975	TQ5212261612; 51°20′00″N 0°10′56″E		1243734	Upload Photo	Q26536400
Reed Beds the Samuel Palmer School of Fine Art	II	Church Street			10 September 1954	TQ5186161622; 51°20′00″N 0°10′43″E		1272740	Upload Photo	Q26562555
Rising Sun	II	Church Street			16 January 1975	TQ5207461639; 51°20′01″N 0°10′54″E		1272739	Upload Photo	Q26562554
Riverside House	II	Church Street			10 September 1954	TQ5208961630; 51°20′00″N 0°10′54″E		1272699	Upload Photo	Q26562519
The Old George Inn	II	Church Street			10 September 1954	TQ5218761581; 51°19′59″N 0°10′59″E		1272682	The Old George Inn More images	Q26562503
Wall and Lych Gate to Church of St Peter and St Paul	II	Church Street			16 January 1975	TQ5221661584; 51°19′59″N 0°11′01″E		1272737	Upload Photo	Q26562552
Waterfall Cottage Studio Waterfall Cottage Tea Room	II	Church Street			16 January 1975	TQ5210861614; 51°20′00″N 0°10′55″E		1272698	Upload Photo	Q26562518
Chapel Alley Cottages	II	1-5, Darenth Way			5 February 1973	TQ5208361674; 51°20′02″N 0°10′54″E		1243838	Upload Photo	Q26536495
Flint Cottage	II	Darenth Way			16 January 1975	TQ5206961679; 51°20′02″N 0°10′54″E		1243738	Upload Photo	Q26536404
Waterhouse	II	Darenth Way			10 September 1954	TQ5204961705; 51°20′03″N 0°10′53″E		1243739	Upload Photo	Q26536405
Dunstall Farmhouse	II	Fackenden Lane, Dunstall Farm			16 January 1975	TQ5353461232; 51°19′46″N 0°12′08″E		1243729	Upload Photo	Q26536395
Filston Hall Farmhouse	II*	Filston Lane, Filstone Hall Farm			10 September 1954	TQ5160560778; 51°19′33″N 0°10′28″E		1243841	Filston Hall Farmhouse More images	Q17545604
Oast Houses and Cooling Shed to North West of Filston Hall Farmhouse	II	Filston Lane, Filston Hall Farm			16 January 1975	TQ5155660837; 51°19′35″N 0°10′26″E		1243740	Upload Photo	Q26536406
Old Cottage	II	Filston Lane			16 January 1975	TQ5161761176; 51°19′46″N 0°10′29″E		1272742	Upload Photo	Q26562557
Row of Almshouses at Corner of Church Street	II	Filston Lane			16 January 1975	TQ5182361595; 51°19′59″N 0°10′41″E		1272685	Upload Photo	Q26562506
Sepham Court	II	Filston Lane			16 January 1975	TQ5108160064; 51°19′11″N 0°10′00″E		1243842	Upload Photo	Q26536498
1, High Street	II	1, High Street			16 January 1975	TQ5180361616; 51°20′00″N 0°10′40″E		1243849	Upload Photo	Q26536505
29-33, High Street	II	29-33, High Street			16 January 1975	TQ5178161811; 51°20′06″N 0°10′39″E		1243744	Upload Photo	Q26536410
35 and 37, High Street	II	35 and 37, High Street			16 January 1975	TQ5179761837; 51°20′07″N 0°10′40″E		1243851	Upload Photo	Q26536507
Friars Pilgrims	II	28, High Street			16 January 1975	TQ5181061756; 51°20′05″N 0°10′40″E		1272687	Upload Photo	Q26562508
Holly Place	II	20, High Street			10 September 1954	TQ5182261730; 51°20′04″N 0°10′41″E		1243741	Upload Photo	Q26536407
Smithy Building Adjoining No 38 the Old Forge	II	High Street			16 January 1975	TQ5181561815; 51°20′07″N 0°10′41″E		1243847	Upload Photo	Q26536503
The Crown Inn	II	High Street			16 January 1975	TQ5183662078; 51°20′15″N 0°10′42″E		1243743	Upload Photo	Q26536409
Winslade Cottage	II	32, High Street			16 January 1975	TQ5181161788; 51°20′06″N 0°10′40″E		1243742	Upload Photo	Q26536408
Mill Lane Cottages	II	1 and 2, Mill Lane			24 September 1974	TQ5193462119; 51°20′16″N 0°10′47″E		1243746	Upload Photo	Q26536412
Mill Lane Cottages	II	3-5, Mill Lane			16 January 1975	TQ5191962121; 51°20′16″N 0°10′46″E		1243852	Upload Photo	Q26680918
Oxbourne Farmhouse	II	Mill Lane			16 January 1975	TQ5183762182; 51°20′18″N 0°10′42″E		1243745	Upload Photo	Q26536411
The Mill	II	Mill Lane			16 January 1975	TQ5199962113; 51°20′16″N 0°10′51″E		1243747	Upload Photo	Q26536413
Porter's Farmhouse	II	Otford Hills, Porter's Farm			16 January 1975	TQ5548160898; 51°19′33″N 0°13′48″E		1272736	Upload Photo	Q26562551
K6 Telephone Kiosk	II	Rock Hill, Chelsfield			27 September 1991	TQ4945063926; 51°21′17″N 0°08′42″E		1186835	Upload Photo	Q26482075
Rock Cottage	II	Rock Hill, Orpington, Chelsfield			29 June 1973	TQ4943563920; 51°21′17″N 0°08′41″E		1281245	Upload Photo	Q26570308
The Rock and Fountain Public House	II	Rock Hill, Orpington, Chelsfield			29 June 1973	TQ4945463916; 51°21′17″N 0°08′42″E		1186786	The Rock and Fountain Public House More images	Q26482022
Paines Farmhouse	II	Rowdow Lane, Paines Farm			16 January 1975	TQ5423860198; 51°19′12″N 0°12′43″E		1272735	Upload Photo	Q26562550
Darenth House Darenth Hulme	II	Shacklands Road			16 January 1975	TQ5160662339; 51°20′24″N 0°10′31″E		1243748	Upload Photo	Q26536414
Stable Building to North of the Coach House at Darenth Hulme	II	Shacklands Road			16 January 1975	TQ5156662350; 51°20′24″N 0°10′29″E		1243750	Upload Photo	Q26536416
The Coach House at Darenth Hulme	II	Shacklands Road			16 January 1975	TQ5158162337; 51°20′24″N 0°10′29″E		1243749	Upload Photo	Q26536415
Dunstall Priory	II	Shoreham Road			10 September 1954	TQ5290761867; 51°20′07″N 0°11′37″E		1272744	Upload Photo	Q26562559
Two Urns Flanking Drive to Dunstall Priory	II	Shoreham Road			16 January 1975	TQ5265061844; 51°20′07″N 0°11′24″E		1243751	Upload Photo	Q26536417
K6 Telephone Kiosk Beside Forge	II	Shoreham Village Centre			25 November 1987	TQ5182361826; 51°20′07″N 0°10′41″E		1244198	Upload Photo	Q26536830
Kennel Cottage	II	Water Lane			16 January 1975	TQ5167760971; 51°19′39″N 0°10′32″E		1243732	Upload Photo	Q26536398
Yew Tree Cottage	II	Water Lane			16 January 1975	TQ5158860991; 51°19′40″N 0°10′28″E		1243731	Upload Photo	Q26536397

== See also ==
- Grade I listed buildings in Kent
- Grade II* listed buildings in Kent

== Sources ==
- Newman, John (2012) [1969], Kent: West and the Weald, The Buildings of England, New Haven and London: Yale University Press, ISBN 978-0-300-18509-6
