= Richard Atcherley =

Royal Air Force Air Marshal (1904–1970)

Sir Richard Atcherley
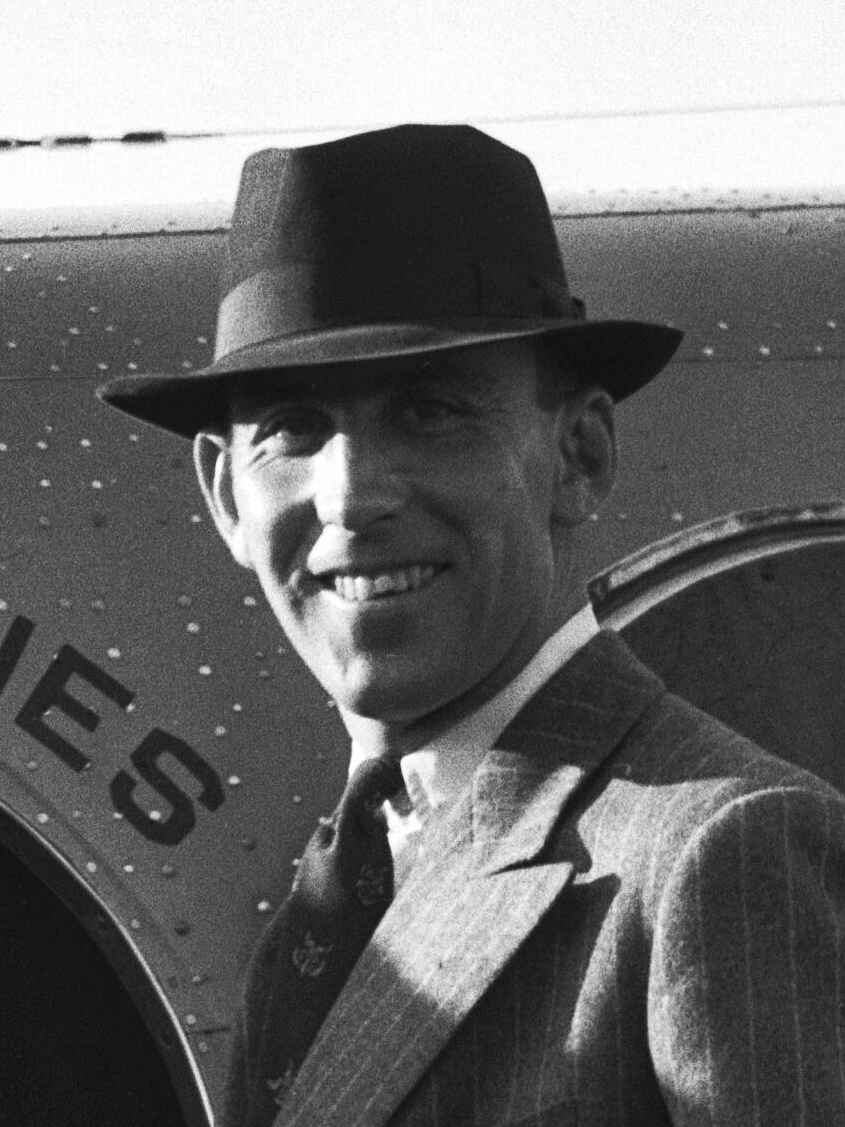
- Air Vice Marshal R L Atcherley
- Born: 12 January 1904; York, England
- Died: 18 April 1970 (aged 66); Aldershot, England
- Relatives: Air Vice Marshal David Atcherley (brother)
- Military career
- Allegiance: United Kingdom
- Branch: Royal Air Force
- Service years: 1922–59
- Rank: Air marshal
- Nickname: Batchy
- Commands: Flying Training Command (1955–59); No. 12 Group (1951–53); Chief of the Pakistani Air Staff (1949–51); RAF College Cranwell (1945–49); Central Fighter Establishment (1945); No. 211 Group (1943); RAF Kenley (1942–43); RAF Fairwood Common (1942); RAF Drem (1940–41); No. 219 Squadron (1939–40)
- Conflicts: Second World War; 1949 Mughalgai raid
- Awards: Knight Commander of the Order of the British Empire; Companion of the Order of the Bath; Air Force Cross & Bar; Mentioned in dispatches (3); War Cross (Norway)

Air Marshal Sir Richard Llewellyn Roger Atcherley, KBE, CB, AFC & Bar (12 January 1904 – 18 April 1970) was a senior Royal Air Force officer. He served as Commander-in-Chief of the Royal Pakistan Air Force from 1949 to 1951. His final appointment before retiring from the RAF was Air Officer Commanding-in-Chief of Flying Training Command.

== Early life ==
Richard Atcherley and his twin David were born on 12 January 1904.

They were the sons of Major General Sir Llewellyn Atcherley, Chief Constable of the West Riding of Yorkshire, and his wife, Eleanor Frances "Nelly" Mickelthwait (1871–1957), daughter of Richard Mickelthwait, of Ardsley House, in the valley of Deane near Barnsley. The Atcherley twins were first cousins of William Empson, a literary critic and poet, and both attended Oundle School in Northamptonshire.

== RAF career ==
In 1922, Atcherley attended the RAF College Cranwell and was commissioned two years later. He initially served as a pilot on No. 29 Squadron, flying Snipes out of Duxford. In 1925, Atcherley attended the Central Flying School and then returned to his squadron as both a pilot and a qualified flying instructor.

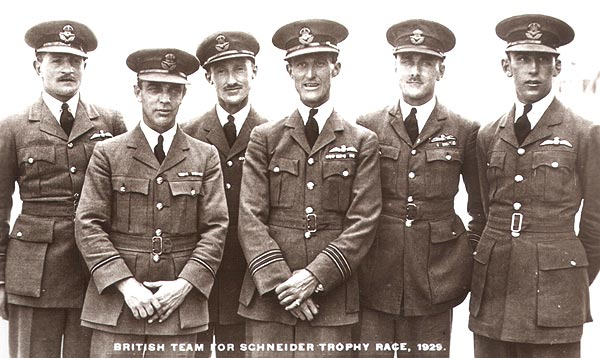
The RAF team for Schneider Trophy race 1929. Atcherley is shown on the right.

He was a member of the RAF team that competed for the Schneider Trophy in 1929.

=== Second World War ===
Atcherley was appointed Officer Commanding No. 219 Squadron in October 1939 and then became Officer Commanding the Air Element of the British Expeditionary Force in Norway in May 1940.

He went on to be Station Commander at RAF Drem in Scotland in June 1940 in which year he was also awarded the Air Force Cross. He was awarded a bar to his Air Force Cross on 24 September 1941. In 1942 he served as Station Commander at RAF Fairwood Common and then at RAF Kenley.

He was promoted to temporary group captain on 27 March 1942. In April 1943 Atcherley became Air Officer Commanding of No. 211 Group at Tripoli in Libya. At the time of the invasion of Sicily (Operation Husky) on 10 July 1943, No. 211 Group was the primary fighter force of Air Vice Marshal Harry Broadhurst's Desert Air Force, a sub-command of Air Marshal Sir Arthur Coningham's Northwest African Tactical Air Force.

Later that year he transferred to Headquarters RAF Fighter Command and in 1944 he moved to Headquarters Allied Expeditionary Air Force in preparation for Operation Overlord. He spent the closing stages of the War as Commandant of the Fighter Leaders' School and then as Commandant of the Central Fighter Establishment.

=== Post-war ===
After the War he was appointed Commandant of the Royal Air Force College Cranwell before becoming Chief of the Air Staff for the Royal Pakistani Air Force in 1949 and then Air Officer Commanding No. 12 Group in 1951. He went on to be Head of the RAF Staff in Washington D. C. in 1953 and Air Officer Commanding-in-Chief at Flying Training Command in 1955 before retiring in 1959.

In retirement he became Sales Director at Folland Aircraft Limited.

Military offices
Preceded by Walter Bryant	RAF College Commandant; 1946–1948	Succeeded by George Beamish
Preceded by Allan Perry-Keene	Commander-in-Chief, Royal Pakistan Air Force; 1949–1951	Succeeded by Leslie William Cannon
Preceded by Gilbert Harcourt-Smith	Air Officer Commanding No. 12 Group; 1951–1953	Succeeded by William Crisham
Preceded by Sir Lawrence Pendred	Air Officer Commanding-in-Chief Flying Training Command; 1955–1959	Succeeded by Sir Hugh Constantine
