= Shoreham, Kent =

Village and civil parish in England

Coordinates: 51.33242°N 0.17329°E

Shoreham
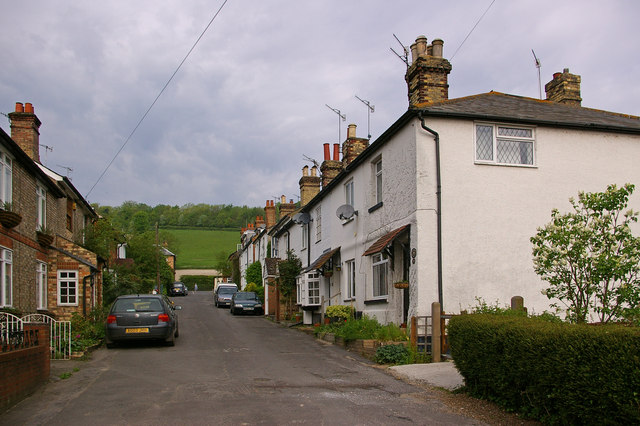
- Crown Road

- Location within Kent
- Population: 2,041 (2011 census)
- OS grid reference: TQ515615
- Civil parish: Shoreham
- District: Sevenoaks
- Shire county: Kent
- Region: South East
- Country: England
- Sovereign state: United Kingdom
- Post town: Sevenoaks
- Postcode district: TN14
- Dialling code: 01959
- Police: Kent
- Fire: Kent
- Ambulance: South East Coast
- UK Parliament: Sevenoaks

Shoreham is a village and civil parish in the Sevenoaks District of Kent, England. It is located 5.2 miles north of Sevenoaks.

The probable derivation of the name is estate at the foot of a steep slope. Steep slope was from the Saxon word scor. pronounced shor, but written sore by Norman scribes.

The village of Shoreham contains three traditional independent pubs: The Samuel Palmer (formally Ye Olde George Inn), The King's Arms and the Crown; with The Rising Sun in nearby Twitton.

== History ==
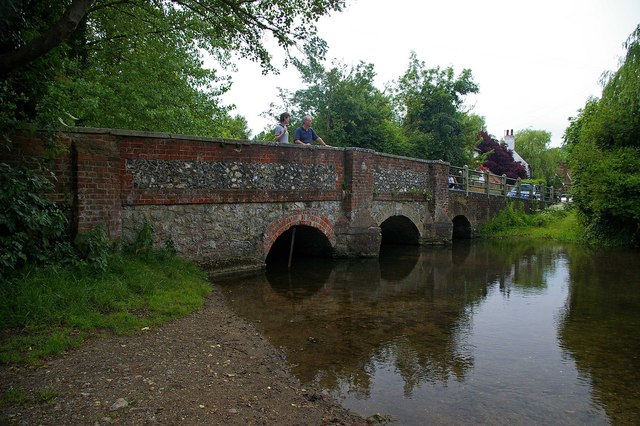
Shoreham bridge over the Darent

The Darent valley was one of the major areas of Stone Age settlement; Shoreham is not mentioned in the Domesday Book.

In 1668, cricket was mentioned in a court case as being played at Shoreham, one of the sport's earliest references.

It was also known as a smuggling area.

Shoreham was the most bombed parish in the United Kingdom during the Second World War. The reasons for this is not clear but more than likely a combination of several factors - the Army took over several manor houses for operational use, there was a dummy airfield situated nearby at Lullingstone designed specifically to fool the Luftwaffe, and Fort Halstead was also nearby. Quite often, bomber crews would jettison their bombs having missed their primary target or if they were intercepted by the RAF on the way to London.

Papermaking was once a local industry; the mill finally closed in 1928.

== War memorial ==
Shoreham was the birthplace and home of Private Thomas Highgate, who was the first British soldier to be shot for desertion during the First World War on 8 September 1914, following the Battle of and Retreat from Mons. In 2000, when the memorial was being refurbished, Shoreham Parish Council voted not to inscribe Highgate's name, although a space was left allowing for its inclusion at a later date. In 2006, a posthumous pardon led to some calls for Highgate's details to be added.

The war memorial is incomplete. It has been established that at least one of its fallen, George Arthur Rouse (brother of Percy Aslin, marked on the memorial, both sons of Harriet Rouse, as recorded in the 1901 census), is missing. One hundred years after he died, an effort to have George added was underway.

Opposite the church, and in a direct sight line from the war memorial, is the Shoreham Memorial Cross. The cross was cut into the chalk hillside in 1920 in remembrance of the men of Shoreham killed during the First World War. The cross is referenced in the inscription on the war memorial, which reads; ‘SHOREHAM/KENT/REMEMBER/AS YOU LOOK/AT/THE CROSS/ON THE HILL/THOSE/WHO GAVE/THEIR LIVES/FOR/THEIR COUNTRY/1914-1919’. The memorial is a Grade II listed structure. The Shoreham Cross was designated a Scheduled monument in October 2021.

== Shoreham Aircraft Museum ==
The official opening of the Shoreham Aircraft Museum in 1978 was attended by fifteen former Battle of Britain pilots. It pays lasting tribute to all those airmen who fought in the skies over southern England during World War II and houses a substantial collection of aviation relics excavated by the group over many years from sites of crashed British and German aircraft, as well as items which have been donated.

Run by local enthusiasts, the museum is largely funded by proceeds made by visitors whose donations contribute to the recovery and preservation of the artefacts. The Battle of Britain brought the village of Shoreham directly into the war when on 15 September 1940, a Dornier Do 17Z, part of a force of about 100 German bombers approaching London, was shot down shortly before noon. The invading formation had been challenged by nine RAF squadrons and the battle developed into a series of individual 'dogfights'. The unfortunate pilot of the Dornier was forced to land in a field at Castle Farm, with a Spitfire circling overhead, its cockpit canopy open, and its pilot waving a handkerchief, to signal a warning to the growing crowd of hop-pickers nearby to stay away until the Shoreham Home Guard arrived to recover the German crew. Feldwebel Heitsch, the pilot, and Feldwebel Pfeiffer, the observer, were taken to a nearby pub where they were bought a drink before being driven to Sevenoaks Police Station. The museum holds a collection of photographs of the Dornier, along with items taken from the wreckage at the time.

== Shoreham duck race ==
Shoreham duck race

The Duck Race is a long-running event in the village. It is held each year, on the May Day bank holiday. Entrants pay a small fee (usually £1) to enter their 'duck' into the race. The duck has to travel along the river Darent from the war memorial in the village, to the bridge before the old Mill. A 'duck' can be anything from a shop-bought rubber duck to a model made by the entrant(s). Actual ducks are forbidden. It is a large event in the village and several hundred people turn out each year to line the riverbanks and watch. Anyone can enter and there is a prize for the 'Best Duck in Show' (awarded before the race begins) and the 'First placed Duck.' The money raised goes towards charitable organisations in the village.

== Television ==
The Showdown kitchen featured in the BBC programme The Big Family Cooking Showdown is a converted barn in Shoreham.

== Notable events ==
On 29 September 1934, Airspeed Courier G-ACSY of London, Scottish & Provincial Airways Ltd crashed just north of Shoreham, at the bottom of Cockerhurst Road. The aircraft was on a scheduled international passenger flight from Paris to Croydon Airport and all four people on board were killed.

== Notable people ==
(in alphabetical order)

- Robert Ashington Bullen (1850–1912), a geologist and an authority on mollusca, was Vicar of Shoreham from 1888 to 1896.
- Verney Lovett Cameron (1844–1894), the first European to cross Equatorial Africa from coast to coast, is buried in the village's graveyard.
- Paul Chaloner (born 11 November 1971), a professional esports broadcast host also known as RedEye, lives in Shoreham.
- Robert Colgate was a farmer in Shoreham who sympathised with the French Revolution and emigrated to the United States, where his son William Colgate founded the Colgate company.
- Harold Copping (1863–1932), an illustrator of biblical scenes, lived for many years at The Studio in Shoreham and died there. He is buried in the churchyard of St. Peter and St. Paul in Shoreham.
- The writer Lord Dunsany (1878–1957) lived at Dunstall Priory here, served in the Shoreham Home Guard during the Second World War, and is buried in the churchyard with his wife.
- Thomas Highgate (1895–1914), soldier who fought in World War I, deserted and executed in 1914.
- The writer Shena Mackay was born in Edinburgh, but grew up in Shoreham.
- The artist Samuel Palmer (1805–1881) was born in London, but lived in the village from 1826 to 1835.
- The family of the writer Anthony Powell lived at Dunstall Priory during the Second World War and he visited them whenever he was able to take leave from his duties at the War Office.
- Joseph Prestwich, a geologist, lived in Shoreham until his death in 1896.
- William Wall (1647–1728), theologian that lived in Shoreham.
- Naomi Watts (1968–), actress born in Shoreham.
- John Wesley (1703–1791) was a friend of Vincent Perronet, then Vicar of Shoreham, and often preached in the church.
- Franklin White (1892–1975), a painter, owned the Samuel Palmer School of Fine Arts in Church Street, Shoreham.
- Franklin White (1923–2013), a ballet dancer, also lived in the village.

== Transport ==
=== Rail ===
Shoreham station connects the village with Thameslink services to London Blackfriars via Bromley South and Catford and to Sevenoaks.

=== Buses ===
Shoreham is served by Go-Coach route 2, connecting it with Sevenoaks and Swanley.

== See also ==
- Listed buildings in Shoreham, Kent

== Bibliography ==
- Underdown, David (2000). Start of Play. Allen Lane.
- Joe's Walks for Bad Map-Readers – 13 Country Walks around London, by Joe Alexander with illustrations by Joy Paul (Roxburghe Publishing, 1992, ISBN 0-9519402-0-1)
