= Central Fighter Establishment =

Central Fighter Establishment
- Active: 16 October 1944 - 1 February 1966
- Country: United Kingdom
- Branch: Royal Air Force
- Part of: No. 12 Group RAF; No. 11 Group RAF
- Last base: RAF Binbrook

The Central Fighter Establishment was a Royal Air Force formation that dealt with the development of fighter aircraft tactics which was formed on 4 September 1944 as a nucleus at RAF Tangmere. It also tested new fighter aircraft and equipment, and with the training of squadron and flight commanders. It was officially formed on 16 October 1944 at RAF Wittering as part of No. 12 Group RAF, and was disbanded on 1 February 1966 while at RAF Binbrook.

== Airfields used ==
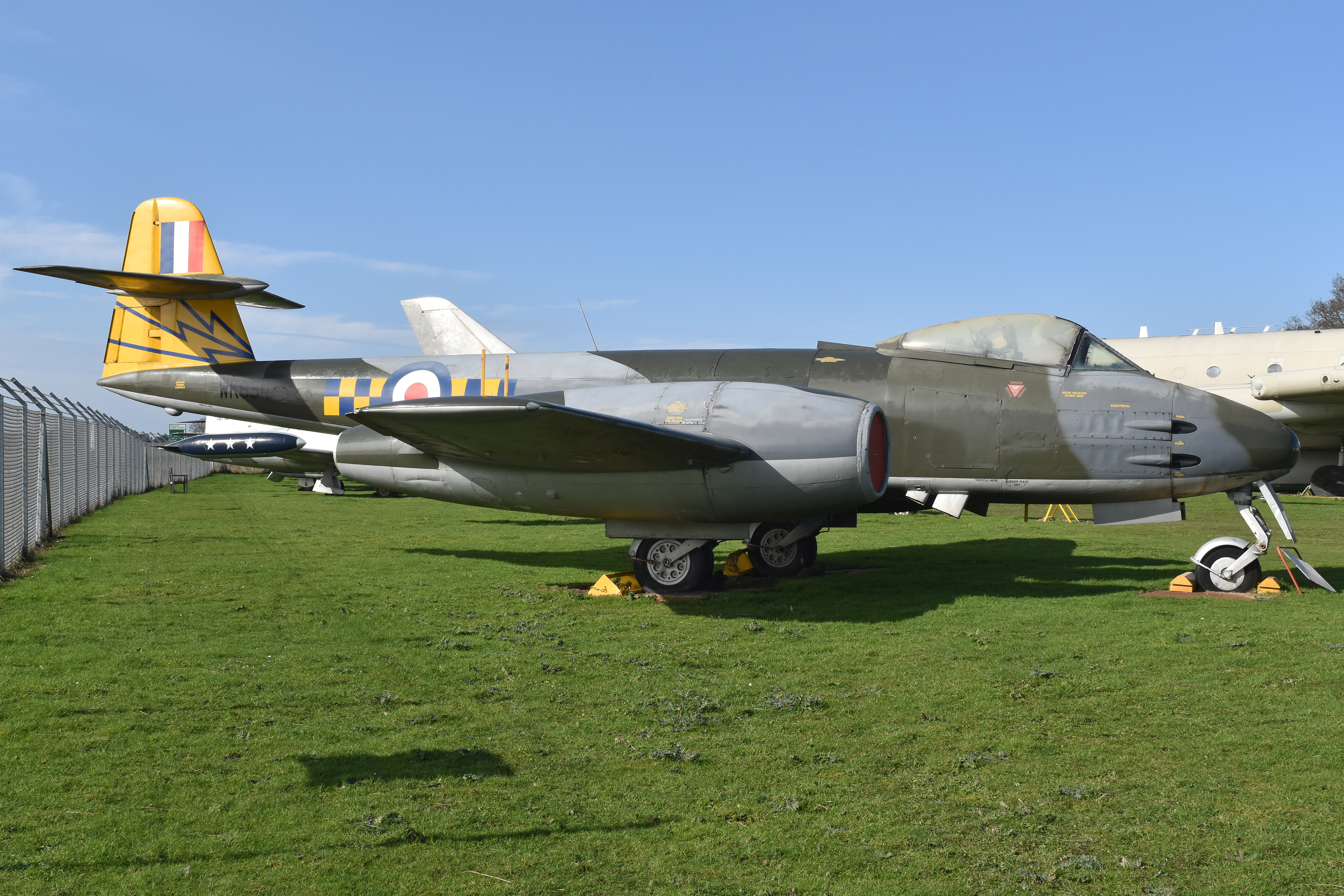
Meteor WK654, operated by the All-Weather Development Squadron as part of the CFE, now in museum hands

| Date | Place | Notes |
|---|---|---|
| 4 September 1944 | RAF Tangmere | Nucleus formed |
| 16 October 1944 | RAF Wittering | Officially formed |
| 27 February 1945 | Tangmere | |
| 1 October 1945 | RAF West Raynham | |
| 12 October 1962 | RAF Binbrook | |
| 1 February 1966 | Binbrook | Disbanded |

== Units ==
All except where noted:

- Air Fighting Development Squadron formed 1 October 1944 at Wittering. Previously Air Fighting Development Unit. Disbanded 1 February 1966 at Binbrook and became the Fighter Command Trials Unit.
- Air Support Development Squadron
- All-Weather Development Squadron formed at 1 February 1956 at West Raynham. Previously All-Weather Wing. Disbanded during August 1959 at West Raynham and absorbed by the Air Fighting Development Squadron. Operated Gloster Meteors and Gloster Javelins.
- All-Weather Fighter Combat School formed 15 March 1958 at West Raynham. Previously All-Weather Fighter Leaders School. Disbanded 1 July 1962 at West Raynham and became the Javelin Operational Conversion Squadron.
- All-Weather Fighter Leaders School from July 1950 at West Raynham as part of the Fighter Combat School. Previously Night Fighter Leaders School. Disbanded 15 March 1958 at West Raynham became the All-Weather Fighter Combat School.
- All-Weather Wing formed 3 July 1950 at West Raynham. Previously Night Fighter Wing. Disbanded during February 1956 at West Raynham and became the All-Weather Development Squadron.
- Day Fighter Combat Squadron formed on 15 March 1958 at West Raynham within the Fighter Combat School. Disbanded on 1 November 1965 at Binbrook.
- Day Fighter Development Wing joined CFE on 27 December 1944 at Wittering.
- Day Fighter Leaders School formed 27 December 1944 at Wittering. Previously Fighter Leaders School. Became 15 March 1958 at West Raynham and became the Day Fighter Combat Squadron.
- Day Fighter Training Squadron
- Enemy Aircraft Flight operated between 17 January 1945 and December 1945 at Tangmere. It was previously No. 1426 (Enemy Aircraft) Flight RAF.
- Fighter/Bomber Training Squadron
- Fighter Combat School formed on 15 March 1958 at West Raynham. Consisted of Day Fighter Combat Squadron and All-Weather Fighter Combat School. Disbanded.
- Fighter Command Instrument Rating Flight formed during February 1956 at West Raynham. Previously Fighter Command Instrument Training Squadron. Disbanded 1 January 1960 at West Raynham and became the Fighter Command Instrument Rating Squadron.
- Fighter Command Instrument Rating Squadron formed on 1 January 1960 at West Raynham. Previously Fighter Command Instrument Rating Flight. Disbanded on 1 June 1963 at Middleton St. George and merged with the Lightning Conversion Squadron to become No. 226 Operational Conversion Unit RAF.
- Fighter Command Instrument Training Flight formed on 13 September 1948 at Tangmere. Joined CFE on 20 February 1950 while at West Raynham. Disbanded on 1 December 1951 at West Raynham and became the Fighter Command Instrument Training Squadron
- Fighter Command Instrument Training Squadron formed on 1 December 1951 at West Raynham. Joined CFE on 1 December 1952. Previously Fighter Command Instrument Training Flight. Disbanded February 1956 at West Raynham and became the Fighter Command Instrument Rating Flight.
- Fighter Command Target Facilities Squadron formed at 3 August 1961 at Leeming. Previously part of No. 228 Operational Conversion Unit RAF. Joined CFE on 10 August 1961 at West Raynham. Disbanded on 1 April 1963 at West Raynham and became No. 85 Squadron RAF.
- Fighter Experimental Flight (1944-46)
- Fighter Interception Development Squadron (Ford 1944-50) became Radar Interception Development Squadron
- Fighter Leaders School (1944-?)
- Fighter Support Development Squadron (1951-??)
- Fighter Support Development Unit (1951) became Fighter Support Development Squadron
- Fighter Weapons School (1955-1958 as part of the Central Gunnery School) (1958-)
- Javelin Operational Conversion Squadron (1962)
- Lightning Conversion Squadron (1960-62)
- Naval Air Fighting Development Squadron (1945-56)
- Night All-Weather Wing (1957-??)
- Night Fighter Development Wing at Ford (1944-49) became Night Fighter Wing
- Night Fighter Leaders School (1945-50) became All-Weather Fighter Leaders School
- Night Fighter Training Squadron (1945) became Night Fighter Leaders School
- Night Fighter Wing (1949-50) became All-Weather Wing
- Radar Interception Development Squadron (1950-53)

== Commandant ==
Commanding Officers and the years they held this appointment
| Year(s) | Name |
|---|---|
| 1945 | Air Commodore Richard Atcherley |
| 1945–1948 | Unknown |
| 1948–1950 | Air Commodore David Atcherley |
| 1950–1953 | Air Commodore W J Crisham |
| 1953–1954 | Air Commodore Geoffrey D Stephenson |
| 1954–1957 | Air Commodore John Grandy |
| 1957–1958 | Air Commodore E L Colbeck-Welch |
| 1958–1962 | Air Commodore Hughie Edwards |
| 1962–1964 | Air Commodore Geoffrey Millington |
| 1964–1966 | Air Commodore Ernest Tacon |
