= David Atcherley =

Royal Air Force air vice marshal (1904–1952)

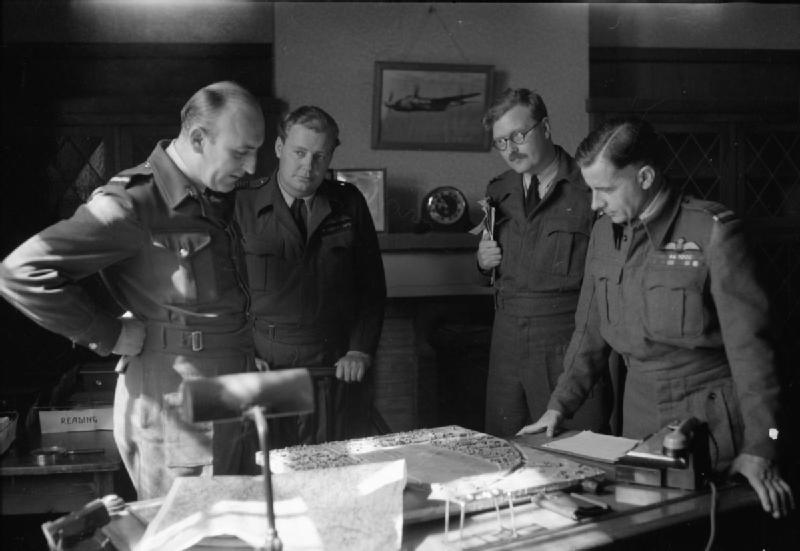
- Air Vice Marshal Basil Embry (right) and his staff, c. 1944. Atcherley is at left.
- Born: David Francis William Atcherley; 12 January 1904; York, England
- Died: 8 June 1952 (aged 48); Mediterranean Sea
- Relatives: Air Marshal Sir Richard Atcherley (brother)
- Military career
- Allegiance: United Kingdom
- Branch: British Army (1922–1929); Royal Air Force (1929–1952)
- Service years: 1922–1952
- Rank: Air Vice Marshal
- Service number: 05168
- Commands: No. 205 Group (1952); Central Fighter Establishment (1948–1950); No. 47 Group (1946); No. 48 Group (1945–1946); No. 323 Wing (1943); No. 325 Wing (1942–1943); RAF Fairwood Common (1942); No. 57 Operational Training Unit (1941–1942); No. 25 Squadron (1941); RAF Castletown (1940–1941); No. 253 Squadron (1940); No. 85 Squadron (1938–1940)
- Conflicts: Second World War
- Awards: Companion of the Order of the Bath; Commander of the Order of the British Empire; Distinguished Service Order; Distinguished Flying Cross; Mentioned in Despatches (3); Grand Officer of the Order of Leopold II (Belgium); Croix de guerre (Belgium)

Air Vice Marshal David Francis William Atcherley, CB, CBE, DSO, DFC (12 January 1904 – 8 June 1952) was a senior Royal Air Force officer.

== Early life ==
David Atcherley and his twin Richard were born on 12 January 1904, and were the sons of Major General Sir Llewellyn Atcherley, Chief Constable of the West Riding of Yorkshire, and his wife "Nellie", Eleanor Frances (1871–1957), daughter of Richard Mickelthwait, of Ardsley House, in the valley of Deane near Barnsley. Atcherley and his brother were first cousins of William Empson. They both attended Oundle School in Northamptonshire.

== Military career and service in the Second World War ==
Atcherley entered Sandhurst Military Academy in 1922. In 1924 he was commissioned into the East Lancashire Regiment.

He then became an aircraft pilot and transferred to the Royal Air Force (RAF). At the start of the war he was Commanding Officer of No. 85 Squadron. He commanded No. 253 Squadron in May 1940.

Atcherley became the Commanding Officer at RAF Fairwood Common in 1942 and was responsible for collecting Oberleutnant Armin Faber from RAF Pembrey when he landed his Focke-Wulf Fw 190 there on 23 June 1942.

Towards the end of the war he served as senior air staff officer in No. 2 Group.

== Disappearance and presumed death ==
In June 1952, Atcherley was lost at sea, presumed dead whilst piloting a Meteor jet fighter PR Mk.10 (from No. 13 Squadron). He took off from RAF Kabrit in Egypt at approximately 11.30 am for a 40-minute flight to Nicosia in Cyprus. His aircraft never arrived at Nicosia, and no radio message was received. No trace of Atcherley or his aircraft was ever found despite an extensive air-sea search being carried out by British, Israeli, Turkish and American aircraft.

== Honours and awards ==
- 29 July 1941 – Distinguished Flying Cross – Wing Commander David Francis William Atcherley, Royal Air Force.

This officer has carried out a large amount of operational flying at night, sometimes under adverse weather conditions. The efficiency of his squadron and the success it has had is due to Wing Commander Atcherley's drive, energy and leadership. He has destroyed three enemy aircraft at night.

— London Gazette

- 14 July 1944 – Distinguished Service Order – Acting Air Commodore David Francis William Atcherley, Royal Air Force.

This officer has completed much operational flying and has achieved notable successes. He is a fearless leader, whose iron determination and unswerving devotion to duty have inspired all under his command. In addition to his work in the air Air Commodore Atcherley has displayed a high standard of organising ability and great drive and his services have been of inestimable value.

— London Gazette

== See also ==
- List of people who disappeared mysteriously at sea
