= Shoreham Aircraft Museum =

Museum in Kent, England

Coordinates: 51°20′02″N 0°10′39″E

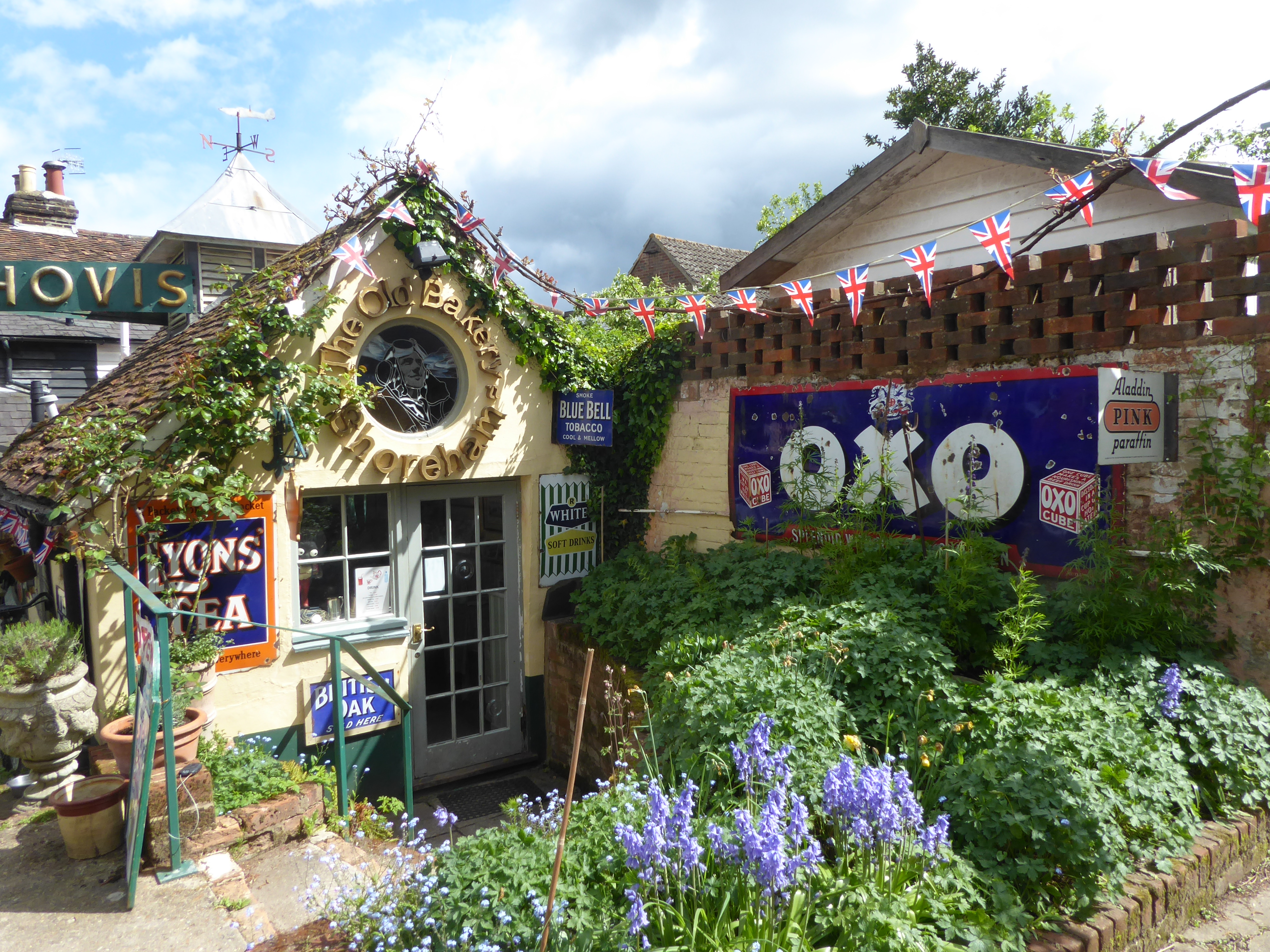
The "Old Bakery" tearoom at the museum

The Shoreham Aircraft Museum is located in the village of Shoreham near Sevenoaks in Kent, England, on the south-east edge of Greater London. It was founded by volunteers in 1978 and is dedicated to the airmen who fought in the skies over southern England during the Second World War.

The museum houses aviation relics excavated by the Shoreham Aircraft Preservation Society over 30 years. These relics come from crashed RAF and Luftwaffe aircraft and are displayed alongside personal accounts of those involved. A particular focus is the Battle of Britain period.

Many aircraft types are represented in the collection, including recovered engine examples from the following:

- Supermarine Spitfire
- Hawker Hurricane
- Bf 109
- Dornier Do 17
- Fw 190
- Junkers Ju 88

The museum has collections of flying helmets, uniforms, insignia and Home Front memorabilia, along with photos and other items which have been donated by ex-pilots and private individuals. The museum also holds a collection of original paintings and prints by the aviation artist Geoff Nutkins. Other examples of his work can be seen at the RAF College in Cranwell, the Royal Air Force Museum at Hendon and the RAF Club in Piccadilly, London.

There is also a tearoom and garden serving cream teas and homemade cakes. The museum is open from 10am to 5pm on Saturdays, Sundays and Bank Holiday Mondays from Easter until the end of October each year. The tearoom and garden only is also open on Saturdays and is free to enter.

All current and ex-military service personnel can enter the museum free of charge.
