= Bombenzielanlage =

German aircraft bomb aiming computer

The Bombenzielanlage ("Bomb Target System") (BZA), also known as the Bomb Ziel Automat, was a German World War II bombsight analog computer designed to calculate the precise release of bombs during dive-bombing. It was fitted to a number of aircraft types, such as the Junkers Ju 88 and the Arado Ar 234. The unit controlled an aiming mark on sight in front of the pilot. The computer assessed the angle of dive, aircraft track, and altitude. The operator set other variables, such as barometric pressure, target altitude, airspeed and wind speed. During operation, the bomb(s) were released when an aiming mark coincided with the target.
