= List of Yakovlev aircraft =

This is a list of aircraft produced by Yakovlev, a Soviet/Russian aircraft manufacturer.

== Aircraft ==
=== Early aircraft ===
- AVF-10 (1924 - glider)
- AVF-20 (1925 - glider)
- AVF-34 (1926 - glider)
- AIR-1/VVA-3/Ya-1 (1927 - biplane trainer)
- AIR-2/Ya-2 (1928 - biplane trainer, improved AIR-1)
- AIR-3/Ya-3 (1929 - general aviation monoplane developed from the AIR-2)
- AIR-4/Ya-4 (1930 - improved AIR-3)
- AIR-5 (1931 - cabin monoplane)
- AIR-6/VVA-5/Ya-6 (1932 - light utility aircraft)
- AIR-7/Ya-7 (1932 - high speed trainer/record-setting)
- AIR-8 (1934 - trainer version of AIR-3)
- AIR-9 (1935 - trainer/record-setting)
- AIR-10/Ya-10 (1934 - precursor of UT-2)
- AIR-11/LT-1 (1936 - three-seat touring aircraft)
- AIR-12 (1936 - long-range record setting aircraft)
- AIR-13 (1936 - long-range racing aircraft)
- AIR-14 (1936 - prototype for UT-1)
- AIR-15/UT-15 (1938 - racing aircraft)
- AIR-16/LT-2 (1936 - prototype 4-seat version of AIR-10)
- AIR-17/UT-3 (1937 - prototype 3-seat crew trainer)
- AIR-18 (1937 - single-seat racing aircraft based on the UT-1)
- AIR-19/Ya-19 (1939 - prototype light transport based on the UT-3)
- UT-1 (1936 - single-seat trainer)
- UT-2 "Mink" (1937 - 2-seat trainer)
- Ya-20 (1937 - prototype for UT-2)
- Ya-21 (1936 - prototype racing aircraft)
- Ya-21/UT-21 (1938 - prototype single-seat fighter-trainer based on the UT-1)
- Ya-22/I-29/BB-22 (1939 - multi role combat aircraft prototype)
- Ya-23/UT-23 (1938 - prototype reconnaissance trainer based on UT-2)
- Ya-23 (1939 - prototype for Yak-4)

=== Bombers ===
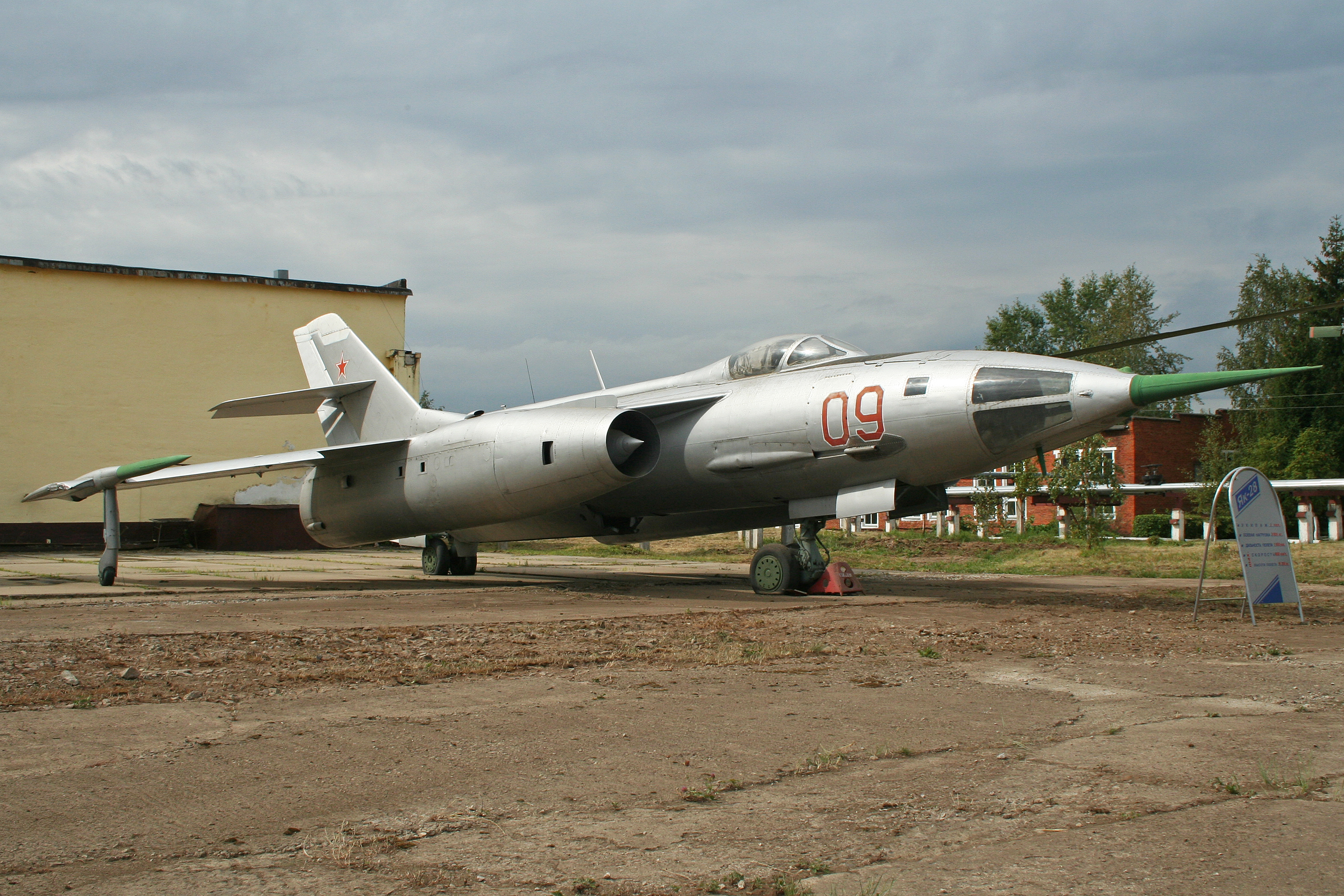
Yak-28L tactical bomber

- Yak-2 (1940 - World War II bomber)
- Yak-4/BB-22 (1941 - World War II bomber, improved Yak-2)
- Yak-28 "Brewer" (1958 - multi-role bomber)
  - Yak-28P "Firebar" (1961 - long-range interceptor version of the Yak-28)

=== Fighters ===
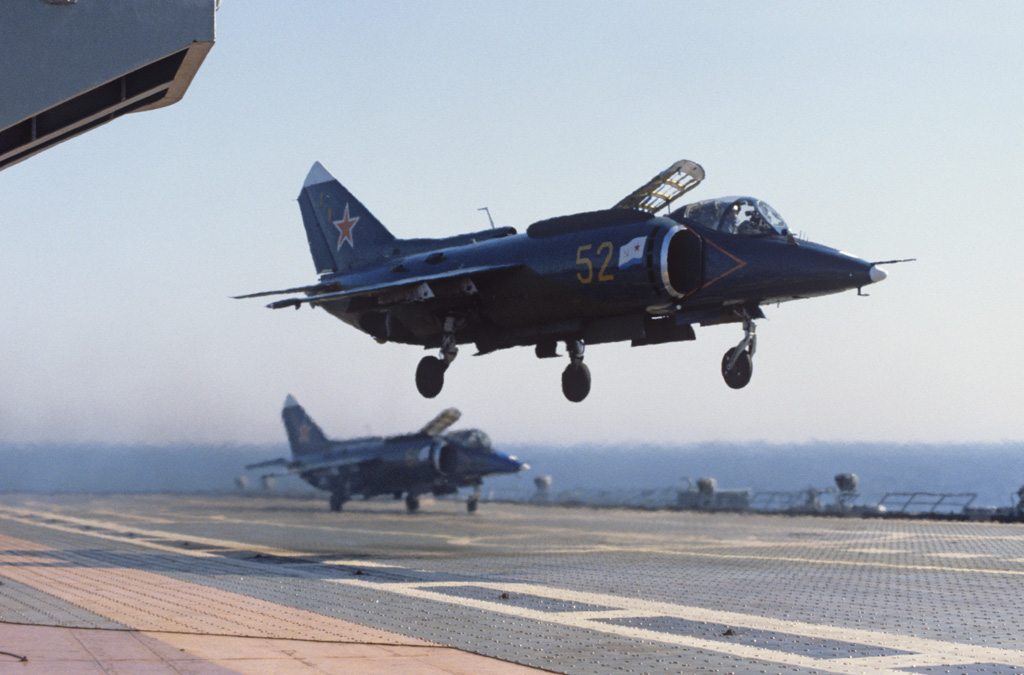
Yak-38 fighter aircraft of Soviet aircraft carrier Novorossiysk

- Yak-1 (1940 - World War II fighter)
- Yak-3 (1943 - World War II fighter)
- Yak-7 "Mark" (1941 - World War II single-seat fighter)
- Yak-9 "Frank" (1942 - World War II fighter/bomber, improved Yak-7DI)
- Yak-15 "Feather" (1946 - first successful Soviet jet fighter, developed from Yak-3U)
- Yak-17 "Feather" (1947 - jet fighter, improved Yak-15)
- Yak-23 "Flora" (1948 - fighter, development of Yak-15/Yak-17)
- Yak-25 "Flashlight" (1954 - interceptor)
- Yak-38 "Forger" (1975 - V/STOL shipborne fighter)

=== Trainers ===
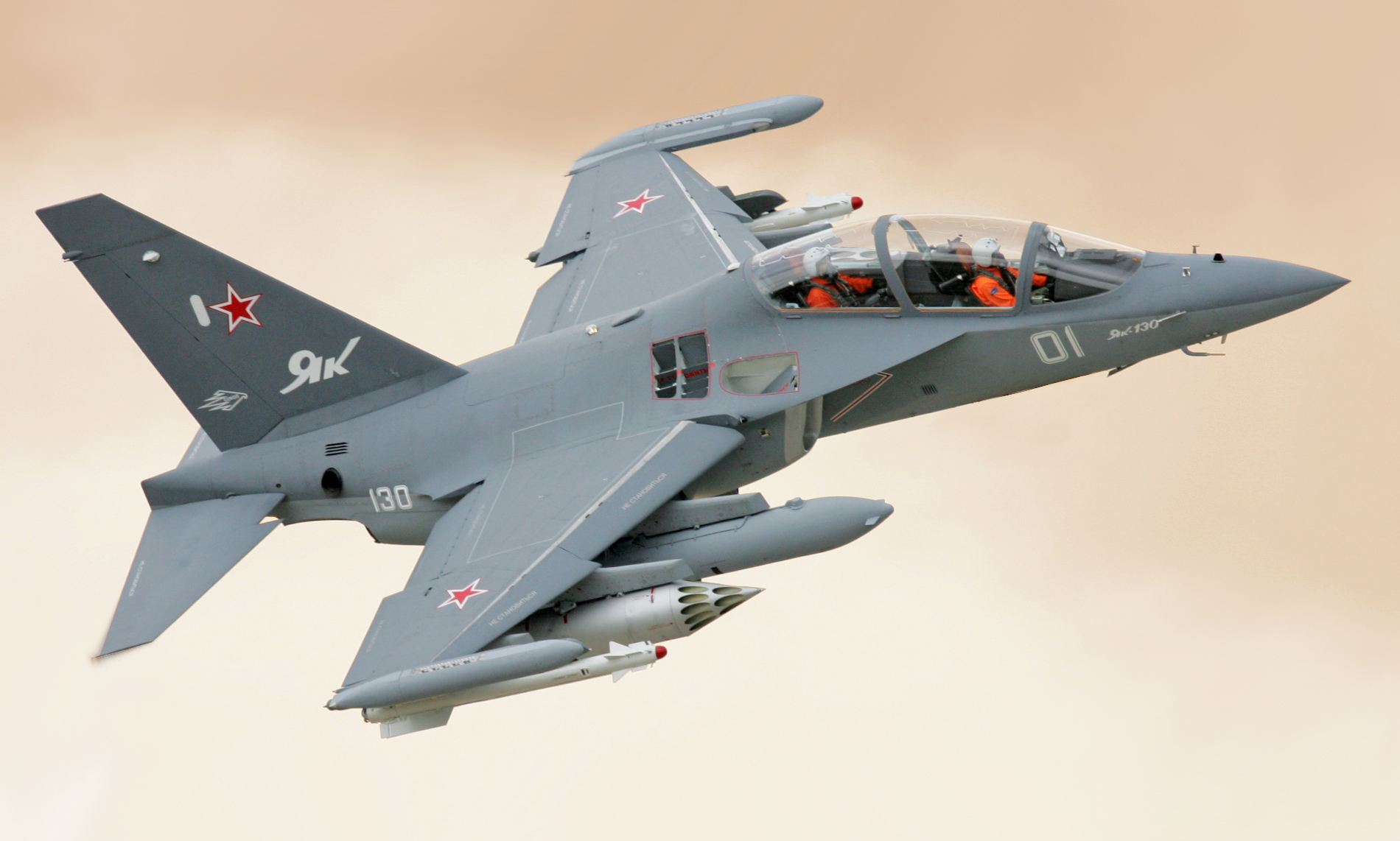
Yak-130

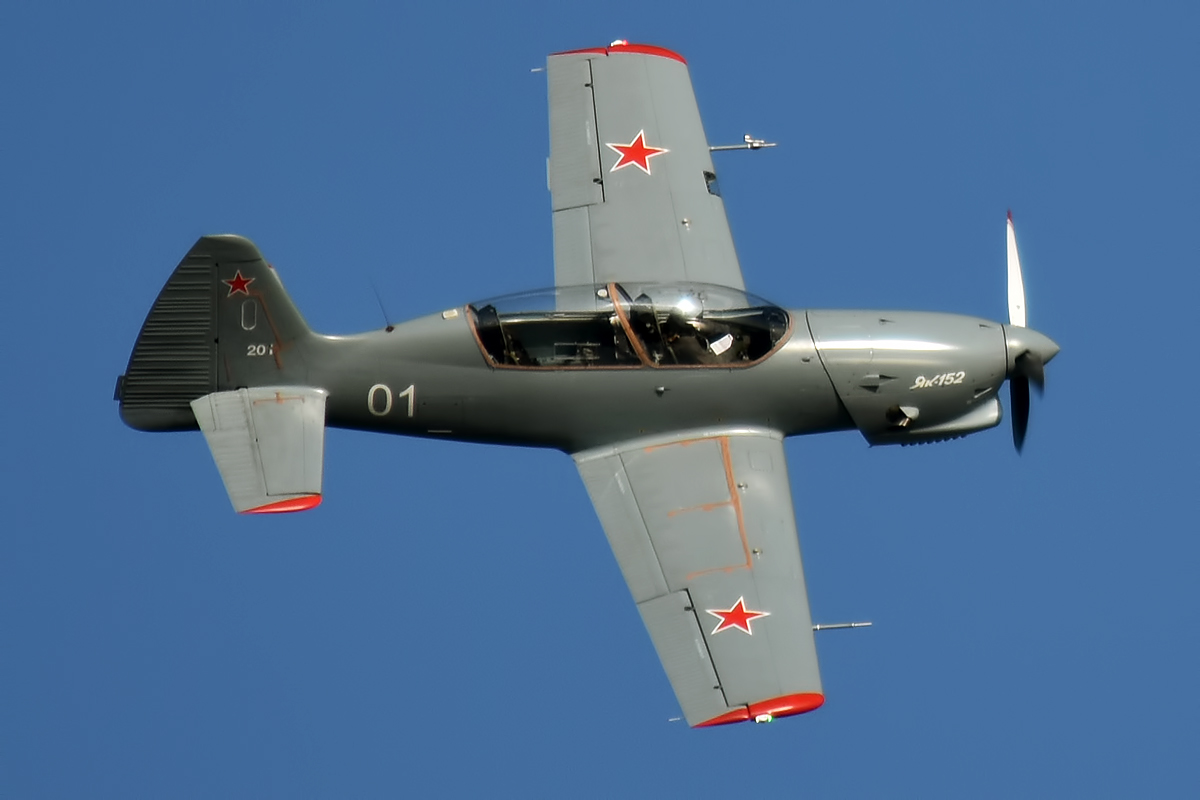
Yak-152

- Yak-7 "Mark" (1941 - World War II 2-seat trainer)
- Yak-11 "Moose" (1946 - trainer, developed from Yak-3)
- Yak-17V/Yak-17UTI "Magnet" (1948 - trainer version of Yak-17)
- Yak-18 "Max" (1946 - tandem two-seat military primary trainer)
- Yak-18T (1967 - 4- or 5-seat civilian primary trainer)
- Yak-20 (1950 - trainer)
- Yak-21 (1947 - prototype trainer)
- Yak-28U "Maestro" (1962 - trainer version of the Yak-28)
- Yak-30 "Magnum" (1960 - trainer prototype, designation reused)
- Yak-32 "Mantis" (1960 - trainer, single-seat version of Yak-30)
- Yak-50 (1975 - aerobatic)
- Yak-52 (1976 - aerobatic and military primary trainer)
- Yak-54 (1994 - aerobatic, developed from the Yak-55M)
- Yak-55 (1981 - aerobatic)
- Yak-130 "Mitten" (1992 - lead-in fighter trainer / light combat aircraft)
- Yak-152 (2016 - military primary trainer)
- Yak-200 (1953 - multi-engined trainer)
- Yak-210 (1953 - multi-engined navigator trainer developed from the Yak-200)

=== Airliners, transport and utility aircraft ===
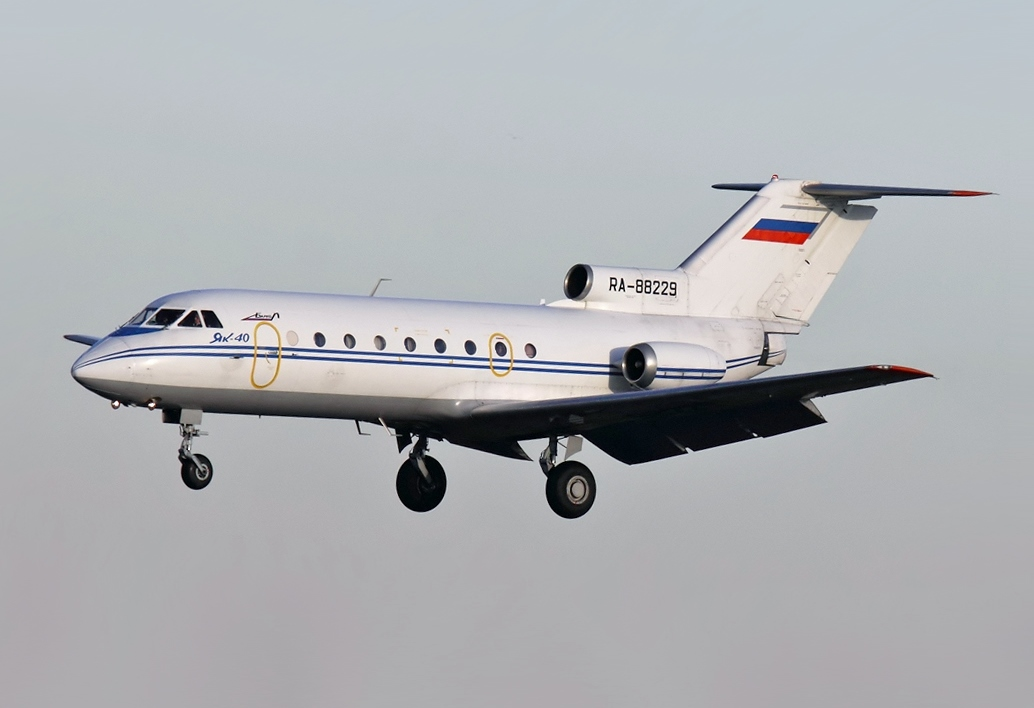
Yak-40

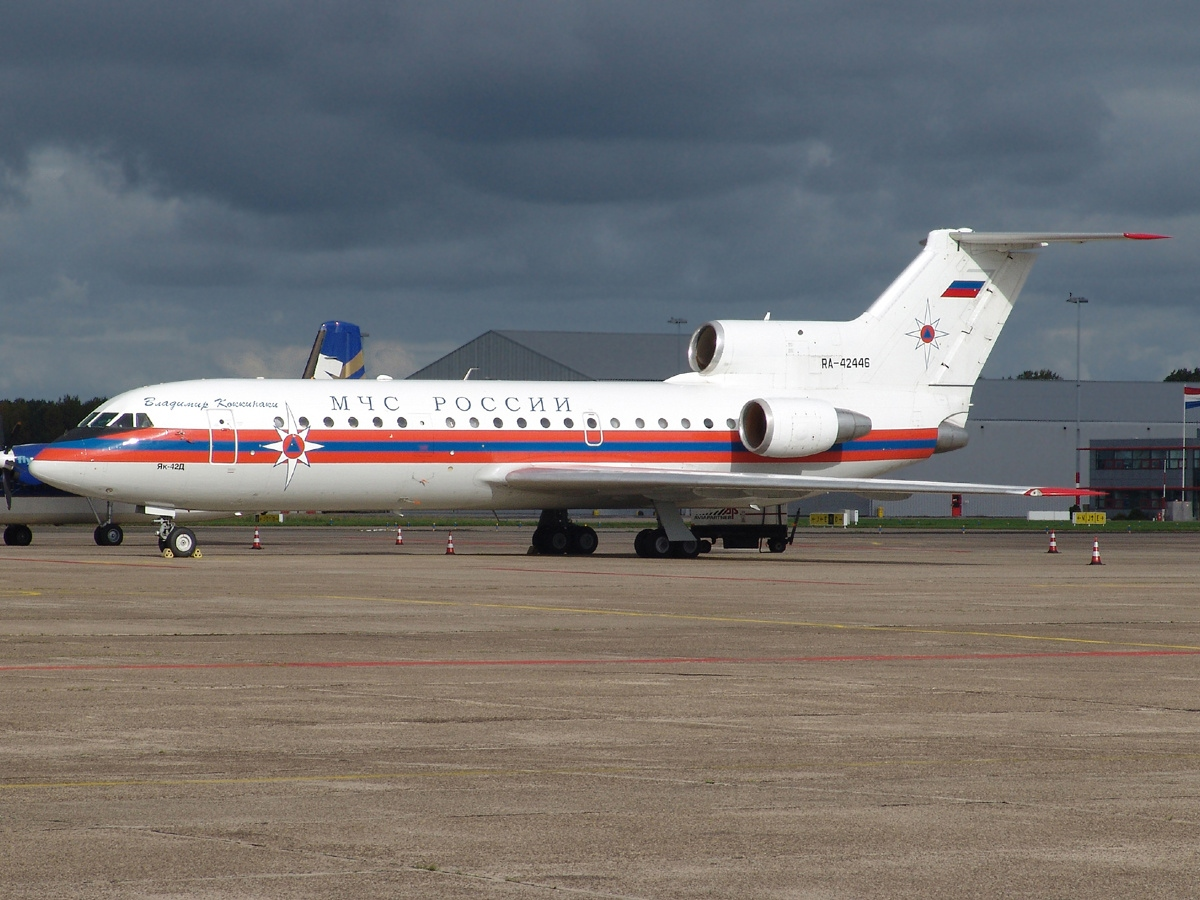
Yak-42

- Yak-6/NBB (1942 - military transport/night bomber)
- Yak-10 "Crow" (1945 - liaison, commuter transport)
- Yak-12 "Creek" (1946 - liaison, general purpose utility)
- Yak-14 "Mare" (1948 - military transport glider)
- Yak-18T (1967 - 4 seat aerobatic trainer/utility)
- Yak-40 "Codling" (1966 - commercial passenger)
- Yak-42 "Clobber" (1975 - commercial passenger, developed from Yak-40)
- Yak-58 (1993 - light utility)
- Yak-112 (1993 - light general purpose utility)

=== Reconnaissance ===
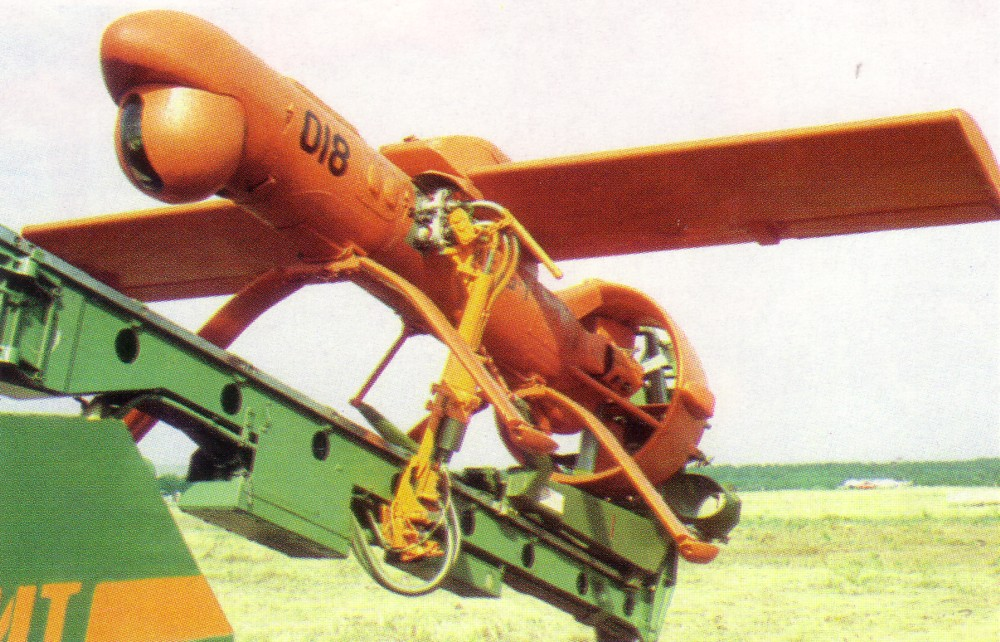
Pchela UAV

- Yakovlev R-12 (1940 - prototype photographic reconnaissance aircraft based on the Yak-2)
- Yak-27 "Flashlight" and "Mangrove" (1958 - fighter/reconnaissance)
- Yakovlev Pchela (1990s - unmanned reconnaissance aircraft)

=== Helicopters ===
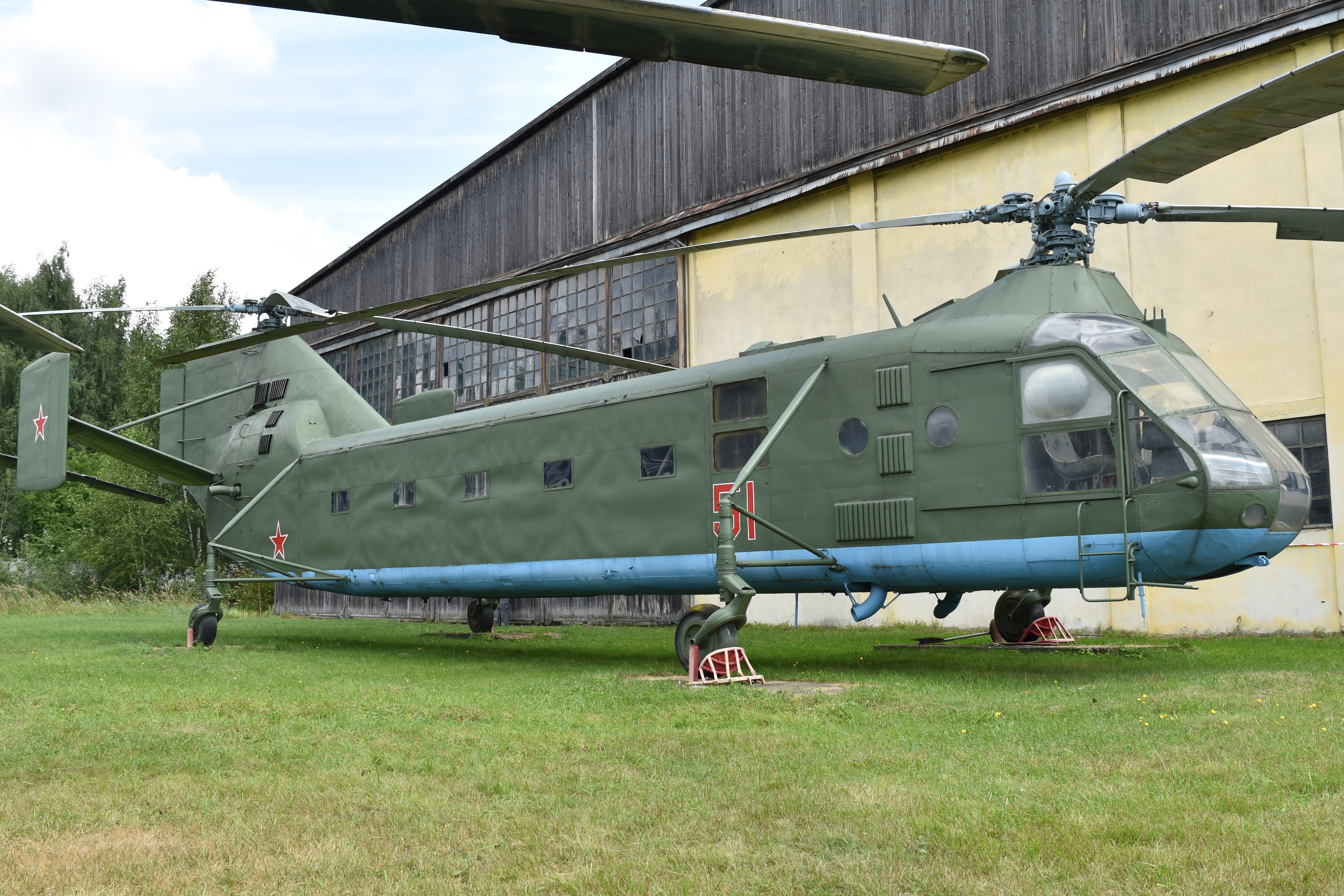
Yak-24U

- Yak-24 "Horse" (1952 - transport helicopter)

=== Planned aircraft ===
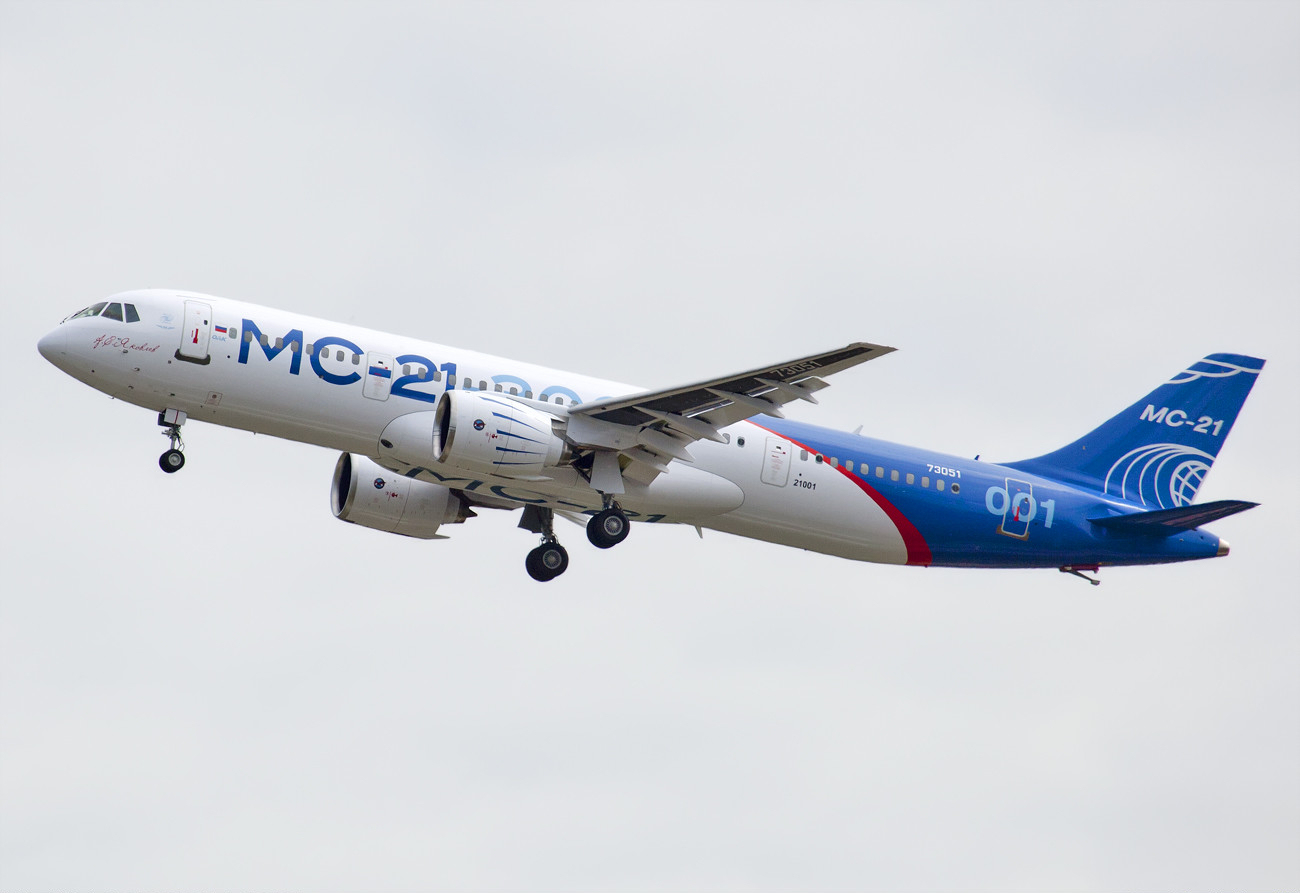
Maiden flight of MC-21

- Irkut MC-21 (proposed short- and medium-range airliner)

=== Experimental ===
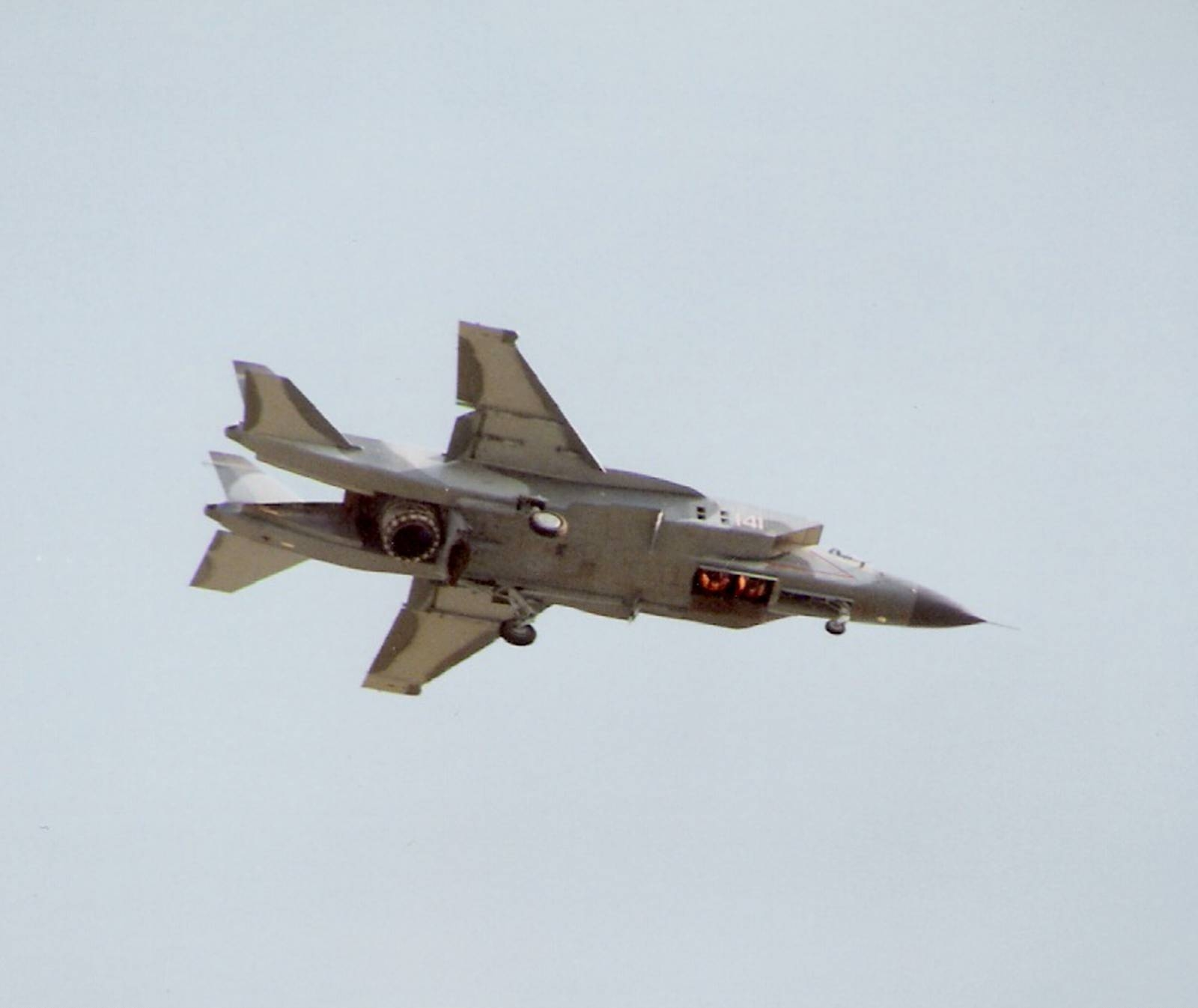
Yak-141 VTOL fighter during hover at 1992 Farnborough Airshow

- VVP-6 (experimental VTOL transport and weapons platform)
- Yak-3/I-26U/I-30 (1941 - World War II fighter prototype)
- Yak-5/I-28 (1940 - World War II fighter-trainer prototype)
- Yak-8 "Crib" (1944 - prototype utility aircraft, improved Yak-6)
- Yak-13 (1945 - improved Yak-10, prototype only)
- Yak-16 "Cork" (1948 - light civilian transport)
- Yak-19 (1947 - prototype jet fighter)
- Yak-25 (1947 - fighter prototype, designation reused)
- Yak-26 "Flashlight" (1955 - tactical bomber, developed from Yak-25)
- Yak-30 (1948 - fighter prototype, development of Yak-25)
- Yak-33 (early 1960s - V/STOL fighter, bomber, reconnaissance aircraft project)
- Yak-36 "Freehand" (1963 - VTOL demonstration aircraft)
- Yak-43 (1983 - projected replacement for VTOL Yak-141 fighter)
- Yak-44 (1980s - carrier-capable airborne early warning)
- Yak-45 (1973 - failed air superiority fighter design)
- Yak-46 (1990s - failed push prop design developed from the Yak-42)
- Yak-48 (1998 - projected medium civilian transport)
- Yak-50 (1949 - fighter prototype, development of Yak-30, designation reused)
- Yak-53 (1982 - aerobatic trainer prototype, single-seat version of Yak-52)
- Yak-60 (late 1960s - tandem-rotor heavy-lift helicopter design)
- Yak-77 (1993 - projected medium twin-engine business and/or regional commuter airliner)
- Yak-100/Yak-22 (1948 - projected transport helicopter design, initially named as Yak-22)
- Yak-140 (1954 - experimental fighter aircraft; cancelled in favor of the MiG-21)
- Yak-141/Yak-41 "Freestyle" (1987 - prototype supersonic VTOL fighter, initially named as Yak-41)
- Yak-201 (Fifth-generation VTOL aircraft intended for the Russian Navy in the 1990s)
- Yak-220 (projected transport aircraft based on the Yak-200)
- Yak-1000 (1951 - high-speed experimental aircraft)
- Yak-EG (1947 - experimental helicopter)

=== International aircraft projects ===
- Gulfstream G200 (withdrew in 1995)
- Hongdu Yakovlev CJ-7
