= List of Soviet aircraft in World War II =

== Fighters ==
Aircraft	Engine	Top speed	Range	Ceiling	Armament		
Aircraft	Engine	Top speed	Range	Ceiling	7.62 mm /.30-cal.	12.7 mm /.50-cal.	Cannon
Bell P-39 Airacobra (United States)	Inline V-12: Allison	389 mph	525 mi	35,000 ft		4	1 × 37 mm
Bell P-63 Kingcobra (United States)	Inline V-12: Allison	410 mph	450 mi	43,000 ft		4	1 × 37mm
Curtiss P-40 Warhawk (United States)	Inline V-12: Allison	345 mph	800 mi	29,100 ft	4	2	
Hawker Hurricane (United Kingdom)	Inline V-12: Rolls-Royce	328 mph	465 mi	35,600 ft	12		
Lavochkin-Gorbunov-Gudkov LaGG-1	Inline V-12: Klimov	376 mph	345 mi	31,490 ft		2	1 × 23mm
Lavochkin-Gorbunov-Gudkov LaGG-3	Inline V-12: Klimov	366 mph	620 mi	31,800 ft		2	1 × 20mm
Lavochkin La-5	Radial 14-cyl: Shvetsov	403 mph	475 mi	36,000 ft			
Lavochkin La-7	Radial 14-cyl: Shvetsov	411 mph	395 mi	34,280 ft			
Mikoyan-Gurevich MiG-1	Inline V-12: Mikulin	408 mph	360 mi	39,000 ft	2	1	
Mikoyan-Gurevich MiG-3	Inline V-12: Mikulin	400 mph	510 mi	39,000 ft	2	1	
Petlyakov Pe-3	Inline V-12 × 2: Klimov	330 mph	1336 mi	29,900 ft	1	3	1 × 20mm
Polikarpov I-15 biplane	Radial 9-cyl: Shvetsov	228 mph	320 mi	32,200 ft	4		
Polikarpov I-153 biplane	Radial 9-cyl: Shvetsov	185 mph	290 mi	35,100 ft	4		
Polikarpov I-16	Radial 9-cyl: Shvetsov	288 mph	497 mi	31,800 ft	2		2 × 20mm
Polikarpov I-185	Radial 18-cyl: Shvetsov	390 mph	519 mi	36,000 ft			3 × 20mm
Republic P-47 Thunderbolt (United States)	Radial 18-cyl: Pratt & Whitney	426 mph	1030 mi	42,000 ft		8	
Supermarine Spitfire (United Kingdom)	Inline V-12: Rolls-Royce	408 mph	434 mi	43,000 ft		4	2
Yakovlev Yak-1	Inline V-12: Klimov	348 mph	430 mi	32,500 ft	2		1 × 20mm
Yakovlev Yak-3	Inline V-12: Klimov	401 mph	340 mi	34,100 ft		2	1 × 20mm
Yakovlev Yak-7	Inline V-12: Klimov	308 mph	400 mi	31,200 ft		2	1 × 20mm
Yakovlev Yak-9	Inline V-12: Klimov	371 mph	870 mi	32,750 ft		1	1 × 37mm

== Bomber and Attack Aircraft ==
Aircraft	Engine	Top speed	Range	Ceiling	Bombload	Armament		
Aircraft	Engine	Top speed	Range	Ceiling	Bombload	7.62mm /.30-cal.	12.7mm /.50-cal.	Cannon
Arkhangelsky Ar-2	Inline V-12 × 2: Klimov	313 mph	621 mi	34,400 ft	1500 kg			
De Havilland Mosquito (United Kingdom)		mph	mi	ft	kg			
Douglas A-20 Havoc (United States)	Radial xx-cyl. × 2: Wright	350 mph	945 mi	28,600 ft	1089 kg			
Handley Page Hampden (United Kingdom)	Radial 9-cyl. × 2: Bristol	247 mph	1720 mi	19,000 ft	1800 kg			
Ilyushin DB-3	Radial 9-cyl. × 2: Nazarov	273 mph	2400 mi	31,500 ft	2500 kg			
Ilyushin Il-2 Shturmovik	Inline V-12: Mikulin	250 mph	475 mi	14,846 ft	600 kg			
Ilyushin Il-4		mph	mi	ft	kg			
Ilyushin Il-10 Shturmovik	Inline V-12: Mikulin	342 mph	500 mi	18,000 ft	600 kg			
North American B-25 Mitchell (United States)		mph	mi	ft	kg			
Petlyakov Pe-2		mph	mi	ft	kg			
Petlyakov Pe-8		mph	mi	ft	kg			
Polikarpov Po-2		mph	mi	ft	kg			
Sukhoi Su-2		mph	mi	ft	kg			
Tupolev SB		mph	mi	ft	kg			
Tupolev TB-3		mph	mi	ft	kg			
Tupolev Tu-2		mph	mi	ft	kg			
Yakovlev Yak-2		mph	mi	ft	kg			
Yakovlev Yak-4		mph	mi	ft	kg			
Yermolayev Yer-2		mph	mi	ft	kg			

== Sources ==
- Angelucci, Enzo; Matricardi, Paolo (1977). World War II Airplanes. Vol. 2. Chicago: Rand McNally. ISBN 0-528-88171-X.
- Ward, Edward (2021). Russian Aircraft of World War II: 1939 - 1945. London: Amber Books Ltd. ISBN 978-1-83886-083-7.
