= Nikitin NV-1 =

General information
- Type: Sporting Aircraft
- National origin: USSR
- Designer: Vasilii Vasilyevich Nikitin
- Number built: 1

History
- First flight: September 1933

The Nikitin NV-1 was a single-seat sporting aircraft produced in the USSR in 1933.

== Development ==
Whilst working under Grigorovich and Polikarpov, as well as at the TsKB (Central Construction Bureau) and OKB-30, Nikitin designed and built aircraft that carried his name despite not having an OKB. Inspired by racing aircraft in the US, Nikitin designed and built the NV-1 tailwheeled monoplane sporting aircraft. The wooden wing was braced to the fuselage and fixed spatted main undercarriage with streamlined steel struts. The fuselage was built up with welded steel tubing and a duralumin tail unit, all covered with fabric. The flying controls were operated by push-pull rods throughout.

Flight testing began in September 1933 by V.P.Chkalov. Chkalov reported that the NV-1 was difficult to fly, and after nine flights further work was abandoned.

== Specifications (NV-1) ==
Data from Gunston, Bill. "Encyclopedia of Russian Aircraft 1875–1995". London:Osprey. 1995. ISBN 1-85532-405-9

General characteristics

- Crew: 1
- Length: 4.25 m (13 ft 11.33 in)
- Wingspan: 6.4 m (21 ft 0 in)
- Wing area: 6.85 m^{2} (73.7 sq ft)
- Empty weight: 350 kg (772 lb)
- Gross weight: 510 kg (1,124 lb)
- Powerplant: 1 × M-11 , 74.57 kW (100 hp)

Performance

- Maximum speed: 232 km/h (144 mph, 125 kn)
- Range: 850 km (528 mi, 459 nmi)
- Service ceiling: 4,800 m (15,570 ft)

== See also ==
Aircraft of comparable role, configuration, and era

- Gee Bee Sportster
- Yakovlev AIR-9
- Yakovlev UT-1

Related lists

- List of aircraft
