= Yakovlev Yak-52 =

Soviet military training aircraft

Yak-52
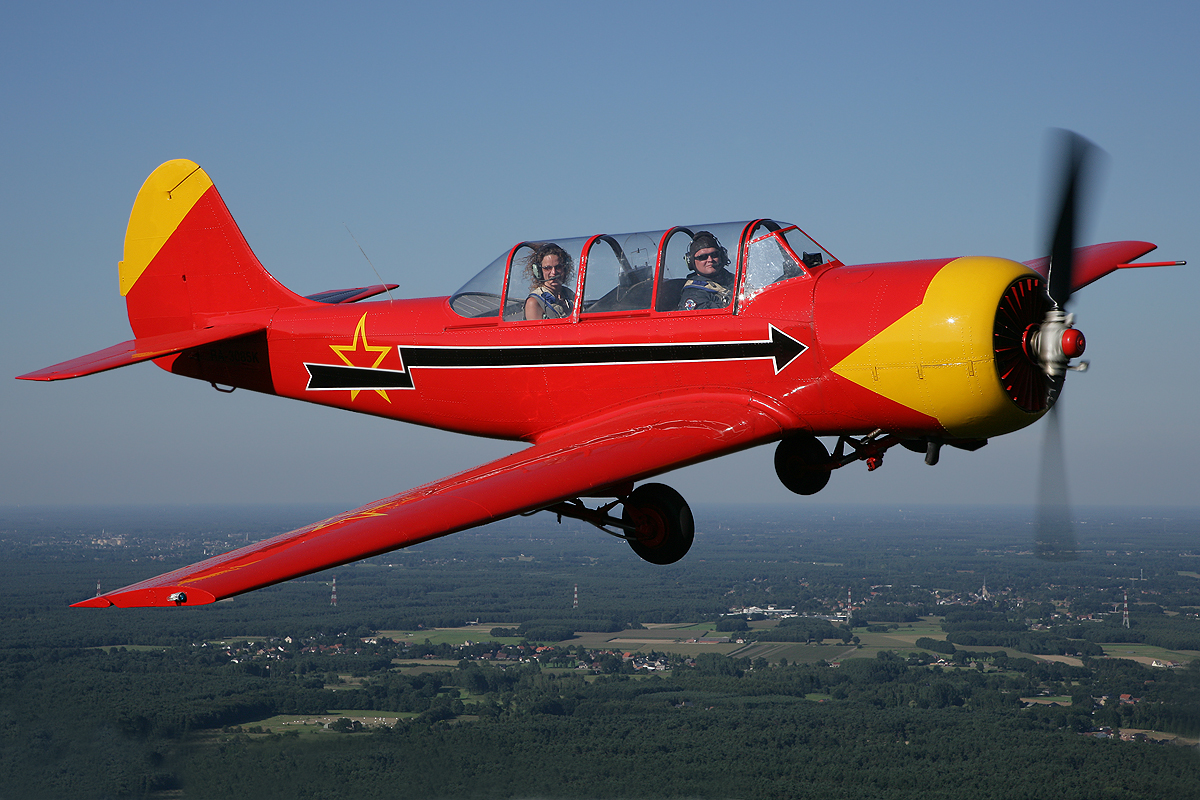
- Yak-52

General information
- Type: Trainer, COIN
- Manufacturer: Yakovlev; Aerostar
- Status: Operational
- Primary users: Soviet Air Force DOSAAF; Ukrainian Army Aviation

History
- Manufactured: 1978–1998
- Introduction date: 1979
- First flight: 1976
- Developed from: Yakovlev Yak-50
- Developed into: Yakovlev Yak-53

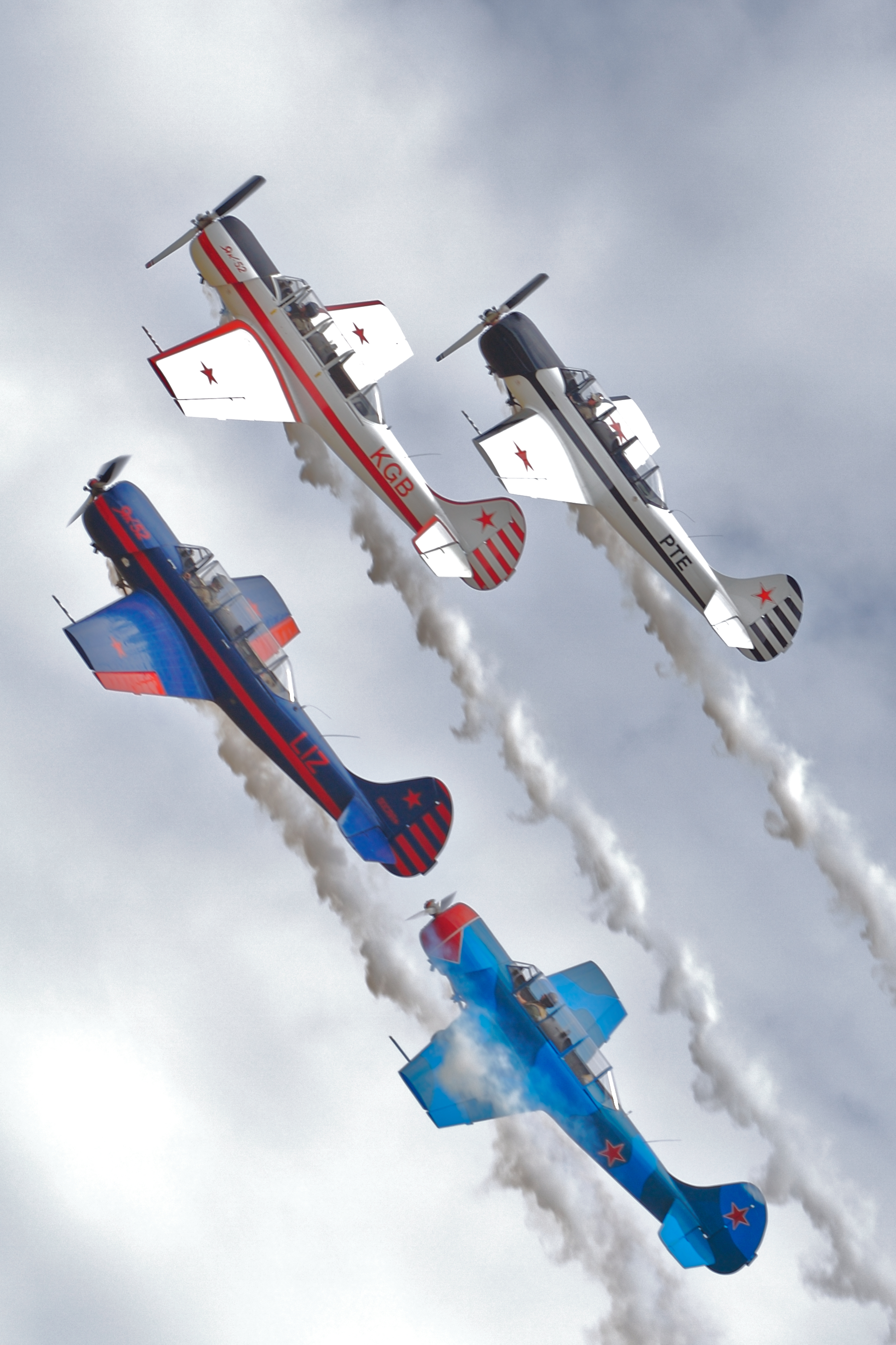
Yakovlev Yak-52s at 2007 Wings over Wairarapa airshow

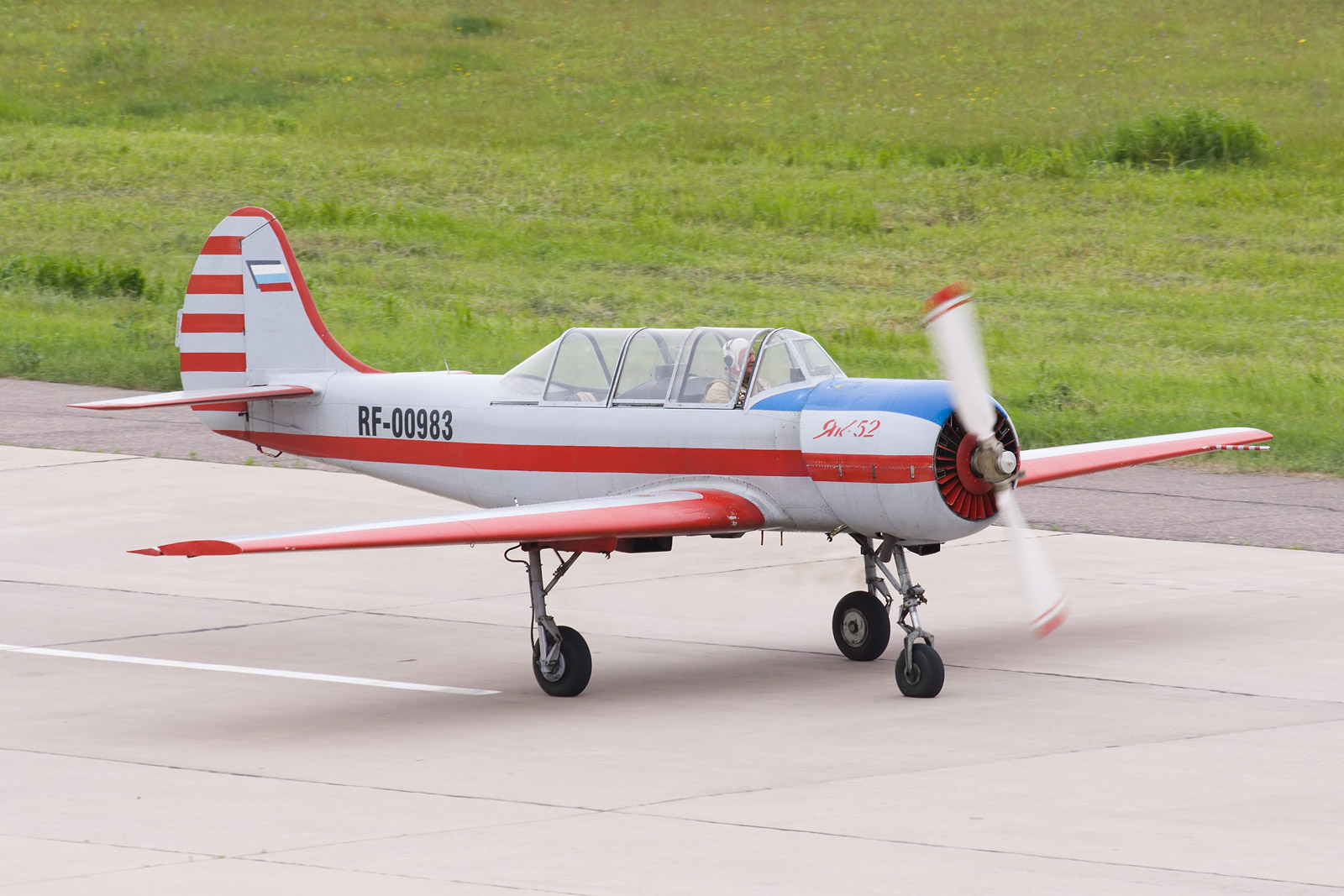
Yak-52 at Kubinka (air base)

The Yakovlev Yak-52 (Russian: Яковлев Як-52) is a Soviet primary trainer aircraft which first flew in 1976. It was produced in Romania from 1977 to 1998 by Aerostar, as Iak-52, which gained manufacturing rights under agreement within the former COMECON socialist trade organisation. The Yak-52 was designed as an aerobatic trainer for students in the Soviet DOSAAF training organisation, which trained civilian sport pilots and military pilots.

Currently the Yak-52 is used in the Fédération Aéronautique Internationale (FAI) World Aerobatic Yak 52 Competition, a popular powered aircraft one-design World Aerobatic Championship. Both the Ukraine and Russian militaries use it to interdict strike drones during the Russo-Ukraine war.

== Design and development ==
A descendant of the single-seat competition aerobatic Yakovlev Yak-50, the all-metal Yak-52 is powered by a 268 kW (360 hp) Vedeneyev M14P nine-cylinder radial engine.

Since the aircraft was designed to serve as a military trainer, the development of the aircraft incorporates a number of features to be found on the early postwar fighters: the cockpit tandem layout (instrument panel, seat design, cockpit opening system), tail design, tricycle landing gear, fuselage mixed construction (monocoque with steel tube construction), inner flaps, controls position, access panels on sides of the fuselage, even the location of the radio antenna and overall dimensions of the airplane, which match the Yakovlev Yak-17 UTI jet fighter trainer (NATO code name Magnet).

The aircraft has fuel and oil systems permitting inverted flight for as long as two minutes. The engine drives a two-bladed counter-clockwise rotating, variable pitch, wood and fiberglass laminate propeller.

At 998 kg (2,200 lb) empty weight, the Yak-52 has been used in international aerobatic competition up to the Advanced level. It is stressed to +7 and –5 Gs, rolls (to the right) at well more than 180 degrees/second (measured up to 352 degrees/second to the right), and is capable of every manoeuvre in the Aresti catalog.

The Yak-52, like most Soviet military aircraft, was designed to operate in rugged environments with minimal maintenance. One of its key features, unusual in western aircraft, is its extensive pneumatic system. Engine starting, landing gear, flaps, and wheel brakes are all pneumatically actuated. Spherical storage bottles for air, replenished by an engine driven compressor, are situated behind the rear cockpit and contents displayed on the instrument panels. The operating pressure is between 10 and 50 bars (145 and 725 psi) and an emergency circuit is reserved for lowering the undercarriage if the normal supply is exhausted or the compressor fails. Additionally both main and reserve bottles can be charged from a port on the ground with compressed air, usually from a scuba type air bottle. The ground steering/braking arrangement, especially, takes some adjustment for flyers accustomed to hydraulics, because the aircraft uses differential braking controlled by rudder pedals and a hand-operated lever on the control stick.

The tricycle landing gear is retractable, but it remains partially exposed in the retracted position, affording both a useful level of drag in down manoeuvres and a measure of protection should the aircraft be forced to land "wheels up."

A number of "westernised" versions of the Yak-52 are now produced. The replacement of the existing Soviet avionics, fitting of a three-blade propeller and the M14PF 298 kW (400 hp) upgrade to the usual 360 hp M14P engine, and conversion to conventional "tail-dragger" landing gear (Yak-52TD) are some of the modifications made to the standard aircraft. There is also a factory-produced Yak-52TW tail-dragger version by Aerostar. The TW has an extra 120 L (32 US gal) of fuel capacity in two extra wing tanks, the M14PF engine designated & three blade propeller, an electric start, and modern instruments.

On 16 April 2004, a modernised variant Yak-52M was flown in Russia. It is fitted with modernised M-14Kh engine, three-blade propeller, and other modifications.

Despite being unarmed, Yak-52 planes have been deployed by Ukraine in anti-drone roles during the Russian invasion of Ukraine, shooting down a Russian Orlan-10 reconnaissance drone over Odessa in April 2024, and to shoot down a ZALA drone on 8 June 2024. Images posted on social media suggest that at least one Yak-52 has downed up to eight drones. The Yak-52's low stall speed allows the plane to pursue drones and carry out maneuvers at slower speeds, enabling a machine gunner in the plane's rear seat to engage drones at close range.

== Variants ==
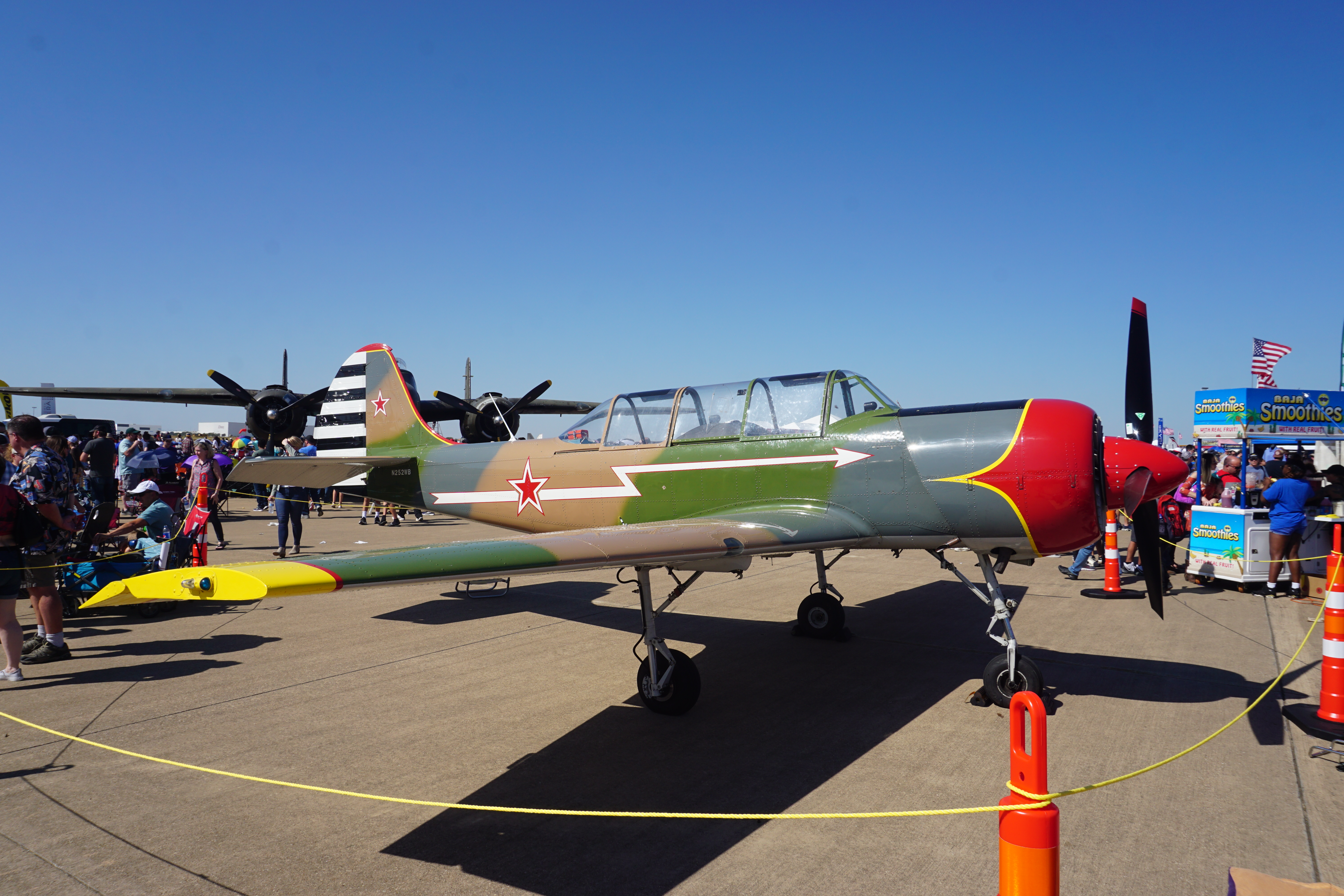
Aerostar Iak-52

Yak-52
Two-seat primary trainer aircraft, powered by a 360-hp (268-kW) Vedeneyev M-14P nine-cylinder radial piston-engine.
Yak-52B
Two-seat light ground-attack aircraft, armed with two UB-32-57 rocket pods, each capable of carrying up to 32 air-to-ground S-5 rockets.
Yak-52M
2003 modernised version, powered by a Vedeneyev M-14X radial piston engine. It is fitted with a three-bladed propeller, new avionics and crew escape system.
Iak-52
Romanian designation of Yak-52 produced by Aerostar.
Aerostar Condor
Westernised version proposed by Aerostar, powered by Lycoming O-540 engine.
Iak-52W
Westernised version produced by Aerostar, powered by M-14P or M-14Kh engine, but with all western instruments installed.
Iak-52TW
Westernised version produced by Aerostar, powered by M-14P or M-14Kh engine and tail wheel instead of front wheel. This version has all-western instruments, and fuel tanks enlarged to 280 L.
Iak-52TD
Modified Yak-52 with more powerful M-14PF engine and a tailwheel configuration by Termikas Ltd in Lithuania. Modifications include a set of wings with integrated aerobatic and ferry tanks (total capacity 230 litres), and allow complete retraction (no portions of the gear/main strut extend below wing structure). Bulletin 60 (strong joint fittings of the main spar) and Bulletin 107 (steel strap on the main spar installed) also completed at modification.
UTL-450
A variant of the Yak-52 presented by Motor Sich in 2016, powered by the AI-450S turboprop engine.

== Operators ==
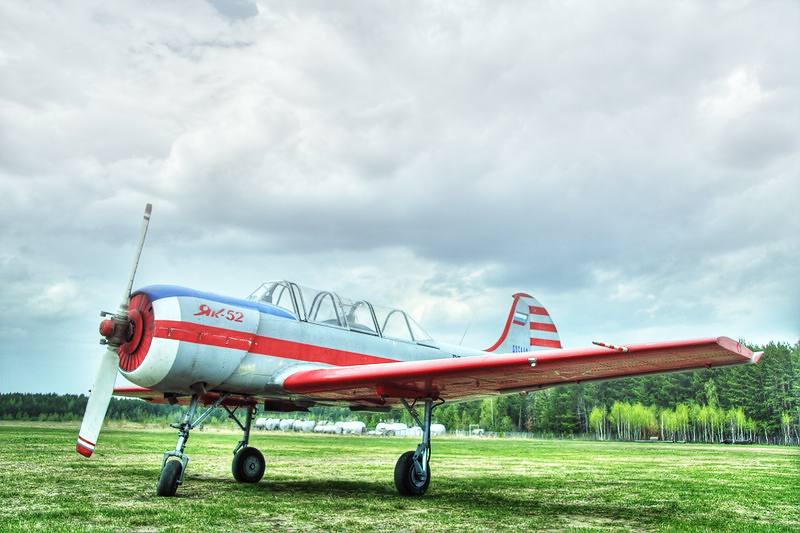
DOSAAF Yak-52

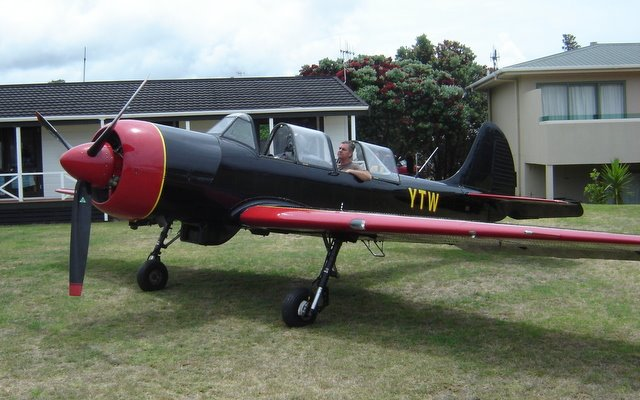
Iak-52TW at Pauanui, New Zealand

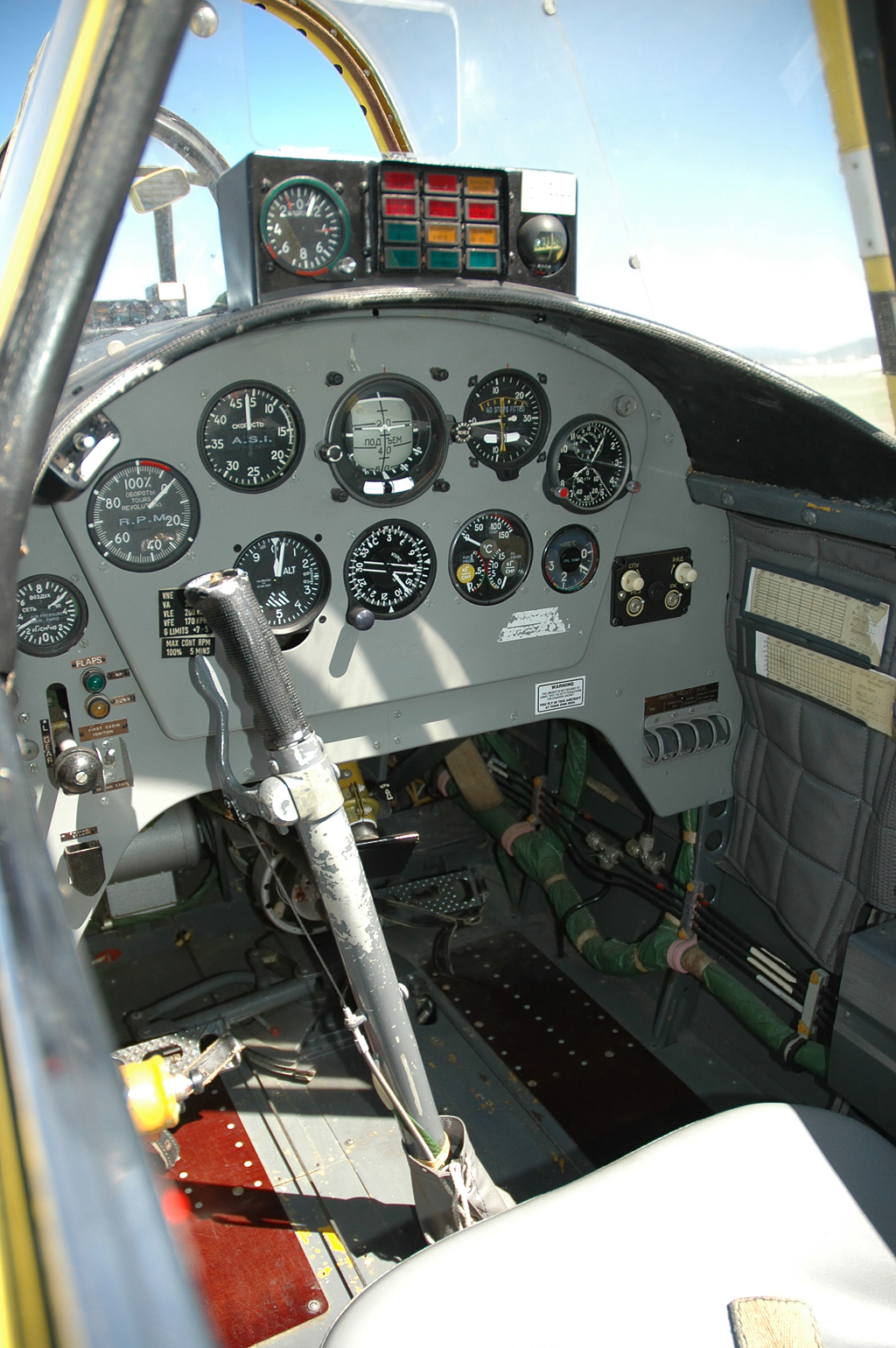
Yak-52 front cockpit

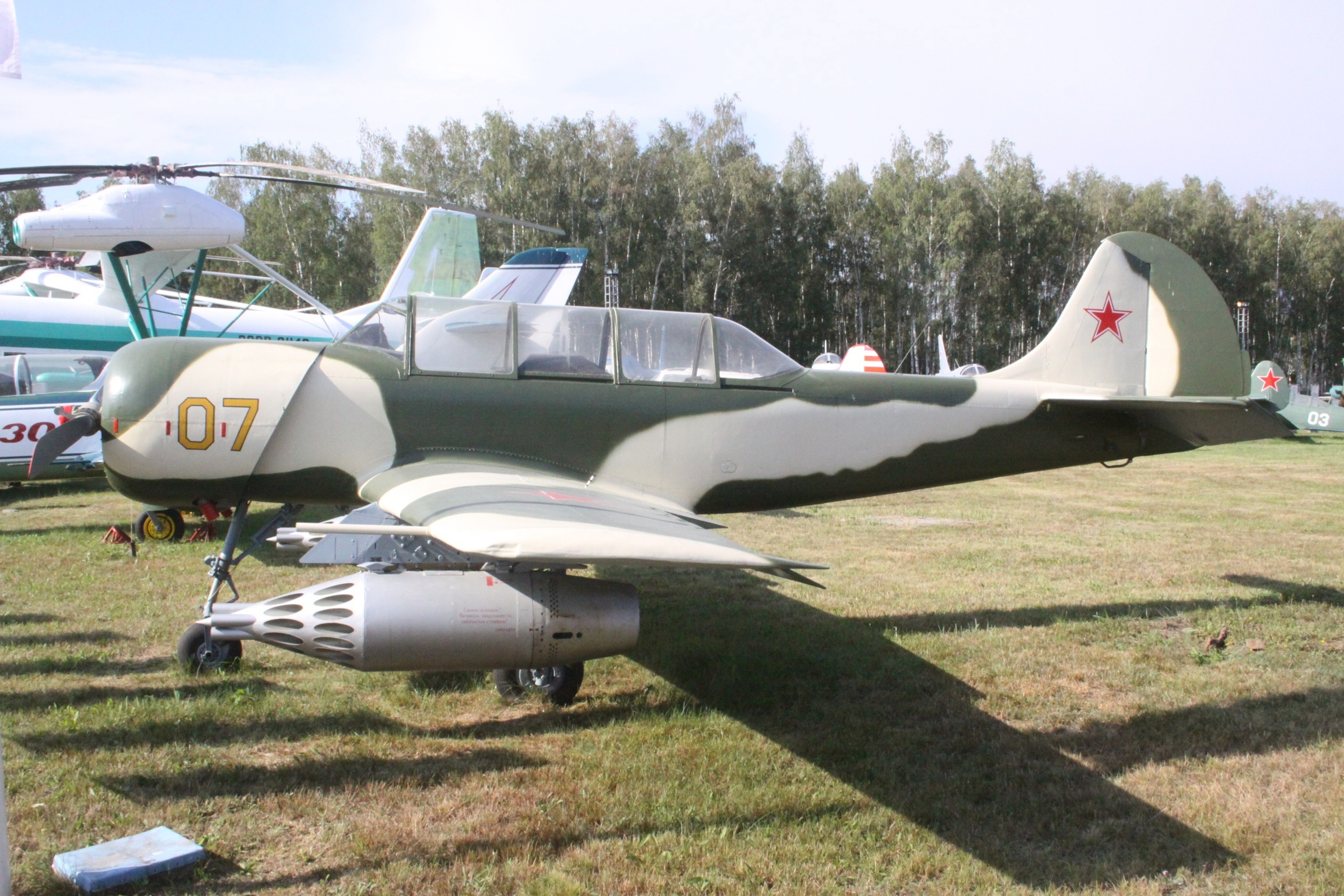
Yak-52B at Monino Air Force museum

In late 2025, the World Air Forces publication by FlightGlobal, which tracks the aircraft inventories of world's air forces and publishes its counts annually, published the World Air Forces 2026 report. According to that report, the only military operator of Yak-52 in the world is the Romanian Air Force with 14 aircraft.

=== Military operators ===
Armenia

- Armenian Air Force - 10

Belarus

- DOSAAF (Belarus)

Bulgaria

- Bulgarian Air Force

Georgia

- Georgian Air Force

Latvia

- Latvian Air Force

Lithuania

- Lithuanian National Defence Volunteer Forces

Romania

- Romanian Air Force - 12

Russia

- DOSAAF Russia

Ukraine

- Civil Air Patrol (Ukraine)
- Ukrainian Army Aviation

Turkmenistan

- Military of Turkmenistan

Vietnam

- Vietnam People's Air Force - 36

Transnistria

- Transnistria Air Force 0-2

=== Former military operators ===
Abkhazia

- Abkhazian Air Force

Soviet Union

- DOSAAF
- Soviet Air Force

=== Civilian operators ===
Italy

- Yakitalia is an Italian civil aerobatic team founded in 1999. It operates three Yak-52s and one Yak-50. The team's operational base is at Fano "Enzo e Walter Omiccioli" Airport (LIDF) in the Marche region.

== Operational history ==
=== Ukraine ===
While the Yak-52 was never intended to serve as an air-to-air combat platform, improvisation during the Russo-Ukrainian war has led to the platform attaining kills against UAVs.

On 27 April 2024, over Odesa, Ukraine, footage emerged from the perspective of a Russian drone showing a Yak-52 being flown by Ukrainian pilots with the canopy open. The first crew member, the pilot, flew circles around the drone as the second crew member attacked the drone with a shotgun. Through this method, a Yak-52 has reportedly attained 6 kills against Orlan 10/30 series drones and 2 against Zala 421-16E drones. Two more kills are attributed to lightning striking one UAV in front of the Ukrainian pilots, and another to a drone encountering a birdstrike.

As of June 2024, multiple Yak-52 operated by the Armed Forces of Ukraine feature numerous drone kill marks, depicting both strike and reconnaissance drones, indicating that the use of the aircraft against drones has become routine. The typical combat arrangement involves a shooter with an automatic rifle seated in the rear seat. Some of the aircraft are known to be assigned to the Ukrainian Army Aviation 11th Brigade stationed in Kherson. As of September 2025, another interview with a Yak-52 gunner featured a shoulder patch of the 11th Brigade. In a September 2025 interview with the Wall Street Journal, 11th Brigade deputy commander Mykola Lykhatsky claimed that air-to-air interceptions with piston aircraft and helicopters are responsible for 10-12% of the total number of Russian fixed-wing drones shot down, with the primary targets being Orlan, Lancet and Shahed drones.

=== Russia ===
As of 2025, Russia has begun using the Yak-52 to intercept Ukrainian strike drones. On 21 October 2025, a video published by the Security Service of Ukraine showed two landed Russian aircraft, a Yak-52 and a Cessna 172, concealed by camouflage, being destroyed by Ukrainian loitering munitions on 15 October 2025.

== Specifications (Iak 52) ==
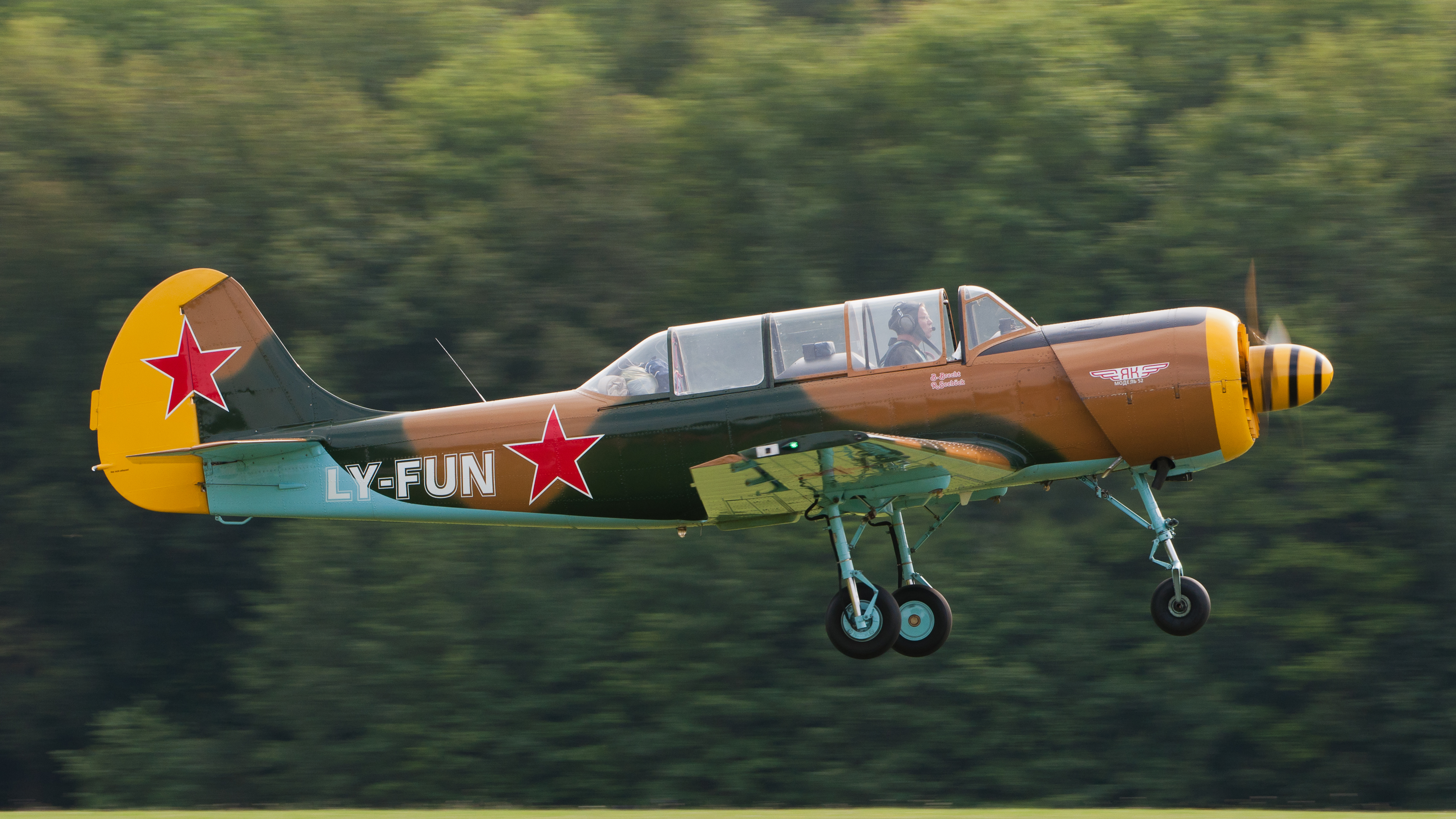
Privately owned Yak-52 during takeoff

Data from Jane's All The World's Aircraft 1993-94

General characteristics

- Crew: 2
- Length: 7.745 m (25 ft 5 in)
- Wingspan: 9.30 m (30 ft 6 in)
- Height: 2.70 m (8 ft 10 in)
- Wing area: 15.00 m^{2} (161.5 sq ft)
- Airfoil: Clark YN
- Empty weight: 1,015 kg (2,238 lb)
- Max takeoff weight: 1,305 kg (2,877 lb)
- Fuel capacity: 122 L (32 US gal; 27 imp gal)
- Powerplant: 1 × Vedeneyev M-14P nine-cylinder radial engine, 270 kW (360 hp)
- Propellers: 2-bladed V-530TA-D35 constant-speed propeller, 2.40 m (7 ft 10 in) diameter

Performance

- Maximum speed: 285 km/h (177 mph, 154 kn) at sea level
- Cruise speed: 190 km/h (120 mph, 100 kn) at 1,000 m (3,300 ft) (econ cruise)
- Stall speed: 85–90 km/h (53–56 mph, 46–49 kn) flaps down, engine idling
- Never exceed speed: 360 km/h (220 mph, 190 kn)
- Range: 550 km (340 mi, 300 nmi) at 500 m (1,600 ft)
- Service ceiling: 4,000 m (13,000 ft)
- g limits: +7/-5
- Rate of climb: 5.00 m/s (985 ft/min)
- Time to altitude: 15 min to 4,000 m (13,000 ft)

== See also ==
Related development

- Yakovlev Yak-11
- Yakovlev Yak-18
- Yakovlev Yak-50

Aircraft of comparable role, configuration, and era

- North American NA-16
- North American T-6 Texan
- I.Ae. 22 DL
- PZL TS-8 Bies
- Soko 522
- Valmet Vihuri
- Nanchang CJ-6

Related lists

- List of Yakovlev aircraft
