= UT3 (disambiguation) =

UT3, UT 3 or UT-3 might refer to:

- Unreal Tournament 3
- Utah's 3rd congressional district
- Urea transporter
- Yakovlev UT-3
