= Yakovlev Yak-152 =

Russian trainer aircraft

Yak-152
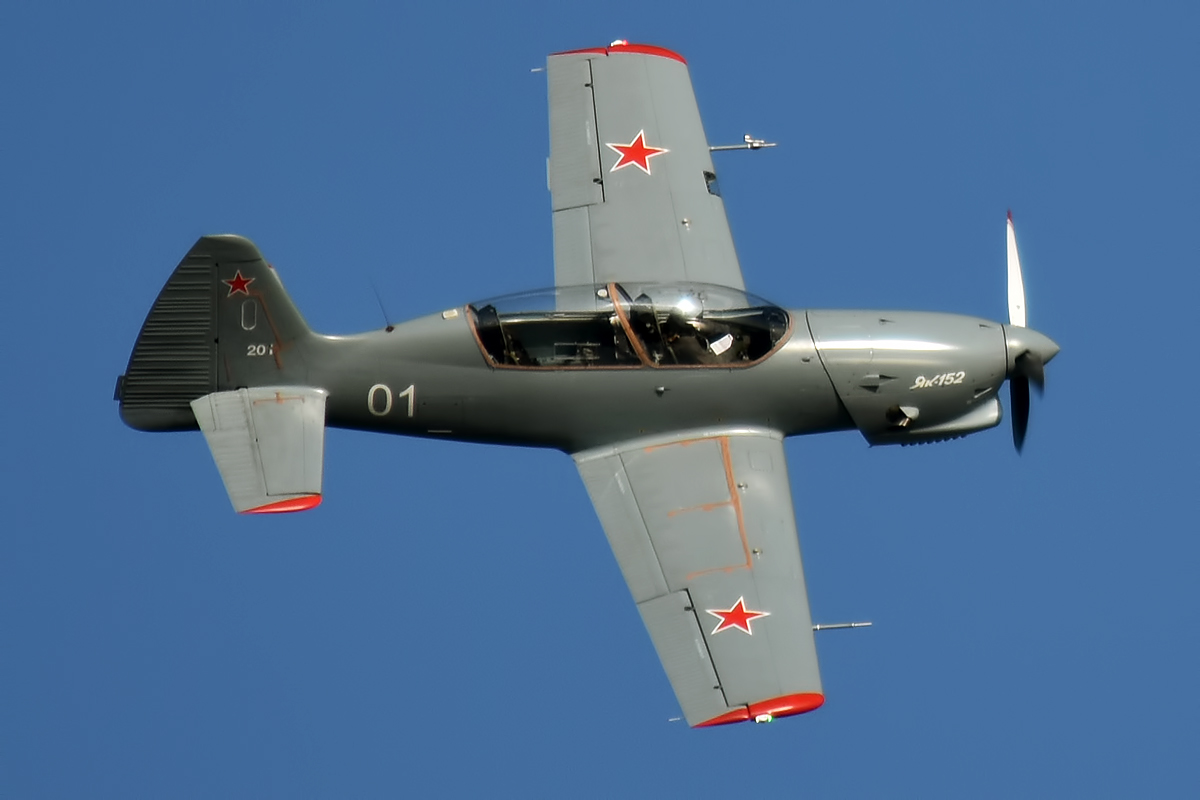

General information
- Type: Primary trainer
- National origin: Russian Federation
- Manufacturer: Irkut Corporation
- Designer: Yakovlev
- Status: Flight tests completed
- Primary user: Russian Aerospace Forces
- Number built: 4 prototypes

History
- First flight: 29 September 2016
- Variant: Hongdu Yakovlev CJ-7

The Yakovlev Yak-152 is a Russian primary trainer aircraft from the Yakovlev Design Bureau, part of the Irkut Corporation. The prototype Yak-152 first flew on 29 September 2016, powered by a RED A03 diesel engine, rated at 500 shp (370 kW). The aircraft has been ordered by the Russian Aerospace Forces to replace aging Yakovlev Yak-52 trainers. Currently being manufactured in Irkutsk.

== Development ==
Development started in the 1990s, simultaneously with a more advanced turbofan trainer YAK-130, based on the successful YAK-54 design. Both were supposed to have similar cockpits to allow for easy changeover from a lighter YAK-152 to bigger YAK-130. By 2001 the new type was selected as the future main primary air force trainer. During the early 2000s progress of the project was limited due to lack of funding. In 2006 Chinese investors financed further development of the project, creating their own offspring Hongdu Yakovlev CJ-7, equipped with the Russian Vedeneyev M14X radial piston engine

Yakovlev Design Bureau (a.k.a. Irkut) chose Russian-German RED A03 diesel V-type engine created by Vladimir Raikhlin, who moved to Germany from Russia where he worked as automotive engineer at VAZ. Engine manufacturing in Adenau, Germany was financed by Russian FINAM holding. However, as international sanctions against Russia mounted making engines imports impossible, Yakovlev Bureau Russian reverted to domestic alternatives, like the VMZ M-9F piston or Klimov VK-800 turboshaft engines, although these will require large adaptations.

In 2016 the Russian Ministry of Defence announced their intention to purchase at least 150 units once they are into mass production. In January 2024 the flight tests for the military were completed.

Besides military use, the aircraft was also projected for general aviation. Order of 105 units was planned by Russian DOSAAF for civil pilots' training, also Belarusian DOSAAF expressed their interest in purchasing the aircraft.

== Operators ==
Russia

- Russian Aerospace Forces – 150 on order

== Specifications (Yak-152) ==
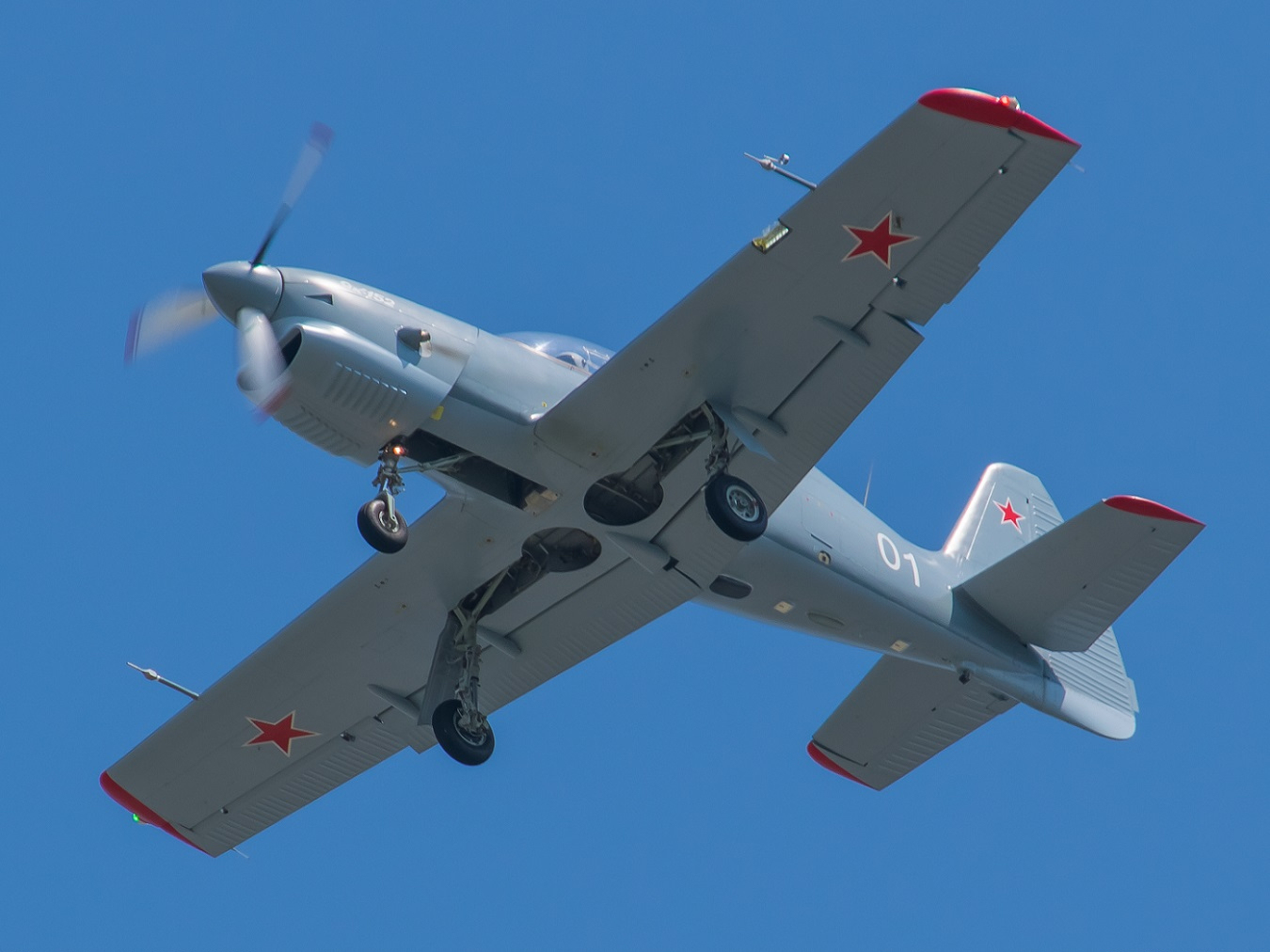
Yak-152 in flight in Irkutsk.

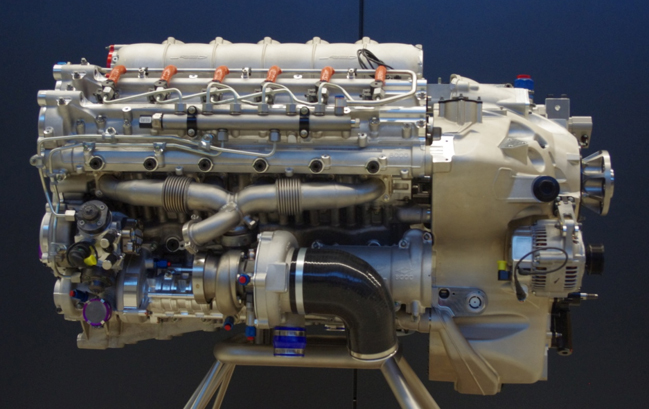
RED A03 Diesel engine

Data from Manufacturer and Air Force Technology

General characteristics

- Crew: one
- Capacity: one passenger
- Length: 7.72 m (25 ft 4 in)
- Wingspan: 8.82 m (28 ft 11 in)
- Height: 3.11 m (10 ft 2 in)
- Wing area: 12.9 m^{2} (139 sq ft)
- Aspect ratio: 6.0031
- Gross weight: 1,320 kg (2,910 lb)
- Max takeoff weight: 1,700 kg (3,748 lb)
- Fuel capacity: 245 kg (540 lb)
- Powerplant: 1 × RED Aircraft A03 V-12 four-stroke diesel engine, 370 kW (500 hp)
- Propellers: 3-bladed MTV-9-E-C/CL240-55a

Performance

- Maximum speed: 500 km/h (310 mph, 270 kn)
- Stall speed: 100 km/h (62 mph, 54 kn)
- Range: 1,500 km (930 mi, 810 nmi)
- Service ceiling: 4,000 m (13,000 ft)
- g limits: +8/-6
- Rate of climb: 10 m/s (2,000 ft/min)

== See also ==
- Yakovlev Yak-130
