= DOSAAF =

Paramilitary aviation sport and education organization in the Soviet Union

DOSAAF (Volunteer Society for the Assistance to the Army, Aviation, and Navy)
- ДОСААФ (Добровольное общество содействия армии, авиации и флоту)
- Formation: 20 August 1951
- Dissolved: December 1991
- Type: non-governmental organization

DOSAAF (Russian: ДОСААФ), full name Volunteer Society for the Assistance to the Army, Aviation, and Navy (Russian: Добровольное общество содействия армии, авиации и флоту, romanized: Dobrovol'noe obshchestvo sodeystviya armii, aviatsii i flotu), was a paramilitary sport organization in the Soviet Union that was concerned mainly with weapons, automobiles and aviation. The society was established in 1927 as OSOAVIAKhIM and from 1951 to 1991 carried the name of DOSAAF.

Individual divisions of the society were inherited and maintained by several post-Soviet governments, namely the Russian DOSAAF and Belarusian DOSAAF. The DOSAAF of the former Russian Soviet Federative Socialist Republic was renamed the Russian Defense Sports-Technical Organization (ROSTO; Russian: Российская оборонная спортивно-техническая организация – РОСТО, romanized: Rossiyskaya oboronnaya sportivno-tekhnicheskaya organizatsiya) in December 1991; however in 2009 it reverted to its former Soviet title.

The stated goal of the society was "patriotic upbringing of the population and preparation of it to the defense of the Motherland." Among the means to achieve that was the development of paramilitary sports. Initially, an important goal was financial support of the Soviet Armed Forces. At the same time, ordinary sports were supported within the framework of DOSAAF facilities such as sports halls, stadiums, swimming pools, gymnasiums and others.

== History ==
=== OSOAVIAKhIM ===
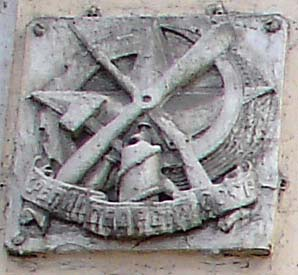
Osoaviakhim badges were fixed to buildings whose residents had donated a preset amount of money to Osoaviakhim

The precursor of DOSAAF was the OSOAVIAKhIM (Russian: ОСОАВИАХИМ; full name: Союз обществ содействия обороне и авиационно-химическому строительству СССР, 'Union of Societies of Assistance to Defense and Aviation-Chemical Construction of the USSR') created on 27 January 1927 by merging the Society of Assistance to Defense (Общество содействия обороне (ОСО)), Society of Friends of the Air Force (Общество друзей Воздушного флота (ОДВФ)) and Society of Friends of Chemical Defense and the Chemical Industry (Общество друзей химической обороны и химической промышленности (Доброхим СССР)).

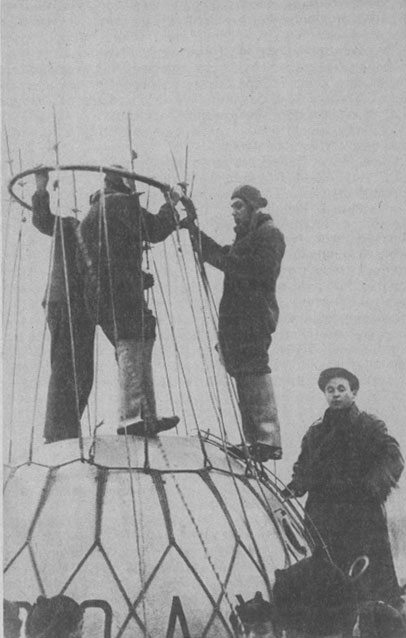
The Osoaviakhim-1 crew boarding their flight in 1934

The goal of the society was preparation of reserves for armed forces. It soon became a powerful paramilitary with its own airfields, radio clubs, parachuting towers, and firing ranges. It became prestigious and romantic among Soviet youth to earn badges such as "Voroshilov sharpshooter" (Russian: Ворошиловский стрелок), "Voroshilov horse rider" (Russian: Ворошиловский всадник) and "Distinguished Parachute Jumper".

OSOAVIAKhIM supported a number of professional research and development programs for airplanes, glider, airships and stratospheric balloons, some of which were later taken over by the Soviet Air Forces. In 1934, the organisation carried out the record-setting mission of the high-altitude balloon Osoaviakhim-1. Also in the 1930s, Sergey Korolev's rocket research organization, GIRD, and Oleg Antonov's glider project, among other efforts, were part of the OSOAVIAKhIM.

=== Post-World War II ===
In March 1948, OSOAVIAKhIM was reorganized into three separate societies: The Voluntary Society of Assistance to the Army (Russian: Добровольное общество содействия армии (ДОСАРМ)), The Voluntary Society of Assistance to the Air Force (Russian: Добровольное общество содействия авиации (ДОСАВ)) and The Voluntary Society of Assistance to the Navy (Russian: Добровольное общество содействия флоту (ДОСФЛОТ)). On 20 August 1951 they were re-merged as a single society, DOSAAF.

== See also ==
- Svazarm, in Czechoslovakia
- Defense Assistance Organization, Bulgarian government-sponsored network of youth clubs
- SSSR-V6 OSOAVIAKhIM (Osoaviakhim airship)
- US Civil Air Patrol
