= Yakovlev AIR-5 =

Prototype Soviet single-engined cabin monoplane

AIR-5
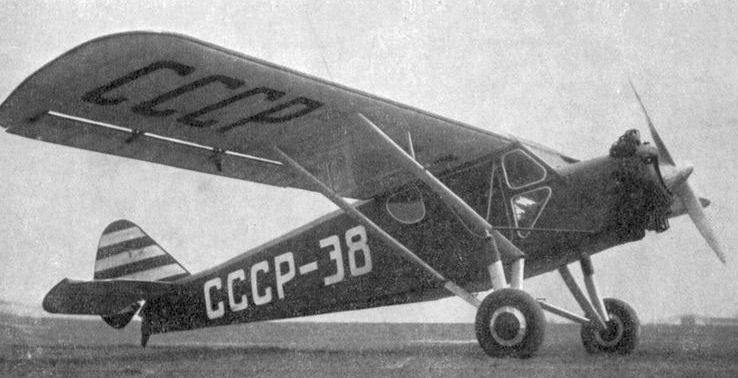

General information
- Type: Single-engined cabin monoplane
- National origin: Soviet Union
- Manufacturer: Yakovlev
- Number built: 1

History
- First flight: 1931
- Developed into: Yakovlev AIR-6

The Yakovlev AIR-5 was a prototype Soviet single-engined cabin monoplane designed by the Yakovlev design bureau. The AIR-5 was a high-wing strut-braced monoplane with a 200 hp (149 kW) Wright J-4 Whirlwind engine. It had a tubular steel fuselage, wooden wings and an enclosed cabin for a pilot and three passengers.

When the Whirlwind engine became unavailable no further aircraft were produced and a smaller variant was designed with a locally produced M-11 radial engine and designated the AIR-6.

== Specifications ==
Data from The History of Soviet Aircraft from 1918

General characteristics

- Crew: one
- Capacity: three
- Length: 8 m (26 ft 3 in)
- Wingspan: 12.8 m (42 ft 0 in)
- Height: 2.46 m (8 ft 1 in) (tail up)
- Wing area: 23 m^{2} (250 sq ft)
- Empty weight: 670 kg (1,477 lb)
- Max takeoff weight: 912 kg (2,011 lb)
- Powerplant: 1 × Wright J-4 Whirlwind air-cooled radial engine, 150 kW (200 hp)

Performance

- Maximum speed: 192 km/h (119 mph, 104 kn)
- Cruise speed: 152 km/h (94 mph, 82 kn)
- Range: 1,000 km (620 mi, 540 nmi)
- Service ceiling: 4,275 m (14,026 ft)
- Time to altitude: 6.5 minutes to 1,000 m (3,300 ft)
