= Yakovlev AIR-12 =

Soviet sport aircraft

AIR-12
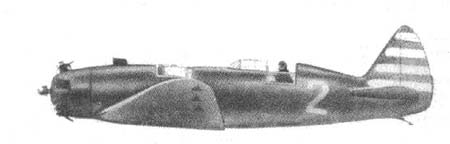

General information
- Type: Long-range record setting aircraft
- National origin: Soviet Union
- Designer: Aleksander Sergeyevich Yakovlev
- Number built: 1

History
- First flight: August 1936

The Yakovlev AIR-12 was a long-range sport aircraft designed and built in the Soviet Union during the late 1930s.

== Design and development ==
In 1936 Yakovlev designed a long-range sport aircraft, intended to perform record-breaking long-distance flights. Adhering to his established design methods, the AIR-12 had a welded steel tube covered by removable aluminium panels at the nose, plywood skinning back to the wing trailing edge and fabric fabric-covered rear fuselage. The plywood skinned wooden wings had a high aspect ratio and were sharply tapered with leading-edge sweep and straight trailing-edges. Control surfaces and tail unit were built up with D1 (duralumin) and covered with fabric.

Accommodation was provided for pilot and passenger/navigator in two closed cockpits. The pilot sat in the rear cockpit aft of the wing trailing-edges under a small forward-sliding canopy and flip-open side panels. The passenger/navigator's cockpit had a flush glazed roof and was situated over the centre-section.

Power was supplied by the ubiquitous 100 hp (75 kW) Shvetsov M-11 5-cylinder air-cooled radial engine, driving a two-bladed wooden fixed pitch propeller. Fuel was carried in a single large tank in the fuselage forward of the front cockpit and an auxiliary tank could also be fitted in the front cockpit.

The AIR-12 was fitted with a retractable tail-wheel undercarriage with the main-wheels retracting inwards, operated by cables, torque shaft and hand crank in the pilots cockpit.

After initial flight testing and Piontovskiy's long distance flight in September 1936, the AIR-12 was re-engined with a 150 hp (110 kW) M-11Ye.

== Operational history ==
Flight testing of the AIR-12 commenced in August 1936, including a long-distance non-stop flight, flown by Yulian I. Piontkovskiy on 21 September 1936, from Moscow to Kharkiv to Sevastopol, returning to Kharkiv, in a time of 10 hours 45 minutes, covering 2,000 km (1,200 mi). On 24 October 1937 the AIR-12, flown by Valentina Grizodoobova (pilot) and Marina Roskova (navigator), flew 1,444 km (897 mi) from Moscow to Akhtoobinsk but the flight was not recognised by the FAI due to no official observer being present.

== Specifications (AIR-12, M-11) ==
Data from OKB Yakovlev, Yakovlev aircraft since 1924

General characteristics

- Crew: 2
- Length: 7.17 m (23 ft 6 in)
- Wingspan: 11 m (36 ft 1 in)
- Wing area: 15.6 m^{2} (168 sq ft)
- Empty weight: 558 kg (1,230 lb)
- Max takeoff weight: 1,204 kg (2,654 lb)
- Fuel capacity: 430 kg (950 lb) fuel; 40 kg (88 lb) oil
- Powerplant: 1 × Shvetsov M-11 5-cylinder air-cooled radial piston engine, 75 kW (100 hp)
- Propellers: 2-bladed wooden fixed pitch propeller

Performance

- Maximum speed: 235 km/h (146 mph, 127 kn) *Landing speed: 93 km/h (58 mph; 50 kn)
- Range: 2,990 km (1,860 mi, 1,610 nmi)
- Take-off run: 220 m (720 ft)
