= Yakovlev Yak-200 =

Prototype Soviet aircraft

Yak-200
- The Yak-200 prototype after modifications

General information
- Type: Multi-engine trainer
- National origin: Soviet Union
- Manufacturer: Yakovlev
- Status: Cancelled
- Number built: 1 + 1 Yak-210

History
- First flight: 10 April 1953

The Yakovlev Yak-200 was a prototype Soviet multi-engine trainer built during the 1950s. A modified version was built as the Yak-210 for navigator training, but only one example of each was built before the program was cancelled in 1956.

== Development ==
The Yakovlev OKB began work in February 1951 on an aircraft that could be used as a cheap bomber trainer as the Yak-UTB (oochebnotrenirovochnyy bombardirovshchik — bomber trainer), but this was quickly split into two closely related versions, the Yak-200 for pilot training and the Yak-210 for navigator/bombardier training. The primary difference between them was in equipment; the Yak-200 lacked all of the specialized navigation and bombardier gear.

The Yak-200 was a mid-winged, twin-engined monoplane with a tricycle undercarriage. The metal-skinned, semi-monocoque fuselage was built in three sections with side-by-side seating for the crew. The nose was glazed with an optically flat panel and lacked a seat or any equipment. The control surfaces of the tail were fabric-covered although the tail itself was metal-skinned. The one-spar metal wing was made in three pieces with detachable trapezoidal outer panels. The ailerons were covered with fabric, as were the flaps in the outer wing panels, but the flaps in the center section were metal-skinned. The main undercarriage legs retracted forward into the engine nacelles, while the nose leg retracted backwards. Two 700-horsepower (520 kW) Shvetsov ASh-21 radial engines powered the Yak-200 and drove variable-pitch VISh-11V-20A propellers.

The Yak-210 carried a full suite of navigation equipment with which to train navigators. The main distinguishing characteristic between it and the Yak-200 was an external radome under the rear fuselage for the PSBN-M (pribor slepovo bombometahniya i navigahtsii—blind-bombing and navigational device) search/bomb-aiming radar as was fitted on the Ilyushin Il-28. An OPB-6SR (opticheskiy pritsel bombardirovochnyy—optical synchronized bombsight) and an AFA-BA-40 camera were also fitted; the latter could tilt 15° aft to record bomb impacts. All this equipment weighed 860.5 kg (1,897 lb) which forced the fuel load to be reduced by 235 kg (518 lb) in compensation. Seats were fitted in the nose for the trainee navigator and his instructor.

The Yak-200 prototype made its first flight on 10 April 1953 and it underwent its State acceptance trials between 29 July and 10 September. These revealed a number of problems including poor handling, insufficient longitudinal stability and significant changes in trim as engine power was changed. Other problems included the lack of anti-icing devices for the windshield and the propeller blades. Remedies included adding a 35 cm (14 in) extension in the fuselage and a dorsal fillet to correct the stability issues. The wings were raised by 10 cm (3.9 in) and their dihedral was reduced. These changes moved the aircraft's center of gravity forward and it became simple and pleasant to fly, even though its empty weight increased by 120 kg (260 lb) and its gross weight by 195 kg (430 lb) which did include some additional fuel.

The Yak-210 first flew on 1 August 1953 and it received some of the improvements given to the Yak-200 including the dorsal fin. Its radome was changed from its initial oval shape to a teardrop during testing. It could carry 300 kg (660 lb) of practice bombs.

All these modifications required time and the VVS ultimately decided that the Il-28U trainer met its requirements, despite the extra costs involved, and the program was cancelled.

== Specifications (Yak-200 before modifications) ==
Data from Gordon et al., OKB Yakovlev: A History of the Design Bureau and its Aircraft

General characteristics

- Crew: two
- Length: 12.95 m (42 ft 6 in)
- Wingspan: 17.45 m (57 ft 3 in)
- Wing area: 36 m^{2} (390 sq ft)
- Empty weight: 3,910 kg (8,620 lb)
- Max takeoff weight: 4,715 kg (10,395 lb)
- Powerplant: 2 × Shvetsov ASh-21 seven-cylinder, air-cooled, single-row, radial engine, 522 kW (700 hp) each
- Propellers: 2-bladed variable-pitch VISh-11V-20A

Performance

- Maximum speed: 400 km/h (250 mph, 220 kn)
- Range: 1,280 km (800 mi, 690 nmi)
- Service ceiling: 7,160 m (23,490 ft)
- Time to height: 2.3 minutes to 1,000 metres (3,281 ft)

== Bibliography ==
- Gordon, Yefim; Komissariov, Dmitry and Sergey (2005). OKB Yakovlev: A History of the Design Bureau and its Aircraft. Hinckley, England: Midland Publishing. ISBN 1-85780-203-9.
- Gunston, Bill (1995). The Osprey Encyclopedia of Russian Aircraft 1875-1995. London: Osprey. ISBN 1-85532-405-9.
