= Yakovlev Yak-48 =

Russian business jet project

General information
- Type: Twin-engined business jet
- National origin: Russia
- Manufacturer: Yakovlev
- Status: Project only
- Number built: none

The Yakovlev Yak-48 is a twin-engined long-range business jet or regional carrier.

== Specifications (Yak-48) ==
Data from

General characteristics

- Crew: 2
- Capacity: up to 19 pax
- Length: 19.3 m (63 ft 4 in)
- Wingspan: 17.42 m (57 ft 2 in)
- Wing area: 30.2 m^{2} (325 sq ft)
- Empty weight: 8,060 kg (17,769 lb)
- Max takeoff weight: 15,172 kg (33,449 lb)
- Powerplant: 2 × Pratt & Whitney Canada PW306A turbofan engines

Performance

- Maximum speed: 880 km/h (550 mph, 480 kn)
- Range: 6,852 km (4,258 mi, 3,700 nmi)

== See also ==
Related development

- IAI Galaxy
- Yakovlev Yak-77

Aircraft of comparable role, configuration, and era

- Sukhoi Superjet 100
- Yakovlev Yak-40
- Embraer E-Jets
- Bombardier Canadair Regional Jet
