= Yakovlev Yak-77 =

Russian regional airliner project

General information
- Type: Short-range airliner
- National origin: Russia
- Manufacturer: Yakovlev
- Status: Project only
- Number built: 0

History
- Introduction date: 1993

The Yakovlev Yak-77 was a planned commuter jet that was under construction during the 1990s, but no prototype was ever produced.

== History ==
The Yakovlev Yak-77 was planned to have been a commuter.

== Development ==
The construction of the Yak-77 occurred throughout the 1990s. It was predicted to be completed during 1997.

== Specifications (Yak-77) ==
Data from Yakovlev aircraft since 1924

General characteristics

- Crew: 2
- Capacity: 8 to 32 passengers
- Length: 20.45 m (67 ft 1 in)
- Wingspan: 21.55 m (70 ft 8 in)
- Wing area: 55 m^{2} (590 sq ft) ~
- Max takeoff weight: 25,234 kg (55,631 lb)
- Powerplant: 2 × Allison AE 3010/12 turbofan engines, 44.1 kN (9,920 lbf) thrust each

Performance

- Maximum speed: 800 km/h (500 mph, 430 kn)
- Max operating Mach no.: M0.8
- 'Economical cruise Mach no.: M0.75 / 800 km/h (500 mph; 430 kn) at 12,500 m (41,010 ft) up
- Range: 10,000 km (6,200 mi, 5,400 nmi) with 8 pax

6,000 km (3,700 mi; 3,200 nmi) with 32 pax

- Service ceiling: 12,500 m (41,000 ft)
- Balanced runway length: 2,200 m (7,218 ft)

== See also ==
Aircraft of comparable role, configuration, and era

- Sukhoi Superjet 100
- Yakovlev Yak-48
- Embraer E-Jets
- Bombardier Canadair Regional Jet
