= Yakovlev AIR-13 =

AIR-13

General information
- Type: Long-distance racing aircraft
- National origin: USSR
- Designer: A.S. Yakovlev

The Yakovlev AIR-13 was a projected twin-engined racing aircraft designed during 1935 in the Soviet Union, intended to participate in air races planned for 1936. Contemporary sketches show that the design bore a close similarity to the de Havilland DH.88 Comet, that had proved successful in the 1934 MacRobertson Trophy Air Race. The design did not progress beyond the drawing board.
