= Yakovlev AIR-6 =

1934 Soviet light utility aircraft

AIR-6

General information
- Type: Light utility aircraft
- National origin: Soviet Union
- Manufacturer: Yakovlev
- Designer: Alexander Sergeyevich Yakovlev
- Number built: 128

History
- Introduction date: 1934
- First flight: 1932
- Developed from: Yakovlev AIR-5

The Yakovlev AIR-6 was a Soviet light utility aircraft of the 1930s. It was a single-engined high-wing monoplane designed by Alexander Sergeyevich Yakovlev, with 128 being built.

== Design and development ==
In 1932, the Soviet aircraft designer Alexander Sergeyevich Yakovlev, working as an engineering supervisor at the Polikarpov OKB, designed the AIR-5, (Note: Early Yakovlev designed aircraft were designated AIR in honour of Alexei Rykov, the Chairman of the Council of People's Commissars) a five-seat high-wing monoplane with a steel-tube fuselage and a wooden wing, powered by an American Wright J-4 Whirlwind radial engine giving 149 kW (200 hp). Although the AIR-5 successfully passed State acceptance trials, no production followed, as there was no suitable Soviet replacement for the imported engine.

Yakovlev instead designed a scaled-down aircraft of similar layout to the AIR-5, but powered by a readily available 75 kW (100 hp) Shvetsov M-11 engine, to serve as a light utility aircraft. The new design, the AIR-6, was a high-wing monoplane using much of the structural design of the AIR-5, (and also featuring landing struts from the Polikarpov U-2 and tail surfaces from the Tupolev I-5 fighter), with a pilot and one or two passengers sitting in tandem in an enclosed cockpit.

== Operational history ==
The prototype AIR-6 flew in 1932, passing state acceptance trials in October 1933. An accident with the Yakovlev AIR-7 sport aircraft, however, was blamed on a design error by Yakovlev, who was sacked from the Polikarpov design bureau. This caused production plans to be delayed until Yakovlev was allowed to set up his own design bureau, with production starting in 1934. A total of 128 AIR-6s were built, with several being fitted with floats, and 20 equipped as specialist ambulance aircraft.

== Operators ==
Mongolia

- Mongolian Air Force

Soviet Union

- Soviet Air Force

== Specifications ==
Data from OKB Yakovlev

General characteristics

- Crew: one
- Capacity: one or two passengers
- Length: 7.8 m (25 ft 7 in)
- Wingspan: 12.08 m (39 ft 8 in)
- Wing area: 19.8 m^{2} (213 sq ft)
- Empty weight: 616 kg (1,358 lb)
- Gross weight: 961 kg (2,119 lb)
- Powerplant: 1 × Shvetsov M-11 five-cylinder radial engine, 75 kW (100 hp)

Performance

- Maximum speed: 168.5 km/h (104.7 mph, 91.0 kn)
- Cruise speed: 130 km/h (81 mph, 70 kn)
- Range: 715 km (444 mi, 386 nmi)
- Service ceiling: 4,600 m (15,100 ft)
- Time to altitude: 6.6 min to 1,000 m (3,300 ft)

== See also ==
Related development

- Yakovlev AIR-5
