= DOSAAF (Belarus) =

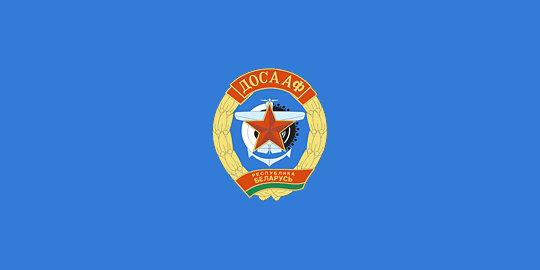
Flag of the Belarusian DOSAAF. The emblem of DOSAAF RB is in the center.

DOSAAF RB (Russian: Добровольное общество содействия армии, авиации и флоту Республики Беларусь, literally The Voluntary Society of Assistance to the Army, the Air Force and the Navy of the Republic of Belarus) is a Belarusian paramilitary organization. Formed in 2003, DOSAAF RB is based on the Soviet organization of the same name. The purposes of the organization are to promote citizen readiness, instill military training into Belarusian youth, citizenship education and provide training for essential military tasks and trades. Outside of the military, DOSAAF RB provides sporting and patriotic education and events to other Belarusian organizations.

== History ==
While there was a national DOSAAF organization in the former Soviet Union, the Byelorussian SSR had its own organization, called DOSAAF BSSR. In October, 1991, the national organization collapsed and was renamed the Belarusian Defense Sports Technical Society (Russian: Белорусское оборонное спортивно-техническое общество). The BelOCTO would later become the DOSAAF RB, based on a decree by the President of Belarus Alexander Lukashenko.

== See also ==
- DAO (Bulgaria)
- DOSAAF (Soviet Union)
- DOSAAF of Russia
