= Yakovlev Ya-19 =

Light transport aircraft

General information
- Type: Light transport
- National origin: USSR
- Manufacturer: OKB Yakovlev
- Designer: Oleg K. Antonov
- Number built: 1

History
- First flight: 1939
- Developed from: Yakovlev UT-3

The Yakovlev Ya-19 (aka S-19 or AIR-19), was a 5-seat light transport aircraft developed directly from the Yakovlev UT-3 during the late 1930s. The Ya-19 did not enter production, despite positive results from flight trials, due to the lack of development of the UT-3 and cancellation of the Voronezh MV-6 engine program, which were the result of changing priorities in the face of the Great Patriotic War.

== Design and development ==
A derivative of the Yakovlev UT-3, the Ya-19 was developed as a five-seat light transport by lead designer Oleg K. Antonov.

The Ya-19 mated the wings undercarriage, tail unit and engines of the UT-3 with a new fuselage seating five with a single pilot. Access to the cabin and cockpit was by a door on the port side adjacent to the trailing edge. Four passengers sat in the cabin, two a side and the fifth sat next to the right of the pilot in the cockpit.

In 1940 Aeroflot requested that the Ya-19 should be produced for use on short haul routes, but the increasing pace of rearmament in the Soviet Union meant that only a single prototype was built. Production was curtailed when the UT-3 failed to achieve large scale production.

An ambulance version capable of carrying two stretchers, one walking wounded and a medical assistant was proposed to the VVS. A mock-up review commission approved the design but production relied on continued development of the UT-3 and Ya-19, which was curtailed due to war requirements.

Use of the AIR-19 designation would have been very brief, if used at all, as AIR was dropped as a designation when A.I. Rykov was purged in one of Stalin's pogroms.

== Operational history ==
The sole prototype completed manufacturer's testing in October 1939 and was then passed to the NII GVF (Nauchno-Issledovatel'skiy Institut Grazdahnskovo Vozdooshnovo Flota - civil air fleet scientific test institute), for state acceptance trials which it passed with good results. Fate of the prototype is unknown.

== Specifications (Ya-19) ==
Data from OKB Yakovlev, Yakovlev aircraft since 1924

General characteristics

- Crew: 1 or 2
- Capacity: 5 passengers
- Length: 10.02 m (32 ft 10 in)
- Wingspan: 15 m (49 ft 3 in)
- Wing area: 33.42 m^{2} (359.7 sq ft)
- Empty weight: 2,134 kg (4,705 lb)
- Max takeoff weight: 2,950 kg (6,504 lb)
- Fuel capacity: 280 kg (620 lb) fuel, 26 kg (57 lb) oil
- Powerplant: 2 × Voronezh MV-6 6-cylinder inverted in-line air-cooled piston engines, 160 kW (220 hp) each
- Propellers: 2-bladed wooden fixed pitch propellers

Performance

- Maximum speed: 271 km/h (168 mph, 146 kn) *Landing speed: 86 km/h (53 mph; 46 kn)
- Cruise speed: 235 km/h (146 mph, 127 kn)
- Range: 783 km (487 mi, 423 nmi)
- Service ceiling: 5,600 m (18,400 ft)
- Time to altitude: 1,000 m (3,300 ft) in 5.3 minutes, 3,000 m (9,800 ft) in 17 minutes
- Take-off run: 410 m (1,350 ft)
- Landing run: 365 m (1,198 ft)
