= Yakovlev Yak-53 =

Aerobatic trainer aircraft

General information
- Type: Aerobatic trainer
- National origin: USSR
- Manufacturer: Yakovlev
- Number built: 1

History
- First flight: 1982
- Developed from: Yakovlev Yak-52

The Yakovlev Yak-53 was a single seat aerobatic trainer aircraft produced in the USSR during 1981/2. Only one prototype was produced.

== Development ==
The prototype Yak-53 was derived from the Yak-52, differing in being a single seater designed as an aerobatic trainer. The front cockpit was deleted and the canopy modified to suit. The cockpit used the flying controls of the Yak-50 without the spring loading of the Yak-52, and the use of the undercarriage and tankage of the prototype Yak-52 to save weight, making the Yak-53 100 kg (220 lb) lighter than the Yak-52.

== Operational history ==
The prototype Yak-53 set two world records for time to height in its class on 15 February and 23 February 1982. Some sources state that a 3-bladed propeller of western origin was used for the record setting flights.

== Specifications (Yak-53) ==
Data from OKB Yakovlev

General characteristics

- Crew: 1
- Length: 7.68 m (25 ft 2 in)
- Wingspan: 9.5 m (31 ft 2 in)
- Wing area: 15 m^{2} (160 sq ft)
- Empty weight: 900 kg (1,984 lb)
- Gross weight: 1,060 kg (2,337 lb)
- Powerplant: 1 × Vedeneyev M-14P 9-cylinder air-cooled radial piston engine, 270 kW (360 hp)
- Propellers: 3-bladed Foreign manufacture constant-speed propeller

Performance

- Maximum speed: 300 km/h (190 mph, 160 kn)
- Time to altitude: 3,000 m (9,800 ft) in 5 minutes 5 seconds; 6,000 m (20,000 ft) in 13 minutes 54 seconds
- Take-off run: 150 m (490 ft)
- Landing run: 250 m (820 ft)
