= Hongdu Yakovlev CJ-7 =

Type of aircraft

CJ-7

General information
- Type: Basic Trainer
- National origin: China
- Manufacturer: Hongdu Aviation Industry Group
- Designer: Yakovlev
- Primary user: People's Liberation Army Air Force

History
- First flight: late 2010
- Developed from: Yak-152

The Hongdu Yakovlev CJ-7 (L-7) is a two-seat piston engined trainer aircraft jointly developed by the Hongdu Aviation Industry Group and the Yakovlev, primarily for the Chinese People's Liberation Army Air Force (PLAAF).

== Design and development ==
The CJ-7 is a Hongdu/Yakovlev jointly developed, single-engine, two-seat, propeller-driven, trainer aircraft. Hongdu Aviation Industry Group is an aircraft manufacturer that is part of the Aviation Industry Corporation of China (AVIC). The aircraft is intended to be the sole primary trainer used by Chinese aviation schools. The CJ-7 is capable of basic flight training and surveillance missions. The CJ-7 trainer is expected to replace large numbers of Nanchang CJ-6 trainers in the People's Liberation Army Air Force.

The CJ-7 project started in 2006. At the end of 2010, the CJ-7 made its first flight. It is expected PLAAF will purchase 300–500 CJ-7s.

== Specifications (CJ-7) ==
General characteristics

- Crew: 2
- Max takeoff weight: 1,430 kg (3,153 lb)
- Powerplant: 1 × Vedeneyev M14X 9-cyl. air-cooled radial piston engine, 270 kW (360 hp)

Performance

- Maximum speed: 360 km/h (220 mph, 190 kn)
- Range: 1,300 km (810 mi, 700 nmi)
- Service ceiling: 8,000 m (26,000 ft)

== See also ==
Aircraft of comparable role, configuration, and era

- Nanchang CJ-6
- Yakovlev Yak-152
- CETC TA-20
