= Yakovlev Yak-4 =

Soviet light bomber during WWII (1941–1945)

Yak-4
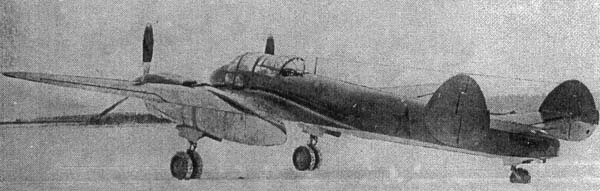

General information
- Type: Light bomber
- Manufacturer: Yakovlev
- Designer: Alexander Sergeyevich Yakovlev
- Primary user: VVS
- Number built: 90

History
- Introduction date: 1941
- First flight: 20 February 1940
- Retired: 1945
- Developed from: Yakovlev Yak-2

The Yakovlev Yak-4 (Service names Yak-4, BB-22bis (Blizhnij Bombardirovschik, russian ближний бомбардировщик, "short-range bomber")) was a Soviet light bomber used during World War II. It was developed from the Ya-22/Yak-2.

== Design and development ==
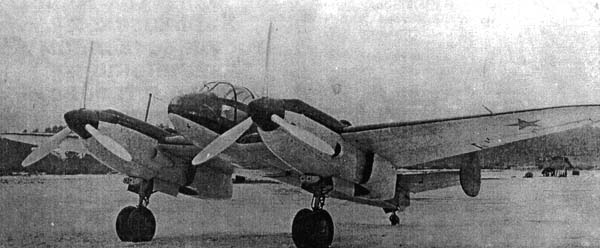
Yak-4

The Yak-4 was an improved version of the Yak-2 with more powerful Klimov M-105 engines and a number of other changes that were made to try to rectify the problems of the Yak-2. Two additional fuel tanks were added in the outer wings to bring the total capacity up to 180 litres (40 imp gal; 48 US gal) and the gunner's canopy was bulged to give him more room to use his 7.62 mm (0.300 in) ShKAS machine gun. The upper fuselage was redesigned to improve the gunner's field of fire and the oil coolers were relocated from the sides of the engine nacelles to the 'chin' position to improve their performance.

== Operators ==
Soviet Union

- VVS

== Specifications (Yak-4) ==
Yak-4

Data from The Osprey Encyclopaedia of Russian Aircraft 1875–1995

General characteristics

- Crew: 2
- Length: 10.18 m (33 ft 5 in)
- Wingspan: 14 m (45 ft 11 in)
- Wing area: 29.4 m^{2} (316 sq ft)
- Airfoil: Göttingen 387
- Empty weight: 4,560 kg (10,053 lb)
- Gross weight: 6,115 kg (13,481 lb)
- Powerplant: 2 × Klimov M-105 V-12 liquid-cooled piston engines, 821 kW (1,101 hp) each
- Propellers: 3-bladed constant-speed propellers

Performance

- Maximum speed: 533 km/h (331 mph, 288 kn)
- Range: 925 km (575 mi, 499 nmi)
- Service ceiling: 9,700 m (31,800 ft)

Armament

- 2 × 7.62 mm ShKAS machine guns
- up to 600 kg (1,300 lb) of bombs
