= Yakovlev Yak-2 =

Soviet WWII bomber and recon airplane

Yak-2
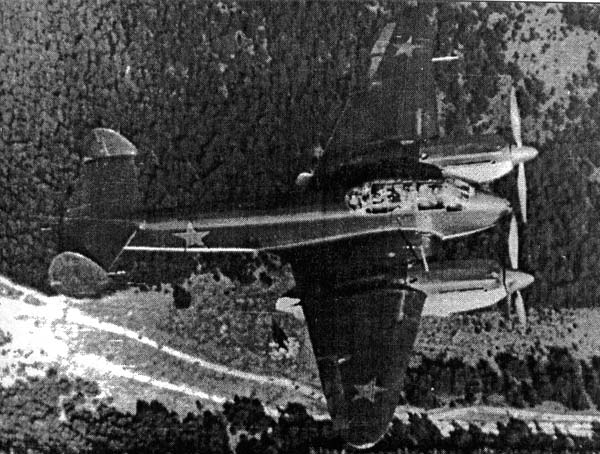
- A Yak-2 of the VVS in flight

General information
- Type: Light bomber
- Manufacturer: Yakovlev
- Designer: Alexander Sergeyevich Yakovlev
- Primary user: VVS
- Number built: 111

History
- Introduction date: 1940
- First flight: 1939
- Variant: Yakovlev Yak-4

The Yakovlev Yak-2 was a short-range Soviet light bomber/reconnaissance aircraft used during World War II. It was produced in small numbers, and most of them were destroyed during the opening stages of Operation Barbarossa.

== Design and development ==
The Yak-2 was initially known as the Ya-22, in the Yakovlev OKB numbering sequence, before it was redesignated as the Yak-2 in 1941. It was of mixed construction with wooden wings and center fuselage, duralumin forward fuselage, and steel tube framing in the rear fuselage with a wooden upper decking and fabric skin. The cockpit was at the very tip of the nose, but the navigator/gunner was in a compartment behind the trailing edge of the wing. The prototype was unarmed and no bomb shackles were fitted. It also lacked a radio and navigational equipment. It was, however, the fastest multi-engined aircraft in the Soviet Union, able to reach 567 km/h (352 mph) at 9,900 m (32,500 ft), not least because it lacked heavy military equipment.

Stalin ordered it into production, as the BB-22 (Russian: Ближний бомбардировщик, Blizhniy Bombardirovshchik— short-range bomber), on 15 March 1939 before it could be evaluated by the NII VVS (Naoochno-Issledovatel'skiy Institoot Voyenno-Vozdooshnykh Seel – Air Force Scientific Test Institute). Their tests were conducted in the early summer and concluded that the engine cooling systems were inadequate, the brakes were troublesome and the fuel system unreliable. The task of converting the aircraft to a bomber was formidable and included redesigning the center fuselage to accommodate the gunner/navigator immediately aft of the pilot and provision of two 7.62-millimetre (0.3 in) ShKAS machine guns, one for the gunner and the other fixed in the nose. The rear decking of the fuselage was hinged to pivot down to allow the rear gunner to use his gun.

Factory No. 1 produced the first pre-production BB-22 in December 1939, although it did not make its first flight until the following February. It was submitted for its service evaluation in March–April 1940 and proved to be a disappointment. Gross weight had increased 357 kg (787 lb) despite the reduction in fuel from 1,000 kg (2,200 lb) 600 kg (1,300 lb) and the maximum speed had declined to 515 km/h (320 mph) at 5,000 m (16,000 ft). The engine cooling system was still unsatisfactory and the undercarriage too weak. Longitudinal and lateral stability were also unsatisfactory which made it suitable only for well-trained pilots. The test programme report concluded that it was not combat-capable and reliable and that flights with a 400-kilogram (880 lb) bomb load could be dangerous to the crew.

A remediation program was begun which replaced the single-wheel main landing gear with two-wheeled units and the fuselage upper decking was cut down. Around the same time Factory No. 1 ceased production and Factory No. 81 in Moscow continued to work on the aircraft. Aircraft built by Factory No. 81 were of better quality because the surface finish was better and the engine cowlings and doors were more closely fitted to minimize drag. These improvements increased the speed by 10–20 km/h (6.2–12.4 mph). Development work continued and resulted in the Yak-4 when Klimov M-105 engines were fitted. A grand total of 201 Yak-2s were built before production was terminated in April 1941.

Aviation historian Bill Gunston reports that several prototype variants were built, including the R-12 reconnaissance aircraft which retained the original positioning of the crew, put three cameras in the fuselage and added a bomb bay for eight 20 kg (44 lb) FAB-20 bombs behind the pilot. Another was the I-29 or BB-22IS escort fighter with restored fuel and two 20 ShVAK cannon underneath the fuselage. But neither of these can be confirmed by other, post-Cold-War sources.

Russian aviation historian Yefim Gordon does mention a Yak-2KABB ground-attack variant which might have been confused with the I-29 because it had two ShKAS in the nose and two 20 mm (0.79 in) ShVAK cannon in a depressible ventral pack. Unfortunately no other details are available, although photos do exist. Another variant mentioned by Gordon was the BPB-22 (Blizhiy Pikeeruyushchiy Bombardirovshchik — short-range dive bomber) prototype that was fitted with two M-105 engines, dive brakes and an automatic dive entry/exit control system. It was first flown at the end of October 1940 although it crashed during the test programme when fuel unexpectedly cut out, but not before it was flown to a maximum speed of 558 km/h (347 mph).

== Operational history ==
When the Germans invaded the Soviet Union on 22 Jun 1941, 73 Yak-2s were in service, mostly with the 316th Reconnaissance Regiment in the Kiev Military District. Most of these were destroyed in the opening days of the campaign; the 316th mustered only four on 11 July.

== Variants ==
Ya-22
Prototype.
BB-22
Initial production with flush rear canopy
Yak-2
(VVS designation used in service of izdeliye 70 / BB-22 2M-103) Two-seat light bomber/reconnaissance aircraft.
BPB-22
(a.k.a. BPB-22 2M-105, BB-22PB) Blizhiy Pikeeruyushchiy Bombardirovshchik — short-range dive bomber. Prototype only.
Yak-2KABB
Prototype ground-attack aircraft fitted with the KABB-MV gun/bombing installation (KABB-MV - kombineerovannaya artillereeysko-bombardirovochnaya batareya Mozharovskovo i Venevidova - combined gun/bomb battery designed by Mozharovskiy and Venevidov), composed of a ventral cannon pack and a special glazed nose for bomb aiming equipment.
R-12
Prototype photographic reconnaissance aircraft.
I-29 or BB-22 IS
Experimental long-range fighter aircraft.
Yak-2bis / BB-22bis / izdeliye 70bis)
Prototype of the Yak-4 2M-105

== Users ==
Soviet Union

- VVS

== Specifications (Yak-2) ==

Data from The Osprey Encyclopaedia of Russian Aircraft 1875–1995

General characteristics

- Crew: 3
- Length: 9.34 m (30 ft 8 in)
- Wingspan: 14 m (45 ft 11 in)
- Wing area: 29.4 m^{2} (316 sq ft)
- Empty weight: 4,043 kg (8,913 lb)
- Gross weight: 5,380 kg (11,861 lb)
- Powerplant: 2 × Klimov M-103 V-12 liquid-cooled piston engines, 716 kW (960 hp) each
- Propellers: 3-bladed constant-speed propellers

Performance

- Maximum speed: 515 km/h (320 mph, 278 kn) at 5,200 m (17,100 ft)
- Range: 800 km (500 mi, 430 nmi)
- Service ceiling: 8,900 m (29,200 ft)
- Time to altitude: 7.7 minutes to 5,000 m (16,000 ft)
- Wing loading: 183 kg/m^{2} (37 lb/sq ft)
- Power/mass: 0.27 kW/kg (0.16 hp/lb)
- Take-off run: 500 m (1,600 ft)
- Landing run: 500 m (1,600 ft)

Armament

- 2 × 7.62 mm ShKAS machine guns
- up to 600 kg (1,300 lb) of bombs

== See also ==
Related development

- Yakovlev Yak-4

Aircraft of comparable role, configuration, and era

- Bloch MB.170
- Breda Ba.88
- Breguet 693
- Bristol Blenheim
- CANSA FC.20
- Caproni Ca.313
- Fiat CR.25
- Martin Maryland
- Potez 630
- Tupolev SB
