= Defence Assistance Organisation =

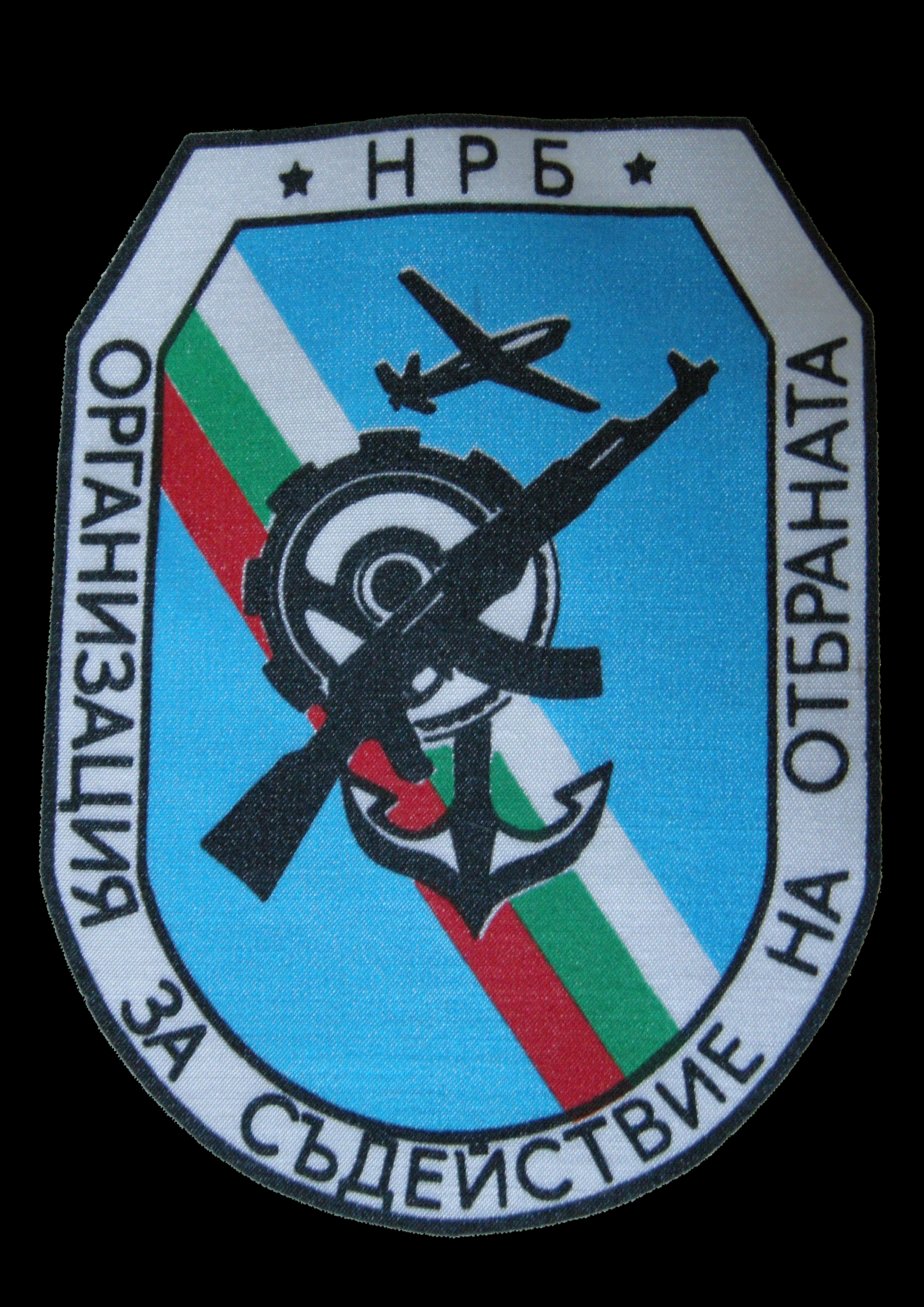
- DAO sleeve patch
- Abbreviation: DAO (ДОСО/ОСО)
- Formation: 1947
- Dissolved: 30 April 1992
- Type: Government
- Legal status: defunct
- Region served: National
- Affiliations: Bulgarian Communist Party

The Defence Assistance Organisation (Bulgarian: Организация за съдействие на отбраната, ОСО), initially the Voluntary Defence Assistance Organisation (Bulgarian: Доброволна организация за съдействие на отбраната, ДОСО) was a government-sponsored network of youth clubs in the People's Republic of Bulgaria.

It was created in 1947 as the People's Union of Sports and Technics, a government-sponsored body where Bulgarian youth could voluntarily engage in activities that were in some form related to the Bulgarian People's Army. The People's Union was reformed into the Voluntary Defence Assistance Organisation in 1951.

It primarily consisted of various interest clubs for practical education in driving and automotive mechanics, amateur radio, sailing, shooting, paragliding, flight training and airmanship, diving and many others. DAO clubs were part of a concentric nationwide network and were usually attached to factories, collective farms and schools. In exchange for a symbolic membership fee, DAO members could access all types of training for free.

The organisation was absorbed by the Komsomol in 1968 and ceased to exist. It was re-established in 1977 as the Organisation for Military Technical Preparation of the Population, and again reorganised as DAO under the Council of Ministers in 1982. It was finally disbanded in 1992 after the collapse of Communism.

== See also ==
- Dimitrovist Pioneer Organization "Septemberists"
- Gesellschaft für Sport und Technik, the East German equivalent
