= Yakovlev UT-3 =

UT-3

General information
- Type: Twin-engined trainer
- National origin: USSR
- Manufacturer: OKB Yakovlev
- Designer: A.S. Yakovlev
- Primary user: VVS
- Number built: ~21

History
- Variant: Yakovlev Ya-19

The Yakovlev UT-3, initially known as the AIR-17 and then Ya-17, was a twin-engine low-wing monoplane aircraft designed by Alexander Sergeyevich Yakovlev for the Soviet Air Force (VVS).

== Design and development ==
The UT-3 was to serve as a training aircraft for pilots of multi-engine aircraft and for training air gunners, bomb aimers, navigators and radio operators. The airframe was constructed largely of wood and fabric-covered mild steel tubing. The prototype was powered by imported French Renault 6Q-01 220 hp (160 kW) six-cylinder inline engines but production aircraft may have used the Voronezh MV-6 (Soviet-built Bengali 6 copy).

Testing was undertaken in 1938 and the aircraft was approved for construction as the UT-3. While the prototype had been fitted with 2x 7.62 mm (0.300 in) ShKAS machine guns and racks for four FAB-50 bombs, the production model was unarmed and more austere. Production was ordered in 1940 at two factories, No. 135 in Leningrad and No. 272 in Kazan. Only around thirty aircraft were built before orders were cancelled as the VVS high command decided to use multi-engine combat aircraft, modified for dual control, in place of dedicated training types.

== Operational history ==
Despite a seemingly bright future, the UT-3 was only produced in limited numbers, due to slow development and the cessation of MV-6 and Kossov MG-31F engine production.

== Variants ==
AIR-17
(a.k.a. Samolyet No.17, S-17, Ya-17, UT-3 or M-17) Prototype three-seat twin-engined bomber-trainer. Powered by two 220 hp (160 kW) Renault 6Q-01 engines driving Ratier 1363 variable pitch propellers.

UT-3 2MV-6 (3-seat)
Initial production of the armed three seat bomber trainer, powered by two Voronezh MV-6 engines driving AV-3 variable-pitch propellers. Only one aircraft built, of ten ordered, due to poor performance and stability.

UT-3 2MV-6 (2-seat)
Following the poor results from the 3-seat aircraft's flight tests, the aircraft was re-designed as a two-seat pilot trainer. Nine aircraft were built and sent to service units for testing, with poor results due to design faults and poor manufacturing standards. Production was transferred to GAZ-47.

UT-3 2MV-6 (2-seat GAZ-47)
At GAZ-47 changes were made to address the short-comings revealed in the service tests, which were only partly successful. Only eight aircraft were built to this standard.

UT-3 'standard setter for 1941'
(a.k.a. S-17A, Ya-17, UT-3 2MV-6A or UT-3M) Optimised as a conversion trainer, the instructor sat offset to starboard behind the trainee who sat offset to port, under a common canopy. The undercarriage was now fixed and power was supplied by 2x 220 hp (160 kW) Voronezh MV-6A engines, mounted on extended engine mounts to retain the centre of gravity in the safe zone. One aircraft built.

UT-3 with MG-31F engines
A projected version powered by 2x 350 hp (260 kW) Kossov MG-31F 9-cylinder radial engines, (not built).

UT-3 'standard setter no.2
The standard setter no.1 fitted with twin fins and rudders and sweptback outer wing panels, (not built).

UTPB
(uchebno-trenirovochnyy pikeeruyushchiy bombardirovshchik – dive bomber trainer) A projected dive bomber trainer to have been fitted with dive brakes under the wings, (not built).

Ya-19
(a.k.a. S-19, AIR-19) A civil transport derivative of the UT-3 using the wings, tail, undercarriage and engines of the UT-3 married to a new fuselage with a two-crew cockpit and cabin with sets for five passengers, (one built).

== Operators ==
Soviet Union

- VVS

== Specifications (UT-3 2MV6A) ==
Data from OKB Yakovlev, Yakovlev aircraft since 1924

General characteristics

- Crew: 2
- Length: 10.83 m (35 ft 6 in)
- Wingspan: 15 m (49 ft 3 in)
- Wing area: 33.42 m^{2} (359.7 sq ft)
- Empty weight: 2,042 kg (4,502 lb)
- Max takeoff weight: 2,627 kg (5,792 lb)
- Fuel capacity: 350 kg (770 lb) fuel, 32 kg (71 lb) oil
- Powerplant: 2 × Voronezh MV-6 6-cylinder inverted air-cooled in-line piston engines, 160 kW (220 hp) each
- Propellers: 2-bladed AV-3

Performance

- Maximum speed: 260 km/h (160 mph, 140 kn) *Landing speed: 95 km/h (59 mph; 51 kn)
- Range: 1,050 km (650 mi, 570 nmi)
- Service ceiling: 6,200 m (20,300 ft)
- Take-off run: 245 m (804 ft)
- Landing run: 115 m (377 ft)
