= Yakovlev AIR-9 =

AIR-9
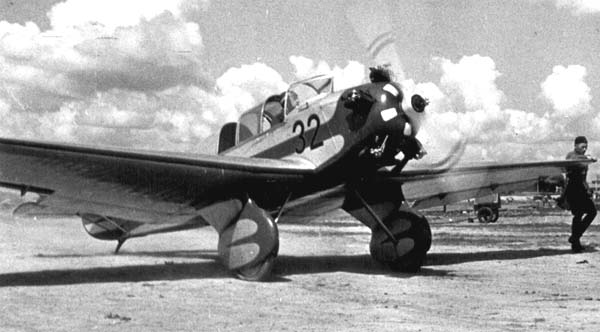
- The AIR-9bis, in later form, without cowling and with undercarriage strut trousers

General information
- Type: 2-seat sport aircraft
- National origin: USSR
- Designer: Aleksander Sergeyevich Yakovlev
- Number built: 1 (possibly more)

History
- First flight: 1934

The Yakovlev AIR-9 / AIR-9bis was a 2-seat sport aircraft designed and built in the USSR during the early 1930s.

== Design and development ==
From 1933 Yakovlev and his design team developed a 2-seat low-wing monoplane sport aircraft with open cockpits, wooden wings, welded steel tube fuselage, powered by a Shvetsov M-11 engine. Fitted with landing flaps and automatic leading-edge slats, the AIR-9 design was submitted to a safe aircraft design competition, but was not proceeded with.

The original AIR-9 design was re-worked in 1934 to include enclosed cockpits, but dispensing with the automatic slats. The tandem cockpits were fitted with sliding canopies; the forward canopy slid rearwards over the fixed centre canopy section and the rear canopy slid forwards under the centre-section.

The structure of the AIR-9 followed Yavovlev's previous designs with wooden plywood and fabric covered wings, welded steel tube fabric-covered fuselage and Duralumin fabric covered tail surfaces. The fixed spatted main undercarriage was supported by struts, later fitted with trousers as well as spats, with a fixed tail-skid or tailwheel (as exhibited at the 1935 Milan airshow).

The AIR-9 was powered by a single 100 hp (75 kW) Shvetsov M-11 five-cylinder air-cooled radial driving a fixed pitch 2-bladed wooden propeller, variously fitted with individual exhaust stacks, collector ring and Townend ring cowling.

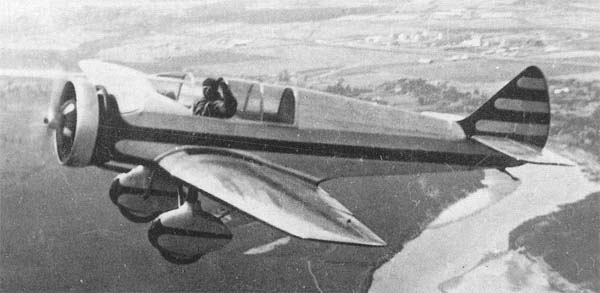
The AIR-9bis in flight, pilotted by Piontkovskii

=== AIR-9bis ===
In 1935 the AIR-9 was modified, or a second aircraft built, with a forward sloping windshield and re-designated AIR-9bis. The large number of variations in configuration suggest that there were more than one aircraft, but this cannot be confirmed.

== Operational history ==
The AIR-9bis was displayed at the 1935 Paris and Milan airshows, and in 1937, was flown by I.N. Vishnevskaya and Ye.M. Mednikova to set a women's altitude record in the FAI Class C category.

== Variants ==
AIR-9
The original open cockpit 2-seat low-wing monoplane sport aircraft design, with split flaps and automatic leading edge slats; not proceeded with.
AIR-9
The original design reworked with closed cockpits and other refinements but without automatic slats. At least one built, at some stage seen with racing number 31.
AIR-9bis
Further modifications prompted re-designation to AIR-9bis, introducing a forward sloping windshield and undercarriage trousers. One converted from the AIR-9 or possibly several new built aircraft, seen wearing racing number 32.

== Specifications (AIR-9bis) ==
Data from OKB Yakovlev, Yakovlev aircraft since 1924

General characteristics

- Crew: 2
- Length: 6.97 m (22 ft 10 in)
- Wingspan: 10.2 m (33 ft 6 in)
- Wing area: 16.87 m^{2} (181.6 sq ft)
- Empty weight: 495 kg (1,091 lb)
- Max takeoff weight: 768 kg (1,693 lb)
- Fuel capacity: 63.5 kg (140 lb) fuel; 17.5 kg (39 lb) oil
- Powerplant: 1 × Shvetsov M-11 5-cylinder air-cooled radial piston engine, 75 kW (100 hp)
- Propellers: 2-bladed wooden fixed pitch propeller

Performance

- Maximum speed: 215 km/h (134 mph, 116 kn) *Landing speed: 65 km/h (40 mph; 35 kn)
- Cruise speed: 195 km/h (121 mph, 105 kn)
- Range: 695 km (432 mi, 375 nmi)
- Service ceiling: 6,080 m (19,950 ft)
- Time to altitude: 1,000 m (3,300 ft) in 4 minutes 48 seconds, 3,000 m (9,800 ft) in 16 minutes 24 seconds
- Take-off run: 80 m (260 ft)
- Landing run: 90 m (300 ft)
