= List of aircraft (Y) =

This is a list of aircraft in alphabetical order beginning with 'Y'.

== Y ==
=== Y2Fly ===
(Point Harbor, North Carolina, United States)

- Y2Fly Seahawk

=== Yackey Aircraft Co. ===
- Yackey A
- Yackey Sport
- Yackey BRL-12
- Yackey Transport
- Yackey Cruiser
- Yackey Scout
- Yackey Monoplane

=== Yager ===
(Karl Yager)

- Yager KY-01
- Yager KY-02
- Yager KY-03 Libellula

=== Yakovlev ===
(Soviet Union)

- Yakovlev AIR-1 biplane trainer
- Yakovlev AIR-2 improved AIR-1
- Yakovlev AIR-3 general aviation monoplane based on the AIR-2
- Yakovlev AIR-4 improved AIR-3
- Yakovlev AIR-5 cabin monoplane
- Yakovlev AIR-6 (1930) four-seat, high-wing transport project derived from the AIR-5
- Yakovlev AIR-6 three-seat light utility aircraft; scaled-down AIR-5
- Yakovlev AIR-7 sport aircraft
- Yakovlev AIR-8 military liaison version of AIR-3
- Yakovlev AIR-9 sport aircraft
- Yakovlev AIR-10 (1934) high-wing, light passenger transport project; AIR-5 evolution
- Yakovlev AIR-10 two-seat trainer based on the AIR-9, precursor of UT-2
- Yakovlev AIR-11/LT-1 three-seat touring aircraft
- Yakovlev AIR-12 long-range sport aircraft
- Yakovlev AIR-13 projected twin-engine racing aircraft
- Yakovlev AIR-14 prototype for UT-1
- Yakovlev AIR-15/UT-15 projected racing aircraft
- Yakovlev AIR-16/LT-2 prototype cabin monoplane tourer; four-seat derivative of AIR-10
- Yakovlev AIR-17/UT-3 twin-engine, three-seat crew trainer; prototype for UT-3
- Yakovlev AIR-18 UT-1 with Renault Bengali engine, closed canopy and retractable landing gear
- Yakovlev AIR-19/Ya-19 prototype five-seat light transport derived from the UT-3
- Yakovlev AIR-20/Ya-20 two-seat trainer, prototype for UT-2
- Yakovlev AIR-21 projected 'buried' cockpit racing aircraft
- Yakovlev Ya-21/UT-21 single-seat, high-speed fighter-trainer/sport aircraft derived from the UT-1
- Yakovlev AIR-22 projected two-seat low-wing sports plane
- Yakovlev I-29/BB-22 prototype multirole combat aircraft
- Yakovlev AIR-23 projected single-seat low-wing sports plane
- Yakovlev AIR-24 projected two-seat development of AIR-23
- Yakovlev AIR-25 projected single seat, low-wing fighter-trainer; open cockpit version of UT-21
- Yakovlev BB-22
- Yakovlev EG experimental co-axial rotor helicopter; also known as Sh and Yak-M11FR-1
- Yakovlev LT-1
- Yakovlev LT-2
- Yakovlev UT-1
- Yakovlev UT-2
- Yakovlev UT-3
- Yakovlev UT-21
- Yakovlev Yak-1 single-seat fighter
  - Yakovlev Yak-3/I-33 single-seat fighter
  - Yakovlev Yak-7 two-seat trainer/fighter
  - Yakovlev Yak-9 single-seat multipurpose fighter
  - Yakovlev Yak-11 advanced trainer developed from the Yak-3
  - Yakovlev Yak-15 jet fighter developed from the Yak-3
  - Yakovlev Yak-17 jet fighter; improved Yak-15
  - Yakovlev Yak-21 two-seat dual-control trainer version of Yak-15
  - Yakovlev Yak-23 jet fighter developed from the Yak-17
- Yakovlev Yak-2 short-range light bomber/reconnaissance
- Yakovlev Yak-4 short-range light bomber; improved Yak-2
- Yakovlev Yak-5 experimental fighter-trainer developed from the UT-2
- Yakovlev Yak-6 twin-engine utility aircraft
- Yakovlev Yak-8 prototype utility aircraft; improved Yak-6
- Yakovlev Yak-10 light liaison aircraft developed from the AIR-6
- Yakovlev Yak-12 light multirole STOL aircraft
- Yakovlev Yak-13 low-wing monoplane derivative of Yak-10
- Yakovlev Yak-14 military transport glider
- Yakovlev Yak-16 prototype light transport aircraft
- Yakovlev Yak-17-RD10 one off prototype, unrelated to production Yak-17
- Yakovlev Yak-18 two-seat primary trainer
- Yakovlev Yak-18T four/five seat acrobatic utility aircraft
- Yakovlev Yak-19 prototype jet fighter
- Yakovlev Yak-20 experimental two-seat side-by-side trainer
- Yakovlev Yak-22 (1948) light multirole transport helicopter
- Yakovlev Yak-22 (1950) projected version of Yak-20 with M-4 engine
- Yakovlev Yak-24 twin-engine, tandem-rotor helicopter
- Yakovlev Yak-25 (1947) prototype jet fighter; lost to the La-15 and MiG-15
- Yakovlev Yak-25 twin-engine subsonic interceptor/reconnaissance
- Yakovlev Yak-26 supersonic tactical bomber developed from the Yak-25
- Yakovlev Yak-27 supersonic reconnaissance aircraft
- Yakovlev Yak-28 swept-wing, turbojet-powered multirole aircraft
- Yakovlev Yak-29 single-seat small jet fighter project
- Yakovlev Yak-30 (1948) experimental interceptor developed from the Yak-25; lost to the MiG-15
- Yakovlev Yak-30 (1960) prototype trainer; lost to the L-29 Delfín
- Yakovlev Yak-32 jet-powered sport aircraft; single-seat version of Yak-30
- Yakovlev Yak-33 multipurpose VTOL aircraft project
- Yakovlev Yak-36 VTOL demonstration aircraft
- Yakovlev Yak-38 VTOL strike aircraft
- Yakovlev Yak-39 multirole VTOL aircraft project developed from the Yak-38; cancelled in favor of the Yak-141
- Yakovlev Yak-40 (1948) experimental single-seat ramjet fighter
- Yakovlev Yak-40 three-engine regional jetliner
- Yakovlev Yak-41 alternate name for the Yak-141
- Yakovlev Yak-42 three-engine, mid-range narrow-body jetliner developed from the Yak-40
- Yakovlev Yak-43 proposed development of the Yak-41M with NK-321 engines
- Yakovlev Yak-44 proposed carrier-based twin-turboprop AEW aircraft
- Yakovlev Yak-45 proposed fighter; lost to the MiG-29
- Yakovlev Yak-46 proposed propfan version of the Yak-42
- Yakovlev Yak-47 projected two-seat, all-weather heavy fighter developed from the Yak-45
- Yakovlev Yak-48 projected twin-engine long-range business jet/regional carrier
- Yakovlev Yak-49
- Yakovlev Yak-50 (1949) experimental turbojet interceptor
- Yakovlev Yak-50 (1975) single-seat aerobatic/trainer aircraft
- Yakovlev Yak-52 primary trainer
- Yakovlev Yak-53 prototype single-seat aerobatic trainer, single-seat derivative of Yak-52
- Yakovlev Yak-54 aerobatic/sports aircraft
- Yakovlev Yak-55 aerobatic aircraft
- Yakovlev Yak-56 two-seat trainer based on the Yak-55M; cancelled in favor of the Yak-54
- Yakovlev Yak-57 single-seat aerobatic/sport aircraft project
- Yakovlev Yak-58 small multirole utility transport/business aircraft
- Yakovlev Yak-60 (1948) single-seat, swept-wing interceptor project
- Yakovlev Yak-60 projected tandem-rotor heavy-lift helicopter
- Yakovlev Yak-61 experimental reconnaissance UAV
- Yakovlev Yak-70 single-seat, swept-wing supersonic fighter project
- Yakovlev Yak-77 planned commuter jet
- Yakovlev Yak-100 single-engine transport helicopter
- Yakovlev Yak-104 (Yak-32)
- Yakovlev Yak-110
- Yakovlev Yak-112 civil utility aircraft
- Yakovlev Yak-118 six-seat multipurpose light aircraft based on the Yak-18T
- Yakovlev Yak-130 subsonic advanced trainer/light combat aircraft
- Yakovlev Yak-131 light attack version of Yak-130, intended as a Su-25 replacement
- Yakovlev Yak-132 light attack version of Yak-130
- Yakovlev Yak-133 special purpose light bomber/reconnaissance version of Yak-130
- Yakovlev Yak-140 prototype lightweight supersonic fighter
- Yakovlev Yak-141 prototype supersonic VTOL fighter
- Yakovlev Yak-142 Yak-42 derivative with upgraded Western avionics, spoilers and a larger cabin door
- Yakovlev Yak-144 projected AEW aircraft developed from the Yak-44E
- Yakovlev Yak-152 primary trainer
- Yakovlev Yak-200 prototype twin-engine trainer; lost to the Il-28U
- Yakovlev Yak-201 planned VTOL stealth fighter/interceptor
- Yakovlev Yak-210 navigator trainer version of Yak-200
- Yakovlev Yak-220 light transport aircraft based on the Yak-200
- Yakovlev Yak-242 further development of Yak-42M with two underwing engines; evolved into Irkut MC-21
- Yakovlev Yak-1000 supersonic technology demonstrator
- Hongdu Yakovlev CJ-7 piston-engine trainer; joint project with Hongdu
- Yakovlev 104 (Yak-30)
- Yakovlev 120 (Yak-25)
- Yakovlev 121 (Yak-25)
- Yakovlev 122 (Yak-25)
- Yakovlev 123 (Yak-26)
- Yakovlev 125 (Yak-26)
- Yakovlev 129 (Yak-28)
- Yakovlev MC-21 (formerly Irkut MC-21)
- Yakovlev SJ-100 (formerly Sukhoi Superjet 100)
- Irkut A-002
- Irkut 111

=== Yasui ===
(Yasui Hiko Kenkyusho - Yasui Flying Research Studio)

- Yasui TN-6 Kai
- Yasui No.3

=== Yates ===
(George Yates, Beaverton, Oregon; St Helens, Oregon, United States)

- Yates Gilbert Experimental
- Yates Oregon O
- Yates Stiper
- Greenwood-Yates Twin

=== Yatsenko ===
- Yatsenko I-28

=== Yench'u ===
- Yench'u D-2
- Yench'u XP-1

=== Yeoman Aviation ===
- Yeoman YA-1 Cropmaster 250

=== Yermolayev ===
- Yermolayev Yer-2

=== Yetti Air ===
(Czech Republic)

- Yetti J-03

=== Yokosuka ===
(Yokosuka First Naval Air Technical Arsenal (第一海軍航空技術廠)) (a.k.a. Kugisho and Yokosho)

- Yokosuka Experimental Japanese-Navy-Type Seaplane
- Yokosuka Experimental Kusho 6-shi Special Bomber (aka Tokushu Bakugekiki - Special Bomber), construction at Nakajima
- Yokosuka Experimental Kusho 8-shi Special Bomber (aka Tokushu Bakugekiki - Special Bomber)
- Yokosuka Experimental Kusho 12-shi Flying-boat
- Yokosuka Experimental Yokosho Nakajima Tractor Seaplane
- Yokosuka Experimental Yokosho Twin-engined Seaplane
- Yokosuka Experimental Yokosho Ho-go Otsu-gata Seaplane
- Yokosuka Experimental Yokosho Ho-go Small Seaplane
- Yokosuka Experimental Tatsu-go Reconnaissance Seaplane
- Yokosho-Type Reconnaissance Seaplane
- Yokosuka B3Y
- Yokosuka B4Y
- Yokosuka D2Y
- Yokosuka D3Y Myojo
- Yokosuka D4Y
- Yokosuka D5Y
- Yokosuka E1Y
- Yokosuka E5Y
- Yokosuka E6Y
- Yokosuka E14Y
- Yokosuka H5Y
- Yokosuka H7Y
- Yokosuka K1Y
- Yokosuka K2Y
- Yokosuka K4Y
- Yokosuka K5Y
- Yokosuka L3Y
- Yokosuka MXY1 (Built by Watanabe
- Yokosuka MXY2
- Yokosuka MXY3
- Yokosuka MXY4
- Yokosuka MXY5
- Yokosuka MXY6
- Yokosuka MXY7 Ohka
- Yokosuka MXY8 Akigusa
- Yokosuka MXY9 Shuka
- Yokosuka MXY10
- Yokosuka MXY11
- Yokosuka P1Y Ginga
  - Navy Bomber Ginga Ground Decoy
- Yokosuka R1Y Seiun - Blue cloud (Gyoun - Dawn cloud)
- Yokosuka R2Y Keiun - Beautiful Cloud
- Yokosuka Navy Short Reconnaissance Seaplane
- Yokosuka Ro-go Ko-gata, also known as "Yokosho-Type Reconnaissance Seaplane"
- Yokosuka Navy Yokosho I-go Ko-gata Seaplane Trainer
- Yokosuka Navy Yokosho 1-go Reconnaissance Seaplane
- Yokosuka Navy Yokosho 2-go Reconnaissance Seaplane
- Yokosuka Navy Yokosho 2-go Kai Reconnaissance Seaplane
- Yokosuka Navy F.5 Flying-boat - licence built Felixstowe F.5
- Yokosuka Navy No. 2 Reconnaissance Seaplane
- Yokosuka Navy Avro 504 Trainer - licence built Avro 504
- Yokosuka Navy Type Hansa Reconnaissance Seaplane
- Yokosuka Navy Ha-go Small Seaplane
- Yokosuka Navy Type Ka Seaplane
- Yokosuka Navy Type Mo Small Seaplane (Maurice Farman Hydro-Aeroplane II)
- Yokosuka Navy Type Mo Large Seaplane
- Yokosuka Navy Type 0 Small Reconnaissance Seaplane
- Yokosuka Navy Type 1 Attack Bomber Ground Decoy
- Yokosuka Navy Type 1 Target Aircraft
- Yokosuka Navy Type 2 Carrier Reconnaissance Aircraft
- Yokosuka Navy Type 3 Primary Trainer
- Yokosuka Navy Type 10 Reconnaissance Seaplane
- Yokosuka Navy Type 13 Trainer
- Yokosuka Navy Type 13 Training Seaplane
- Yokosuka Navy Type 14 Reconnaissance Seaplane
- Yokosuka Navy Type 14 Modified Transport Seaplane
- Yokosuka Navy Type 90 Reconnaissance Seaplane
- Yokosuka Navy Type 90 Training Seaplane
- Yokosuka Navy Type 91 Intermediate Trainer
- Yokosuka Navy Type 91-1 Reconnaissance Seaplane
- Yokosuka Navy Type 92 Carrier Attack Bomber
- Yokosuka Navy Type 93 Advanced Trainer
- Yokosuka Navy Type 93 Intermediate Trainer
- Yokosuka Navy Type 96 Carrier Attack Bomber
- Yokosuka Navy Type 96 Transport
- Yokosuka Navy Type 99 Bomber Trainer Myojo Model 22
- Yokosuka Navy Type 99 Flying boat
- Yokosuka Navy Bomber Ginga
- Yokosuka Navy Carrier Bomber Suisei
- Yokosuka Navy Experimental 9-shi Carrier Attack Bomber
- Yokosuka Navy Experimental 9-shi Flying Boat
- Yokosuka Navy Experimental 13-shi Carrier Bomber Suisei
- Yokosuka Navy Experimental 15-Shi Night Fighter Byakko
- Yokosuka Navy Experimental 15-Shi Night Fighter Kyokko
- Yokosuka Navy Experimental 17-Shi Carrier Reconnaissance Aircraft Seiun
- Yokosuka Navy Experimental 17-Shi Land Reconnaissance Aircraft Gyo-un
- Yokosuka Navy Experimental 18-Shi Reconnaissance Aircraft Keiun
- Yokosuka Navy Experimental Ente-type Glider
- Yokosuka Navy Experimental Reconnaissance Aircraft Keiun Kai
- Yokosuka Navy Experimental Test Aircraft
- Yokosuka Navy Experimental Target Glider
- Yokosuka Navy Experimental Trainer Shuka
- Yokosuka Navy Experimental Training Glider Akigusa
- Yokosuka Navy Experimental Transport Glider
- Yokosuka Navy Jet Bomber Tenga
- Navy Special Attacker Ohka

=== Yomiuri ===
Itogawa Eizo and Horikoshi Jiro sponsored by Yomiuri Shimbun, Japan

- Yomiuri Y-1

=== Yordanov (aircraft designer) ===
- Yordanov A-1

=== York ===
(Leon York, Midland, Texas, United States.)

- York June Bug
- York Y-2

=== York ===
(C.H. York)

- XHC-22 Yorkopter

=== Young ===
(Ed Young)

- Young Skyheater

=== Young ===
(J J Young, Oklahoma City, Oklahoma, United States)

- Young 1922 Helicopter

=== Young ===
(Lewis G. Young, New Jersey, United States)

- Young 1916 Taube
- Young Gull Wing monoplane

=== Young ===
(Richard E Young, Ypsilanti, Michigan, United States)

- Young Model A
- Young Special

=== Youngcopter ===
(Björn Jung )

- Youngcopter Neo

=== Youngman-Baynes ===
- Youngman-Baynes High Lift

=== Younkin-Dake ===
- Younkin-Dake Mullicoupe

=== Yue ===
(Fong Yue (also seen as Fung Joe Guey and Feng Ru), Oakland, CA)

- Yue 1909 No.1
- Yue 1909 No.2

=== Yuneec International ===
(China)

- Yuneec International E430
- Yuneec International EPac
- Yuneec International EViva
- Yuneec International ESpyder
- Yuneec International ETrike

=== Yunker ===
((George C) Yunker Aircraft Co, 115 Osage St, Wichita, Kansas, United States)

- Yunker Y-1
- Yunker Y-2

=== Yunshuji ===
- Yunshuji-1

=== Yutz ===
(Joe Yutz, Pottsville, Pennsylvania, United States)

- Yutz Parasol
