= Yokosuka (disambiguation) =

Yokosuka is a city in Kanagawa Prefecture, Japan. Yokosuka may also refer to:

== Places ==
- Yokosuka Line, a railway line connecting the city to other places
- Yokosuka Sogo High School, a secondary school located in the city
- Yokosuka Domain, a Japanese feudal domain of the Edo period, located in Tōtōmi Province
  - Yokosuka Castle, a castle central to the domain

=== Naval Facilities ===
- United States Fleet Activities Yokosuka, a United States naval base located next to the city, beginning in 1945
- JMSDF Yokosuka District Force) a modern naval district of Japan's territorial waters (see Japan Maritime Self-Defense Force#Organization, formations and structure)
- JMSDF Yokosuka Naval Base), which hosts the headquarters of the Japanese Maritime Self Defense Force as well as several major units assigned to the district.
- Yokosuka Naval District was a historical administrative district of the pre-war Imperial Japanese Navy.
- Naval Air Technical Arsenal at Yokosuka, an aircraft manufacturer located in the city from the 1910s to the 1930s.
- Yokosuka Naval Arsenal, a shipyard located outside the city from the 1860s to 1945
- Yokosuka Naval Airfield a WWII-era airfield

== Aircraft ==
- Yokosuka B3Y, a carrier-based torpedo bomber of the 1930s
- Yokosuka B4Y, a carrier attack aircraft used by the Imperial Japanese Navy Air Service
- Yokosuka D3Y, a two-seat dive bomber
- Yokosuka E1Y, a Japanese floatplane of the 1920s
- Yokosuka E5Y, a single-engine Japanese seaplane used for reconnaissance
- Yokosuka E14Y, an Imperial Japanese Navy reconnaissance seaplane
- Yokosuka H5Y, a flying boat
- Yokosuka K4Y, a floatplane trainer of the 1930s
- Yokosuka K5Y, a two-seat unequal-span biplane trainer
- Yokosuka MXY7 Ohka, a purpose-built, rocket powered aircraft
- Yokosuka MXY8, a training glider
- Yokosuka MXY9, a projected development of the MXY8 training glider
- Yokosuka P1Y, a twin-engine, land-based bomber developed for the Japanese Imperial Navy in World War II
- Yokosuka R2Y, a prototype reconnaissance aircraft built in Japan late in World War II

== People ==
- Susumu Yokosuka (横須賀ススム, b. 1978 as Susumu Mochizuki), a Japanese professional wrestler from the city of Yokosuka
