= List of aircraft of the Imperial Japanese Navy =

The following is a list of aircraft of the Imperial Japanese Navy Air Service (1912–1945). The Imperial Japanese Navy Air Service was in existence from its inception in 1912 until its dissolution in 1945.

== World War I ==
Adopted prior to 1918

=== Bombers ===
- Farman MF.11 1914 Ship-based light bomber floatplane

=== Reconnaissance and liaison ===
- Farman MF.7 Longhorn 1913 light bomber and reconnaissance aircraft
- Yokosho Ro-gō Kō-gata 1918 reconnaissance seaplane

== Interwar ==
Adopted between 1918 and 1937

=== Fighters ===
- Gloster Sparrowhawk 1921 carrier-borne biplane fighter
- Mitsubishi 1MF 1923 carrier-borne biplane fighter (Type 10 Fighter)
- Nakajima A1N 1930 carrier-borne biplane fighter
- Nakajima A2N 1932 carrier-borne biplane fighter
- Nakajima A4N 1935 carrier-borne biplane fighter
- Mitsubishi A5M Claude 1937 Navy carrier-based fighter

=== Bombers ===
- Mitsubishi 1MT 1922 carrier torpedo bomber
- Mitsubishi B1M 1923 carrier torpedo bomber
- Mitsubishi B2M 1932 carrier torpedo bomber
- Kugisho B3Y 1932 carrier torpedo bomber
- Mitsubishi G3M Nell 1934 Navy land-based bomber
- Aichi D1A Susie 1934 Navy carrier dive bomber
- Yokosuka B4Y Jean 1935 biplane torpedo bomber

=== Reconnaissance and liaison ===
- Mitsubishi 2MR 1923 carrier reconnaissance aircraft (Type 10 Carrier Reconnaissance Aircraft)

=== Trainers ===
- Yokosho K1Y 1924 primary trainer
- Yokosuka K2Y 1928 primary trainer
- Kyushu K10W Oak Type 2 intermediate trainer.
- Mitsubishi K3M Pine 1930 naval crew trainer.

=== Transports ===
- Hitachi LXG1 1934 (Liaison and communication)

=== Flying boats and seaplanes ===
- Yokosuka E1Y 1926 reconnaissance seaplane
- Hiro H1H 1926 flying boat
- Nakajima E2N 1929 reconnaissance seaplane
- Hiro H2H 1929 flying boat
- Aichi E3A 1930 reconnaissance seaplane
- Nakajima E4N 1930 reconnaissance seaplane
- Yokosuka E5Y 1930 reconnaissance seaplane
- Kawanishi H3K 1932 flying boat
- Kawanishi E5K 1932 reconnaissance seaplane
- Yokosuka E6Y 1932 submarine based floatplane
- Kawanishi E7K Alf 1933 reconnaissance seaplane
- Hiro H4H 1933 flying boat
- Nakajima E8N Dave 1934 reconnaissance seaplane
- Kawanishi H6K Mavis 1936 recon. flying boat; formerly - Navy Type 97 Flying Boat
- Mitsubishi F1M Pete 1936 observation seaplane
- Yokosuka H5Y Cherry 1936 flying boat
- Aichi E10A 1936 reconnaissance flying boat

== World War II ==
Second Sino-Japanese War, Pacific War, and China-Burma-India theatre

=== Fighters ===
- Mitsubishi A6M Zero 零戦 "Reisen" Zeke 1939 Navy carrier fighter (type 0), the "Zero"
- Mitsubishi A7M 烈風 "Reppu" Sam 1944 Navy carrier-based fighter
- Seversky A8V1 Type S Two Seat Fighter Late 1930s Two-seat Seversky P-35
- Nakajima J1N 月光 "Gekko" Irving 1941 Navy land-based night fighter
- Mitsubishi J2M 雷電 "Raiden" Jack 1942 Navy land-based interceptor
- Nakajima J5N 天雷 "Tenrai" 1944 Navy land-based interceptor
- Kyushu J7W 震電 "Shinden" 1945 Navy interceptor
- Mitsubishi J8M / Ki-200 秋水 "Shusui" 1945 Navy and Army rocket interceptor, based on the Messerschmitt Me 163
- Nakajima J9Y 橘花 "Kikka" 1945 Experimental Navy jet-powered fighter
- Kawanishi N1K-J 紫電 "Shiden" 1942 Navy ground-based derivative of the N1K
- Kawanishi P1Y2-S 極光 1944 Navy night-fighter derivative of the Yokosuka P1Y
- Aichi S1A 電光 "Denko" 1945 Navy night fighter

=== Bombers ===
- Mitsubishi B5M Mabel 1937 Navy carrier torpedo bomber
- Nakajima B5N Kate 1937 Japanese Navy carrier torpedo bomber
- Aichi D3A Val 1938 Navy carrier dive bomber
- Mitsubishi G4M Betty 1939 Japanese land-based bomber
- Yokosuka D4Y 彗星 "Suisei" Judy 1940 dive bomber
- Nakajima B6N 天山 "Tenzan" Jill 1941 Navy torpedo bomber
- Aichi B7A 流星 "Ryusei" Grace 1942 Navy carrier torpedo bomber
- Kyushu Q1W 東海 "Tokai" Lorna 1943 Navy anti-submarine patrol bomber
- Yokosuka P1Y 銀河 "Ginga" Frances 1943 medium bomber
- Nakajima G8N 連山 "Renzan" Rita 1944 Navy long-range heavy bomber
- Tachikawa Ki-74 Patsy 1944 bomber, reconnaissance

=== Reconnaissance and liaison ===
- Mitsubishi C5M 1937 Babs reconnaissance plane
- Yokosuka D4Y1-C 彗星 "Suisei" Judy 1940 reconnaissance plane
- Nakajima C6N 彩雲 "Saiun" Myrt 1943 Navy reconnaissance plane
- Yokosuka R2Y 景雲 "Keiun" 1945 reconnaissance plane

=== Transports ===
- Kawanishi H6K2/4-L 1938 (Transport Flying boat)
- Kawanishi H6K3 1939 (Transport Flying boat)
- Kawanishi H8K2-L Seiku (Transport version of H8K)
- Kawanishi E11K1 (Merchant Transport Hydroplane)
- Mitsubishi K3M3-L "Pine" (Light Transport)
- Mitsubishi L3Y1/2 (Armed Transport)
- Mitsubishi G6M1/2-L (Armed Transport)
- Mitsubishi L4M1 (Personnel Transport)
- Nakajima C2N1 (Light transport)
- Nakajima L1N1 (Personnel Transport)
- Nakajima G5N2-L Shinzan "Liz" (Merchant transport)
- Nihon L7P1 (Light amphibious transport)
- Showa/Nakajima L2D2 "Tabby" (Merchants and Personnel Transport)
- Yokosuka H5Y1 "Cherry" (Transport Hydroplane)
- Kyushu K10W11 "Oak" (liaison and Communications)
- Nakajima A4N1 (liaisons)
- Aichi E13A1 "Jake" (liaisons and officer transport)

=== Flying boats and seaplanes ===
- Aichi E11A Laura 1937 reconnaissance flying boat
- Yokosuka E14Y Glenn 1939 submarine based floatplane
- Aichi E13A Jake 1940
- Aichi H9A 1940
- Kawanishi H8K Emily 1941 Flying Boat
- Kawanishi H8K2-L 晴空 "Seiku" Emily Flying Boat
- Kawanishi E15K 紫雲 "Shiun" Norm 1941 reconnaissance seaplane
- Kawanishi N1K 強風 "Kyofu" Rex 1942 floatplane fighter
- Aichi E16A 瑞雲 "Zuiun" Paul 1942 reconnaissance seaplane
- Nakajima A6M2-N Rufe 1942 Mitsubishi Zero floatplane version
- Aichi M6A 晴嵐 "Seiran" 1943 submarine-based seaplane

=== Purpose-built special attack aircraft ===
- Yokosuka MXY7 桜花 "Ohka" Baka 1944 manned flying bomb

== See also ==
- List of military aircraft of Japan
