= I28 =

I28 may refer to:

- Japanese submarine I-28, a submarine of the Imperial Japanese Navy
- Yatsenko I-28, a 1930s Soviet single-seat fighter
- HMS Chesterfield (I28), a destroyer of the Royal Navy
