= Yatsenko =

Yatsenko or Jacenko or Iatcenko (Ukrainian: Яценко) is a gender-neutral Ukrainian surname that may refer to:

- Andriy Yatsenko (born 1997), Ukrainian freestyle wrestler
- Leonid Yatsenko (born 1954), Ukrainian physicist
- Lyn Jacenko (born 1953), Australian long jumper
- Oleksandr Yatsenko (born 1985), Ukrainian footballer
- Olena Yatsenko (born 1977), Ukrainian handball player
- Vlad Yatsenko (born 1983), British entrepreneur and software engineer
- Roxy Jacenko (born 1980), Australian businesswoman, socialite and author
- Polina Iatcenko (born 2003), Russian tennis player

== See also ==
- Yatsenko I-28, a 1930s Soviet single-seat fighter plane
