= Yakovlev Ya-21 =

Ya-21

General information
- Type: single-seat fighter-trainer / high-speed sport aircraft
- National origin: USSR
- Manufacturer: OKB Yakovlev
- Number built: 1

History
- First flight: September 1937
- Developed from: Yakovlev UT-1

The Yakovlev Ya-21, (aka UT-21, No.21 or No.25), was a single-seat high-speed sport aircraft / fighter-trainer designed and built in the Soviet Union in the late 1930s.

== Design and development ==
The Ya-21 was derived from the Yakovlev UT-1, in similar fashion to the Yakovlev AIR-18, by replacing the Shvetsov M-11 radial with an imported 220 hp (160 kW) Renault 6Q-01 inverted 6-cylinder in-line engine. The rear cockpit was enclosed with an aft-sliding canopy, a fixed trousered and spatted undercarriage with spring steel tail-skid was fitted, as well as split flaps and a fixed, forward firing, synchronised 7.62mm ShKAS machine gun in the forward fuselage decking. Plans for re-engining the Ya-25 with a Kossov MG-31F 9-cylinder radial engine were cancelled, due to changing priorities of the customer.

The sole Ya-21 was converted into the No.25 prototype by substituting the imported Renault with a 220 hp (160 kW) Voronezh MV-6 (Renault Bengali copy). The cockpit also differed in having opaque side panels and no sliding hood, with a deeper windshield to house the gunsight.

Production of both the Ya-21 or No.25 was not implemented due to the Yakovlev OKB focusing on combat aircraft, such as the Yakovlev BB-22 and Yakovlev I-26.

== Variants ==
Ya-21
(aka UT-21, No. 21) The sole prototype ( of two intended) fighter-trainer / high-speed sport aircraft powered by a 220 hp (160 kW) Renault 6Q-01 engine.
No.25
The Ya-21 converted to have open cockpit and powered by a 220 hp (160 kW) Voronezh MV-6 engine.

== Specifications (Ya-21) ==
Data from OKB Yakovlev, Yakovlev aircraft since 1924

General characteristics

- Crew: 1
- Length: 6.4 m (21 ft 0 in)
- Wingspan: 7.8 m (25 ft 7 in)
- Height: 2.05 m (6 ft 9 in)
- Wing area: 9.58 m^{2} (103.1 sq ft)
- Airfoil: Göttingen 387
- Empty weight: 611 kg (1,347 lb)
- Max takeoff weight: 831 kg (1,832 lb)
- Fuel capacity: 120 kg (260 lb) / 170 L (45 US gal; 37 imp gal) fuel; 12 kg (26 lb) oil
- Powerplant: 1 × Renault 6Q-01 6-cylinder inverted air-cooled in-line piston engine, 160 kW (220 hp)
- Propellers: 2-bladed fixed pitch wooden propeller, 2.1 m (6 ft 11 in) diameter

Performance

- Maximum speed: 290 km/h (180 mph, 160 kn) at sea level 322 km/h (200 mph; 174 kn) at 2,000 m (6,600 ft)
- Landing speed: 85 km/h (53 mph; 46 kn) with flaps, 90 km/h (56 mph; 49 kn) no flaps
- Cruise speed: 290 km/h (180 mph, 160 kn)
- Range: 715 km (444 mi, 386 nmi)
- Service ceiling: 7,000 m (23,000 ft)
- Time to altitude: 1,000 m (3,300 ft) in 2.7 minutes, 3,000 m (9,800 ft) in 7.5 minutes
- Take-off run: 150 m (490 ft)
- Landing run: 190 m (620 ft)

Armament

- 1x fixed forward firing synchronised 7.62mm ShKAS machine gun
