= Yokosuka Tenga =

Japanese experimental jet bomber

The Yokosuka Tenga (天河, Milky Way), was a proposal to provide the Imperial Japanese Navy with a jet-powered bomber towards the end of World War II. The concept was to replace the piston engines of the Yokosuka P1Y Ginga with turbojets.

The powerplant selected was the 8.34 kN (1,870 lbf) thrust Ishikawajima Ne-30 then under development. However, before a single example could be built, both the Ne-30 project and the Tenga were cancelled due to technical difficulties with the turbojet design.

== See also ==
- Yokosuka P1Y Ginga
- Arado Ar 234
