= Yokosuka K1Y =

Japanese trainer aircraft

K1Y
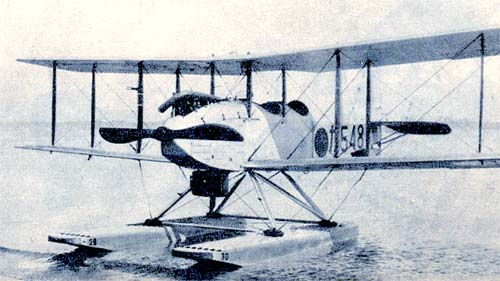

General information
- Type: Trainer
- National origin: Japan
- Manufacturer: Yokosuka Naval Air Technical Arsenal
- Primary user: Imperial Japanese Navy
- Number built: ~104

History
- Introduction date: 1925
- First flight: 1925

The Yokosuka K1Y, also known as the Navy Type 13 Trainer, was a Japanese single-engined biplane trainer of the 1920s. Designed by the Japanese Navy Arsenal at Yokosuka, over 100 were built by several manufacturers and was used by the Imperial Japanese Navy well into the 1930s.

== Design and development ==
In 1924, the Yokosuka Naval Air Technical Arsenal was tasked with designing a replacement for the Imperial Japanese Navy's Yokosuka I-go Ko-gata and Avro 504 floatplane trainers. The resultant design was a single-engined two-bay biplane of fabric-covered wooden construction. It was powered by a Gasuden-built 130 horsepower (97 kW) Benz six-cylinder water cooled inline engine and could be fitted with either a conventional landing gear or floats. It first flew in 1925 and was accepted into service as the Navy Type 13 Trainer, (Note: The type number was the year of the Taishō Emperor's reign of the requirement, i.e. Type 13 = 1924) with the short system designation E1Y.

== Operational history ==
After acceptance in October 1925, about forty were built by Nakajima, with forty-eight more built by Kawanishi from 1928-32, and ten by Watanabe in 1933–34, which, together with six aircraft built by Yokosuka, gave a total of about 104. The type remained the standard floatplane trainer of the Imperial Japanese Navy until it was replaced by the Yokosuka K4Y from 1933, although a few remained in use until the early years of the Second World War.

== Variants ==
K1Y1
Version with conventional wheeled undercarriage. Full designation Navy Type 13 Land Based Trainer.
K1Y2
Version with float undercarriage. Full designation Navy Type 13 Seaplane Trainer.

== Operators ==
Japan
Imperial Japanese Navy

== Specifications (K1Y2 seaplane) ==

Data from Japanese Aircraft 1910-1941

General characteristics

- Crew: 2
- Length: 8.68 m (28 ft 6 in)
- Wingspan: 10.205 m (33 ft 6 in)
- Height: 3.47 m (11 ft 5 in)
- Wing area: 32.65 m^{2} (351.4 sq ft)
- Empty weight: 872 kg (1,922 lb)
- Gross weight: 1,056 kg (2,328 lb)
- Powerplant: 1 × Gasuden Benz six-cylinder air-cooled inline engine, 97 kW (130 hp)

Performance

- Maximum speed: 130 km/h (81 mph, 70 kn)
- Endurance: 3 hr
- Time to altitude: 42 min to 2,000 m (6,600 ft)
