= Yakovlev AIR-11 =

AIR-11

General information
- Type: 3-seat touring cabin monoplane
- National origin: USSR
- Manufacturer: OKB Yakovlev
- Designer: A.S. Yakovlev
- Number built: 1

History
- First flight: late 1936

The Yakovlev AIR-11, also known as Yakovlev LT-1, was a 3-seat low-wing touring cabin monoplane designed by A.S. Yakovlev in the USSR, circa 1936.

== Design and development ==
Reportedly inspired by the Percival Gull, Yakovlev designed and built a similar aircraft using his tried and tested structural formulae of wooden wings, fabric covered steel tube fuselage with fabric covered D1 (Duralumin) tail section and control surfaces. The fixed tail-wheel undercarriage was spatted and fitted with trousers, with a spring steel tail-skid, or, alternatively, on skis.

Pilot and first passenger sat side by side under an upward-folding hood with the second passenger in a seat to the rear.

== Operational history ==
First flown in late 1936, the AIR-11 took part in sporting air races held on 24 July 1937 winning second place in the two-seat section.

After Sergei Ilyushin expressed his interest in the aircraft Yakovlev presented the aircraft to him, for commuting from Moscow to Voronezh. The aircraft crashed some time later, at the hands of Ilyushin, after a mechanic neglected to fill the oil tank, causing the engine to fail in flight.

== Specifications ==
Data from OKB Yakovlev, Yakovlev aircraft since 1924

General characteristics

- Crew: 1
- Capacity: 2 passengers
- Length: 7.32 m (24 ft 0 in)
- Wingspan: 10.2 m (33 ft 6 in)
- Wing area: 16.8 m^{2} (181 sq ft)
- Empty weight: 566 kg (1,248 lb)
- Gross weight: 891 kg (1,964 lb)
- Fuel capacity: 80 kg (180 lb) fuel; 14 kg (31 lb) oil
- Powerplant: 1 × de Havilland Gipsy Major 4-cylinder inverted air-cooled in-line piston engine, 89 kW (120 hp)
- Propellers: 2-bladed wooden fixed pitch propeller

Performance

- Maximum speed: 209 km/h (130 mph, 113 kn) *Landing speed: 82 km/h (51 mph; 44 kn)
- Cruise speed: 195 km/h (121 mph, 105 kn)
- Range: 720 km (450 mi, 390 nmi)
- Service ceiling: 4,480 m (14,700 ft)
- Time to altitude: 1,000 m (3,300 ft) in 5.2 minutes, 3,000 m (9,800 ft) in 21.6 minutes
- Take-off distance: 200 m (660 ft)
- Landing distance: 340 m (1,120 ft)
