= Yetti Air J-03 =

Czech ulatralight aircraft

J-03

General information
- Type: Amateur-built aircraft
- National origin: Czech Republic
- Manufacturer: Yetti Air
- Number built: 18

History
- Introduction date: 1994

The Yetti Air J-03 (or Yetti J-03) is a Czech ultralight aircraft designed and produced by Yetti Air in the Czech Republic.

== Design and development ==
The aircraft has a high-wing with a metal frame and fabric covering with two-seats-in-side-by-side configuration enclosed cockpit and a fixed conventional tail-wheel landing gear. Originally with a single 68 hp (51 kW) Škoda Favorit 63B engine but options for other Škoda, Rotax and Subaru car engines were available.

== Specifications ==
Data from

General characteristics

- Crew: one
- Capacity: one passenger
- Powerplant: 1 × Skoda Favorit 63B , 51 kW (68 hp)
- Propellers: 2-bladed
