= Yokosuka H7Y =

Japanese flying boat

H7Y

General information
- Type: Flying boat
- Manufacturer: Yokosuka
- Primary user: Imperial Japanese Navy Air Service (IJNAS)
- Number built: 1

History
- First flight: 1939

The Yokosuka H7Y (Allied reporting name: Tillie) (long designation: Yokosuka Experimental Kusho 12-shi Flying-boat) was a prototype Japanese flying boat of the Imperial Japanese Navy during the Second World War.

== Development ==
In 1937, the Imperial Navy of Japan formulated the technical task of the 12-Ci for the construction of a forward three- or four-engined flying boat. The maximum flight range was 9250 km with a bomb load of 1600 kg. Such a large range of flight was due to the desire of the fleet to carry out torpedo-bombing strikes on the ships of the US Navy in Pearl Harbor without intermediate refueling at sea. The development of the aircraft was assigned to the design team of the 1st Fleet Arsenal in Yokosuka, headed by Jun Okamura.

The project was carefully classified, no one except the developers knew about it. However, it is known that the H7Y was four-engined, with Junkers Jumo 205C radial engines, which were purchased in Germany. In addition, Japanese designers studied the development of the German aircraft Dornier Do 26.

The first and only prototype was built in 1939. It was a flying boat with a high-placed wing and four engines. The designers attached great importance to the aerodynamic characteristics of the aircraft, so the fuselage, wing and engine bonnet had a minimum number of protruding parts. To increase the range, it was necessary to sacrifice defensive armament. The H7Y was intended to conduct reconnaissance missions over Hawaii from Micronesia.

In the course of flight tests, the H7Y, which was as light as possible, showed unsatisfactory results. The fuselage was not tight enough. During the take-off, the wings were prone to dangerous oscillations. Due to the lack of engine power, taking off from the water was difficult. Attempts by the designers to reinforce the structure of the airframe led to an increase in mass, which made it impossible to reach the Hawaiian Islands without refueling. And with refueling at sea from submarines, a strike at Pearl Harbor could instead be carried out by the flying boat Kawanishi H8K, which could carry a significant bomb load and was well protected. Thus, in 1940, the Yokosuka H7Y program was cancelled.

Although the Yokosuka H7Y project was extremely secretive, TAI (Technical Air Intelligence unit) gave it the codename "Tillie".

== Specifications ==
Data from Japanese Aircraft 1910–1941

General characteristics

- Crew: 4
- Max takeoff weight: 18,000 kg (39,683 lb)
- Powerplant: 4 × Junkers Jumo 205C (Note: Only two engines of this type were acquired by the Navy.) 6-cylinder water-cooled opposed piston diesel engines, 380 kW (510 hp) each at 2,100 rpm

Performance

- Range: 9,254 km (5,750 mi, 4,997 nmi) minimum

Armament

- Guns: 2 or 3× 7.7 mm (0.303 in) machine guns
- Bombs: 1,600 kg (3,500 lb) of bombs or 2x torpedoes
