= Yokosuka MXY1 =

1930s Japanese experimental aircraft

MXY1

General information
- Type: Experimental aircraft
- National origin: Japan
- Manufacturer: Yokosuka Naval Air Technical Arsenal
- Number built: 1

History
- First flight: 1939

The Yokosuka MXY1 was an experimental aircraft built by the Watanabe Iron Works to a design from the Yokosuka Navy Technical Arsenal from 1937.

== Development ==
At the end of 1935, the Air Service Command of the Imperial Japanese Navy commissioned the Yokosuka Navy Technical Arsenal to carry out aerodynamic research with a parasol monoplane similar to the Parnall Parasol, but not related. The aircraft was built by Watababe, starting in November 1937 and completed by September 1938.

Receiving the designation "MXY1" (M (Special Purpose), X (Experimental), Y (Yokosho)), it was a parasol monoplane with a large glazed cabin, accommodating the pilot and 3 or 4 flight test observers. The aircraft was powered by a 670–730 hp (500–540 kW) Nakajima Hikari 1 kai engine with a long-chord NACA cowling. Rectangular wings were supported by large struts and the wheels of the strutted undercarriage were enclosed in large spats.

The tests showed poor performance of the aircraft, as well as a serious problem with vibration of the aircraft. Several months of work were spent on fixing deficiencies, but in the end the aircraft was abandoned, with parts being used in other research.

In parallel, work was conducted on almost identical MXY2, but due to the closure of the project, development was axed.

== Specifications ==
Data from Japońskie samoloty marynarki 1912-1945

General characteristics

- Crew: 1
- Capacity: 4 flight test observers in the cabin
- Length: 9.5 m (31 ft 2 in)
- Wingspan: 13 m (42 ft 8 in)
- Wing area: 28 m^{2} (300 sq ft)
- Empty weight: 1,000 kg (2,205 lb)
- Gross weight: 1,500 kg (3,307 lb)
- Powerplant: 1 × Nakajima Hikari 1 kai 9-cylinder air-cooled radoial piston engine, 500 kW (670 hp) to 730 hp (540 kW)
- Propellers: 2-bladed ground adjustable variable pitch metal propeller

Performance

- Maximum speed: 200 km/h (120 mph, 110 kn)
- Service ceiling: 8,000 m (26,000 ft)
