= Nakajima E2N =

Japanese reconnaissance seaplane

E2N
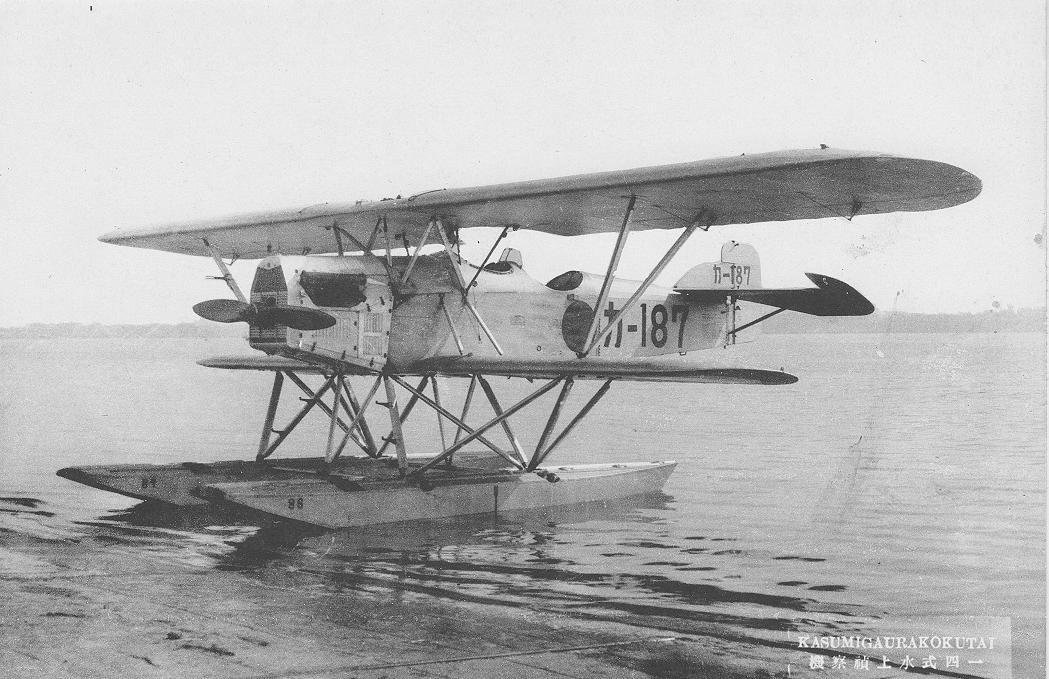

General information
- Type: Reconnaissance seaplane
- Manufacturer: Nakajima Aircraft Company
- Primary user: Imperial Japanese Navy
- Number built: 80

History
- Manufactured: 1927-1929
- Introduction date: 1927

The Nakajima E2N (Type 15) was a Japanese reconnaissance aircraft of the inter-war years. It was a single-engine, two-seat, sesquiplane seaplane with twin main floats.

== Design and development ==
The E2N was developed in the 1920s for the Imperial Japanese Navy as a short range reconnaissance floatplane suitable for catapult launch from cruisers and battleships. It was a wooden, twin-float sesquiplane, carrying a crew of two in open cockpits with folding wings and powered by a Mitsubishi "Hi" liquid-cooled engine. This layout gave better downwards view than the Hansa-Brandenburg inspired monoplanes proposed by Aichi and Yokosuka Naval Air Technical Arsenal, and the design was selected to become Japan's first locally designed shipboard reconnaissance seaplane in 1927. The E2N2 was a training version produced from 1928-1929 that featured dual controls.

== Operational history ==
The E2N served with the Navy as the Nakajima Navy Type 15 Reconnaissance Floatplane (一五式水上偵察機). Eighty examples were produced between 1927-29 by Nakajima and Kawanishi; of these, two were bought for civil fishery patrol duties. The Navy machines were withdrawn from front-line units in the early 1930s, with the E2N1 being replaced by the Nakajima E4N, and either being reassigned to training duties or sold to civil buyers. The E2N2 trainer stayed in use a bit longer than the E2N1, where they served with the Kasamigaura Kōkūtai until 1936.

== Variants ==
E2N1 (Type 15-1 Reconnaissance Seaplane)
Short-range reconnaissance aircraft.
E2N2 (Type 15-2 Reconnaissance Seaplane)
Trainer version with dual controls.

== Operators ==
Japan

- Imperial Japanese Navy

== Specifications (E2N) ==
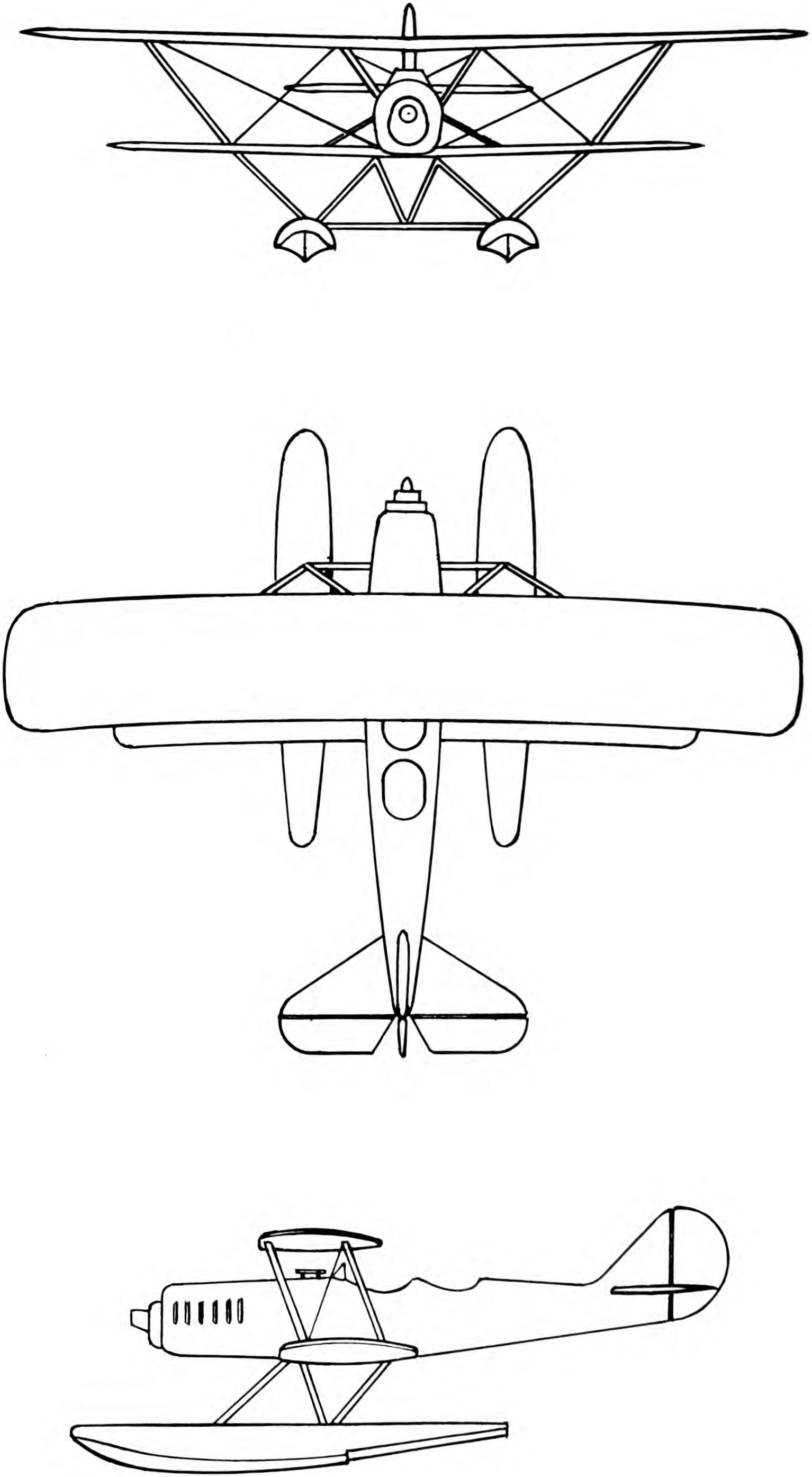
3-view drawing of the Nakajima E2N

Data from Japanese Aircraft, 1910-1941

General characteristics

- Crew: 2
- Length: 9.565 m (31 ft 5 in)
- Wingspan: 13.52 m (44 ft 4 in)
- Height: 3.688 m (12 ft 1 in)
- Wing area: 44 m^{2} (470 sq ft)
- Empty weight: 1,409 kg (3,106 lb)
- Gross weight: 1,950 kg (4,299 lb)
- Powerplant: × Mitsubishi Type Hi V-8 water-cooled piston engine, 220–250 kW (300–340 hp)
- Propellers: 2-bladed fixed-pitch wooden propeller

Performance

- Maximum speed: 172 km/h (107 mph, 93 kn)
- Endurance: 5 hours
- Time to altitude: 3,000 m (9,800 ft) in 31 minutes 37 seconds
- Wing loading: 44.3 kg/m^{2} (9.1 lb/sq ft)
- Power/mass: 0.12 kW/kg (0.07 hp/lb)

Armament

- Guns: 1 × flexible 7.7 mm (.303 in) machine gun

== See also ==
Related development

- Nakajima E4N

=== Bibliography ===
Mikesh, Robert C.; Abe, Shorzoe (1990). Japanese Aircraft, 1910-1941. London: Putnam & Company Ltd. ISBN 0-85177-840-2.
