= Yakovlev AIR-16 =

AIR-16

General information
- Type: Touring cabin monoplane
- National origin: USSR
- Designer: Vladimir Kotov & Yevgeniy Adler
- Number built: 1

History
- First flight: not flown

The Yakovlev AIR-16, also known as Yakovlev LT-2 or Yakovlev No.16 was a 4-seat cabin monoplane touring aircraft, designed and built in the USSR during 1937. Intended to be powered by a 220 hp (160 kW) Renault Bengali 6 engine, the AIR-16 was never flown. Sources differ but in his memoirs, Yevgeniy Adler, Kotovs successor, put the failure to fly down to inherent design weaknesses that were not able to be rectified.
