= Yokosuka MXY5 =

Japanese transport glider

MXY5
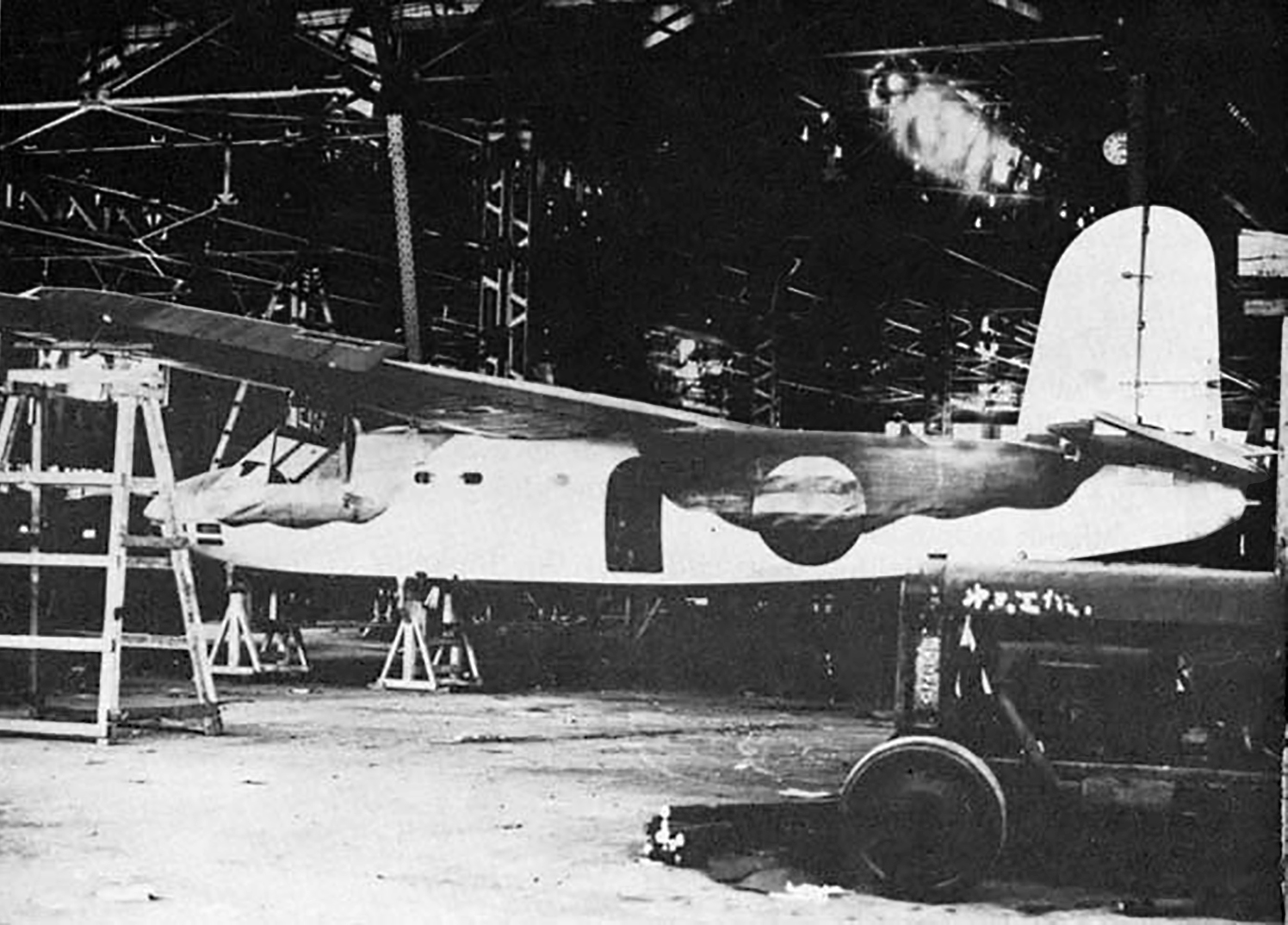

General information
- Type: Transport glider
- National origin: Japan
- Manufacturer: Yokosuka Naval Air Technical Arsenal
- Number built: 12

The Yokosuka MXY5 was a Japanese military glider produced for the Imperial Japanese Navy during World War II. The glider consisted of fabric-wrapped plywood covering a tubular steel frame. The design also featured a retractable undercarriage as well as an emergency skid. The design was flight tested in 1942. Only 12 were produced and none were used operationally.

== Variants ==
MXY5
original version; nine built
MXY5a
later version; three built

== Specifications (MXY5 and MXY5a) ==
Data from Oblicza Historii, Fighting gliders of World War II

General characteristics

- Crew: 2
- Capacity: 11 troops; 1,020 kg (2,240 lb) cargo
- Length: 13 m (43 ft)
- Wingspan: 18.1 m (59.4 ft)
- Wing area: 55.2 m^{2} (594 sq ft)
- Empty weight: 1,520 kg (3,350 lb)
- Gross weight: 2,694 kg (5,940 lb)
