= Yokosuka E1Y =

Japanese reconnaissance floatplane

E1Y
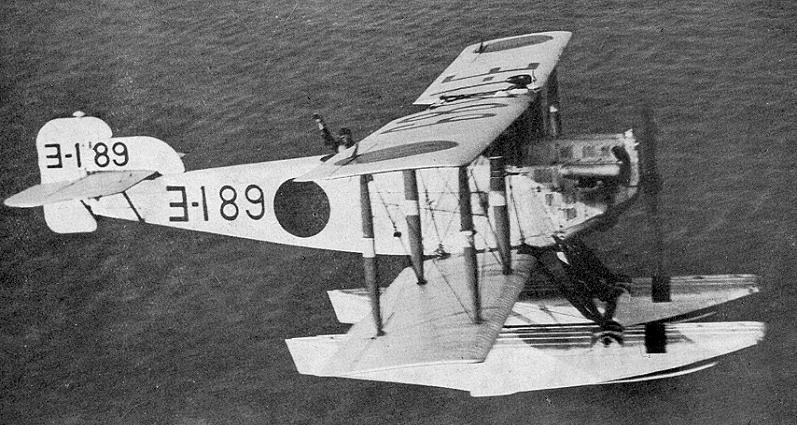

General information
- Type: Reconnaissance floatplane
- National origin: Japan
- Manufacturer: Yokosuka
- Primary user: Imperial Japanese Navy
- Number built: 320

History
- Introduction date: 1926
- First flight: 1923

The Yokosuka E1Y was a Japanese floatplane of the 1920s. A single-engined biplane that was designed and developed by the Yokosuka Naval Air Technical Arsenal as a reconnaissance aircraft for the Imperial Japanese Navy, 320 were built as the Type 14 Reconnaissance Seaplane, entering service in 1925 and remaining in operational service until 1932.

== Development and design ==
In 1921, the Japanese Naval Arsenal at Yokosuka started design of a single-engined reconnaissance floatplane to replace the Navy's Yokosuka Ro-go Ko-gata floatplanes. The resulting aircraft, the Type 10 Reconnaissance Seaplane^{[a]}, was designed by a team led by a member of a visiting delegation from Short Brothers of the United Kingdom. It was a single-engined, two-bay, two-seat biplane powered by a 400 hp (298 kW) Lorraine-Dietrich engine. Two were completed in 1923 but showed poor performance due to being overweight. A modified aircraft, the Type 10 Model A flew in 1924, showing only slight improvement, while a further revised prototype, the Model B, flew in 1925 - this curing the aircraft's weight problems while demonstrating better stability and control. As a result, several pre-production Type Bs were built.

Although the Type 10 was not adopted by the Japanese Navy, it was again redesigned, reducing the wingspan from 16.16 m (53 ft 0¼ in) to 13.99 m (45 ft 11 in) and reducing the empty weight from 1,912 kg (4,215 lb) to 1,660 kg (3,659 lb). In this form, the revised design was accepted in January 1926 as the Type 14 Reconnaissance Seaplane, later receiving the short designation E1Y.

Two versions entered service in 1926, a two-seater powered by a 400 hp (300 kW) Lorraine-Dietrich 1 V-12 engine, the Type 14-1 or E1Y1, and a three-seater with all-metal floats and a more powerful Lorraine-Dietrich 2 W engine. In 1928, the Type 14-2 was used as the basis for the Type 90-3 Reconnaissance Seaplane, of which about twenty were built as the Yokosuka E5Y1 and Kawanishi E5K1.

As the Type 90-3 showed little improvement over the Type 14-2 from which it was developed, in 1931, Yokosuka developed the further refined Type 14-3 Reconnaissance aircraft with a new tail, a geared Lorraine-Dietrich 3 engine, and significantly improved performance.

A total of 218 E1Y1 and E1Y2s were built by Yokosuka (23), Nakajima Aircraft Company (47), and Aichi (148). 102 E1Y3s were built by Aichi.

== Operational history ==
The E1Y1 and E1Y2 entered service in 1926, replacing Yokosuka Ro-Go Ko-Gata and Hansa-Brandenburg W.33 seaplanes, with the E1Y3 following them into service from 1931. The E1Ys formed the main reconnaissance seaplane equipment of the fleet, operating from battleships and seaplane tenders. E1Ys were operated from the seaplane tender Notoro during the Shanghai Incident of early 1932. The E1Y remained in use until the early part of the Second Sino-Japanese War.

Many E1Ys were sold as civil aircraft from 1932, usually converted with a cabin for three or four passengers. Some were fitted with Napier Lion engines.

== Variants ==
Navy Type 10 Reconnaissance Seaplane
Prototype reconnaissance seaplane, powered by 400 hp (298 kW) Lorraine-Dietrich 1 V-12 engine but overweight. Two built.
Navy Type 10 Model A Reconnaissance Seaplane
Revised prototype, one built.
Navy Type 10 Model B Reconnaissance Seaplane
Further modified prototype and pre-production aircraft.
Navy Type 14-1 Reconnaissance Seaplane (E1Y1)
Initial production version, powered by 400 hp (298 kW) Lorraine-Dietrich 1.
Navy Type 14-2 Reconnaissance Seaplane (E1Y2)
Modified version, with new all metal floats and 450 hp (336 kW) Lorraine-Dietrich 2 W-engine.
Navy Experimental Type 14-2 Kai-1 Reconnaissance Seaplane
an experimental version of the Type 14-2
Navy Type 14-3 Reconnaissance Seaplane (E1Y3)
Further improved version with new tail and improved performance.
Navy Type 14 Modified Transport Seaplane
Civil conversion.

== Operators ==
Japan

- Imperial Japanese Navy
- Nippon Koku Yuso Kenkyusho

== Specifications (E1Y2) ==
Data from Japanese Aircraft, 1910-1941

General characteristics

- Crew: 3
- Length: 10.59 m (34 ft 9 in)
- Wingspan: 14.22 m (46 ft 8 in)
- Height: 4.15 m (13 ft 7 in)
- Wing area: 54.2 m^{2} (583 sq ft)
- Empty weight: 1,889 kg (4,165 lb)
- Gross weight: 2,750 kg (6,063 lb)
- Powerplant: 1 × Lorraine 2 W-12 water-cooled piston engine, 336 kW (451 hp)

Performance

- Maximum speed: 178 km/h (111 mph, 96 kn)
- Cruise speed: 130 km/h (81 mph, 70 kn)
- Range: 1,156 km (718 mi, 624 nmi)
- Endurance: 9 hours
- Service ceiling: 4,000 m (13,000 ft)
- Time to altitude: 3,000 m (9,800 ft) in 28 minutes 13 seconds
- Wing loading: 50.7 kg/m^{2} (10.4 lb/sq ft)
- Power/mass: 0.1226 kW/kg (0.0746 hp/lb)

Armament

- Guns: 1× flexibly mounted 7.7 mm machine gun
- Bombs: 2× 110 kg (240 lb) or 4× 30 kg (66 lb) bombs

== See also ==
Related development

- Yokosuka E5Y1

Aircraft of comparable role, configuration, and era

- Nakajima E2N

== Footnotes ==
- ^{a} The type number was the year of the Taishō Emperor's reign, i.e. Type 10 = 1921.

=== Bibliography ===
- Donald, David, ed. (1997). The Encyclopedia of World Aircraft. Leicester, UK: Blitz Editions. ISBN 1-85605-375-X.
- Mikesh, Robert; Abe, Shorzoe (1990). Japanese Aircraft, 1910-1941. London: Putnam & Company Ltd. ISBN 0-85177-840-2.
