= Yakovlev UT-1 =

Soviet Air Force trainer aircraft

UT-1
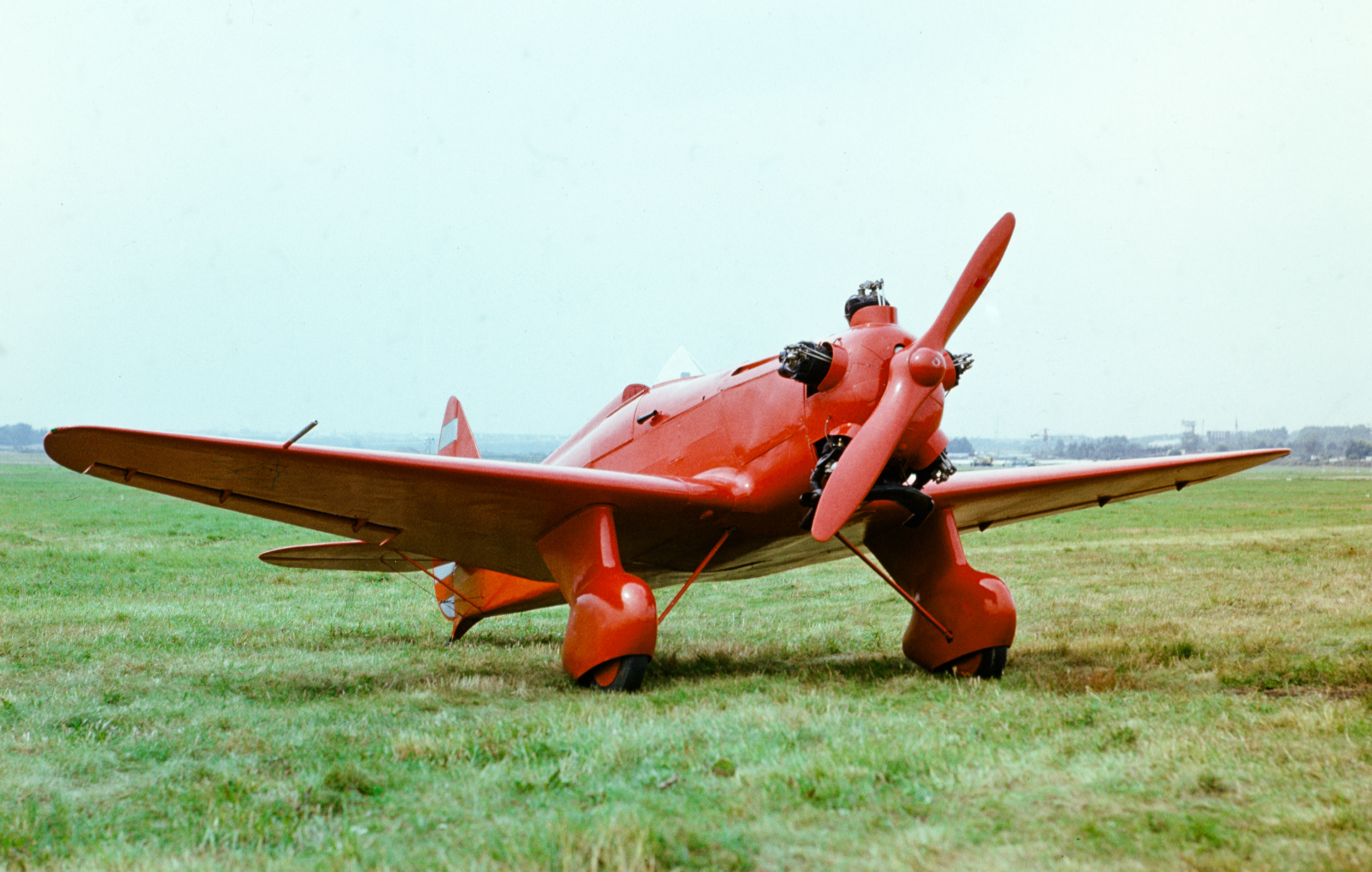
- Yakovlev UT-1

General information
- Type: Trainer/fighter trainer/aerobatic
- National origin: Soviet Union
- Manufacturer: Yakovlev
- Designer: Alexander Sergeyevich Yakovlev
- Number built: 1,241

History
- First flight: 1936

The Yakovlev UT-1 (Russian: Яковлев УТ-1) was a single-seater trainer aircraft used by the Soviet Air Force from 1937 until the late 1940s.

== Development ==
The Yakovlev UT-1 was designed as a single-seater advanced trainer and aerobatic airplane by the team led by Alexander Sergeyevich Yakovlev. The first prototype, designated the AIR-14, was flown in early 1936. The AIR-14 was a small low-winged monoplane with a fixed tailwheel undercarriage, with a welded steel fuselage and wooden wings.

After some changes, the AIR-14 was accepted for production. Among other improvements, the 75 kW (100 hp) Shvetsov M-11 radial was changed to the more powerful 86 kW (115 hp) M-11G. The plane received the designation UT-1 (uchebno-trenirovochnyi {учебно-тренировочный}, primary/advanced trainer); despite this designation, it was not suitable for primary training.

The UT-1 was used as a transitional type between the UT-2 and fighters like the I-16. It was not easy to fly, requiring precise piloting, thus forming an ideal intermediate between basic trainers and the maneuverable but difficult-to-fly I-16. In 1939 the plane was modified by moving the engine 26 cm (10 in) forward, which improved its handling. During production, the 112 kW (150 hp) M-11E engine was also used. Soviet pilots broke several records with the UT-1 before World War II, some with its floatplane variant. In total, 1,241 aircraft were built between December 1936 and 1940.

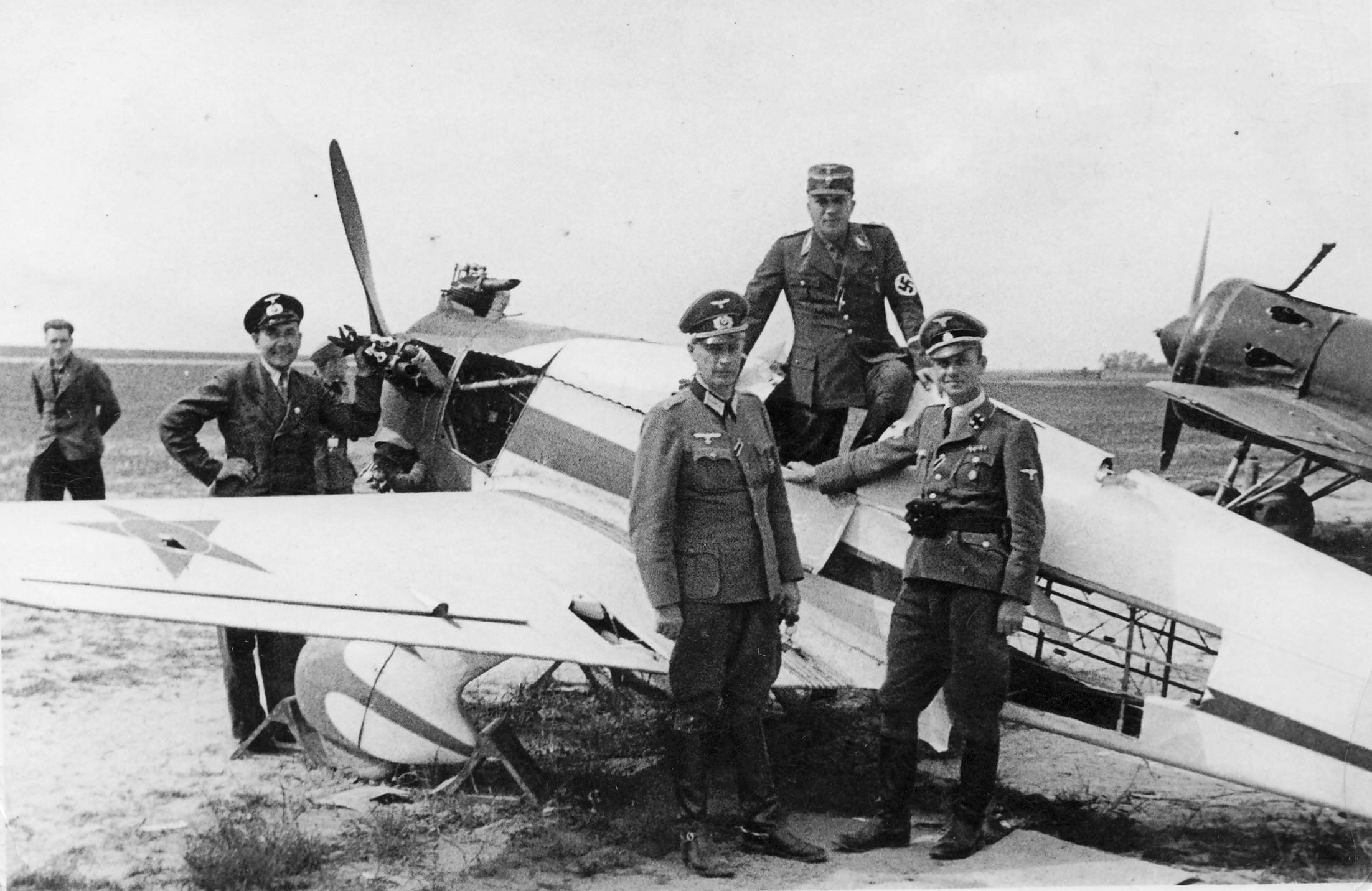
Germans inspecting UT-1

During World War II, from 1941, the UT-1 was also used for reconnaissance. Some were used as improvised combat machines, after fitting with underwing machine guns or even two unguided rockets. In February 1942, about 50 UT-1 were converted in workshops as improvised UT-1B (УТ-1б) ground-attack planes, fitted with two machine guns and two-four rockets. They were next used in Black Sea Fleet aviation in Sevastopol and Caucasus. The survivors were disarmed in December 1942.

== Variants ==
There were a large number of variants, the most numerous or noteworthy were:

- AIR-14 - Prototype of UT-1
- AIR-18 - UT-1 with a 104 kW (140 hp) Renault Bengali 4 inline engine and closed canopy, retractable undercarriage.
- AIR-21 (Ya-21, UT-21) - UT-1 with 164 kW (220 hp) Renault Bengali 6 engine, tested in 1938-39, fixed undercarriage.
- UT-1B - Wartime attack version with two ShKAS machine guns and two or four RS-82 rockets.
- UT-1E - (UT-1(15) For tests at TsAGI (sometimes confused with AIR-15, which was not a variant of UT-1).
- UT-1 Floatplane - with M-11Ye engine which later became standard in the majority of UT-1's.

== Operators ==
Soviet Union

- Soviet Air Force
- Soviet Naval Aviation

China

- Chinese Nationalist Air Force

== Specifications (UT-1 with M-11Ye) ==
Data from Gordon 2005 and Gunston 1995

General characteristics

- Crew: one
- Length: 5.75 m (18 ft 10 in)
- Wingspan: 7.3 m (23 ft 11 in)
- Height: 2.34 m (7 ft 8 in)
- Wing area: 9.58 m^{2} (103 sq ft)
- Empty weight: 429 kg (946 lb)
- Gross weight: 597.5 kg (1,317.5 lb)
- Powerplant: 1 × Shvetsov M-11Ye , 111 kW (150 hp)

Performance

- Maximum speed: 257 km/h (160 mph, 140 kn)
- Range: 670 km (419 mi, 364 nmi)
- Service ceiling: 7,120 m (23,360 ft)
- Rate of climb: 7.4 m/s (1,457 ft/min)

Armament

- Guns: 2 x 7.62mm ShKAS machine guns (Attack version)
- Rockets: 2 or 4 x RS-82 (Raketniy Snaryad - rocket shell) (Attack Version)

== See also ==
Related development

- Yakovlev UT-2

Related lists

- List of interwar military aircraft
