= Yokosuka K4Y =

Japanese floatplane trainer

K4Y
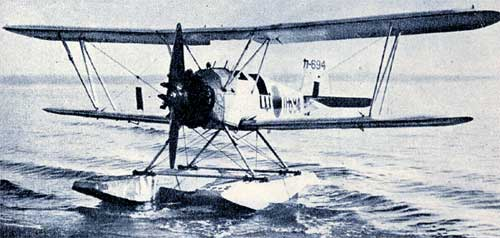

General information
- Type: Floatplane trainer
- National origin: Japan
- Manufacturer: Yokosuka Naval Air Technical Arsenal
- Primary user: Imperial Japanese Navy Air Service
- Number built: 211

History
- Introduction date: 1933
- First flight: 1930

The Yokosuka K4Y (or Navy Type 90 Seaplane Trainer) was a Japanese floatplane trainer of the 1930s. A single engined two-seat biplane, 211 K4Ys were built between 1933 and 1940, serving as the Imperial Japanese Navy's basic floatplane trainer throughout the Second World War.

== Development and design ==
In 1930, the Imperial Japanese Navy Air Service's basic seaplane trainer was the Yokosuka K1Y or Type 13 Seaplane Trainer, which had been in use from 1925, and it instructed the First Naval Air Technical Arsenal based at Yokosuka to design a replacement. The design team, led by Jiro Saha and Tamefumi Suzuki designed a single-bay biplane with a welded steel-tube fuselage and wooden wings, it being the first Japanese designed aircraft with such a fuselage.

Yokosuka built two prototypes, powered by 90 hp (67 kW) Hatakaze four-cylinder air-cooled inline engines in 1930, flying in 1930, and after successful testing, a version powered by a 130 hp Gasuden Jimpu radial engine was ordered into production as the Navy Type 90 Seaplane trainer, with the short designation K4Y1.

== Operational history ==
Production began at Watanabe in May 1933, Watanabe building 156 by 1939, with production then transferring to Nippon Hikoki who built a further 53 in 1939–40.

The K4Y1 started to replace the K1Y from 1933, remaining the Imperial Japanese Navy Air Service's principal basic seaplane trainer throughout the Pacific war. A few aircraft were released for civilian use.

== Units using this aircraft ==
Japan

- Imperial Japanese Navy Air Service

== Specifications (K4Y1 seaplane) ==
Data from Japanese Aircraft, 1910-1941

General characteristics

- Crew: 2
- Length: 9.05 m (29 ft 8 in)
- Wingspan: 10.90 m (35 ft 9 in)
- Height: 3.51 m (11 ft 6 in)
- Wing area: 29.5 m^{2} (318 sq ft)
- Empty weight: 740 kg (1,631 lb)
- Gross weight: 990 kg (2,183 lb)
- Powerplant: 1 × Gasuden Jimpu 2 seven-cylinder air-cooled radial engine, 97 kW (130 hp)

Performance

- Maximum speed: 163 km/h (101 mph, 88 kn) at sea level
- Cruise speed: 93 km/h (58 mph, 50 kn)
- Range: 310 km (200 mi, 170 nmi)
- Endurance: 3 hours 30 min
- Service ceiling: 3,460 m (11,350 ft)
- Time to altitude: 29 min 20 sec to 3,000 m (9,800 ft)
