= Yokosuka D3Y Myōjō =

Japanese dive bomber and training aircraft

D3Y Myōjō

General information
- Type: Trainer; Dive bomber
- Manufacturer: Yokosuka
- Status: Cancelled
- Primary user: IJN Navy Air Service (Intended)
- Number built: 2 Prototypes; 3 Production

History
- Manufactured: 1945
- First flight: 1945
- Developed from: Aichi D3A

The Yokosuka D3Y Myōjō (明星, "Venus") was a twin-seat dive bomber and trainer aircraft designed by the Yokosuka Naval Air Technical Arsenal and produced by the Japanese aviation manufacturer Matsushita Koku Kogyo K.K.

Derived from the Aichi D3A dive bomber, work began on the D3Y during late 1943 amid the Pacific War under the initial designation of Y-50. In light of known material and labour constrains from the onset of development, the D3Y was composed nearly entirely of wood in order to conserve strategic resources and its design was simplified so that semi-skilled workers could participate in the construction effort. In the closing months of the conflict, the single-seat D3Y2 Special Attacker Myōjō Kai (Venus Modified) variant was also being designed specifically to conduct kamikaze attacks, although the respective prototype was never completed. Only three production standard aircraft, designated Navy Type 99 Bomber Trainer Myōjō Model 22, had been delivered prior to the Surrender of Japan, at which point further work on the project was terminated.

== Design and development ==
The origins of the Yokosuka D3Y Myōjō can be traced back to 1943. By this point of the Pacific War, the economy of Imperial Japan was already encountering constraints and deterioration, leading to shortages of both light alloys and skilled labourers; this in turn impacted military procurement decisions and rendered it impossible to fully satisfy the large orders for aircraft that were being placed by both the Imperial Japanese Army (IJA) and Imperial Japanese Navy (IJN). Accordingly, the IJN issued an instruction to its suppliers, informing them to examine potential measures for increasing the use of non-strategic materials in the construction of both trainer and transport aircraft.

In accordance with this instruction, work on a wooden derivative of the Aichi D3A, a successful IJN dive bomber, commenced at the Yokosuka Naval Air Technical Arsenal under the initial designation of Y-50. Initially, the design team planned for the aircraft to remain quite close to the original D3A design, however the desire for the production effort to be largely staffed by semi-skilled workers that lacked any experience of aircraft manufacturing necessitated considerable changes to be made. Specifically, the elliptical wing and rounded tail used on the D3A were too complex to be made entirely of wood, and thus were substituted for using straight tapered surfaces. The fuselage was also lengthened for greater stability. As per the IJN's instruction, the D3Y was primarily composed of wood.

The general configuration of the D3Y was of a low-winged monoplane with a fixed tailwheel undercarriage, akin to the preceding D3A. An enclosed cockpit was present for the crew, which could consist of either one or two pilots. Power was provided by a single Mitsubishi Kinsei 62 14-cylinder radial engine, rated to produce 1,560 hp, which drove a three-bladed metal propeller.

In summer 1944, a pair of prototypes were completed. However, these proved to be substantially heavier than had been anticipated, thus a redesign effort was promptly initiated to successfully reduce the aircraft's weight. Around this time, quantity production of the D3Y was assigned to the Matsushita Koku Kogyo K.K.. In 1945, design work also commenced on a single-seat model, the D3Y2 Special Attacker Myōjō Kai (Venus Modified), although the prototype was never completed. It was to have been fitted with a jettisonable undercarriage and armed with a pair of 20 mm Type 99 Mark 1 machine guns that were located within the engine cowling along with provisions for the carriage of up to 800 kg (1,800 lb) of bombs.

Despite schedules calling for 30 aircraft to be produced per month, Matsushita only ever completed three production standard D3Y1s in summer 1945 for the Imperial Japanese Navy Air Service (IJNAS), which designated the type as the Navy Type 99 Bomber Trainer Myōjō Model 22. No further deliveries took place due to the end of the Pacific War following the Surrender of Japan.

== Variants ==
D3Y1-K Myōjō (Navy Type 99 Bomber Trainer Myōjō Model 22)
A two seat wooden dive-bomber trainer. Powered by a 1,300 hp (970 kW) Mitsubishi Kinsei 54 radial engine, based on the Aichi D3A2-K, with significant changes to allow production in wood. Two prototypes and three production aircraft built.

D3Y2-K Myōjō
Single-seat special attack version (Kamikaze) of the D3Y1. The undercarriage would be jettisoned on take off since the aircraft was not expected to return. The prototype had begun construction but was still incomplete when the conflict ended.

D5Y1 Myōjō Kai (Navy Special Attacker Myōjō Kai)
Production designation given to the D3Y2-K.

== Operators ==
Japan

- Imperial Japanese Navy Air Service

== Specifications (D3Y2-K) ==
Data from Japanese Aircraft of the Pacific War

General characteristics

- Crew: 1
- Length: 11.515 m (37 ft 9 in)
- Wingspan: 14 m (45 ft 11 in)
- Height: 4.2 m (13 ft 9 in)
- Wing area: 30.5 m^{2} (328 sq ft)
- Empty weight: 3,050 kg (6,724 lb)
- Gross weight: 4,630 kg (10,207 lb)
- Powerplant: 1 × Mitsubishi Kinsei 62 14-cylinder two-row air-cooled radial piston engine, 1,160 kW (1,560 hp) for take-off

1,000 kW (1,340 hp) at 2,100 m (6,900 ft)
890 kW (1,190 hp) at 5,800 m (19,000 ft)

- Propellers: 3-bladed constant-speed metal propeller

Performance

- Maximum speed: 470 km/h (290 mph, 250 kn) at 5,000 m (16,000 ft)
- Cruise speed: 296 km/h (184 mph, 160 kn) at 3,000 m (9,800 ft)
- Range: 1,472 km (915 mi, 795 nmi)
- Time to altitude: 6,000 m (20,000 ft) in 11 minutes and 45 seconds
- Power/mass: 4.0 kg/kW (6.5 lb/hp)

Armament

- Guns: 2x 20 mm (0.787 in) Type 99 Mark 1 machine gun in the engine cowling.
- Bombs: 1x 800 kg (1,800 lb) bomb.

== See also ==
Related lists

- List of military aircraft of Japan
