= Kugisho B3Y =

Japanese torpedo bomber

Yokosuka B3Y
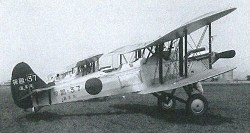

General information
- Type: Torpedo Bomber
- Manufacturer: Kaigun Koku-Gijutsu-Sho - Kugisho) -(Naval Air Technical Arsenal)
- Primary user: Imperial Japanese Navy Air Service
- Number built: 129

History
- Introduction date: 1933

The Kugisho B3Y, or Navy Type 92 Carrier Attack Bomber, also popularly titled Yokosuka B3Y, was a Japanese carrier-based torpedo bomber of the 1930s. It was designed by the Naval Air Technical Arsenal at Yokosuka, and while unimpressive during testing, it was ordered into service by the Imperial Japanese Navy and used until replaced by more capable aircraft.

== Development and design ==
In 1932, the Imperial Japanese Navy had a requirement, 7-Shi, for a new torpedo bomber to replace the Mitsubishi B2M. The air arsenal at Yokosuka prepared its own design to meet this requirement, competing against designs by Mitsubishi and Nakajima.

The resulting aircraft was a three-seat single-engine biplane, with a fuselage of steel tube construction and two-bay wooden wings that could fold rearwards for storage aboard aircraft carriers. It was powered by a single Hiro Type 91 W engine rated at 450 kW (600 hp).

Testing proved that the aircraft had poor stability and control, and that the engine was unreliable. The competing Mitsubishi and Nakajima aircraft were even less successful however, and after modifications made by Tokuichiro Gomei of Aichi Kokuki, the aircraft was accepted by the Navy in August 1933 as the Kugisho Navy Type 92 Carrier Attack Bomber, with a short designation of B3Y1, with production by Aichi, Watanabe and the Hiro Naval Arsenal, 129 being produced by the time that production finished in 1936.

== Operational history ==
The B3Y1 continued to be prone to engine problems, which frequently caused the type to be grounded. It served operationally in the early part of the Second Sino-Japanese War, gaining a good reputation for accurate level bombing against small targets. The Yokosuka B3Y was gradually phased out of operational service, being replaced by Aichi's D1A dive bomber and Yokosuka's B4Y torpedo bomber.

== Operators ==
Japan

- Imperial Japanese Navy Air Service

== Specifications (B3Y1) ==
Data from Japanese Aircraft, 1910–1941

General characteristics

- Crew: 3
- Length: 9.5 m (31 ft 2 in)
- Wingspan: 13.51 m (44 ft 4 in)
- Height: 3.73 m (12 ft 3 in)
- Wing area: 50 m^{2} (540 sq ft)
- Empty weight: 1,850 kg (4,079 lb)
- Gross weight: 3,200 kg (7,055 lb)
- Powerplant: 1 × Hiro Type 91 W-12 water-cooled piston engine, 450 kW (600 hp)
- Propellers: 2-bladed fixed-pitch propeller

Performance

- Maximum speed: 219 km/h (136 mph, 118 kn)
- Endurance: 4 hours 30 minutes
- Wing loading: 64 kg/m^{2} (13 lb/sq ft)
- Power/mass: 0.14 kW/kg (0.085 hp/lb)

Armament

- Guns: 1 × fixed, forward-firing 7.7 mm (0.303 in) machine gun and 1 × flexible, rearward-firing machine gun in observer's cockpit
- Bombs: 1 × 800 kg (1,800 lb) torpedo or 500 kg (1,100 lb) bombs

== See also ==
Aircraft of comparable role, configuration, and era

- Mitsubishi B2M
- Yokosuka B4Y
- Blackburn Shark
- Fairey Swordfish
- Martin BM
