= Yokosuka E5Y =

Japanese reconnaissance floatplane

General information
- Type: reconnaissance seaplane
- National origin: Japan
- Manufacturer: Yokosuka Naval Air Technical Arsenal
- Number built: 20

History
- Introduction date: 1930

The Yokosuka E5Y (long designation: Yokosuka Navy Type 90-3 Reconnaissance Seaplane) was a single-engine Japanese seaplane used for reconnaissance. The E5Y was also built by Kawanishi as the E5K (long designation: Kawanishi Navy Type 90-3 Reconnaissance Seaplane)

== Development ==
The Yokosuka Type 90-3 (E5Y1) was a second-generation seaplane with a 450 hp (340 kW) engine based on an updated Yokosuka E1Y, developed at the Yokosuka Naval Arsenal in Kanagawa Prefecture, featuring two externally mounted floats. The Japanese Navy initially designated it as the Yokosuka Navy Type 14-2 Kai-1 Reconnaissance Seaplane, but production was undertaken by Kawanishi as the Kawanishi Navy Type 90-3 Reconnaissance Seaplane. By 1932, the Aichi AB-6 was under development to replace the E5Y / E5K seaplanes.

=== Kawanishi E5K ===
The Kawanishi E5K1 or Kawanishi Type G was a large 1930s Japanese three-seat reconnaissance floatplane. The E5K1, a radial-engined twin-float seaplane, first flew in October 1931, but due to problems in development only 20 production aircraft were built. The type entered service with the Imperial Japanese Navy Air Service in April 1932 as the Kawanishi Navy Type 90-3 Reconnaissance Seaplane.

The E5K1 was a production version with a 450 hp (340 kW) Bristol Jupiter radial engine; 20 production aircraft were built.

Two pre-production Type-14-2 Kai-1-Ds, powered by the Bristol Jupiter were built by Kawanishi under the company name Kawanishi Type G. Seventeen production aircraft were built as the Kawanishi Navy Type 90-3 Reconnaissance Seaplane (E5K1).

== Operational history ==
On 25 May 1932, the IJN seaplane tender-oiler Notoro was re-equipped with Kawanishi Navy Type 90-3 Reconnaissance Seaplanes as well as other tenders and battleships of the IJN. The E5K saw action during the Shanghai Incident from 28 January – 3 March 1932. The Japanese seaplane tender Kamoi carried a complement of twelve E5Y aircraft.

== Variants ==
Yokosuka Navy Type 14-2 Reconnaissance Seaplane Kai-1
Prototype of the later Type-14-2 and Type 90-3 production aircraft, powered by a 450 hp (340 kW) Bristol Jupiter VIII radial engine.
Yokosuka Navy Type 14-2 Reconnaissance Seaplane Kai-1-C
Initial production aircraft powered by 450 hp (340 kW) Lorraine 12E Courlis W-12 water-cooled engines.
Yokosuka Navy Type 14-2 Reconnaissance Seaplane Kai-1-D
Later prototype aircraft with Jupiter engines in a lengthened nose.
Yokosuka Type 90-3 Reconnaissance Seaplane
Designation of production aircraft to have been built by the Yokosuka Naval Arsenal (Yokosho)
Kawanishi Type G
Company designation for two pre-production Navy Type 14-2 Reconnaissance Seaplane Kai-1-Ds.
Kawanishi Type 90-3 Reconnaissance Seaplane
Seventeen production aircraft, initially powered by Jupiter engines, with some later being re-engined with Hiro Type 91 520 hp water-cooled W-12 engines
Yokosuka E5Y1
Short designation of aircraft built at the Yokosuka Naval Arsenal, (a.k.a. Yokosho E5Y1)
Kawanishi E5K1

Short designation for the production aircraft built by Kawanishi

== Specifications (Type 90-3 / E5Y1 / E5K1) ==
Data from

General characteristics

- Crew: 3
- Length: 10.812 m (35 ft 6 in)
- Wingspan: 14.46 m (47 ft 5 in)
- Height: 4.74 m (15 ft 7 in) with wings folded
- Wing area: 55 m^{2} (590 sq ft)
- Empty weight: 1,850 kg (4,079 lb)
- Gross weight: 3,000 kg (6,614 lb)
- Powerplant: 1 × Bristol Jupiter VIII 9-cyl. Air-cooled radial piston engine, 340 kW (450 hp)
- Propellers: 2-bladed wooden fixed pitch propeller

Performance

- Maximum speed: 178 km/h (111 mph, 96 kn)
- Cruise speed: 130 km/h (81 mph, 70 kn)
- Endurance: 6.5 hours
- Service ceiling: 4,050 m (13,290 ft)
- Time to altitude: 3,000 m (9,800 ft) in 33 minutes 20 seconds
- Wing loading: 54.5 kg/m^{2} (11.2 lb/sq ft)
- Power/mass: 0.112 kW/kg (0.068 hp/lb)

Armament

- Guns: 2 x 7.77 mm (0.306 in) fixed Type 89 machine-guns and 2 x 7.77 mm (0.306 in) flexible Type 89 machine-guns
- Bombs: max250 kg (551.156 lb)
  - 2 x 125 kg (275.578 lb)
  - or 3 x 60 kg (132.277 lb)
  - or 3 x 30 kg (66.139 lb)

== See also ==
Related lists

- List of military aircraft of Japan
- List of flying boats and floatplanes
