= Yokosuka H5Y =

Japanese flying boat

H5Y
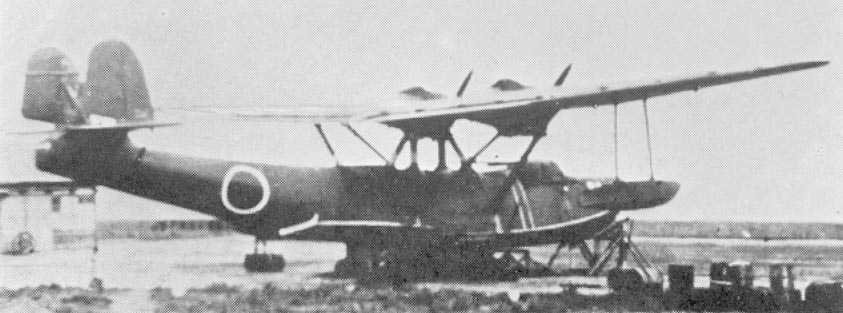
- Yokosuka H5Y Type 99 Flying Boat "Cherry"

General information
- Type: Flying boat
- Manufacturer: Yokosuka
- Primary user: Imperial Japanese Navy Air Service (IJNAS)
- Number built: 20

History
- Manufactured: 1938 - 1941
- Introduction date: 1939
- First flight: 1936

The Yokosuka H5Y (short designation) or Yokosuka Navy Type 99 Flying Boat Model 11 (九九式飛行艇, 99shiki hikōtei) (long designation), given the Allied code name Cherry, was an IJNAS flying boat in service from 1938.

== Design and development ==
The H5Y was designed by Yokosuka to meet an Imperial Japanese Naval Air Service's requirement for a twin-engine maritime reconnaissance flying boat, which was intended to match the performance of contemporary four-engine flying boats while being cheaper to build and easier to maintain. Two prototypes were built at the 11th Naval Arsenal, Hiro, being completed in 1936.

The H5Y was a twin-engine parasol wing aircraft, and thus resembled a scaled-down version of the Kawanishi H6K "Mavis". Performance was found to be poor however, with the aircraft underpowered and suffering from structural problems, which delayed production. Only twenty were built between 1936 and 1941. Yokosuka Naval Air Arsenal built the aircraft at the Dai-Juichi Kaigun Kokusho facility.

== Operational history ==
The H5Y was accepted for production in 1938 as the Type 99 Flying Boat Model 11, production deliveries starting in 1939. However, production was quickly cancelled owing to the poor performance, with only twenty being built. Although some were used for coastal anti-submarine patrols early in World War II, they were quickly transferred to second-line duties such as transport or training.

== Variants ==
H5Y
2 Prototypes constructed at the Hiro Naval Arsenal
H5Y1
Production model, 18 built.
Yokosuka Navy Type 99 Flying Boat Model 11
The long formal designation of the H5Y.

== Operators ==
Japan

- Imperial Japanese Navy Air Service

== Specifications (Yokosuka H5Y1) ==
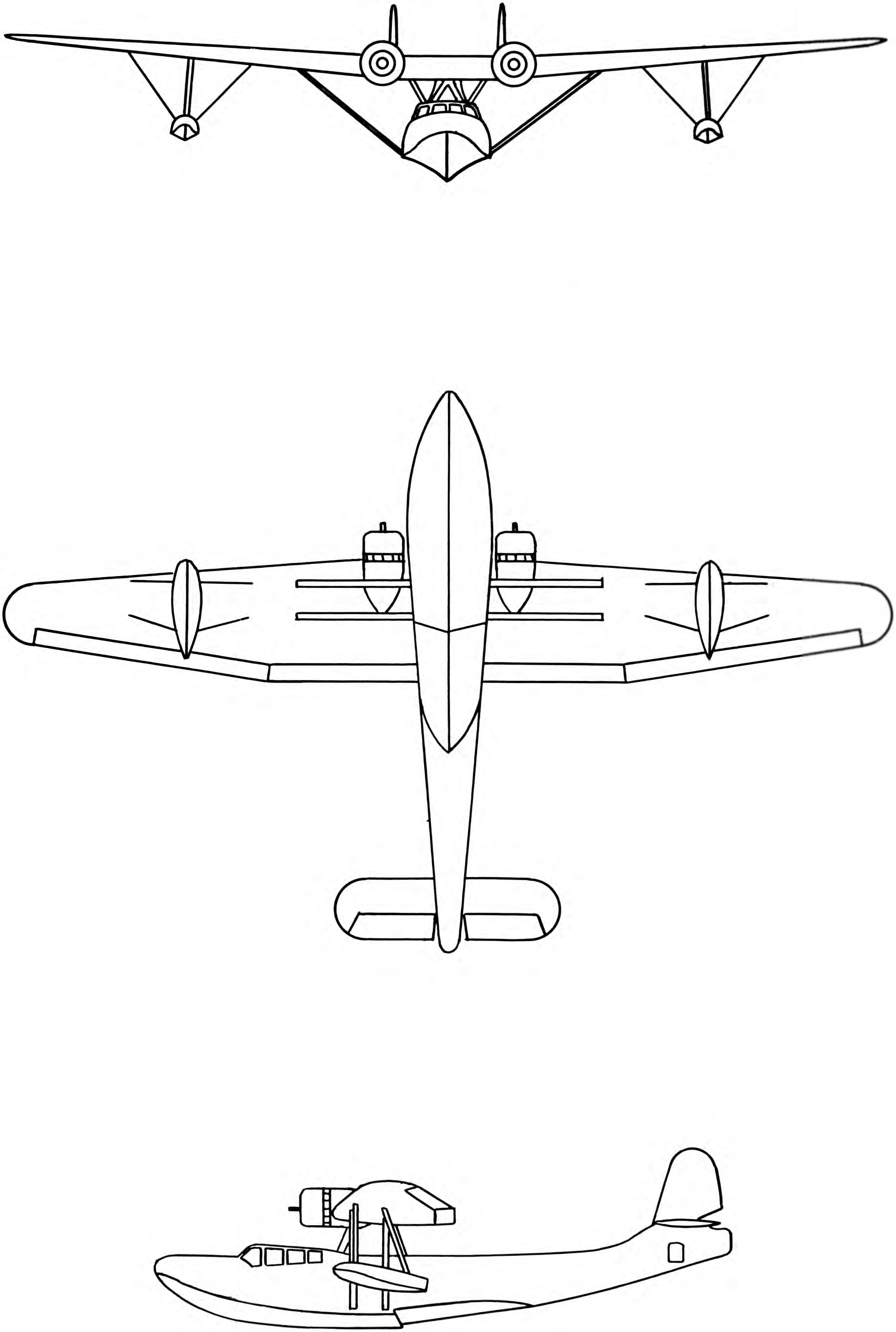
3-view drawing of the Yokosuka H5Y

Data from Warplanes of the Second World War, Volume Five: Flying Boats

General characteristics

- Crew: 6
- Length: 20.53 m (67 ft 4 in)
- Wingspan: 31.57 m (103 ft 7 in)
- Height: 6.71 m (22 ft 0 in)
- Wing area: 107.7 m^{2} (1,159 sq ft)
- Empty weight: 7,070 kg (15,587 lb)
- Gross weight: 11,500 kg (25,353 lb)
- Powerplant: 2 × Mitsubishi MK1A Shinten 21 14-cylinder air-cooled radial piston engines, 890 kW (1,200 hp) each
- Propellers: 3-bladed variable-pitch propellers

Performance

- Maximum speed: 306 km/h (190 mph, 165 kn) at 700 m (2,300 ft)
- Range: 4,800 km (3,000 mi, 2,600 nmi)
- Endurance: 26 hours
- Service ceiling: 5,200 m (17,100 ft)
- Time to altitude: 3,000 m (9,800 ft) in 24 minutes

Armament

- Guns: 3× 7.7 mm (.303 in) machine guns
- Bombs: 2× 250 kg (552 lb) bombs

== See also ==
Related lists

- List of aircraft of World War II
- List of flying boats
- List of military aircraft of Japan
