= Yokosuka B4Y =

Japanese carrier-borne torpedo bomber

B4Y1
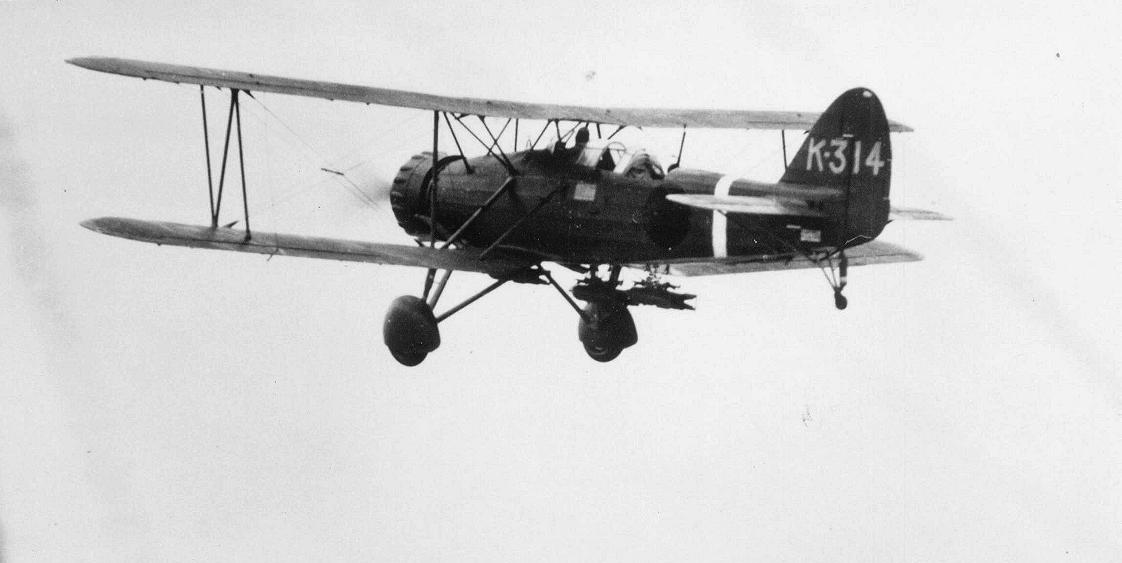

General information
- Type: Torpedo bomber
- Manufacturer: Yokosuka Naval Air Technical Arsenal
- Number built: 205

History
- Introduction date: 1936
- First flight: 1935
- Retired: 1943

The Yokosuka B4Y (Navy Type 96 Carrier Attack Bomber) was a carrier-borne biplane torpedo bomber designed and primarily produced by the Japanese defence manufacturer Yokosuka Naval Air Technical Arsenal. Flown by the Imperial Japanese Navy Air Service (IJNAS) during World War II, The Allied reporting name was "Jean". It was mistakenly identified by the British as the Nakajima Navy G-96.

Developed during the early-to-mid 1930s, the first prototype made its maiden flight in late 1935 and was ordered into production in March 1936. Reaching operational IJN units that same year, the B4Y quickly replaced both the Mitsubishi B2M2 and the Yokosuka B3Y. Furthermore, it was promptly deployed into live combat during the Second Sino-Japanese War, where the type was typically used as a land-based bomber. In one high-profile incident, three B4Ys attacked the United States Navy gunboat Panay outside of Nanjing, resulting in major internal tension over the incident.

In 1940, the arrival of the more capable Nakajima B5N effectively replaced the B4Y1 as a frontline carrier-based attack aircraft, leading to the type being relegated to the advanced trainer role, which it thus continued to fly from Hōshō and Unyō into the Pacific War. While sometimes recorded as having sunk several capital ships, such as the battleship HMS Prince of Wales and the battlecruiser HMS Repulse, this was due to misidentification by the Allies. Irrespective, the B4Y was present for several major engagements, including the Battle of Midway. It would be the final biplane bomber to see operational use with the IJN, the final examples being withdrawn during 1943.

== Design and development ==
The origins of the Yokosuka B4Y can be traced back to 1932 and the issuing of a requirement by the Imperial Japanese Navy (IJN) for a new carrier-borne attack aircraft. While Aichi, Mitsubishi and Nakajima each responded to this requirement and built a prototype, none of these aircraft were deemed to be satisfactory. Accordingly, in 1934, the IJN issued the 9-Shi requirement, which urgently called for a more capable aircraft to replace the obsolescent Yokosuka B3Y, which had proved to be thoroughly unreliable operationally. The Yokosuka Naval Air Technical Arsenal was amongst the organisations that opted to respond; its submission was designed primarily by Sanae Kawasaki.

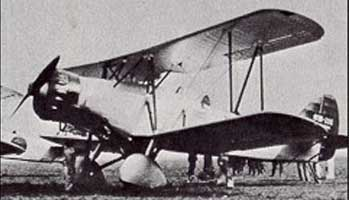

Kawasaki opted for an all-metal structure that was largely composed of light alloys while the skin could either be made of fabric or metal. It was designed to carry a single 800 kg torpedo or up to 500 kg of bombs; for self-defence, it was furnished with a single rear-facing flexibly-mounted 7.7 mm Type 92 machine gun. One key difference between the prototypes and subsequent production aircraft was the crew accommodation, which was distributed between two cockpits; while the pilot was seated in the open front cockpit, the other two crewmen, typically a navigator and radio operator/gunner, were seated together in the rear cockpit under a canopy.

Two key design objectives of Kawasaki was to produce an aircraft that was capable of fitting a range of different powerplants as well as to make use of existing components wherever practical. Accordingly, while the fuselage and tail unit were newly-designed elements, the highly efficient wing of the existing Kawanishi E7K was adopted wholesale. In terms of its general configuration, it was a biplane with fixed landing gear. An initial prototype was completed and flown in late 1935; it was joined by a further four prototypes during the following year, which were fitted with a range of engines.

During competitive flyoffs, the prototype equipped with the Nakajima Hikari 2 radial engine performed better than any rival aircraft; accordingly, the B4Y1 was ordered into production in November 1936, becoming the first IJN carrier attack aircraft to utilize an air-cooled engine. The B4Y was produced by multiple different manufacturers, the Yokosuka Naval Air Technical Arsenal being responsible for producing only the first five prototypes between 1935 and 1936. For quantity production, the work was transferred; the Nakajima Aircraft Company completed 37 production standard aircraft between 1937 and 1938, Mitsubishi Heavy Industries produced another 135 aircraft at its Nagoya facility between 1937 and 1938, and the 11th Naval Air Arsenal build 28 production aircraft in 1938; in total, 205 aircraft were produced.

== Operational service ==
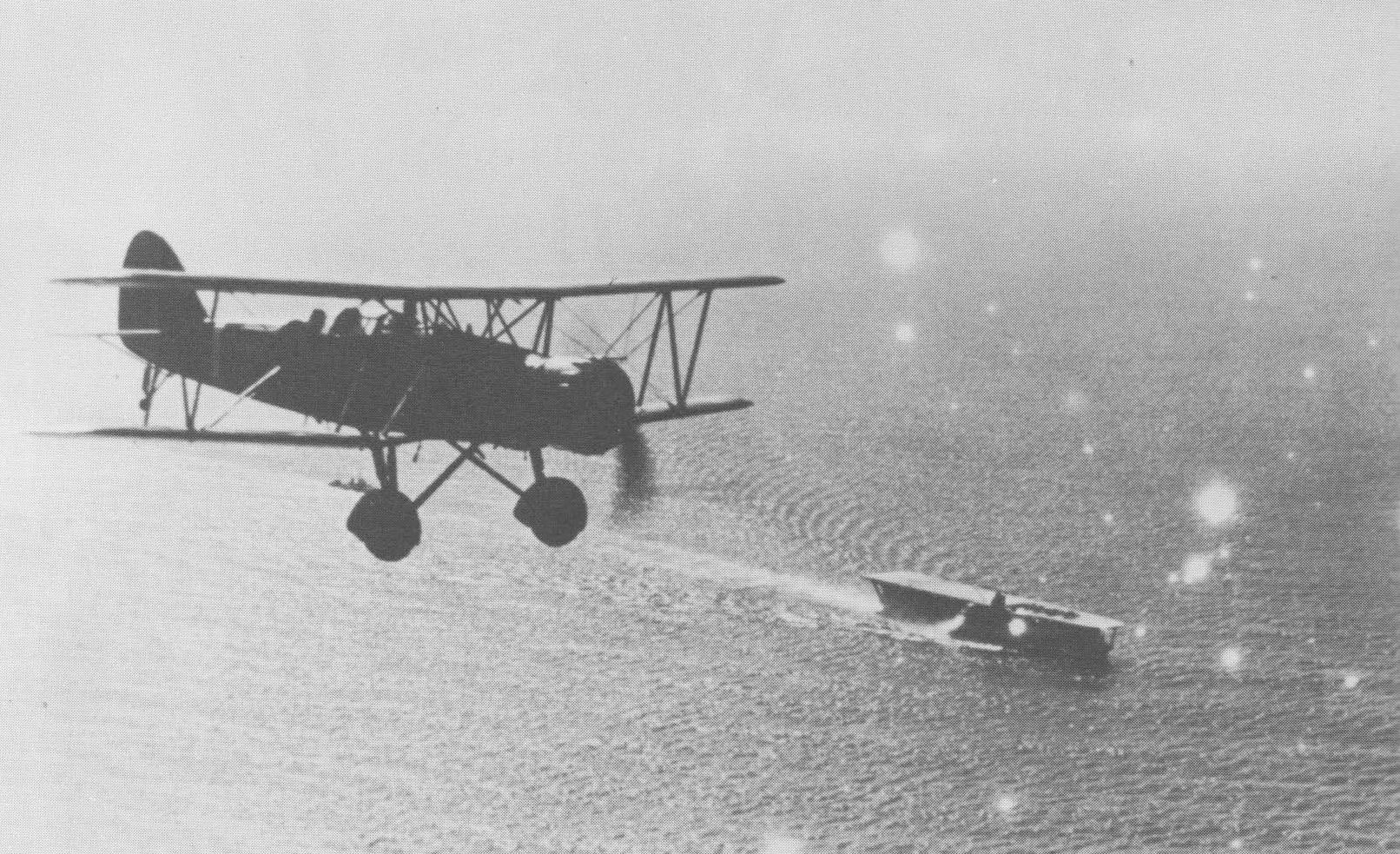
A Navy Type 96 Carrier Attack Bomber flies near the aircraft carrier Kaga off China in 1937 or 1938.

Although primarily operated as a carrier-based aircraft, the B4Y1 also saw frequently use as a land-based bomber. It was in the latter capacity that it made its combat debut during the Second Sino-Japanese War. On 12 December 1937, three B4Y1s were involved in the USS Panay incident, during which the United States Navy gunboat Panay came under attack from Japanese forces while she was anchored in the Yangtze River outside of Nanjing.

According to the aviation author René J. Francillon, at the start of the Pacific War, the Allies mistakenly believed that the B4Y was still the principal carrier-based torpedo bomber operated by the IJN, and thus erroneously attributed the sinking of several capital ships, such as the battleship HMS Prince of Wales and the battlecruiser HMS Repulse, to the type. In actuality, by the start of the conflict, it had largely been displaced by newer torpedo bombers; specifically, the more capable Nakajima B5N replaced the B4Y1 as the primary carrier attack aircraft in 1940, though the type did remain in service as an advanced trainer, and frequently flew from Hōshō and Unyō until 1943. Amongst other engagements, the B4Y was present at the Battle of Midway during June 1942, where eight of them were operated from Hōshō. It was one of these aircraft from Hōshō which took photographs of the burning Hiryū on 5 June 1942.

== Variants ==
First prototype
559 kW (750 hp) Hiro Type 91 520 hp water-cooled W-12 driving a twin-bladed propeller.
Second and third prototypes
477 kW (640 hp) Nakajima Kotobuki 3 nine-cylinder air-cooled radial driving a twin-bladed propeller.
Fourth and fifth prototype and production aircraft
636 kW (853 hp) Nakajima Hikari 2 nine-cylinder air-cooled radial driving a twin-bladed propeller.

== Operators ==
Japan

- Imperial Japanese Navy Air Service

The B4Y1 was operated from the aircraft carriers Akagi, Hōshō, Kaga, Ryūjō, Sōryū, and Unyō, as well as the 13th and 15th Kōkūtai (Air Groups).

== Specifications (B4Y1) ==
Data from Japanese Aircraft of the Pacific War

General characteristics

- Crew: Three (pilot, navigator, radio operator/gunner)
- Length: 10.15 m (33 ft 4 in)
- Wingspan: 15 m (49 ft 3 in)
- Height: 4.36 m (14 ft 4 in)
- Wing area: 50 m^{2} (540 sq ft)
- Empty weight: 2,000 kg (4,409 lb)
- Gross weight: 3,600 kg (7,937 lb)
- Powerplant: 1 × Nakajima Hikari 2 nine-cylinder air-cooled radial piston engine, 630 kW (840 hp) for take-off

522 kW (700 hp) at 1,200 m (3,900 ft)

- Propellers: 2-bladed fixed-pitch propeller

Performance

- Maximum speed: 278 km/h (173 mph, 150 kn)
- Range: 573 km (356 mi, 309 nmi)
- Service ceiling: 6,000 m (20,000 ft)
- Time to altitude: 3,000 m (9,800 ft)
- Wing loading: 72 kg/m^{2} (15 lb/sq ft)
- Power/mass: 0.1749 kW/kg (0.1064 hp/lb)

Armament

- Guns: 1× flexibly mounted, rearward-firing 7.7 mm (0.303 in) Type 92 machine gun
- Bombs: 1× 800 kg (1,764 lb) torpedo, or 500 kg (1,102 lb) of bombs

== See also ==
- List of military aircraft of Japan
