= Yatsenko I-28 =

Soviet fighter plane

General information
- Type: Single-seat fighter
- National origin: Soviet Union
- Manufacturer: Yatsenko OKB
- Designer: Vladmir Yatsenko
- Number built: 7

History
- First flight: 10 June 1939

The Yatsenko I-28 was a 1930s Soviet single-seat fighter designed by Vladmir Yatsenko and first flown in 1939. The I-28 was a low-wing cantilever monoplane of mixed construction powered by a 900 hp (671 kW) Tumansky M-87 radial piston engine. It had an enclosed single-seat cockpit with a rearwards sliding canopy. The wing had an inverted-gull shape to reduce the length of the retractable main landing legs. The prototype was destroyed shortly after the first flight but an order was placed for 30 production aircraft. Also ordered was a prototype of an attack version, the I-28Sh. Although the first five production aircraft were completed the programme was cancelled in early 1940.

== Variants ==
I-28.1
First prototype powered by a Tumansky M-87A radial engine.
I-28.2
Second prototype powered by a Tumansky M-87B radial engine.
I-28
Production variant, canceled.
I-28Sh
Proposed attack variant, not built.

== Specifications (I.28-2) ==
Data from The History of Soviet Aircraft from 1918

General characteristics

- Crew: 1
- Length: 8.54 m (28 ft 0 in)
- Wingspan: 9.6 m (31 ft 6 in)
- Wing area: 16.5 m^{2} (178 sq ft)
- Empty weight: 1,850 kg (4,079 lb)
- Gross weight: 2,720 kg (5,997 lb)
- Powerplant: 1 × Tumansky M-87B radial piston engine , 820 kW (1,100 hp)

Performance

- Maximum speed: 576 km/h (359 mph, 312 kn)
- Range: 800 km (497 mi, 432 nmi)
- Service ceiling: 10,800 m (35,600 ft)

Armament
2x 12.7mm ShVAK machine gun in cowling

== See also ==
Aircraft of comparable role, configuration, and era Polikarpov I-180
