= Yokosuka Ro-gō Type A =

Japanese reconnaissance floatplane

Ro-gō Type A
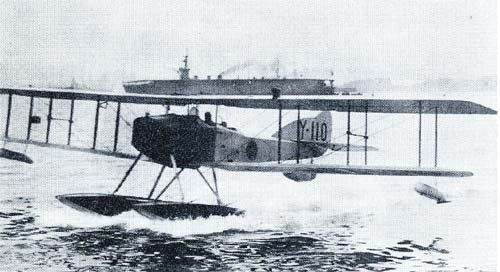

General information
- Type: Reconnaissance floatplane
- National origin: Japan
- Manufacturer: Yokosuka Naval Air Technical Arsenal
- Status: out of service
- Primary user: Imperial Japanese Navy
- Number built: 218

History
- Introduction date: 1918
- Retired: 1928

The Yokosuka Ro-gō Type A (横廠式ロ号甲型, Yokoshō-shiki Ro-gō Kō-gata) was a Japanese reconnaissance floatplane developed during the First World War by the Japanese Navy Arsenal at Yokosuka, and one of the first indigenous Japanese aircraft to enter production. There were 218 of these aircraft built for the Imperial Japanese Navy, which remained in use until 1928.

== Development and design ==
The Japanese Navy Arsenal at Yokosuka became involved in aircraft production in 1913, when an aeroplane factory was set up, with its first work being to build several Maurice Farman and Curtiss Seaplanes. It continued to build aircraft under license, including more Farman aircraft and several Short 184 seaplanes, as well as prototypes of several of its own designs.

In 1917, Chikuhei Nakajima, chief designer of the Yokosuka Arsenal aircraft factory designed a new reconnaissance floatplane. A prototype of this new design, powered by a 140 hp (104 kW) Salmson water-cooled radial engine, made its maiden flight early in 1918. Test results were good, and the type was ordered into production as the Ro-gō Type A.^{[a]}

The Ro-gō Type A was a three-bay biplane of wood and fabric construction, with twin main floats and wings that folded backwards for storage. Its crew of two sat in separate, closely spaced cockpits. Initial production aircraft were powered by 200 hp (149 kW) Salmson engines, but the majority of production aircraft were fitted with 200–220 hp (149–164 kW) Mitsubishi-built Hispano-Suiza 8 V-8 engines.

A total of 218 aircraft were built in total, 32 by the Yokosuka arsenal, 80 by Aichi and 106 by the Nakajima Aircraft Company, with production continuing until 1924. It was the first locally-designed aircraft to be built in large numbers for the Japanese Navy.

== Operational history ==
Three of the early aircraft were modified in 1919 for making long-range flights, with one of the cockpits replaced by additional fuel storage. This allowed a record flight of 1,300 km (808 mi) to be flown in 11 hours, 35 min on 20 April 1919. The Ro-gō Type A, along with licensed built Hansa-Brandenburg W.29s, replaced the obsolete pusher Farmans in Japanese Navy service, remaining in large scale service until 1926, being re-designated Yokosho-Type Reconnaissance Seaplane in 1923.^{[b]} Several were sold for civilian use, and were used to carry airmail until 1928.

== Units using this aircraft ==
Japan

- Imperial Japanese Navy

== Specifications (Production type) ==
Data from Japanese Aircraft 1914–1941

General characteristics

- Crew: 2
- Length: 10.16 m (33 ft 4 in)
- Wingspan: 15.692 m (51 ft 6 in)
- Height: 3.666 m (12 ft 0 in)
- Wing area: 48.22 m^{2} (519.0 sq ft)
- Empty weight: 1,070 kg (2,359 lb)
- Gross weight: 1,628 kg (3,589 lb)
- Powerplant: 1 × Mitsubishi type Hi water-cooled V8 engine, 160 kW (220 hp)
- Propellers: 2-bladed

Performance

- Maximum speed: 156 km/h (97 mph, 84 kn)
- Range: 780 km (480 mi, 420 nmi)
- Endurance: 5 hr
- Time to altitude: 4 min to 500 m (1,640 ft)

Armament

- Guns: 1× flexibly mounted 7.7 mm machine gun

== Notes ==
- ^{a} Under the designation system introduced by the Imperial Japanese Navy in 1918, this designation corresponded to "Type A" reconnaissance aircraft.
- ^{b} Yokosho was an acronym standing for Yokosuka Kaigun Ko-Sho (Yokosuka Naval Arsenal).

== Bibliography ==
- Donald, David (ed.) The Encyclopedia of World Aircraft. Leicester, UK: Blitz Editions, 1997. ISBN 1-85605-375-X.
- Mikesh, Robert and Abe, Shorzoe. Japanese Aircraft 1910-1941. London:Putnam, 1990. ISBN 0-85177-840-2.
