= Yokosuka Naval Air Technical Arsenal =

Imperial Japanese Navy arsenal

- Kaigun Kōkū Gijutsu-shō (海軍航空技術廠)
- Part of Imperial Japanese Navy
- Yokosuka
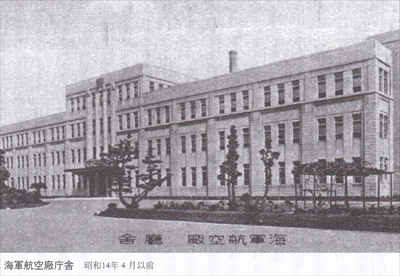
- Yokosuka Naval Arsenal before April, 1939

Site history
- Built: 1913
- Built by: Imperial Japanese Navy

Yokosuka Naval Air Technical Arsenal (海軍航空技術廠, Kaigun Kōkū Gijutsu-shō; lit. Naval Air Technical Arsenal) had many names, each depending on the period of its existence, and the circumstances at that time. Many of the names were acronyms that were derived from its military name or designation, which changed from time to time. The arsenal was sometimes known as "Kūgi-shō" (空技廠, a contraction of "Kōkū Gijutsu-shō" 航空技術廠). The name Yokosuka prevailed however, even though it referred to the Arsenal's location at Yokosuka, Japan.

== History ==
The air arsenal's roots go back to 1869 when the Imperial Japanese Navy (IJN) established a naval arsenal at Yokosuka, about 13 miles south of Yokohama on Tokyo Bay. The arsenal provided ship building, repair and replenishment to the Japanese Navy. It was also a storage depot where munitions and other assorted supplies were brought as they were purchased.

When a number of foreign aircraft were purchased for evaluation, the Navy brought them to the arsenal for processing. The arsenal assembled the aircraft from their shipping boxes, and when assembled, they were flown by the pilots who had been sent abroad for flying lessons and evaluate the aircraft flown.

Modifications to these aircraft were done as weaknesses were found, or when an improvement was incorporated. To facilitate this work, the IJN established the Aeroplane Factory, Ordnance Department at the arsenal's torpedo factory in May 1913.

The next year, the first acronym was used was Yokosho, a contraction of Yokosuka Kaigun Kōshō (Yokosuka Naval Arsenal). The arsenal was renamed Kaigun Kōkū Shiken-sho (Naval Establishment for Aeronautical Research) in December 1919. The name Kaigun Gijutsu Kenkyūsho (Naval Technical Research Institute) was assigned by April, 1923, when the arsenal was moved to Tsukiji with several other Naval support units. The entire Tsukiji facility was destroyed in the 1923 Great Kantō earthquake. Several names were used when the navy began establishment of the arsenal. Research was started again in 1924 when several aircraft were evaluated. Under the command of the newly formed Naval Air Headquarters, the Kaigun Kokusho (Naval Air Arsenal) was formed at Yokosuka on 1 April 1932. A large amount of draftsmen and Designers were transferred from the Hiro Naval Arsenal, ending aircraft production there.

== The war years ==
During World War II, the arsenal was responsible for the design of several IJN aircraft, although the arsenal itself did not manufacture more than a few prototypes of the aircraft it designed. Its designs were mass-produced by companies such as Aichi Kokuki, Watanabe Tekkōjo steel foundry, (renamed in 1943 to Kyūshū Hikōki Kabushiki-kaisha (九州飛行機株式会社, Kyushu Aircraft Company Ltd; a.k.a. Kyushu Armaments) ), and the Hiro Naval Arsenal (Hiro Kaigun Kōshō; which is often abbreviated as Hirosho). Aircraft designed by the arsenal are usually designated by the manufacturer's letter "Y" for "Yokosuka".

An example of the above is the Yokosuka D4Y1 which was mainly produced by Aichi. The D4Y1 and later models were also produced by the 11th Naval Arsenal (Dai-Jūichi Kaigun Kōkū-shō) at Hiro.

== Aircraft ==
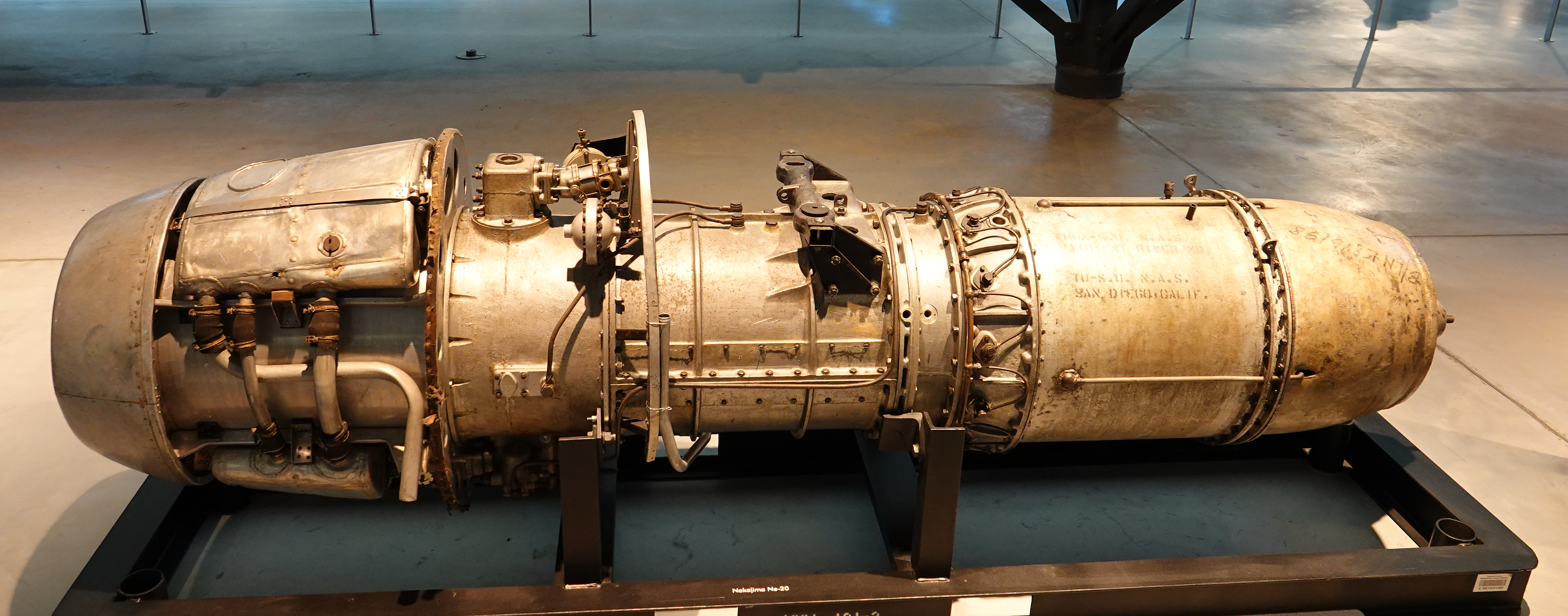
The Ne-20 Jet engine manufactured by Yokosuka, Displayed in Steven F. Udvar-Hazy Center Air Museum

Torpedo bomber

- Yokosuka Twin-engined Seaplane - 1916 biplane torpedo bomber; first Japanese twin-engine aircraft
- B3Y - Type 92 Carrier Attack Bomber (九二式艦上攻撃機) -1933 biplane torpedo bomber
- B4Y - Type 96 Carrier Attack Bomber (九六式艦上攻撃機) - 'Jean' 1936 biplane torpedo bomber

Dive bomber

- D2Y - prototype dive bomber, lost to the Aichi D1A
- D3Y - Myojo (明星, Venus) or Type 99 Practice Bomber Model 12 (九九式練習用爆撃機一二型) - 1945 two-seat dive bomber/trainer based on the Aichi D3A
- D4Y - Suisei (彗星, Comet) - 'Judy' 1942 two-seat carrier-based dive bomber
- D5Y - Myojo-kai (明星改, Venus modified) - Kamikaze version of the D3Y

Reconnaissance aircraft

- Yokosuka Nakajima Tractor - 1915 reconnaissance seaplane
- Ho-gō Type B Seaplane - 1916 reconnaissance seaplane
- Ho-gō Small Seaplane - 1917 reconnaissance seaplane
- Ro-gō Type A - 1918 reconnaissance floatplane
- D4Y1-C - Type 2 Carrier Recon Aircraft Model 11 (二式艦上偵察機11型) - 1942 ship-based reconnaissance version of D4Y, produced by Aichi
- E1Y - Type 14 Recon Seaplane (一四式水上偵察機) - 1923 reconnaissance floatplane
- Tatsu-gō Reconnaissance Seaplane - 1925 reconnaissance seaplane prototype
- 1-gō Reconnaissance Seaplane - 1925 submarine-based reconnaissance seaplane
- E5Y - Type 90-3 Recon Seaplane (九〇式三号水上偵察機) - 1930 reconnaissance floatplane
- E6Y - Type 91 Recon Seaplane (九一式水上偵察機) - 1933 submarine-based reconnaissance floatplane
- E14Y - Type 0 Small Recon Seaplane (零式小型水上偵察機) - 'Glen' 1941 submarine-based reconnaissance floatplane
- R1Y - Seiun (暁雲, Dawn Cloud) - prototype reconnaissance aircraft
- R2Y - Keiun (景雲, Cirrus Cloud) - 1945 prototype reconnaissance aircraft

Flying boat

- H5Y - Type 99 Flying Boat (九九式飛行艇) - 'Cherry' 1939 maritime reconnaissance flying boat
- H7Y - 'Tillie' 1939 prototype flying boat

Trainer

- I-gō Type A - 1920 seaplane trainer
- K1Y - Type 13 Trainer (一三式練習機) - 1925 biplane trainer
- K2Y - Type 3 Primary Trainer (三式陸上初歩練習機) - Japanese-built Avro 504
- K4Y - Type 90 Primary Trainer Seaplane (九〇式水上初歩練習機) - 1933 floatplane trainer
- K5Y - Type 93 Intermediate Trainer (九三式中間練習機) -'Willow' 1934 biplane trainer

Transport

- L3Y - Type 96 Land based Transport Aircraft (九六式陸上輸送機) - Yokosuka-built transport version of Mitsubishi G3M

Special purpose

- MXY1 - 1939 experimental parasol monoplane for aerodynamic research; built by Watanabe
- MXY2
- MXY3 - experimental radio-controlled target glider (drone)
- MXY4 - experimental radio-controlled target aircraft (drone)
- MXY5 - transport glider
- MXY6 - unpowered gliders for development of the Kyushu J7W
- MXY7 - Ohka (櫻花, Cherry Blossom) - 'Baka' 1945 rocket-powered kamikaze attack aircraft
- MXY8 - Akigusa (秋草, Autumn Grass) - training glider based on the Mitsubishi J8M; known as Ku-13 in IJA service
- MXY9 - Shuka (秋花, Autumn Flower) - motorjet powered version of MXY-8 (project only)
- MXY10 - ground non-flying decoy of P1Y
- MXY11 - ground non-flying decoy of Mitsubishi G4M

Bomber

- P1Y Ginga (銀河, Galaxy) - 'Frances' 1944 twin-engine bomber
- Tenga (天河, Milky Way) - jet-powered version of the P1Y (project only)
