= Yokosuka E14Y =

Japanese recoinnaissance seaplane

E14Y
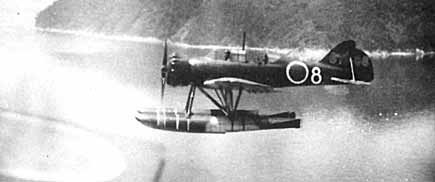

General information
- Type: Submarine-based reconnaissance seaplane
- National origin: Japan
- Manufacturer: Yokosuka Naval Air Technical Arsenal
- Primary user: Imperial Japanese Navy
- Number built: 126

History
- Introduction date: 1941
- First flight: 1939
- Retired: 1943

The Yokosuka E14Y (service designation "Type 0 Small Reconnaissance Seaplane" (零式小型水上偵察機)) was an reconnaissance seaplane designed by the Japanese defence manufacturer Yokosuka Naval Air Technical Arsenal and produced by aircraft company Watanabe. It was purpose-designed to be transported aboard and launched from Imperial Japanese Navy (IJN) submarine aircraft carriers, such as the I-25. Operated during World War II, it was assigned the Allied reporting name Glen.

Developed during the late 1930s to fulfil the 12-Shi specification, the design process was led by Mitsuo Yamada. Various features of the E14Y, from folding elements of its tail unit and ability to be dismantled for stowage, were to facilitate its use within a space-constrained watertight hangar of an IJN submarine. While intended to perform reconnaissance, it could also carry up to 60 kg of bombs. The prototype was competitively trialled against the Watanabe E14W; while the E14Y proved to be superior, its production was handled by Watanabe rather than Yokosuka. On 17 December 1941, the E14Y performed its first operational mission, an aerial damage assessment of Pearl Harbor following the Japanese attack.

Operated from the IJN's submarines, the E14Y benefitted from limited Allied radar coverage early on in the conflict to perform numerous aerial reconnaissance flights over Allied-held territories, including in Australia, New Zealand, Africa, Madagascar, and the Aleutians. One such flight performed the attack on Sydney Harbour in the summer of 1942. Furthermore, the E14Y was the only Axis aircraft to drop bombs on the mainland United States, the incident becoming commonly known as the The Lookout Air Raid.

== Design and development ==
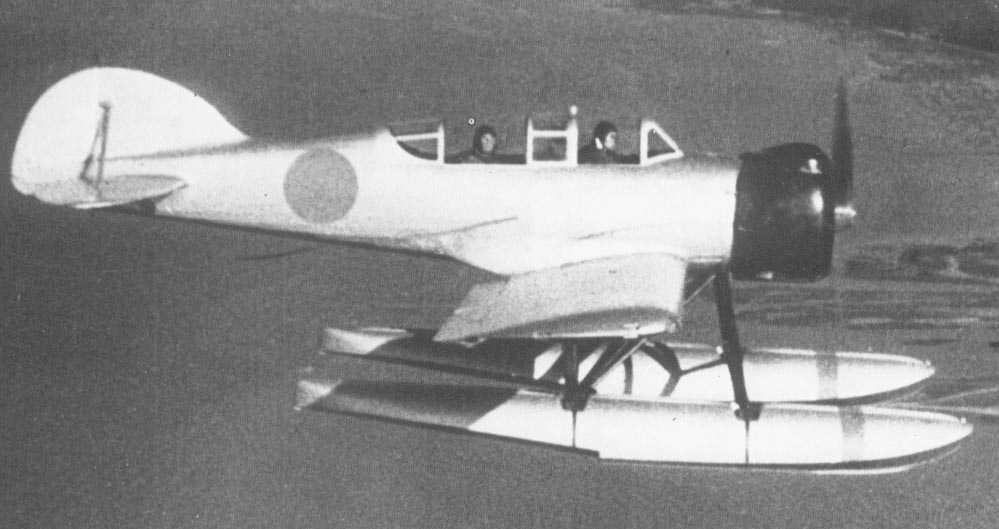
Prototype Yokosuka E14Y in flight. Note the lower profile rudder present

Starting in the late 1920s, the Imperial Japanese Navy (IJN) had developed a doctrine of operating floatplanes from its submarines to search for targets. During the late 1930s, the Imperial Japanese Navy Aviation Bureau (Kaigun Kōkū Hombu) issued the 12-Shi specification, (Note: In the Japanese Navy designation system, specifications were given a Shi number based on the year of the Emperor's reign it was issued. In this case 12-Shi stood for 1937, the 12th year of the Shōwa era.) which sought a compact seaplane for aerial reconnaissance suitable for operating from submarines. Accordingly, work commenced at the Yokosuka Naval Air Technical Arsenal towards fulfilling this specification; the design effort was headed by Mitsuo Yamada.

The resulting floatplane featured mixed construction; its fuselage was built around a welded tubular steel structure that was covered by a combination of fabric, wood, and lightweight alloys. The wings, which were covered by fabric, used a combination of light metal spars and wooden ribs. Buoyancy was produced via a pair of floats connected to the fuselage via struts. To facilitate the seaplane's use from a space-constrained watertight hangar, it was designed to be readily dismantled for more convenient stowage; specifically, the floats and supporting struts were detachable from the fuselage while the wings would, at the spar fittings, also detach from the fuselage. As originally designed, the floatplane was to be furnished with low-aspect ratio vertical tail surfaces to permit it to fit within the dimensions of the submarine hangar, however, this initial arrangement was later substituted for higher surfaces that comprised detachable upper fin sections during the flight test phase of development.

It was typically operated by a crew of two, a pilot and observer, who were seated in tandem within enclosed cockpits. Armament comprised a single rear-facing flexibly-mounted Type 92 machine gun and up to 60 kg of bombs; increased bombloads could be carried when the floatplane was flown solo. Power was provided by a single Hitachi GK2 Tempu 12 nine-cylinder radial engine, which produced up to 340 hp and drove a twin-bladed wooden propeller.

Construction of the prototype E14Y was completed in 1939, permitting it to conduct competitive trials against the rival Watanabe E14W. While Yokosuka's submission emerged as the victor, the resulting production contract was awarded to Watanabe. Accordingly, Yokosuka did not manufacture any of the subsequent production aircraft, which were officially designated Navy Type 0 Small Reconnaissance Seaplane Model 11. In total, 126 E14Ys were produced, all of which were operated by the IJN.

== Operational history ==
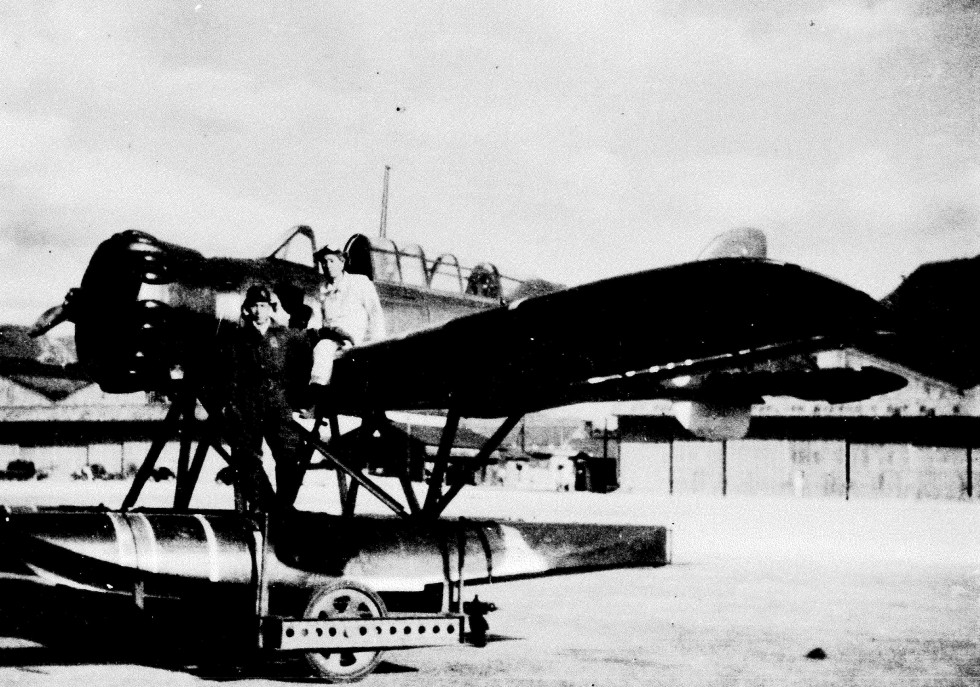
Nobuo Fujita, the only Axis pilot to drop bombs on the US mainland during World War II, and his E14Y

On 17 December 1941, the E14Y performed its first operational mission, launching from Japanese submarine I-7 to conduct an aerial damage assessment that had been inflicted during Japan's Attack on Pearl Harbor eight days earlier. It would conduct aerial reconnaissance missions across a range of regions throughout the Pacific War, including of locations in Australia, New Zealand, Africa, Madagascar, and the Aleutians. E14Ys would often support the Axis's submarine force during commercial raiding, however, its inability to operate during rough sea conditions would hamper these missions.

On 26 February 1942, the Japanese submarine I-25, under the command of Captain Akiji Tagami, was off the northern tip of King Island in Bass Strait off the coast of Victoria, Australia, when an E14Y was launched on a reconnaissance flight over the Port of Melbourne. The pilot and observer/gunner were in the air for three hours, during which time they successfully flew over Port Phillip Bay and observed the ships at anchor off Melbourne, before returning to land on its floats beside the submarine, where it was winched aboard and disassembled.

The E14Y is the only Japanese aircraft to overfly New Zealand during World War II (and only the second enemy aircraft after the German Friedrichshafen FF.33 'Wölfchen' during World War I). On 8 March 1942, Warrant Officer Nobuo Fujita photographed the Allied build-up in Wellington harbour in a "Glen" launched from the Japanese submarine I-25. On 13 March, Fujita flew over Auckland, before the I-25 proceeded to Australia. On the night of 24/25 May, Warrant Officer Susumo Ito flew a "Glen" over Auckland from the Japanese submarine I-21. Just days later, in the same aircraft, Ito flew the reconnaissance flight preceding the sole Japanese attack on Sydney Harbour in which 21 seamen were killed when HMAS Kuttabul sank on 1 June 1942.

Prior to 1943, E14Y flights were more successful due to poor Allied radar coverage; however, these circumstances changed dramatically as the conflict progressed. Type A1 submarine I-9 was caught off the New Zealand coast in early 1943; however, no Japanese aircraft were observed, and any records of overflights were lost when the submarine was sunk.

The E14Y also has the distinction of being the only submarine-based aircraft to drop bombs on the United States during World War II, in an incident known as The Lookout Air Raid. On 9 September 1942, Chief Warrant Officer Nobuo Fujita, a pilot in the Japanese Imperial Navy, and his crewman, Petty Officer Shoji Okuda, surfaced in submarine I-25 off the coast of Oregon near Brookings. The seaplane had folding wings and was transported in a watertight capsule attached to the deck of the submarine. The bombs – 76 kg (168 lb) incendiaries intended to cause forest fires – caused no injuries or real damage.

== Surviving aircraft ==
Aviation History magazine reported in the November 2008 issue that divers had found airplane parts in the Akibasan Maru wreck, a Japanese cargo ship sunk in the Kwajalein Atoll on 20 January 1944 and rediscovered in 1965. The parts (including wings and floats) were finally identified (April 2008) as belonging to a pair of E14Y1 floatplanes, through the use of photographs from the wreck and comparisons with original technical drawings and a captured technical manual.

== Specifications (E14Y) ==
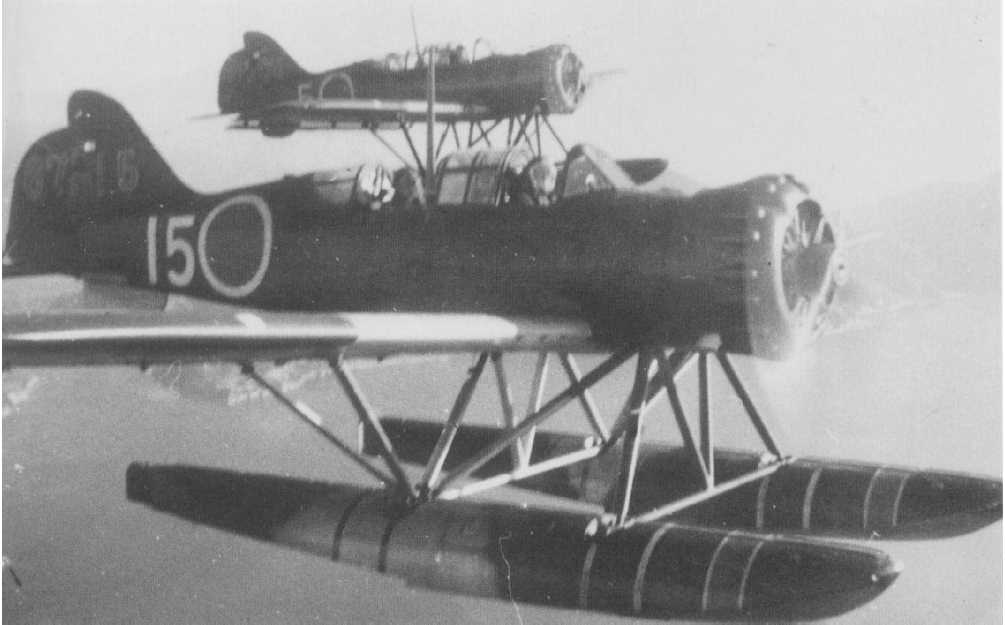
A pair of E14Ys in flight

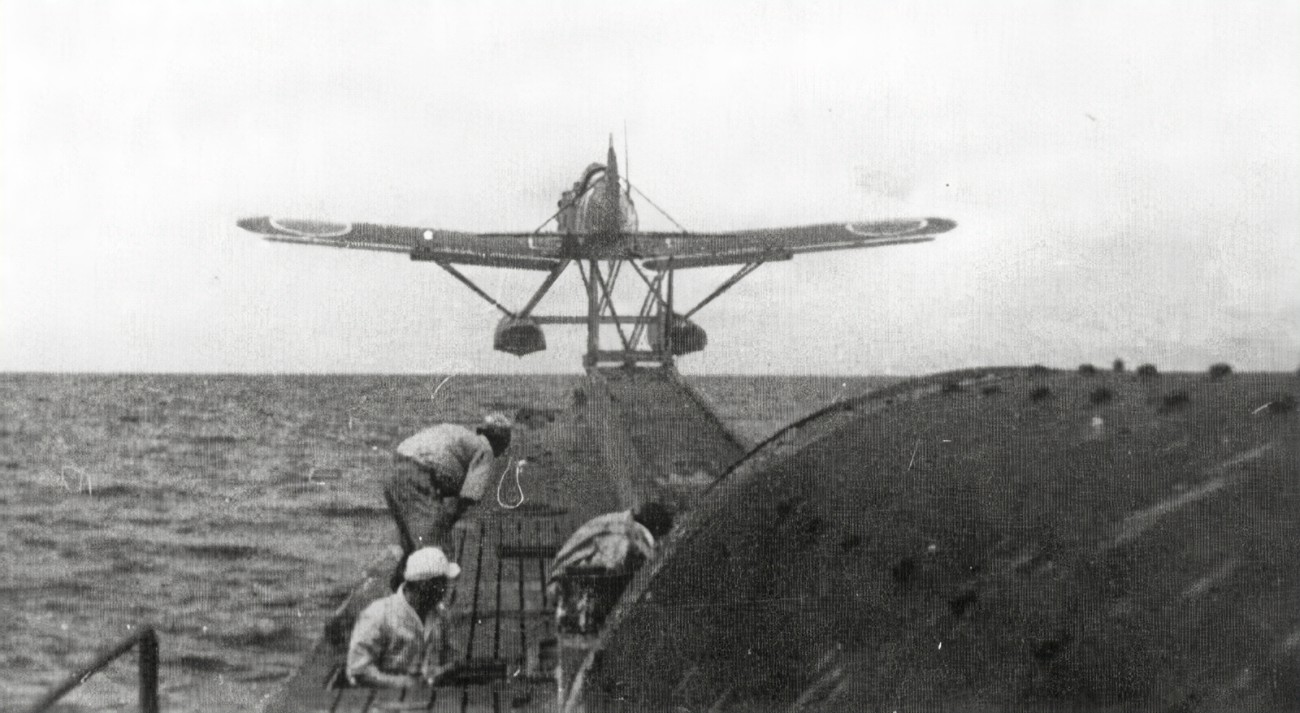
A E14Y being prepared for launch onboard IJN submarine I-25 for the raid on Port Orford, Oregon, 20 June 1942

Data from Japanese Aircraft of the Pacific War

General characteristics

- Crew: 2 (pilot and observer)
- Length: 8.54 m (28 ft 0 in)
- Wingspan: 11 m (36 ft 1 in)
- Height: 3.8 m (12 ft 6 in)
- Wing area: 19 m^{2} (200 sq ft)
- Empty weight: 1,119 kg (2,467 lb)
- Gross weight: 1,450 kg (3,197 lb)
- Max takeoff weight: 1,600 kg (3,527 lb)
- Powerplant: 1 × Hitachi GK2 Tempu 12 nine-cylinder air-cooled radial piston engine, 250 kW (340 hp) for take-off, 220 kW (300 hp) at sea level
- Propellers: 2-bladed wooden propeller

Performance

- Maximum speed: 246 km/h (153 mph, 133 kn) at sea level
- Cruise speed: 167 km/h (104 mph, 90 kn) at 1,000 m (3,300 ft)
- Range: 881 km (547 mi, 476 nmi)
- Service ceiling: 5,240 m (17,200 ft)
- Time to altitude: 3,000 m (9,800 ft) in ten minutes and 11 seconds
- Wing loading: 76.3 kg/m^{2} (15.6 lb/sq ft)
- Power/mass: 0.1749 kW/kg (0.1064 hp/lb)

Armament

- Guns: 1× flexible, rearward-firing 7.7 mm (0.303 in) Type 92 machine gun for the observer
- Bombs: 2× 76 kg (168 lb) bombs (various)

== See also ==
Aircraft of comparable role, configuration, and era

- Aichi M6A
- Arado Ar 231
- Besson MB.411
- Watanabe E9W

Related lists

- List of flying boats and floatplanes
- List of submarine-borne aircraft
