= Aichi F1A =

Japanese reconnaissance floatplane

F1A

General information
- Type: Reconnaissance floatplane
- National origin: Empire of Japan
- Manufacturer: Aichi
- Number built: 2

History
- First flight: 1936

The Aichi F1A (designated AB-13 by its designers and manufacturers at Aichi) was a prototype Japanese floatplane of the 1930s. A single-engined biplane, the F1A was intended as a short-range observation aircraft suitable for operation off the Imperial Japanese navy's warships, but only two were built, the Mitsubishi F1M being selected instead.

== Design and development ==
The F1A was designed by Aichi in response to a 1935 specification, issued to Aichi, Kawanishi and Mitsubishi for a replacement for the Imperial Japanese Navy's Nakajima E8N floatplanes, which were used for short-ranged reconnaissance and observation missions from the Navy's warships. Aichi at first considered a low-winged monoplane design, the AM-10, to meet this requirement, but this was rejected in favour of a more conventional biplane design, the AB-13.

The AB-13 was a small single-bay biplane of mixed construction. It had wooden stressed-skin wings with plywood skinning that folded to allow easy storage aboard ship, while combat flaps were fitted as the aircraft was required to have sufficient maneuverability for air combat as well as its normal observation missions. The fuselage was of metal construction, with the pilot sitting in an open cockpit, but the observer's position being enclosed. Both float and wheeled undercarriages were designed, with the seaplane having a single main float, while the landplane version had a fixed tailwheel undercarriage. Power was provided by a single Nakajima Hikari radial engine.

== Operational history ==
Two prototypes of the AB-13, designated Experimental 10-Shi^{[a]} Observation Aircraft and with the short system designation F1A were built, the first a floatplane and the second with wheeled undercarriage, both being completed in 1936. Although Mitsubishi's competing F1M1 prototypes had poor stability both on the water and in the air, they had superior performance to Aichi's design. Mitsubishi redesigned its aircraft as the F1M2, eliminating its handling problems, and it was selected for production in 1940.

== Specifications (Floatplane) ==
Data from Japanese Aircraft, 1910–1941

General characteristics

- Crew: 2
- Length: 9.30 m (30 ft 6 in)
- Wingspan: 11.00 m (36 ft 1 in)
- Height: 4.10 m (13 ft 5 in)
- Wing area: 28.0 m^{2} (301.399 sq ft)
- Empty weight: 1,400 kg (3,086 lb)
- Gross weight: 2,100 kg (4,629 lb)
- Max takeoff weight: 2,380 kg (5,247 lb)
- Powerplant: 1 × Nakajima Hikari 1 nine-cylinder air-cooled radial engine, 610 kW (820 hp)

Performance

- Maximum speed: 386 km/h (240 mph, 207.8 kn) at 3,000 m (9,840 ft)
- Stall speed: 95.4 km/h (59.3 mph, 51.5 kn)
- Range: 1,449 km (900 mi, 783 nmi) at 185 km/h (100 knots, 115 mph)
- Endurance: 8 hr 30 min
- Service ceiling: 9,275 m (30,430 ft)
- Time to altitude: 3,000 m (9,840 ft) in 4 min 26 s

Armament

- Guns: 2× fixed forward firing 7.7 mm machine guns, 1 machine gun in rear cockpit
