= Aichi E13A =

Japanese reconnaissance floatplane

E13A
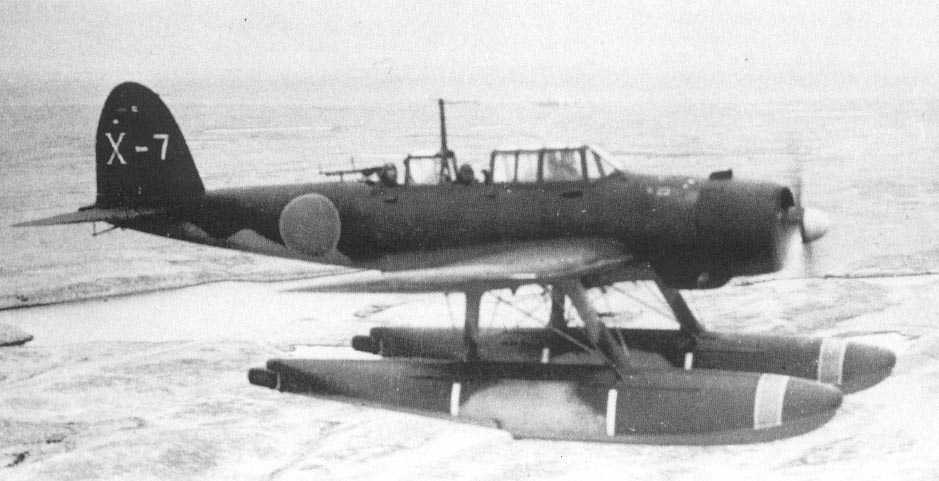
- E13A1 in flight

General information
- Type: Reconnaissance floatplane
- Manufacturer: Aichi Kokuki KK
- Primary users: Imperial Japanese Navy Air Service Royal Thai Navy; French Naval Aviation
- Number built: 1,418

History
- Introduction date: 1941
- First flight: mid-late 1939
- Retired: 1947

The Aichi E13A (Allied reporting name: "Jake") is a long-range reconnaissance seaplane designed and produced by the Japanese aviation company Aichi Kokuki KK. The Imperial Japanese Navy (IJN) designation was "Navy Type 0 Reconnaissance Seaplane" (零式水上偵察機).

Development of the E13A started in 1937 in response to an Imperial Japanese Navy (IJN) specification for a twin-seat reconnaissance floatplane, although this was effectively superseded by a later specification for a larger three-seat floatplane. The E13A could carry a crew of three and a bombload of 250 kg (550 lb), and was suitable for performing coastal patrols, anti-shipping, liaison, personnel transports, and air-sea rescues amongst other roles. The prototype, which made its maiden flight in late 1938, proved superior to the twin-seat E12A1 and was awarded a production contract from the IJN in December 1940. In addition to Aichi, both Kyushu Hikoki and the Hiro Naval Arsenal, would manufacture the type.

Introduced to service with the IJN in 1941, the E13A became one of the most important floatplanes operated by the service due to its numbers. First used during the Second Sino-Japanese War, it was used extensively throughout the Pacific War, from flying reconnaissance missions in support of the Attack on Pearl Harbor to occasionally being deployed as a bomber in uncontested skies, from ship and shore bases alike. The E13A was withdrawn from IJN service shortly after the Surrender of Japan, although numerous other operators would make (typically brief) use of abandoned aircraft.

== Design and development ==
As the Empire of Japan expanded during the early 20th century, it became commonplace for the Imperial Japanese Navy (IJN) to provide escorts to maritime convoys that were operating outside of the range of land-based aircraft. In response to this dilemma, the service made increasingly heavy use of floatplanes, to the extent that, by the outbreak of World War II, the IJN operated more reconnaissance floatplanes than any other air service. In June 1937, the Naval Staff issued a 12-Shi specification seeking a twin-seat reconnaissance floatplane to replace the Kawanishi E7K2 to numerous Japanese aircraft manufacturers, including Aichi Kokuki KK, Nakajima, and Kawanishi. Months later, another specification emerged that called for a three-seat reconnaissance floatplane that possessed greater range and speed than the prior specification had sought. In contrast to Nakajima, which opted to focus on the twin-seat requirement, and Kawanishi, which pursued the three-seat requirement, Aichi opted to simultaneously work on two designs, one for each requirement.

Aichi's design team, headed by Kishiro Matsuo, designed that the E13A would be heavily based on the twin-seat E12A1, essentially being a larger and more powerful version of this aircraft. In late 1938, the first prototype was completed and promptly proved itself to be superior to the E12A1 prototypes during manufacturer's trials, possessing better performance in terms of both stability and manoeuvrability despite its bigger dimensions and greater weight. By this point, IJN officials were increasingly favouring the three-seat requirement over the earlier twin-seat specification, thus the company decided to suspend work on the E12A1 to focus on the more promising E13A.

In December 1940, the E13A1 was selected as the winner and was accepted for production as the Navy Type 0 Reconnaissance Seaplane Model 1. While initially produced solely by Aichi, due to increasing demand for the company's products, it was decided to involve two other entities, Kyushu Hikoki and the Hiro Naval Arsenal, in producing the E13A in 1942. No major changes were made for the first four years of the type's production; in 1944, the E13A1 and E13A2 emerged. While the former was outfitted with improved radio apparatus, the latter benefitted from air-to-surface radar; both models could be fitted with exhaust flame suppressors (for night time operations) and a 20 mm cannon (intended for use against patrol boats).

== Operational history ==
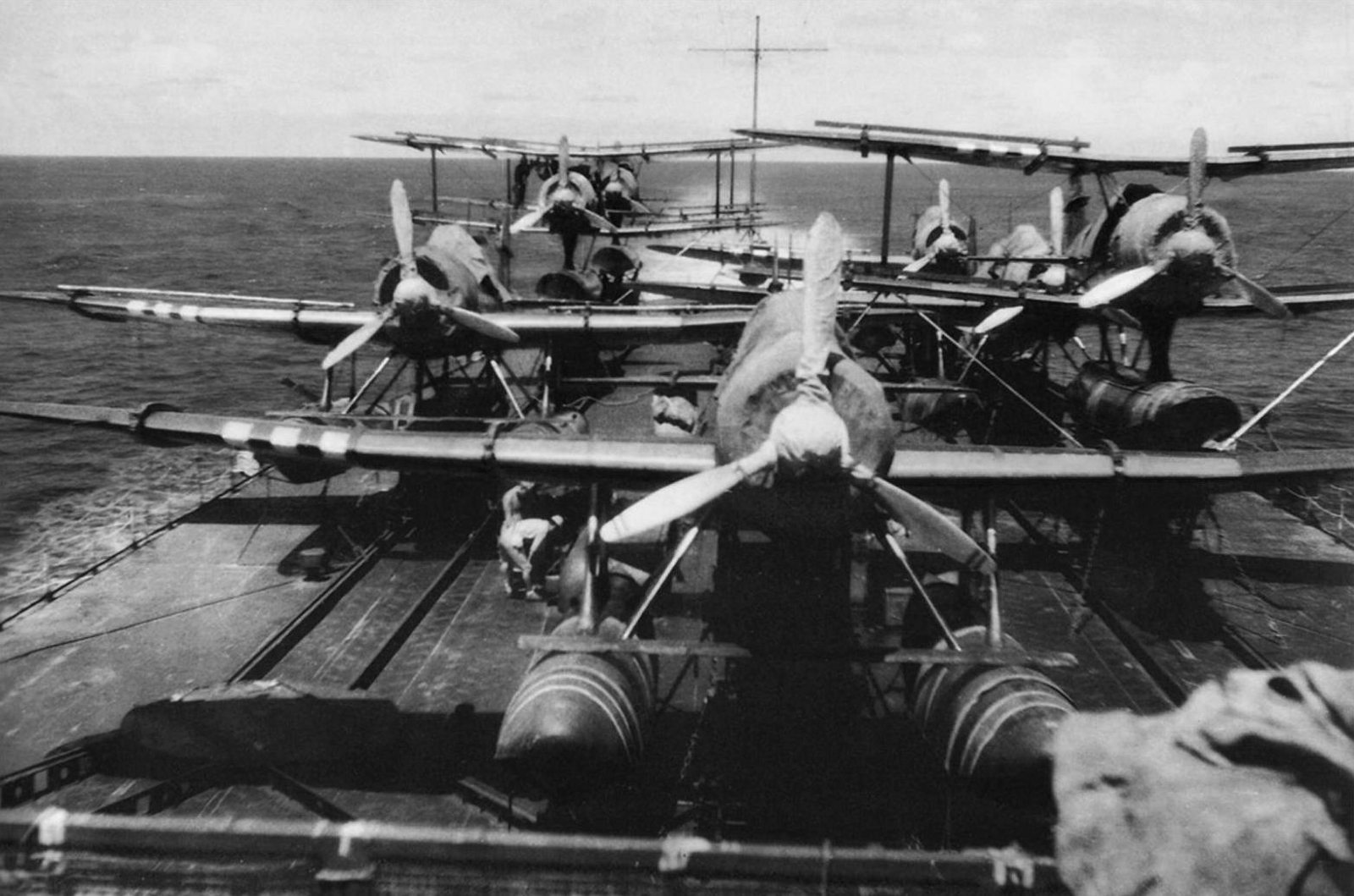
Multiple E13As on the flight deck of Mogami, August 1943

In 1941, the E13A made its combat debut during the Second Sino-Japanese War; in this theatre, the type was typically operated from seaplane tenders and cruisers, from which it conducted numerous anti-shipping patrols as well as strikes on the Canton-Hankou railway.

In December 1941, cruiser-based E13As were used to perform reconnaissance for the Attack on Pearl Harbor at the initiation of the Pacific War. Thereafter, it was routinely used in combat against the United States Navy, such as during the Battles of Coral Sea and Midway. The type was in service throughout the conflict, operating from both ship and shore bases alike, and typically performed coastal patrols, anti-shipping, liaison, personnel transports, air-sea rescues, and other missions. When there was only limited aerial opposition from the Allies, the E13A would occasionally be deployed to perform bombing missions.

Along with the Mitsubishi F1M, the E13A served on the Yamato-class battleships as catapult-launched reconnaissance aircraft, replacing the Nakajima E8N. During the final year of the war, numerous E13As were expended performing kamikaze missions.

During the conflict, one E13A was operated by Nazi Germany alongside two Arado Ar 196s out of the German Gruppe Monsun base at Penang. These three aircraft formed the East Asia Naval Special Service to assist Gruppe Monsun as well as local Japanese naval operations.

Following the Surrender of Japan, the IJN ceased all use of the type, individual abandoned aircraft were obtained by numerous other nations. In November 1946, a pair of E13A that were left behind at Morokrembangan Naval Air Base were loaded on the Dutch escort carrier HNLMS Karel Doorman, and transported to the Netherlands, where they were showcased to the Dutch public.

At least eight examples were operated by the French Navy Air Force during the First Indochina War between 1945 and 1947. Other E13As were believed to be operated by the Naval Air Arm of the Royal Thai Navy beforehand. One example (MSN 4326) was surrendered to New Zealand forces after the end of hostilities, and it was flown briefly by the Royal New Zealand Air Force, but not repaired after a float was damaged, and subsequently sank at its moorings in Jacquinot Bay.

== Variants ==
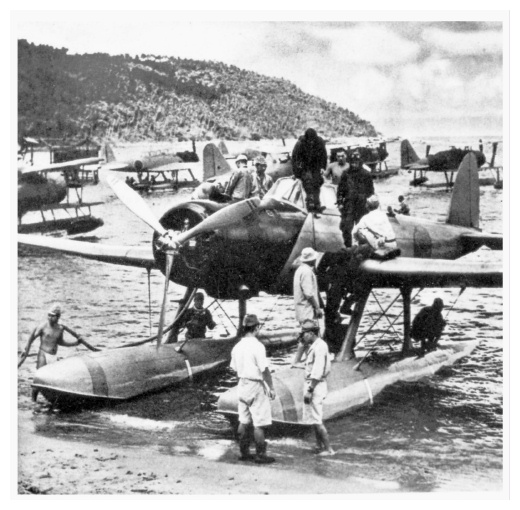
An E13A, probably from Kamikawa Maru's air unit, possibly photographed at Deboyne Islands during the Battle of the Coral Sea.

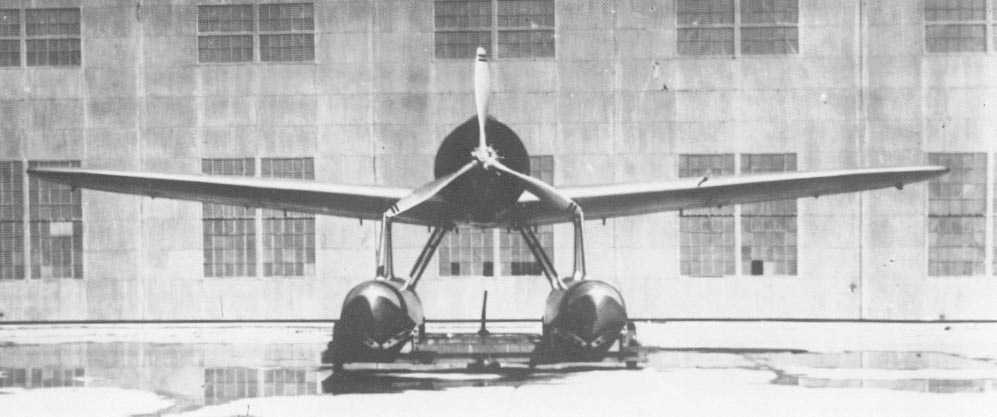
Head-on view of an E13A

E13A1

Prototypes and first production model, later designated Model 11.

E13A1-K

Trainer version with dual controls

E13A1a

Redesigned floats, improved radio equipment

E13A1a-S

Night-flying conversion

E13A1b

As E13A1a, with Air-Surface radar

E13A1b-S

Night-flying conversion of above

E13A1c

Anti-surface vessel version equipped with two downward-firing belly-mounted 20 mm Type 99 Mark II cannons in addition to bombs or depth charges

=== Production ===
- Constructed by Aichi Tokei Denki KK:133
- Constructed by Watanabe (Kyushu Hikoki KK):1,237
- Constructed by Dai-Juichi Kaigun Kokusho: 48

== Operators ==
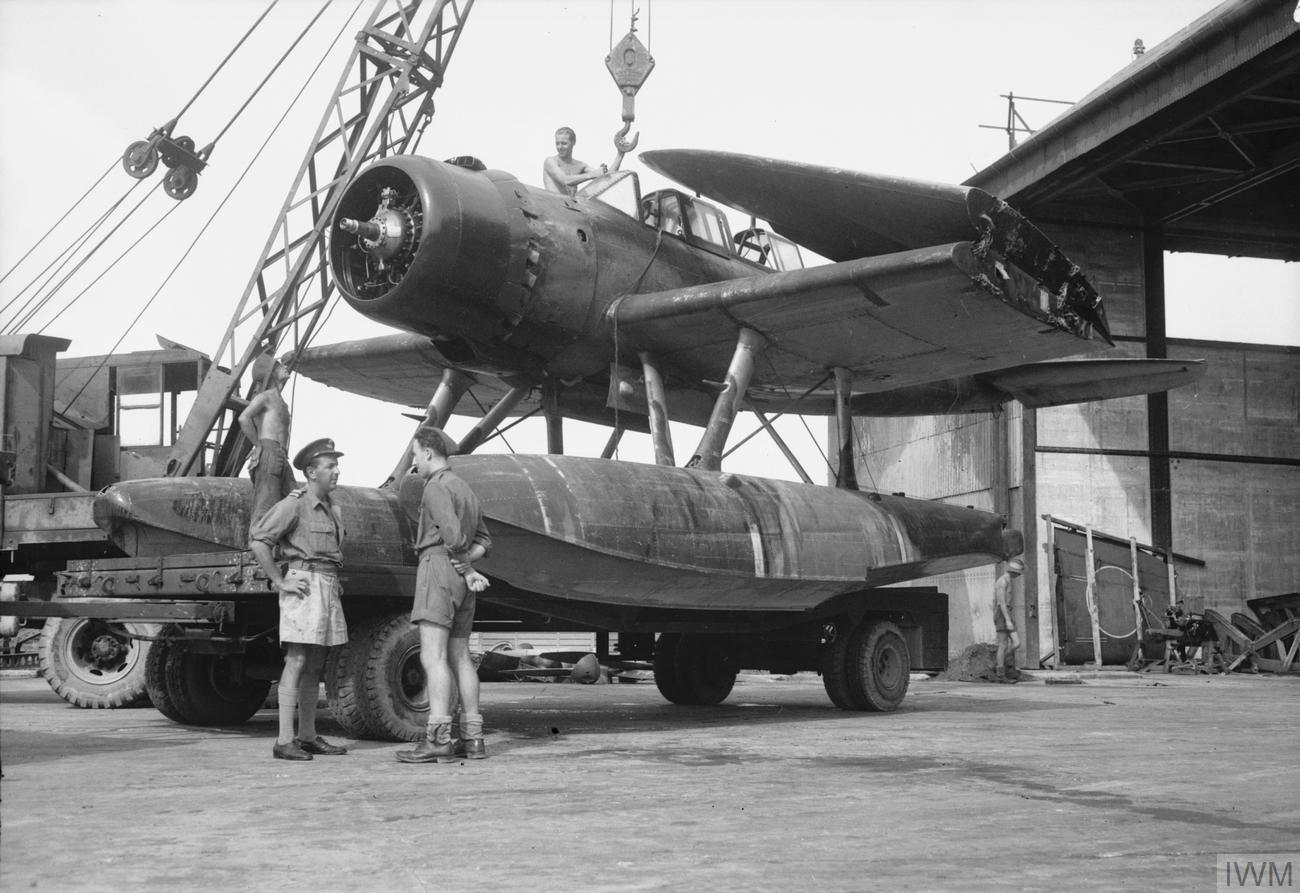
Captured E13A at RAF Seletar, Singapore, circa 1945

France

- French Navy
  - Aeronavale
- French Air Force - Captured Japanese aircraft.

Japan

- Imperial Japanese Navy
  - Imperial Japanese Navy Air Service

Nazi Germany

- Kriegsmarine

Thailand

- Royal Thai Navy

China

- People's Liberation Army Air Force - surplus or derelict Japanese aircraft

== Surviving aircraft ==
The wrecks of a number of sunken aircraft are recorded. The wreckage of one aircraft is located on-land at an abandoned seaplane base at Lenger Island, off Pohnpei in the Federated States of Micronesia.

One E13A was raised from where it sank and is displayed at Gifu Air Field, Kakamigahara, Gifu, Japan. However, it is reportedly in poor condition, lacking its engine, tail, floats and one wing.

Another Aichi, a model E13A1 (MSN 4116) was raised from the sea in 1992, close to Minamisatsuma (called Kaseda at the time), and is now on display at the Bansei Tokkō Peace Museum.

== Specifications (E13A1) ==
Aichi E13A1 drawing

Data from Japanese Aircraft of the Pacific War

General characteristics

- Crew: 3
- Length: 11.3 m (37 ft 1 in)
- Wingspan: 14.5 m (47 ft 7 in)
- Height: 4.7 m (15 ft 5 in)
- Wing area: 36 m^{2} (390 sq ft)
- Empty weight: 2,642 kg (5,825 lb)
- Gross weight: 3,640 kg (8,025 lb)
- Max takeoff weight: 4,000 kg (8,818 lb)
- Powerplant: 1 × Mitsubishi MK8 Kinsei 43 14-cylinder air-cooled radial piston engine, 790 kW (1,060 hp) for take-off

810 kW (1,080 hp) at 2,000 m (6,600 ft)

- Propellers: 3-bladed metal propeller

Performance

- Maximum speed: 376 km/h (234 mph, 203 kn) at 2,180 m (7,150 ft)
- Cruise speed: 222 km/h (138 mph, 120 kn) at 2,000 m (6,600 ft)
- Range: 2,089 km (1,298 mi, 1,128 nmi)
- Endurance: 14+ hours
- Service ceiling: 8,730 m (28,640 ft)
- Time to altitude: 3,000 m (9,800 ft) in six minutes and five seconds
- Wing loading: 101.1 kg/m^{2} (20.7 lb/sq ft)
- Power/mass: 0.2163 kW/kg (0.1316 hp/lb)

Armament

- Guns: 1 × flexible, rearward-firing 7.7 mm (.303 in) Type 92 machine gun for observer

Some aircraft fitted 2 × 20 mm Type 99-2 cannon in a downwards firing position in the belly

- Bombs: 250 kg (550 lb) of bombs

== See also ==
Aircraft of comparable role, configuration, and era

- Arado Ar 196
- Aichi E16A
- Curtiss SOC Seagull
- Kawanishi E15K
- Northrop N-3PB
- Vought OS2U Kingfisher
- Yokosuka E14Y

Related lists

- List of aircraft of World War II
