= Aichi E8A =

Prototype Japanese reconnaissance floatplane

E8A
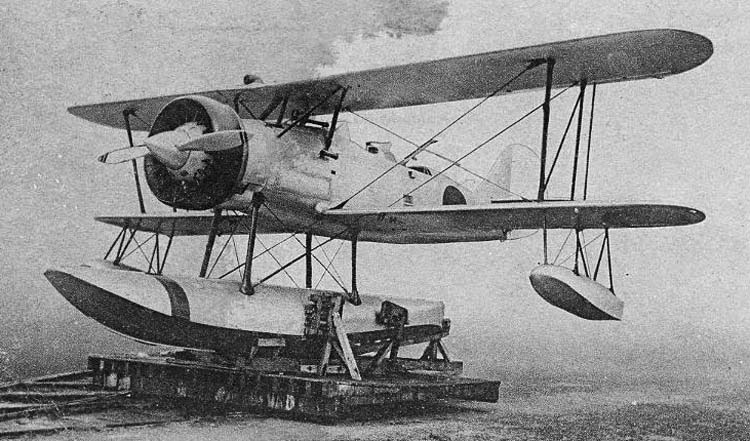

General information
- Type: Reconnaissance floatplane
- National origin: Japan
- Manufacturer: Aichi
- Status: Prototype
- Number built: 2

The Aichi E8A (also designated Experimental 8-Shi Reconnaissance Seaplane or Aichi AB-7) was a prototype Japanese reconnaissance floatplane of the 1930s. It was a two-seat single engined biplane built for the Imperial Japanese Navy. Only two were built.

== Design and development ==
In 1933, the Imperial Japanese Navy issued a specification for a replacement for the Nakajima E4N shipboard reconnaissance floatplane. Aichi prepared two designs, the AM-7, a low-winged monoplane powered by a Bristol Mercury radial engine and the AB-7, a more conventional biplane, powered by a license-built Bristol Jupiter engine. The monoplane design was soon abandoned as its promised performance was little better than that of the aircraft it was meant to replace, but two examples of the AB-7 were built as the Experimental 8-Shi Reconnaissance Seaplane,^{[a]} or E8A under the Short System designation system.

The AB-7 was a single-bay biplane of wood and metal construction, fitted with a single main float that could be replaced be a wheeled undercarriage for operations from land. Its wings folded to the rear to allow easier storage aboard ship. The pilot sat in an open cockpit while the observer's cockpit was part-enclosed to protect him from the environment. The Aichi design was evaluated against competing aircraft from Kawanishi, the E8K, a low-winged monoplane similar to the Aichi AM-7, and Nakajima, the biplane E8N. While the E8A had similar performance to the E8N, the Nakajima biplane had superior maneuverability and handling, and was preferred to both the Nakajima and Kawanishi offerings, with over 700 E8Ns built.

== Specifications ==
Data from Japanese Aircraft 1910–1941

General characteristics

- Crew: 2
- Length: 8.85 m (29 ft 0 in)
- Wingspan: 10.50 m (34 ft 5 in)
- Height: 3.57 m (11 ft 9 in)
- Powerplant: 1 × Nakajima Kotobuki 2-kai 1 9-cylinder air-cooled radial engine, 430 kW (580 hp)

Armament

- Guns: 1 × fixed forward firing 7.7 mm machine gun and 1× flexibly mounted machine gun in observers cockpit

== Notes ==
- ^{a} In the Japanese Navy designation system, specifications were given a Shi number based on the year of the Emperor's reign it was issued. In this case 7-Shi stood for 1932, the 7th year of the Shōwa era.
