= Aichi S1A Denkō =

Japanese night fighter prototype

S1A Denkō
- Wooden mock-up of the Denkō being built.

General information
- Type: Night fighter
- National origin: Japan
- Manufacturer: Aichi Kokuki KK
- Primary user: Imperial Japanese Navy Air Service
- Number built: 2 prototypes (incomplete)

The Aichi S1A Denkō (電光; Bolt of Light) was a Japanese night fighter, intended to replace the Nakajima J1N1-S Gekkō. Like the Gekkō, it was to be equipped with radar to counter the B-29 air raids over Japan. Development time for the S1A increased while trying to overcome design shortcomings, such as the insufficient power of the Navy's requested Nakajima Homare engines, resulting in no aircraft being completed before the war ended.

== Design and development ==
The Denkō's service weight exceeded ten-thousand kilograms because the aircraft was full of special equipment, including oxygen injection, but the turbocharger's remote location from the engine caused many problems. Because the initial prototypes' engines did not pass Navy standards, only two aircraft were ever manufactured. Two more had been planned before cancellation that would have used the more powerful Mitsubishi HI MK9A Ru or MK10A Ru engines.

Additionally, the Tōnankai earthquake occurred in December 1944 with the aircraft factories and prototypes badly damaged as a result. On 9 June 1945, the airstrikes on Aichi Kokuki and Aichi Tokei Denki Seizo Co., Ltd blew up the S1A first prototype and forced movement of the second to the Gifu large Sadakazu factory to be assembled, but, on 9 July, another airstrike destroyed the second prototype. To date, the Aichi S1A is still the most massive fighter developed in Japan's naval history.

== Specifications (S1A1 Denkō) ==
Data from Japanese Aircraft of the pacific War

General characteristics

- Crew: 2
- Length: 49 ft 6.5 in (15.1 m)
- Wingspan: 57 ft 5 in (17.5 m)
- Height: 15 ft 1.5 in (4.61 m)
- Wing area: 505.902 sq ft (47.0 m^{2})
- Empty weight: 16,138 lb (7,320 kg)
- Gross weight: 22,443 lb (10,180 kg)
- Max takeoff weight: 25,375 lb (11,510 kg)
- Powerplant: 2 × Nakajima NK9K-S , 2,000 hp (1,500 kW) each at take-off
- Propellers: 4-bladed

Performance

- Maximum speed: 360 mph (580 km/h, 318 kn)
- Cruise speed: 273 mph (440 km/h, 240 kn)
- Range: 1,054 mi (1,697 km, 916 nmi)
- Ferry range: 1,553 mi (2,500 km, 1,373 nmi)
- Service ceiling: 39,370 ft (12,000 m)
- Wing loading: 44.4 lb/sq ft (126.6 kg/m^{2})

Armament

- Guns:
- 2× fuselage-mounted forward-firing 30mm Type 5 cannon
- 2× fuselage-mounted forward-firing 20mm Type 99 model 1 cannon
- 2× dorsal turret-mounted 20mm Type 99 model 2 cannon

== See also ==
Aircraft of comparable role, configuration, and era

- Heinkel He 219
- Kawasaki Ki-102
- Mitsubishi Ki-83
- Northrop P-61 Black Widow
