= Aichi H9A =

Japanese flying boat trainer

H9A
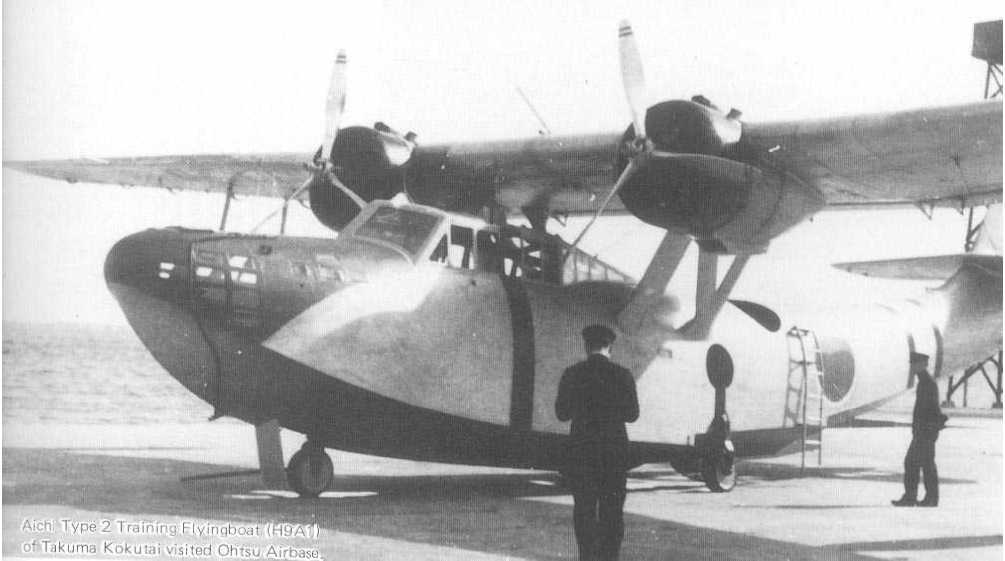
- Aichi H9A1 Navy Type 2 Training Flying Boat

General information
- Type: Flying boat trainer
- Manufacturer: Aichi
- Primary user: Imperial Japanese Navy Air Service
- Number built: 31

History
- Introduction date: 1942
- First flight: September 1940
- Retired: 1945

The Aichi H9A was a flying boat trainer designed and produced by the Japanese aircraft manufacturer Aichi. It was operated by the Imperial Japanese Navy Air Service (IJAAS) during World War II for crew training, receiving the designation "Type 2 Training Flying Boat" (二式練習飛行艇, Ni-shiki renshū hikō-tei). Being an relatively uncommon type, it was not encountered by Allied forces until Spring 1945 and thus was never assigned an Allied reporting name.

The H9A a twin-engined parasol-wing flying boat that was designed to fulfil an Imperial Japanese Navy (IJN) instruction to produce a twin-engined flying boat to perform the training role. To this end, Aichi designed it to be operated by a crew of five along with three trainees; it could also carry both depth charges and defensive machine guns for its secondary use as a maritime patrol aircraft. The prototype performed its maiden flight in September 1940, only nine months after design work had commenced; however, the type initially showed undesirable handling characteristics, thus modifications were made to the wing, flaps, and engine mounting to successfully improve the flying boat's behaviour during both flight and alighting. Approved for production, the first H9As were delivered to the service during 1942. While most of the type were manufactured by Aichi, a small number were built by Nakajima Hikoki KK as well. Exclusively operated by the IJAAS, the H9A was deployed to perform anti-submarine patrols, paratroop training, transport and liaison duties.

== Design and development ==
The H9A was developed in response to the issuing of a Imperial Japanese Navy (IJN) an instruction to Aichi for it to provide a twin-engined flying boat configured for the training of future crew members of the four-engined Kawanishi H8K "Emily" maritime patrol flying boat. Accordingly, the company commenced design work in January 1940; its design team produced a twin-engined parasol-wing flying boat that was internally designated as the AM-21. While it was designed to be typically operated by a crew of five (consisting of a pilot, co-pilot, observer, flight engineer, and radio-operator), sufficient seating was provided for an additional three trainees to be present as well. To perform its secondary role of anti-submarine patrol, as well as to conduct armament training flights, provision was made for the installation of a flexibly-mounted 7.7 mm machine gun in the open positions at both the bow and stern in addition to the external carriage of two 250 kg depth charges.

The H9A featured an all-metal structure, the covering of which comprised a combination of fabric, plywood, and light alloys. While the prototypes were fitted with twin-bladed propellers, the production flying boats differed by using three-bladed propellers instead. The H9A was furnished with a semi-retractable tricycle beaching gear.

In September 1940, the first of three prototypes conducted its maiden flight. Initial test flights discovered undesirable behaviours in both alighting and flying alike; remedial measures included mounting the engines in a lower position relative to the wings, modifications to the flaps, and the expansion of both the wing area and wing span. As a result of these changes, later flights demonstrated noticeable handling improvements, which contributed to the type being put into limited production as the Type 2 Training Flying Boat. The first eleven flying boats were delivered to the IJN during 1942. While production of the type was principally performed by Aichi, at least four H9As were produced by another Japanese aircraft manufacturer, Nakajima Hikoki KK, as well.

== Operational history ==
Between May 1942 and June 1942, the Imperial Japanese Navy Air Service (IJAAS) employed its H9As in a variety of second-line roles, including anti-submarine missions along the Japanese coastline, transport, paratroop training, and liaison missions.

== Variants ==
H9A Prototypes
three aircraft built by Aichi.
H9A1
Serial version, 24 aircraft built by Aichi and an additional four by Nippon Hikoki.

== Operators ==
Japan

- Imperial Japanese Navy Air Service

== Specifications (H9A1) ==
Data from Japanese Aircraft of the Pacific War, Warplanes of the Second World War, Volume Five: Flying Boats

General characteristics

- Crew: five
- Capacity: three pupils
- Length: 16.95 m (55 ft 7 in)
- Wingspan: 24 m (78 ft 9 in)
- Height: 5.25 m (17 ft 3 in)
- Wing area: 63.3 m^{2} (681 sq ft)
- Empty weight: 4,900 kg (10,803 lb)
- Gross weight: 7,000 kg (15,432 lb)
- Max takeoff weight: 7,500 kg (16,535 lb)
- Powerplant: 2 × Nakajima Ha-1 Kotobuki 42 or 43 nine-cylinder air-cooled radial piston engine, 530 kW (710 hp) each for take-off

450 kW (610 hp) at 3,000 m (9,800 ft)

- Propellers: 3-bladed propellers

Performance

- Maximum speed: 317 km/h (197 mph, 171 kn) at 3,000 m (9,800 ft)
- Cruise speed: 222 km/h (138 mph, 120 kn) at 1,000 m (3,300 ft)
- Range: 2,148 km (1,335 mi, 1,160 nmi)
- Service ceiling: 6,780 m (22,240 ft)
- Rate of climb: 4.5 m/s (890 ft/min)
- Time to altitude: 3,000 m (9,800 ft) in 11 minutes and 14 seconds
- Wing loading: 110.6 kg/m^{2} (22.7 lb/sq ft)
- Power/mass: 0.151 kW/kg (0.092 hp/lb)

Armament

- Guns: 1× flexible, 7.7 mm (.303 in) Type 92 machine gun in bow and dorsal hatches
- Bombs: 2× 250 kg (551 lb) bombs or depth charges

== See also ==
Aircraft of comparable role, configuration, and era

- Consolidated PBY Catalina
- Kawanishi H6K
- Short Sunderland

Related lists

- List of aircraft of World War II
- List of flying boats and floatplanes
- List of aircraft of the Japanese Navy
- List of military aircraft of Japan
