= Aichi Experimental Type 15-Ko Reconnaissance Seaplane (Mi-go) =

1920s Japanese reconnaissance seaplane

General information
- Type: Reconnaissance seaplane
- Manufacturer: Aichi Kokuki
- Primary user: Imperial Japanese Navy
- Number built: ~4

History
- First flight: 1925

The Aichi Experimental Type 15-Ko Reconnaissance Seaplane (Mi-go) was a prototype reconnaissance seaplane built by Aichi in the mid-1920s.

== Design and development ==
The Mi-Go was built in response to an Imperial Japanese Navy (IJN) requirement for a reconnaissance seaplane to replace the Hansa-Brandenburg W.33 in IJN service. The W.33 had been acquired by the IJN in 1922 but was unpopular with crews due to poor handling and limited visibility afloat. The Mi-Go differed from the W.33 in having floats connected to the wings, a wooden airframe, fabric covered wings, and much lighter weight. Four prototypes of the Mi-Go were built; tests of which showed it to be longitudinally unstable in flight, although the first prototype used Dornier bench-type aileron balances, and the IJN selected the rival Nakajima Type 15 Reconnaissance Seaplane (E2N) for production instead.

== Operators ==
Japan

- Imperial Japanese Navy

== Specifications ==
Data from Japanese Aircraft, 1910-1941, airwar.ru

General characteristics

- Crew: 2
- Length: 9.485 m (31 ft 1 in)
- Wingspan: 13.63 m (44 ft 9 in)
- Height: 3.28 m (10 ft 9 in)
- Empty weight: 1,200 kg (2,646 lb)
- Gross weight: 1,700 kg (3,748 lb)
- Max takeoff weight: 1,700 kg (3,748 lb)
- Powerplant: 1 × Mitsubishi Type Hi (Hispano ) V-8 water-cooled piston engine, 220 kW (300 hp)
- Propellers: 2-bladed wooden fixed-pitch propeller

Performance

- Maximum speed: 180 km/h (112 mph, 97 kn) at sea level
- Cruise speed: 160 km/h (99 mph, 86 kn)
- Stall speed: 84 km/h (52 mph, 45 kn)
- Service ceiling: 4,800 m (15,700 ft)
- Time to altitude: 3,000 m (9,800 ft) in 18 minutes 19 seconds
- Wing loading: 25.4 kg/m^{2} (5.2 lb/sq ft)
- Power/mass: 7.6 kg/kW (12.5 lb/hp)

Armament

- Guns: 1 × flexible 7.7 mm (0.303 in) machine gun
