= Japanese battleship Haruna =

Japanese Kongō-class battlecruiser

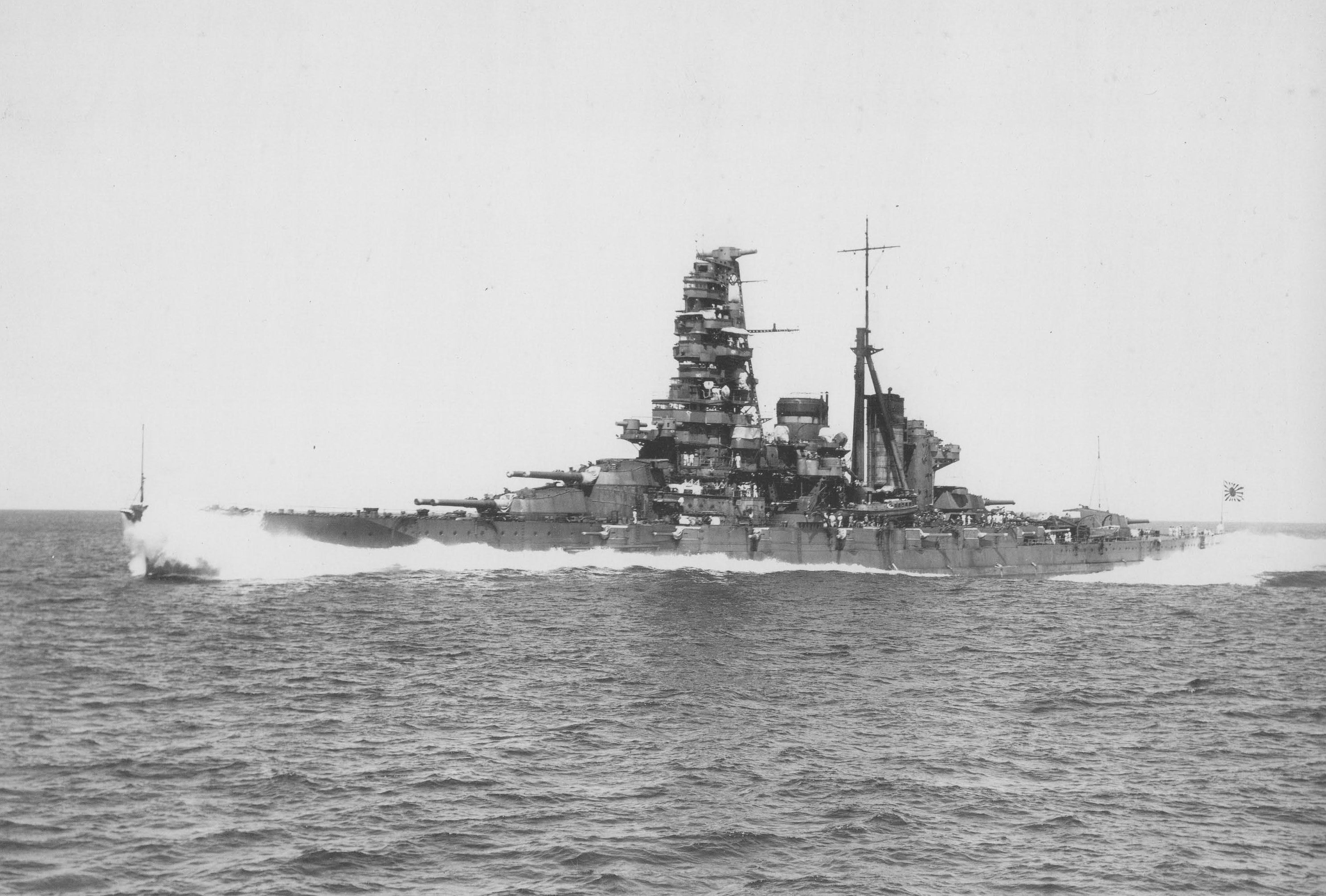
- Haruna in 1934, following her second reconstruction

History

Empire of Japan
- Name: Haruna
- Namesake: Mount Haruna
- Ordered: 1911
- Builder: Kawasaki Shipyards
- Laid down: 16 March 1912
- Launched: 14 December 1913
- Commissioned: 19 April 1915
- Fate: Sunk at her moorings on 28 July 1945; raised and scrapped in 1946

General characteristics
- Class & type: Kongō-class battlecruiser
- Displacement: 36,600 long tons (37,187 t)
- Length: 222 m (728 ft 4 in)
- Beam: 31 m (101 ft 8 in)
- Draft: 9.7 m (31 ft 10 in)
- Installed power: 64,000 shp (48,000 kW)
- Propulsion: 4 × Brown-Curtis turbines; 4 × shafts
- Speed: 1915–1934: 26 kn (48 km/h; 30 mph); 1934–1945: 30.5 kn (56.5 km/h; 35.1 mph)
- Complement: 1,360
- Armament: 1915: 8 × 356 mm (14 in) guns (4×2); 16 × 152 mm (6 in) guns (16×1); 8 × 76 mm (3 in) guns (8×1); 8 × 530 mm (21 in) torpedo tubes (submerged); 1945: 8 × 356 mm (14 in) (4×2); 8 × 152 mm (6 in) guns (8×1); 12 × 127 mm (5 in)/40 guns (6×2); 108 × 25 mm (0.98 in) Type 96 AA guns
- Armor: Turrets: 9 in (230 mm); Belt: 8 in (200 mm); Deck: 1.5 in (38 mm)–2.75 in (70 mm)
- Aircraft carried: 3 × reconnaissance floatplanes
- Notes: Unless otherwise noted, all statistics apply to after the second reconstruction.

Haruna (Japanese: 榛名; named after Mount Haruna) was a warship of the Imperial Japanese Navy during World War I and World War II. Designed by the British naval engineer George Thurston, she was the fourth and last battlecruiser of the Kongō class, amongst the most heavily armed ships of their type in any navy when built. Laid down in 1912 at the Kawasaki Shipyards in Kobe, Haruna was formally commissioned in 1915 on the same day as her sister ship, Kirishima.

Haruna patrolled off the Chinese coast during World War I. During gunnery drills in 1920, an explosion destroyed one of her guns, damaged the gun turret, and killed seven men. During her career, Haruna underwent two major reconstructions. Beginning in 1926, the Imperial Japanese Navy rebuilt her as a battleship, strengthening her armor and improving her speed and power capabilities. In 1933, her superstructure was completely rebuilt, her speed was increased, and she was equipped with launch catapults for floatplanes. Now fast enough to accompany Japan's growing carrier fleet, Haruna was reclassified as a fast battleship. During the Second Sino-Japanese War, Haruna transported Imperial Japanese Army troops to mainland China before being redeployed to the 3rd Battleship Division in 1941. On the eve of the Japanese attack on Pearl Harbor, she sailed as part of the Southern Force in preparation for the Battle of Singapore.

Haruna fought in almost every major naval action of the Pacific Theater during World War II. She covered the Japanese landings in Malaya (in present-day Malaysia), the Dutch East Indies (now Indonesia), and the Indian Ocean raid in 1942. She then engaged American forces, first at the Battle of Midway where she repelled several torpedo bombers, and during the Guadalcanal campaign when she bombarded Henderson Field. Throughout 1943, Haruna primarily remained at Truk Lagoon (Micronesia), Kure Naval Base (near Hiroshima), Sasebo Naval Base (near Nagasaki), and the Lingga Islands (in present-day Indonesia), and deployed on several occasions in response to American carrier airstrikes on Japanese island bases. Haruna participated in the Battle of the Philippine Sea and the Battle of Leyte Gulf in 1944, engaging American vessels in the latter.

In 1945, Haruna was transferred to Kure Naval Base, where she was sunk by aircraft of Task Force 38 on 28 July 1945.

== Design and construction ==
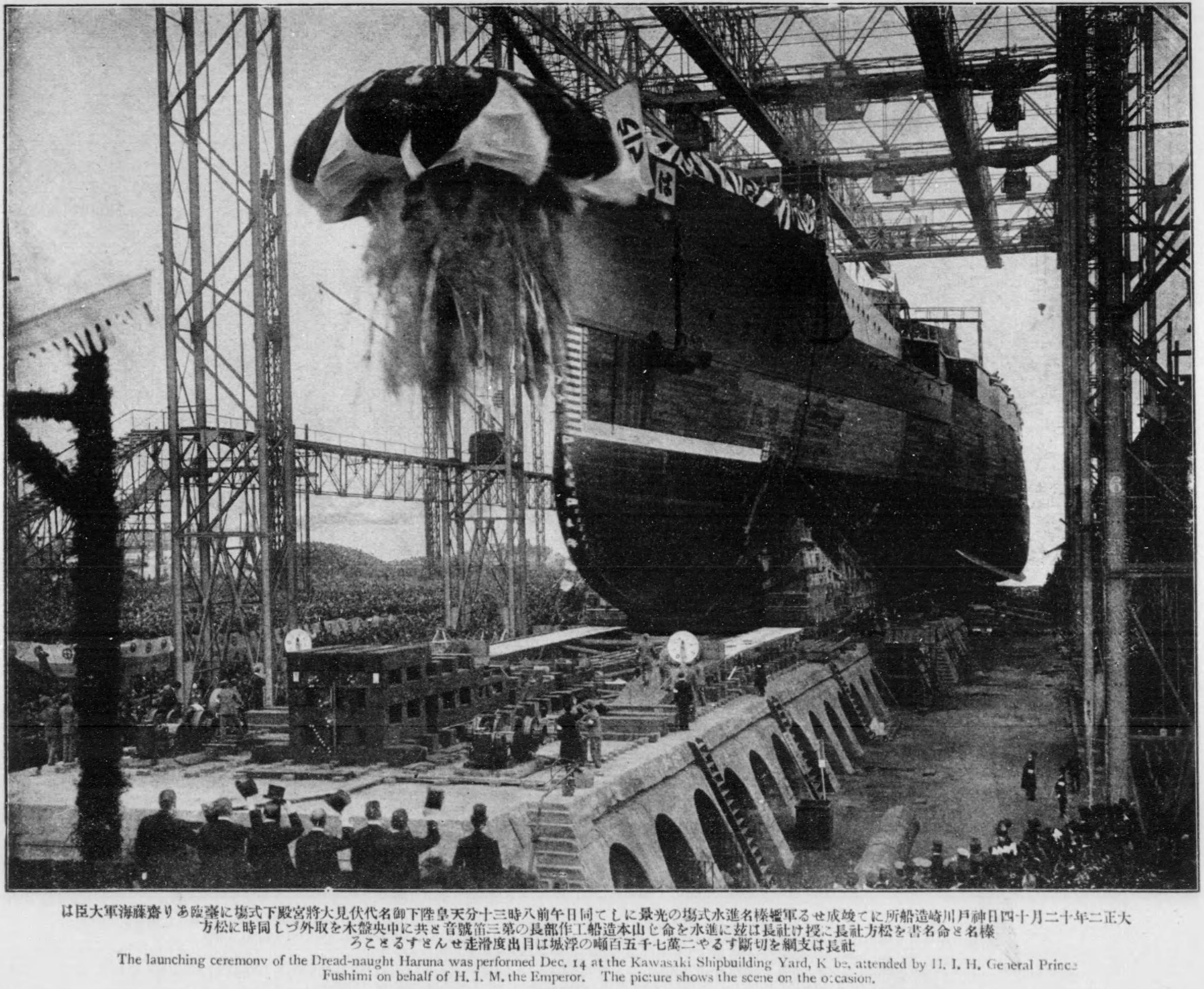
Launch of Haruna, 14 December 1913

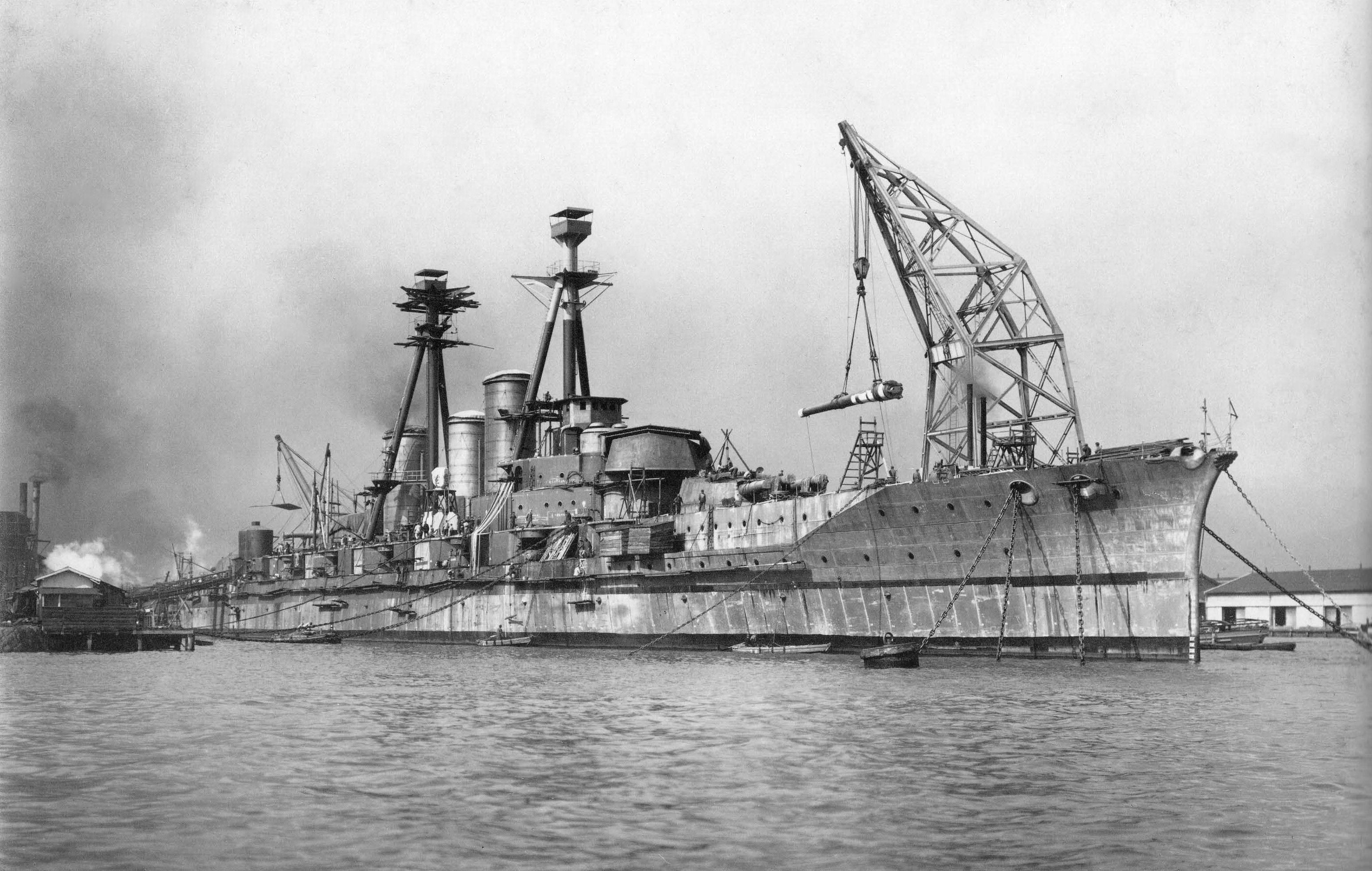
The fitting out of Haruna in Kôbe, October 1914

Haruna was the fourth and last of the Imperial Japanese Navy's Kongō-class battlecruisers, a line of capital ships designed by the British naval engineer George Thurston. The class was ordered in 1910 in the Japanese Emergency Naval Expansion Bill after the commissioning of HMS Invincible in 1908. The four battlecruisers of the Kongō class were designed to match the naval capabilities of the other major powers at the time; they have been called the battlecruiser versions of the British (formerly Turkish) battleship HMS Erin. Their heavy armament and armor protection (which contributed 23.3 percent of their displacement) were greatly superior to those of any other Japanese capital ship afloat at the time.

The keel of Haruna was laid down at Kobe by Kawasaki on 16 March 1912, with most of the parts used in her construction manufactured in Japan. Due to a shortage of available slipways, Haruna and her sister ship Kirishima were the first two capital ships of the Imperial Japanese Navy to be built in private shipyards. Launched on 14 December 1913, Haruna's fitting-out began in early 1914. She was completed on 19 April 1915.

=== Armament ===
Haruna's main battery consisted of eight 14 in (36 cm) heavy-caliber main guns in four twin turrets (two forward, two aft). The turrets were noted by the U.S. Office of Naval Intelligence to be "similar to the British 15-inch turrets", with improvements made in flash-tightness. Each of her main guns could fire high-explosive or armor-piercing shells a maximum of 38,770 yd (19.14 nmi; 35.45 km) at a firing rate of two shells per minute. In keeping with the Japanese doctrine of deploying more powerful vessels before their opponents, Haruna and her sister ships were the first vessels in the world equipped with 14 in (36 cm) guns. The main guns carried ammunition for 90 salvoes, and had an approximate barrel life of 250 to 280 rounds. In 1941, separate dyes (used to distinguish between shells fired from multiple ships) were introduced for the armor-piercing shells of the four Kongō-class battleships, with Haruna's armor-piercing shells using black dye.

Her secondary battery was originally sixteen 6 in (15 cm) 50-caliber medium guns in single casemates (all located amidships), eight 3 in (7.6 cm) guns and eight submerged 21 in (53 cm) torpedo tubes. The six-inch guns could fire five to six rounds per minute, with a barrel life of 500 rounds. The 6"/50 caliber gun was capable of firing both anti-aircraft and anti-ship shells, though the positioning of the guns on Haruna made antiaircraft firing impractical. During her second reconstruction, the older 3-inch guns were removed and replaced with eight 5 in (13 cm) dual-purpose guns. These 5"/40 caliber guns could fire between 8 and 14 rounds per minute, with a barrel life of 800 to 1,500 rounds. The 5"/40 had the widest variety of shot types of Haruna's guns, being designed to fire antiaircraft, antiship, and illumination shells. She was also armed with a large number of 1 in (2.5 cm) antiaircraft machine guns. In 1943, her secondary armament was reconfigured to eight 6 in (15 cm) guns, twelve 5 in (13 cm) guns, and finally by the end of 1944 one hundred and eight Type 96 antiaircraft autocannon in 30 triple and 18 single mounts.

== Operational history ==
=== 1915–1926: Battlecruiser ===
On 19 April 1915, Haruna was formally commissioned at Kobe. On 13 December 1915, after eight months of trials, she was assigned to the 3rd Battleship Division of the 2nd Fleet. On 9 April 1916, she departed Sasebo Naval Base for operations in the East China Sea, returning to Japan 10 days later. On 1 December 1916, Captain Saburo Hyakutake assumed command of Haruna until 15 September 1917, when Captain Naomi Taniguchi replaced him. On 1 December 1917, she was placed in reserve, as hostilities in the Pacific theatre of World War I concluded.

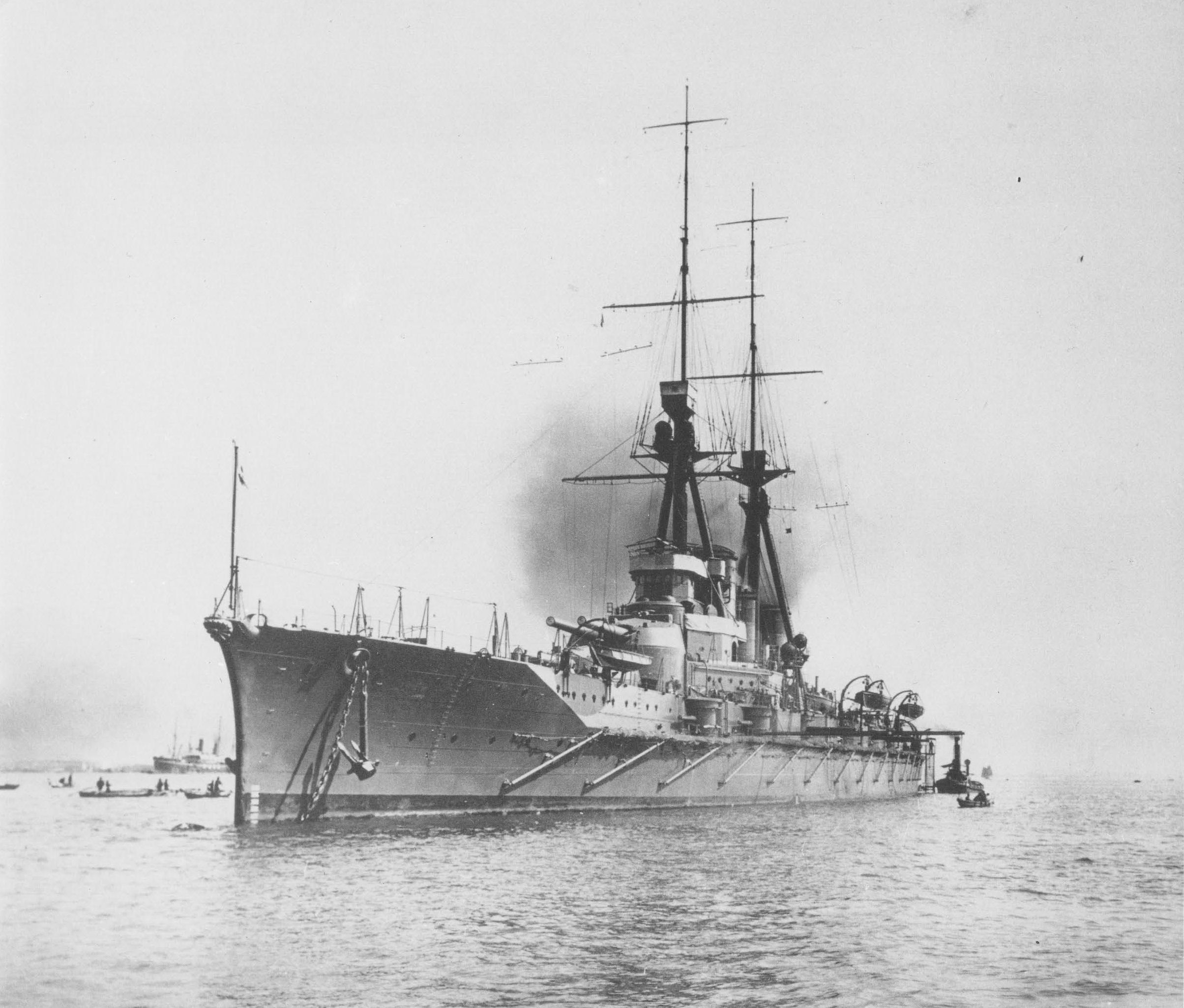
Haruna at Kōbe on 24 April 1915

On 12 September 1920, Haruna was involved in gunnery drills off Hokkaidō when a breech explosion destroyed the starboard gun of the No. 1 turret, killing seven men and badly damaging the armored roof of the turret. A later investigation by the Imperial Japanese Navy concluded that a faulty fuse ignited the gunpowder bags in the breech, detonating the shell while still in the barrel. The turret was repaired at Yokosuka Naval Arsenal, where the elevation of her 14-inch guns was also increased by seven degrees. Three months later, she was once again placed in reserve.

With the conclusion of World War I and the signing of the Washington Naval Treaty, the size of the Imperial Japanese Navy was significantly lessened, with a ratio of 5:5:3 required between the capital ships of the United Kingdom, the United States, and Japan. The treaty also banned Japan from building any new capital ships until 1931, with no capital ship permitted to exceed 35,000 long tons (35,562 t). Provided that new additions did not exceed 3,000 long tons (3,048 t), existing capital ships were allowed to be upgraded with improved anti-torpedo bulges and deck armor. By the time the Washington Treaty had been fully implemented in Japan, only three classes of World War I-era capital ships remained active: the Ise-class battleships, the Kongō-class battlecruisers, and one of the Fusō-class battleships (Yamashiro).

=== 1926–1933: Reconstruction into battleship ===
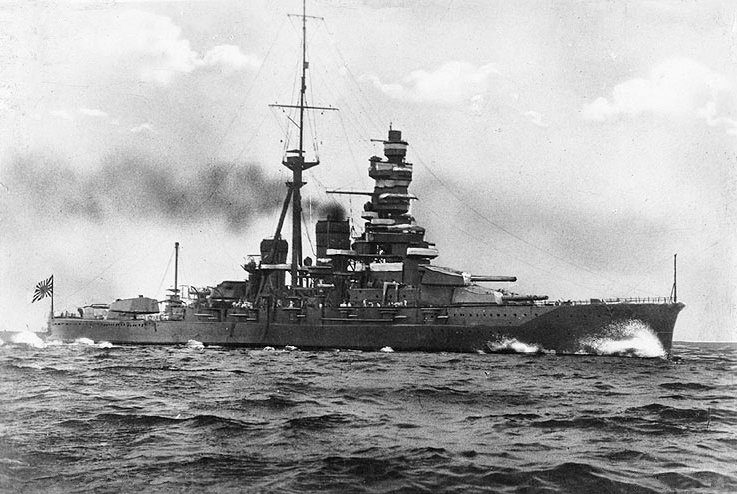
Haruna at sea

Unable to construct new capital ships until 1931, Japan resorted to upgrading battleships and battlecruisers. In July 1926, Haruna became the first of Japan's vessels to undergo extensive modernization and modification, in drydock at Yokosuka Naval Arsenal. Over the next two years, her horizontal armor near her ammunition magazines was strengthened, and the machinery spaces within the hull were increased. Anti-torpedo bulges were added along the waterline, as permitted by the Washington Treaty. She was refitted to accommodate three Type 90 Model 0 floatplanes. To increase her speed and power capacities, all 36 Yarrow boilers were removed and replaced with 16 newer boilers, and Brown-Curtis direct-drive turbines were installed. Haruna's forward funnel was removed, and her second funnel was enlarged and lengthened. The modifications to her hull increased her armor weight from 6,502 to 10,313 long tons, directly violating the terms of the Washington Treaty. In July 1928, Haruna was reclassified as a battleship.

Following new sea trials, Haruna was assigned on 10 December 1928 to the 4th Battleship Division of the 2nd Fleet as the Emperor's special ship. (Note: The Emperor's Special Ship was designated as his official means of naval transport throughout the Japanese Empire.) For the next 12 months, she operated between Sasebo, Port Arthur, and the East China Sea. On 1 February 1929, Prince Takamatsu, the younger brother of Emperor Hirohito, was assigned to the crew. On 20 November 1929, she was reassigned to the 1st Battleship Division. She was placed in reserve on 1 December 1930.

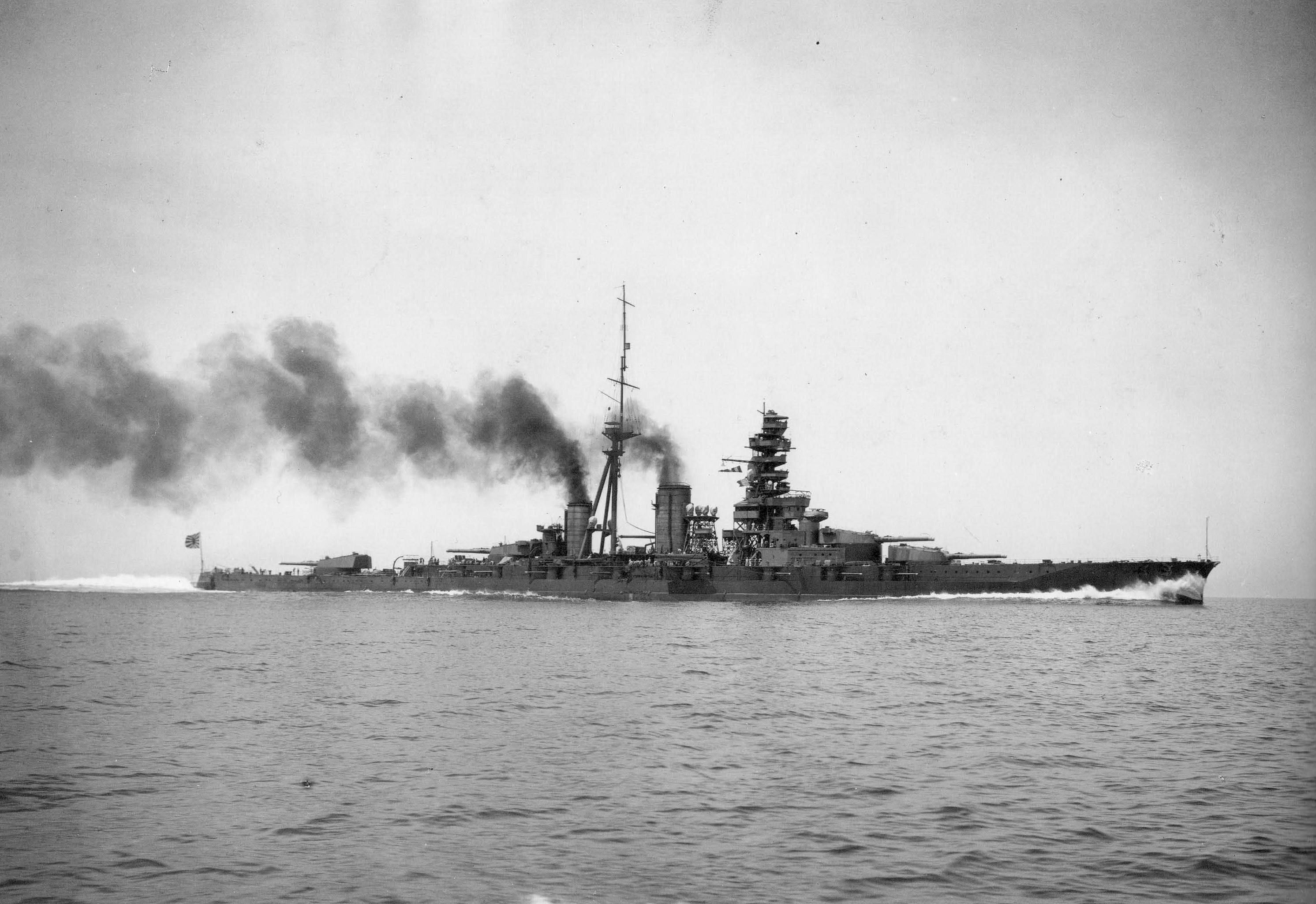
Haruna undergoing trials after her reconstruction in 1928

On 22 April 1930, Japan signed the London Naval Treaty, placing further restrictions on its maritime forces. In addition to the scrapping of several older battleships, Japan would not be permitted to construct new capital ships until 1937. After minor fitting-out work, her reconstruction begun in 1926 was declared complete on 1 October 1931. On 8 November 1931, she served as the Emperor's ship during his official visit to Kumamoto prefecture.

In September 1931, Japan invaded Manchuria. On 25 February 1933, based on the report by the Lytton Commission, the League of Nations agreed that Japan's invasion had violated Chinese sovereignty. Refusing to accept the organization's judgment, Japan withdrew from the League of Nations the same day. By the end of 1934, Japan would also announce that it would withdraw from the Washington and London Naval Treaties, thus removing all restrictions on the number and size of its capital ships.

=== 1933–1941: Fast battleship ===
Haruna was reactivated and assigned to the 1st Battleship Division on 20 May 1933. However, on 1 August 1933, Haruna was drydocked at Kure Naval Arsenal in preparation for upgrades that would enable her to escort Japan's growing fleet of aircraft carriers. Her stern was lengthened by 26 ft (7.9 m), and her bridge was completely reconstructed according to Japan's pagoda mast style of forward superstructure. Her 16 older boilers were removed and replaced with 11 oil-fired Kampon Boilers and newer geared turbines. Catapults and rails were added to support three Nakajima E8N or Kawanishi E7K reconnaissance and spotter floatplanes.

Haruna's armor was also extensively upgraded. Her main belt was strengthened to a uniform thickness of 8 inches (up from varying thicknesses of 6 to 8 inches), while diagonal bulkheads of depths ranging from 5 to 8 in (127 to 203 mm) now reinforced the main armored belt. The turret armor was strengthened to 10 inches (254 mm), while 4 in (102 mm) were added to portions of the deck armor. Her ammunition magazine protection was also strengthened to 4.0 inches (10 cm). The reconstruction was finished on 30 September 1934. Capable of more than 30 kn (56 km/h; 35 mph) despite the significant increase in hull displacement, Haruna was now reclassified as a fast battleship.

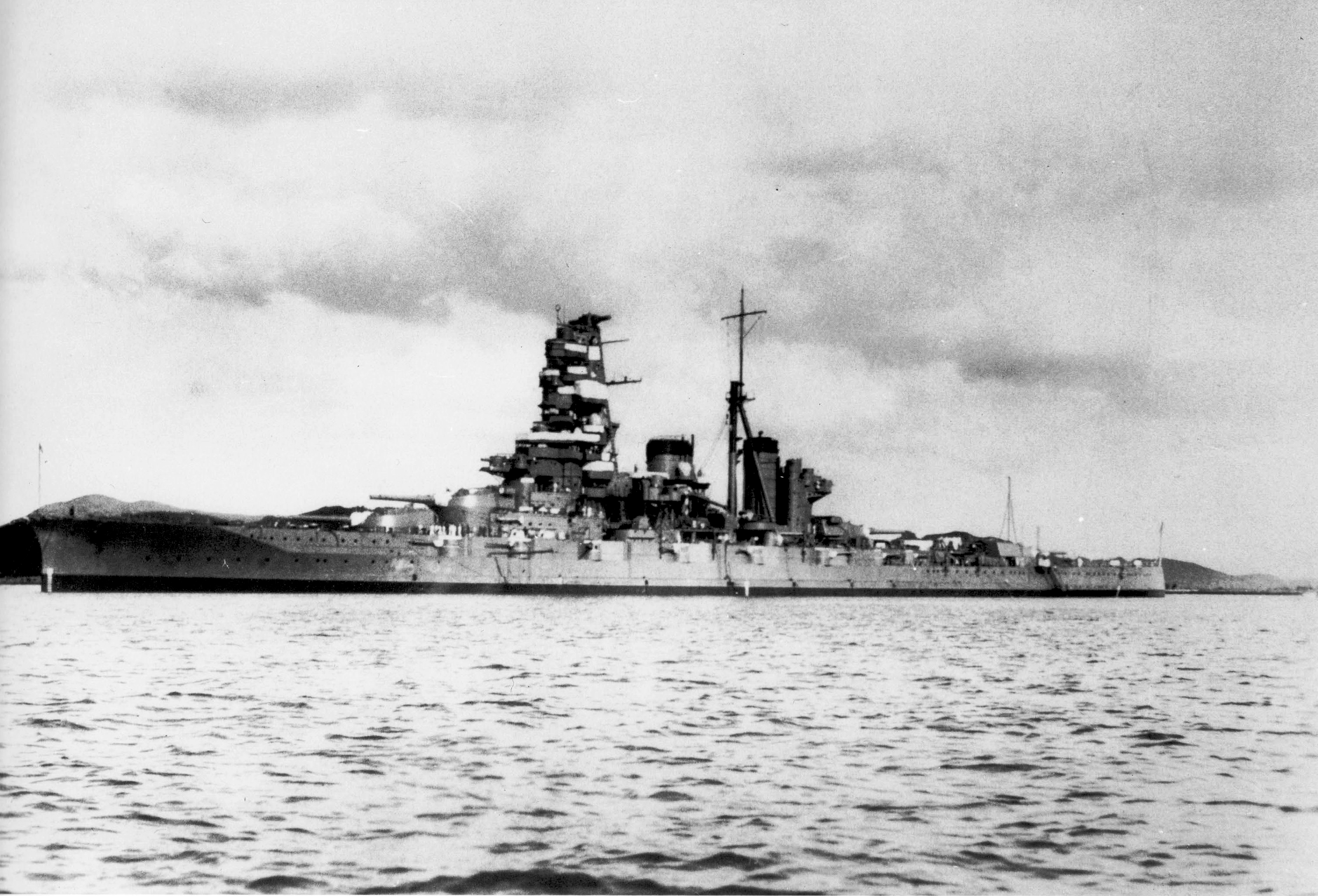
Haruna at Yokosuka in 1935

On 28 October 1935, Captain Jisaburō Ozawa assumed command of Haruna. On 1 June 1936, she was assigned to the 3rd Battleship Division of the 1st Fleet. Throughout 1937, Haruna conducted extensive gunnery drills and patrols off the coast of China, primarily in the vicinity of Qingdao. On 7 July 1937, Japan officially declared war on China, thus beginning the Sino-Japanese War. One month later, Haruna transported Japanese Army forces to mainland China in preparation for campaigns into Chinese Nationalist territory. On 1 December 1937, she was again placed in reserve. On 2 April 1940, she was transferred from Sasebo to Taiwan. She was redesignated as a "special service ship" on 15 November 1940, and five months later was attached to the 3rd Battleship Division of the 1st Fleet, based in Hashirajima.

=== 1941–1942: Early war service ===
Haruna and Kongō departed the Hashirajima fleet anchorage on 29 November 1941, to participate in the opening stage of the Pacific War as part of the Southern (Malay) Force's Main Body, under the overall command of Vice-Admiral Nobutake Kondō. On 4 December 1941, the Main Body arrived off the coast of Southern Siam and Northern Malaya, in preparation for the invasion of Siam and the Malayan Peninsula four days later. When Britain's "Force Z"—consisting of the battleship HMS Prince of Wales and the battlecruiser HMS Repulse—was sunk by IJNAS land-based torpedo bombers, Haruna's battlegroup withdrew from Malayan waters. The battlegroup subsequently sortied from Indochina for three days in mid-December to protect a reinforcement convoy traveling to Malaya and again on 18 December to cover the Army's landing at Lingayen Gulf in the Philippines. The Main Body departed Cam Ranh Bay in French Indochina on 23 December bound for Taiwan, arriving two days later.

On 11 December 1941, an erroneous report was published in the U.S. media that an American B-17 heavy bomber had bombed and mortally damaged Haruna during battle off Lingayen Gulf off the Philippines. No Japanese battleships were present, and Haruna was 1,500 nmi (2,800 km; 1,700 mi) away in the Gulf of Siam at the time.

On 18 January 1942, Kondō's Main Force arrived in Palau alongside two fast carriers, with the intention of covering Japan's invasion of Borneo and the Dutch East Indies. Haruna, Maya, and the fleet carriers Hiryū and Sōryū operated to the east of Mindanao until 18 February 1942, when the Main Body departed Palau in preparation for "Operation J", Japan's invasion of the Dutch East Indies. On 25 February, the 3rd Battleship Division provided cover for air attacks on Java. Haruna bombarded Christmas Island on 7 March 1942, then returned to Staring-baai for 15 days of maintenance and rest. In April 1942, Haruna joined five fleet carriers in attacks on Colombo in Ceylon. Following the destruction of HMS Dorsetshire on 5 April 1942, Haruna was sent southwest to locate the remainder of the British Eastern Fleet, under the command of Admiral James Somerville. On 9 April, one of her floatplanes spotted the carrier HMS Hermes south of Trincomalee; Japanese airstrikes sank the carrier the same day. Having crippled the offensive capability of Britain's Eastern Fleet, the 3rd Battleship Division returned to Japan on 23 April. Haruna was drydocked throughout May 1942 for general repairs and refits.

On 29 May 1942, Haruna joined her sister ship Kirishima as part of Vice-Admiral Chūichi Nagumo's carrier strike force during the Battle of Midway. On 4 June, she was attacked in multiple airstrikes by American torpedo bombers, but she took no hits and succeeded in shooting down five American aircraft. On 5 June, she took on survivors from the four destroyed Japanese aircraft carriers before returning to Japan.

Haruna remained in Japan until September 1942, undergoing minor refits at Kure in August of that year. On 6 September, she transferred to Truk Lagoon alongside the rest of the 3rd Battleship Division, and on 10 September the ship sortied as part of Admiral Kondō's 2nd Fleet into the Solomon Islands. On 20 September, the fleet was ordered to return to Truk.

==== Bombardment of Henderson Field ====
In the aftermath of the Battle of Cape Esperance, the Japanese Army opted to reinforce their positions on Guadalcanal. To protect their transport convoy from enemy air attack, Admiral Yamamoto sent Haruna and Kongō, escorted by one light cruiser and nine destroyers, to bombard Henderson Field. Because of their high speed, the two battleships could bombard the field and withdraw before being subjected to air attack from aircraft carriers. On the night of 13–14 October, the two battleships shelled Henderson Field from a distance of 16,000 yards (15,000 m), firing 973 14-inch shells. In the most successful Japanese battleship action of the war, the bombardment heavily damaged both runways, destroyed almost all available aviation fuel, incapacitated 48 of the airfield's 90 aircraft, and killed 41 men. The Japanese troop convoy reached the island the next day.

During the Battle of the Santa Cruz Islands on 26 October 1942, Haruna was attacked by a PBY Catalina flying boat but received no damage. In mid-November, the battleship and other warships provided distant cover for the ultimately unsuccessful efforts to bombard Henderson Field again and land reinforcements on Guadalcanal. On 15 November 1942, following the Japanese defeat and loss of Hiei and Kirishima during the Naval Battle of Guadalcanal, the 3rd Battleship Division returned to Truk, where it remained for the rest of 1942.

=== 1943: Movement between bases ===
Haruna engaged no enemy targets during 1943. In late January 1943, she participated in "Operation Ke", as part of a diversionary force and distant cover supporting Japanese destroyers that were evacuating personnel from Guadalcanal. During 15–20 February 1943, the 3rd Battleship Division transferred from Truk to Kure Naval Base. From 23 February to 31 March 1943, Haruna was drydocked in Kure Naval Arsenal for upgrades, receiving additional Type 96 25 mm (0.98 in) antiaircraft guns and armor. On 17 May 1943, in response to the American invasion of Attu Island, Haruna sortied alongside Musashi, the 3rd Battleship Division, two fleet carriers, two cruisers and nine destroyers. Three days later, the submarine USS Sawfish discovered the task group, but was unable to attack. On 22 May 1943, the task force arrived in Yokosuka, where it was joined by an additional three fleet carriers and two light cruisers; the force was disbanded when Attu fell before the necessary preparations were finished. Throughout June 1943, Haruna was refitted at Yokosuka. On 18 September 1943, Haruna left Truk as part of a counterattack force in response to American raids on the Brown Islands in Micronesia, but no contact was made and the ship returned to the base.

On 17 October 1943, Haruna again left Truk as part of an even larger force—five battleships, three fleet carriers, eight heavy cruisers, three light cruisers and numerous destroyers—in response to American raids on Wake Island. When no contact was made the force returned to Truk on 26 October 1943. On 16 December 1943, she arrived at Sasebo for refits and inland-sea training.

=== 1944: Final combat actions ===
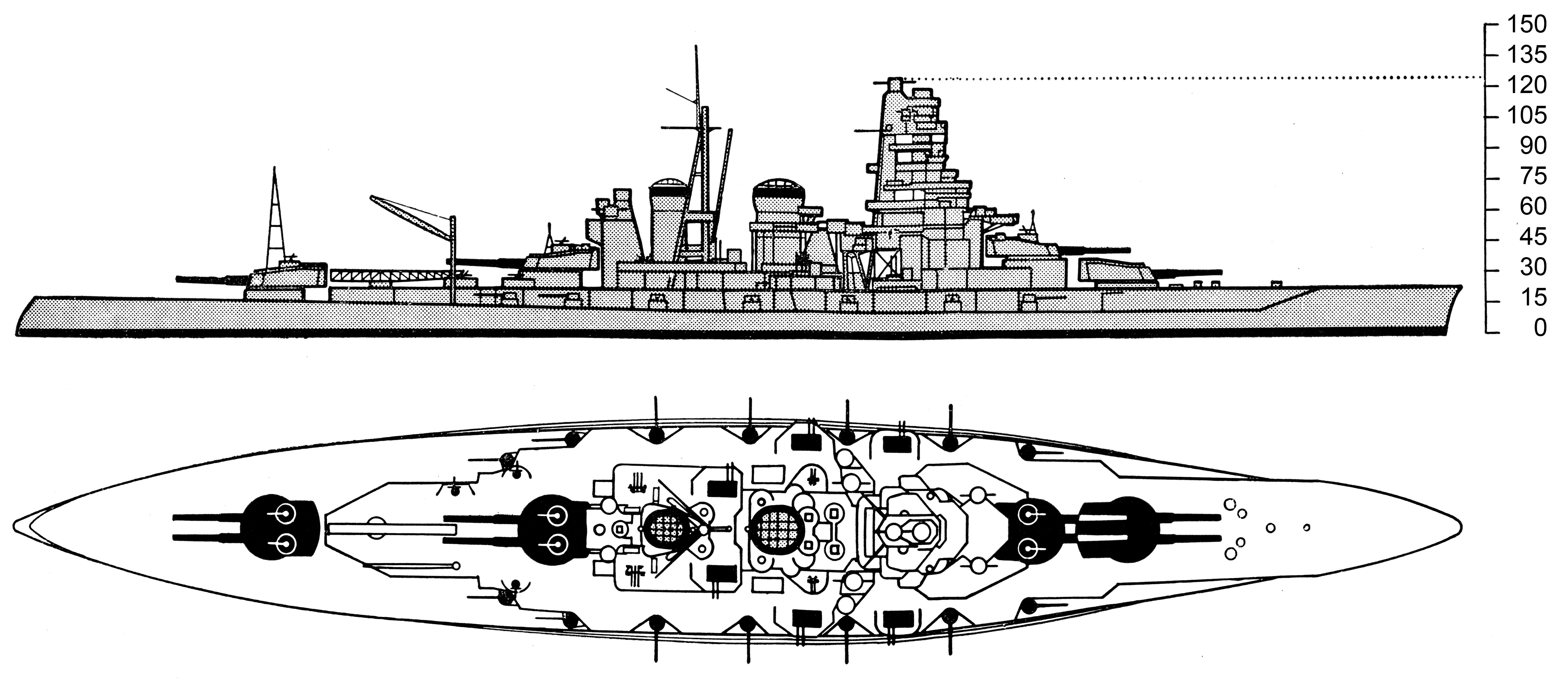
A drawing from the U.S. Office of Naval Intelligence depicting the Kongō class in 1944–1945

On 25 January 1944, Captain Kazu Shigenaga assumed command of Haruna while the ship was stationed at Kure. The 3rd Battleship Division departed Kure on 8 March 1944. Arriving at Lingga on 14 March 1944, the division remained for training until 11 May 1944. On 11 May 1944, Haruna and Admiral Ozawa's Mobile Fleet departed Lingga for Tawi-Tawi, where they were joined by Vice-Admiral Takeo Kurita's "Force C". On 13 June, Ozawa's Mobile Fleet departed Tawitawi for the Mariana Islands. During the Battle of the Philippine Sea, Haruna escorted Japanese fast carriers, and was hit by two 500 lb (230 kg) armor-piercing bombs on 20 June 1944 from U.S. carrier aircraft. On 24 June, she was drydocked in Kure for repairs and refitting. In August 1944 she transferred to Lingga.

==== Battle of Leyte Gulf ====
In October 1944, Haruna departed Lingga in preparation for "Operation Sho-1", Japan's counterattack during the Battle of Leyte Gulf, the largest naval engagement in history, as part of Admiral Takao Kurita's center force, consisting of herself and her sister ship Kongō, the battleship Nagato, and the "super battleships" Yamato and Musashi, the largest and most powerful battleships ever built, supported by ten heavy cruisers, two light cruisers, and fifteen destroyers.

On the 23rd, the submarine USS Darter sank the heavy cruiser Atago, followed by the submarine USS Dace torpedoing and sinking the heavy cruiser Maya, then Darter crippled the heavy cruiser Takao, forcing her out of the battle alongside two destroyers to escort her.

The next day, air attacks from US aircraft carriers persisted. Haruna survived with only minor damage from bomb splinters, but Musashi was sunk and the heavy cruiser Myōkō was crippled and forced out of the battle alongside two more destroyers to escort her.

A false retreat tricked the US into believing the Japanese center force was well out of the battle, leading to Admiral Halsey chasing Admiral Ozawa's decoy force. On the 25th, the diminished center force located Taffy 3, a small US task force of six escort carriers, three destroyers, and four destroyer escorts, prompting Haruna to fire away. She initially targeted the destroyer USS Johnston with her 6-inch (152 mm) secondary guns, but missed her shots before reengaging the escort carriers. At 7:54, Haruna hit the escort carrier USS Kalinin Bay with a 14-inch (356 mm) shell to her hangar bay from a distance of 16,400 yards (15,000 meters), disabling her aircraft elevator. Haruna was then targeted by destroyer-launched torpedoes, but they all missed. At 8:10, Haruna (probably) hit the escort carrier USS Gambier Bay with a 14-inch (356 mm) shell to her stern, causing negligible damage, as almost simultaneously Yamato hit her with an 18.1-inch (46 cm) shell that punched through her hangar bay. Haruna failed to hit Gambier Bay again as Yamato caused the majority of the fatal damage which sank the flat top.

After a fierce defensive action by the American ships, Admiral Kurita elected to withdraw, ending the battle.

Following the Japanese Navy's defeat at Leyte Gulf, Haruna returned to Brunei and Lingga for repairs. On 22 November 1944, she ran aground on a coral reef near Lingga, suffering serious damage to her watertight compartments and forcing her to return to Sasebo, where the hull was patched and repaired. On 2 December 1944, while returning to Japan from Southeast Asia as part of a task group, she evaded torpedoes fired by an American submarine. On 9 December, three more American submarines—USS Sea Devil, Plaice, and Redfish—intercepted the task group and they proceeded to permanently cripple the aircraft carrier Junyō with three torpedo hits. Unharmed, Haruna arrived at Sasebo the following day. At the end of 1944, she transferred to Kure for full repairs and upgrading, having survived a year in which four other Japanese battleships had been lost.

=== 1945: Sinking at Kure ===
On 1 January 1945, Haruna was removed from the deactivated 3rd Battleship Division and transferred to the 1st Battleship Division of the 2nd Fleet. On 10 February, Haruna was assigned to the Kure Naval District. On 19 March 1945, American carrier aircraft attacked the remainder of the Japanese Navy at Kure. The base was defended by veteran Japanese fighter instructors flying Kawanishi N1K-J "Shiden" or "George" fighters, led by the man who planned the attack on Pearl Harbor, Minoru Genda. These fighter planes were superior in some respects to America's main fighter, the F6F Hellcat. They surprised the attackers, destroyed several American aircraft, and defended the base from the brunt of the attack. Haruna sustained light damage from a single bomb on the starboard side, and remained at Kure.

On 24 July 1945, the U.S. Navy's Task Force 38 began a series of aerial attacks on Kure Naval Base to destroy the last remnants of Japan's navy. The same day, the battleship Hyūga was sunk, and Haruna was hit by a single bomb which caused light damage. Four days later, she sustained eight bomb hits from Task Force 38's aircraft and sank at her moorings at 16:15. In two days of attacks, 65 officers and men of Haruna were killed. Her remnants were raised from the sea floor in 1946 and broken up over the course of two months.

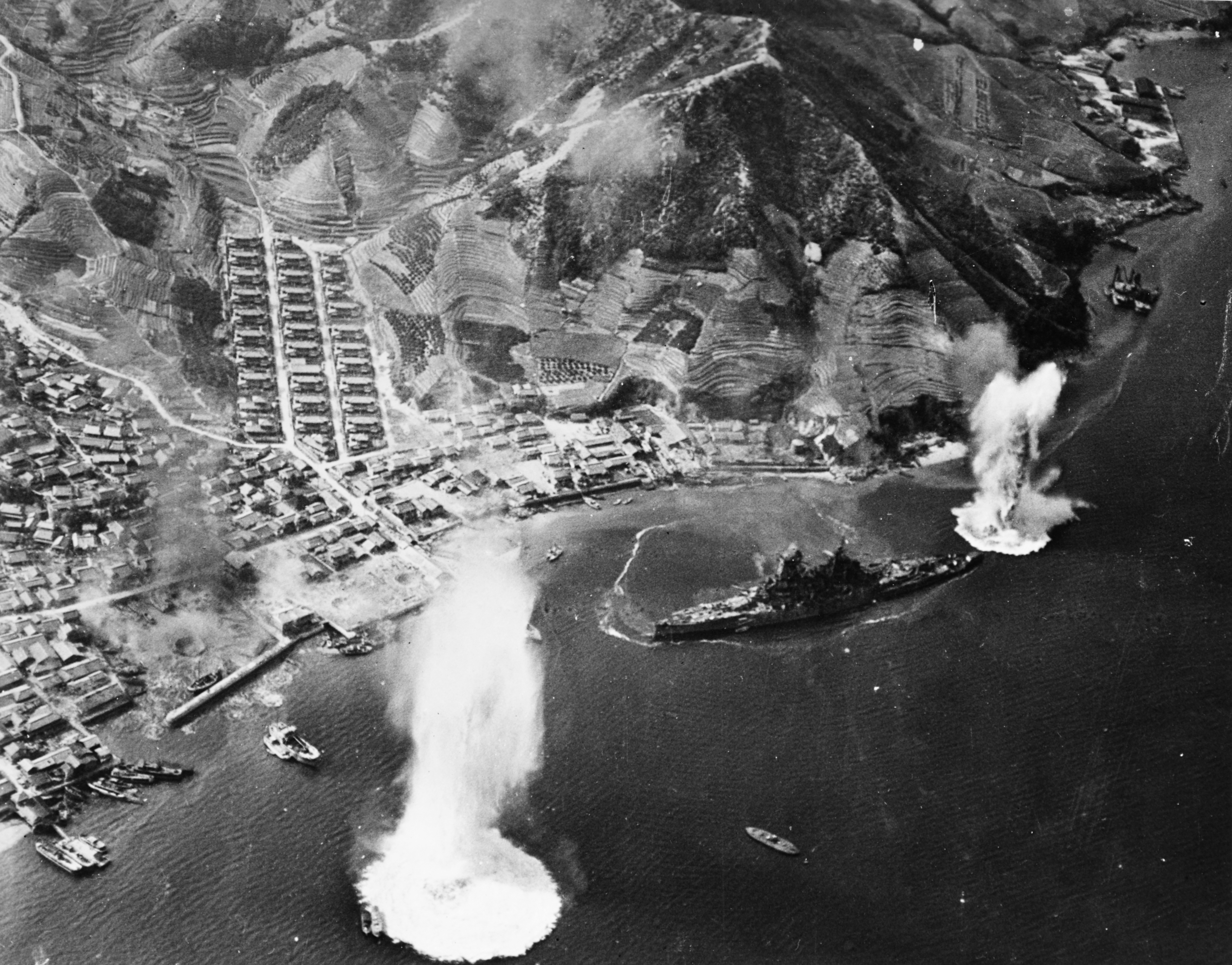
Haruna at her moorings near Kure, Japan, under attack by U.S. Navy carrier aircraft, 28 July 1945

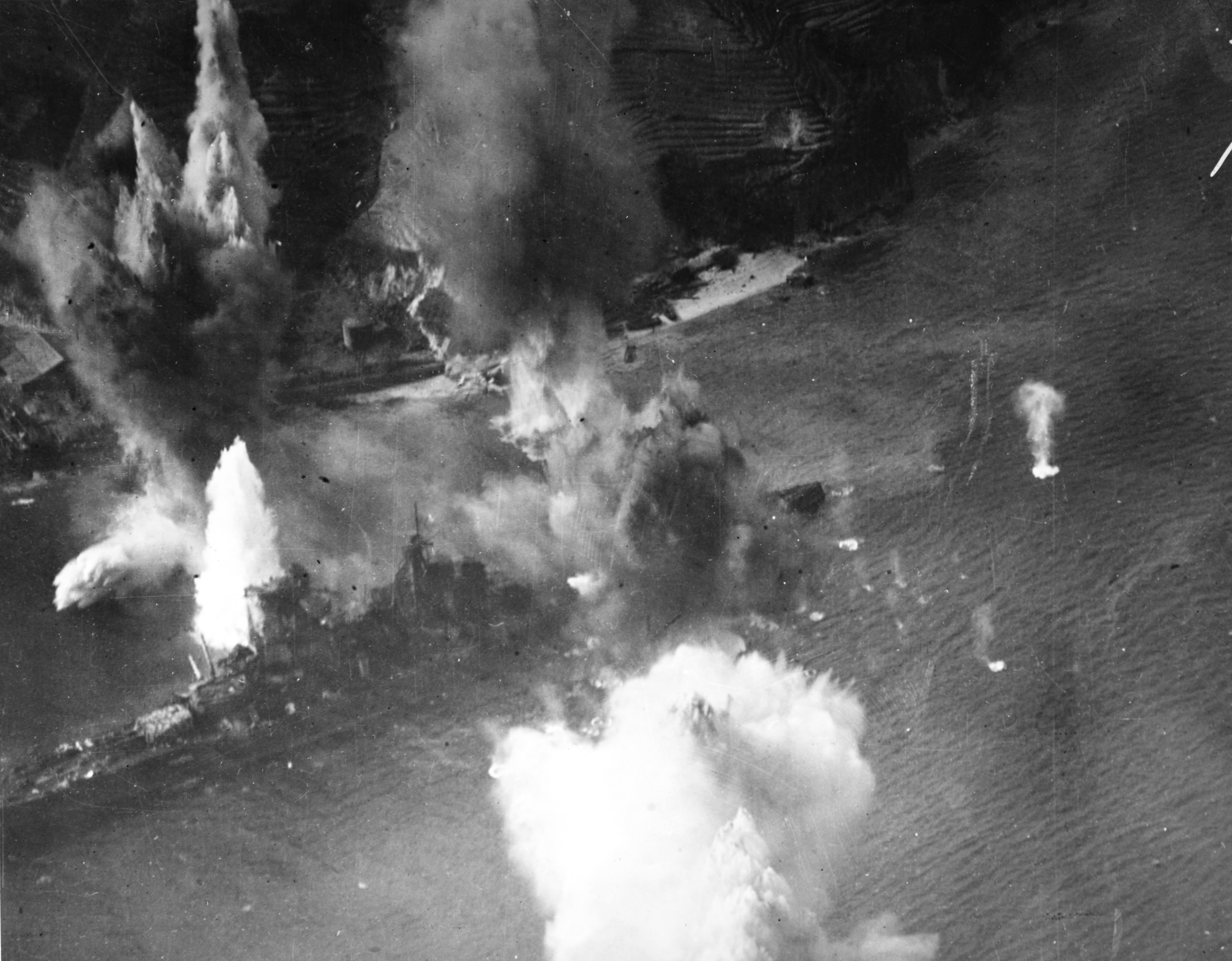
Under attack by U.S. Navy carrier aircraft, 28 July 1945 at close range.

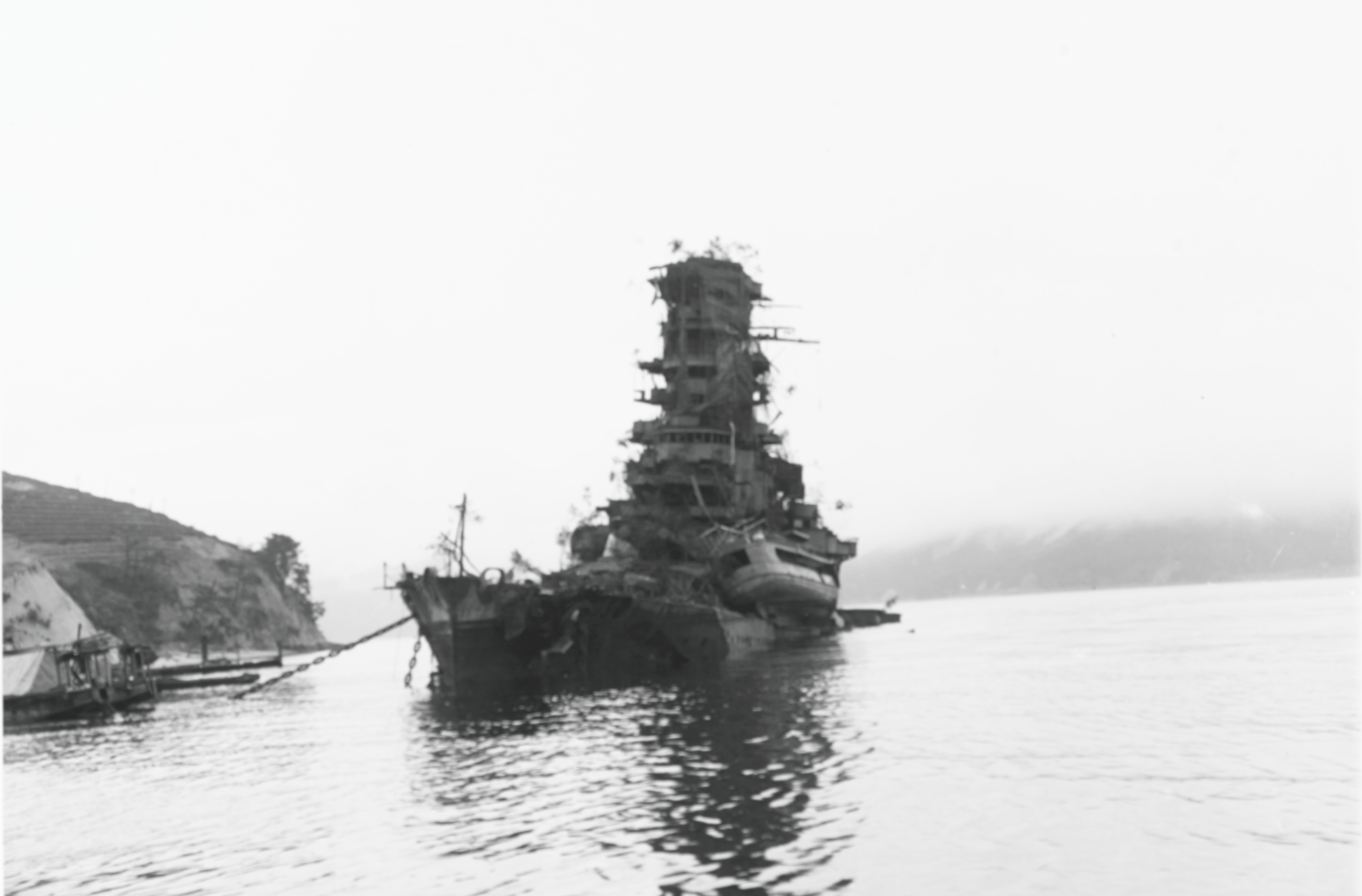
Haruna sunken at her moorings, 8 October 1945

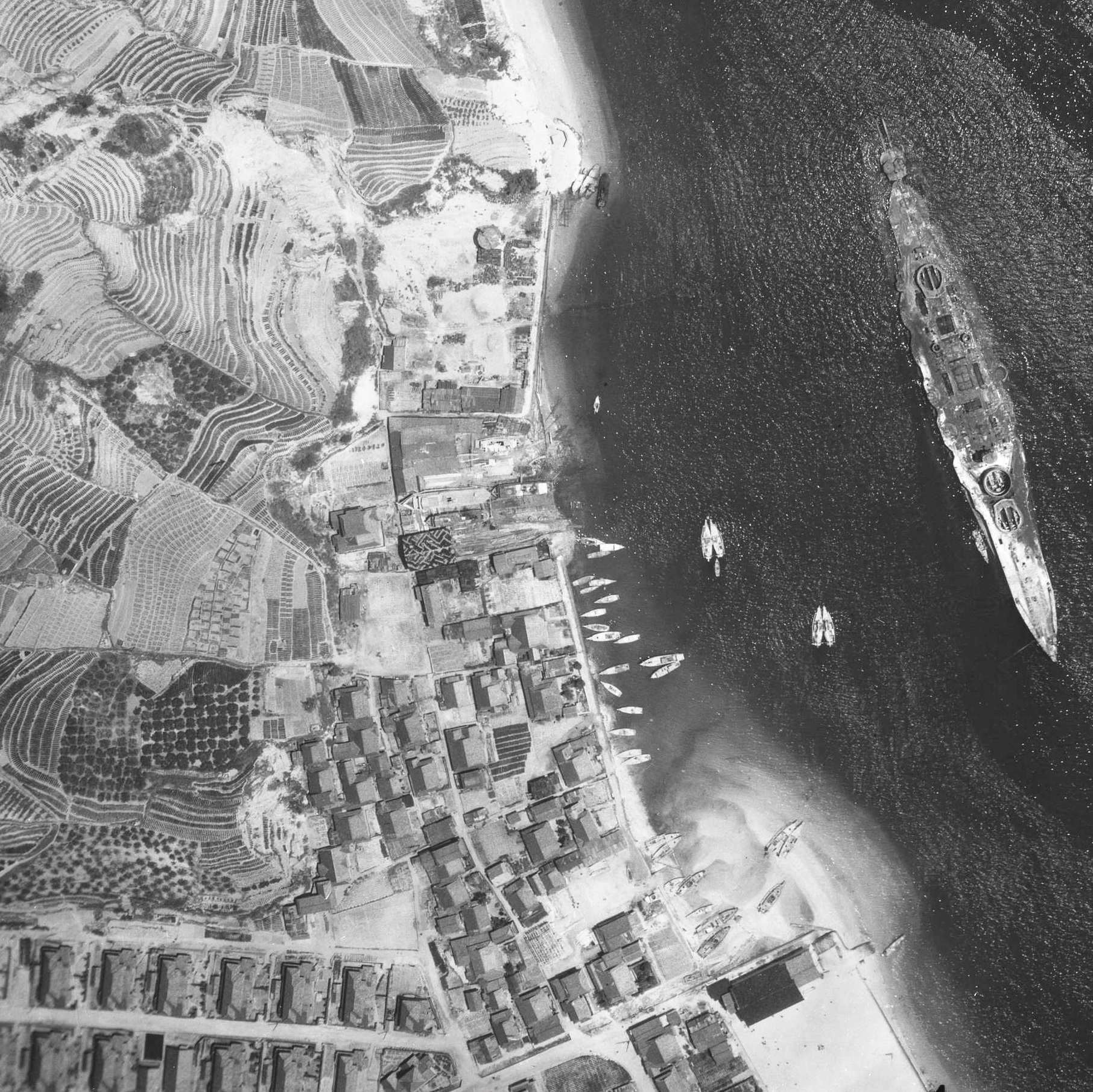
Wreck of Haruna partially scrapped, with her superstructure and guns removed, 19 May 1947

== General and cited references ==
- Boyle, David (1998). World War II in Photographs. London. Rebo Productions. ISBN 1-84053-089-8.
- Jackson, Robert (2000). The World's Great Battleships. Brown Books. ISBN 1-897884-60-5.
- Jackson, Robert (editor) (2008). 101 Great Warships. London: Amber Books. ISBN 978-1-905704-72-9.
- Lengerer, Hans (2025). "The Reconstruction of the Battle Fleet of the Imperial Japanese Navy Between the Wars, Part I". In Jordan, John (ed.). Warship 2025. London: Bloomsbury Publishing. pp. 8–21. ISBN 978-1-4728-6854-1.
- Lengerer, Hans & Ahlberg, Lars (2019). Capital Ships of the Imperial Japanese Navy 1868–1945: Ironclads, Battleships and Battle Cruisers: An Outline History of Their Design, Construction and Operations. Vol. I: Armourclad Fusō to Kongō Class Battle Cruisers. Zagreb, Croatia: Despot Infinitus. ISBN 978-953-8218-26-2.
- McCurtie, Francis (1989) [1945]. Jane's Fighting Ships of World War II. London: Bracken Books. ISBN 1-85170-194-X.
- Parshall, Jon; Hackett, Bob; Kingsepp, Sander; Nevitt, Allyn (1997–2009). "Imperial Japanese Navy Page".
- Reynolds, Clark G. (1968). The Fast Carriers; The Forging of an Air Navy. New York, Toronto, London, Sydney: McGraw-Hill Book Company. ISBN 1-55750-701-5.
- Reynolds, Clark G (1982). The Carrier War. Time-Life Books. ISBN 0-8094-3304-4.
- Schom, Alan (2004). The Eagle and the Rising Sun: The Japanese-American War, 1941–1943. Norton & Company. ISBN 0-393-32628-4.
- Steinberg, Rafael (1980) Return to the Philippines. Time-Life Books Inc. ISBN 0-8094-2516-5.
- Stille, Cdr Mark (2008). Imperial Japanese Navy Battleships 1941–1945. Oxford: Osprey Publishing. ISBN 978-1-84603-280-6.
- Swanston, Alexander and Swanston, Malcolm (2007). The Historical Atlas of World War II. London: Cartographica Press Ltd. ISBN 0-7858-2200-3.
- Willmott, H. P. and Keegan, John (2002) [1999]. The Second World War in the Far East. Smithsonian Books. LCCN 2004-49199. ISBN 1-58834-192-5.
