= Mitsubishi F1M =

Japanese reconnaissance floatplane

F1M
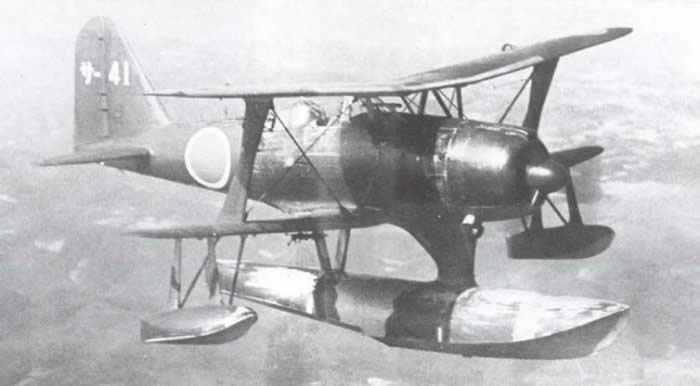
- A Mitsubishi F1M2 on patrol, c. 1943

General information
- Type: Reconnaissance floatplane
- National origin: Japan
- Manufacturer: Mitsubishi
- Status: Retired
- Primary user: Imperial Japanese Navy Air Service
- Number built: 944

History
- Introduction date: 1941
- First flight: June 1936

The Mitsubishi F1M (Allied reporting name "Pete") is a Japanese observation seaplane of World War II. It was the last biplane type of the Imperial Japanese Navy, with 944 built between 1936 and 1944. The Navy designation was "Type Zero Observation Seaplane" (零式水上観測機).

== Design and development ==
In 1934, the Imperial Japanese Navy issued a specification to Mitsubishi, Aichi and Kawanishi for a replacement for its Nakajima E8N floatplanes, which were used for short-ranged reconnaissance and observation missions from the Navy's warships. Mitsubishi's design, the Ka-17, given the short system designation F1M1 by the Japanese Navy, was a small all-metal biplane powered by a single Nakajima Hikari 1 radial engine rated at 610 kilowatts (820 hp), the same engine as used by Aichi's competing F1A. It had elliptical wings and great care had been taken to reduce drag, with the number of interplane struts and bracing wires minimised. The first of four F1M1s flew in June 1936.

While the F1M1 had better performance than the Aichi aircraft, it had poor stability both on the water and in the air, so the aircraft was redesigned to resolve these problems. The wings were redesigned, with straight tapered leading and trailing edges and rigged with greater dihedral, and the vertical fin and rudder were enlarged. The aircraft's floats were enlarged to increase buoyancy, and the Hikari engine was replaced by a 652 kilowatts (875 hp) Mitsubishi Zuisei 14-cylinder radial, giving better forward visibility. As modified, the aircraft's handling characteristics were greatly improved, and the modified aircraft was ordered into production as the Navy Type 0 observation seaplane Model 11 (rei-shiki kansokuki ichi-ichi-gata, Reikan in short), with the short designation F1M2. 940 series aircraft were built in total (342 by Mitsubishi and 598 by Sasebo Arsenal and 21st Arsenal) in addition to 4 prototypes (older publications present higher production figures, i.e., 1,016 or 1,118). (Note: Number of 940+4 is quoted by Wieliczko (2017), p. 19-21 (in Polish) derived from the latest Japanese research.)

The F1M2 had a maximum speed of 368 km/h (230 mph) and operating range of up to 1,072 km (670 mi) without external stores. An F1M airframe had a projected operational life of 350 flight hours, after which it needed replacing.

It provided the Imperial Japanese Navy with a very versatile operations platform.

The F1M was armed with a maximum of three 7.7 mm (.303 in) machine guns (two fixed forward-firing and one flexible rear-firing) with provision for two 60 kg (132 lb) bombs.

== Operational history ==
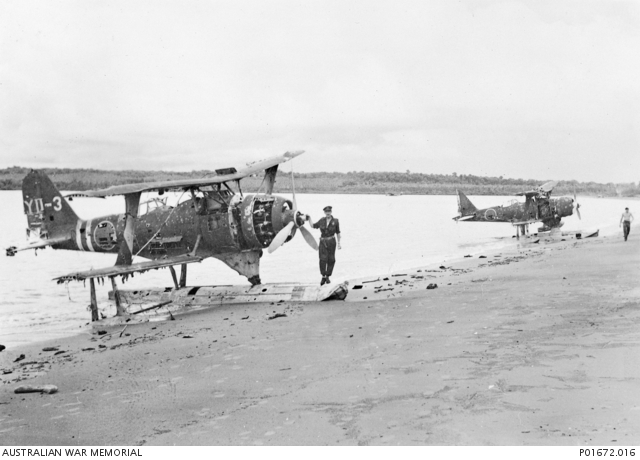
Damaged F1M2s at Rekata Bay, 1944.

The F1M was originally built as a catapult-launched reconnaissance float plane, specializing in gunnery spotting. The "Pete" took on a number of local roles including convoy escort, bomber, anti-submarine, maritime patrol, gunnery observation, rescue, transport, and anti-shipping strike. They were extensively used in the Solomons from seaplane bases or launched from ships, and proved very useful in observing enemy vessels at night, and occasionally harassing enemy shipping with bombs and machineguns, for example sinking Motor Torpedo Boat PT-34 on 9 April 1942. The type was also used as an area-defense fighter and engaged in aerial combat in the Aleutians, the Solomons and several other theaters. In the New Guinea front, it was often used in aerial combat with the Allied bombers and Allied fighters.

In 1945, at the war's end, Indonesians had taken some F1M2s to fight against the Dutch during the Indonesian National Revolution.

== Surviving aircraft ==
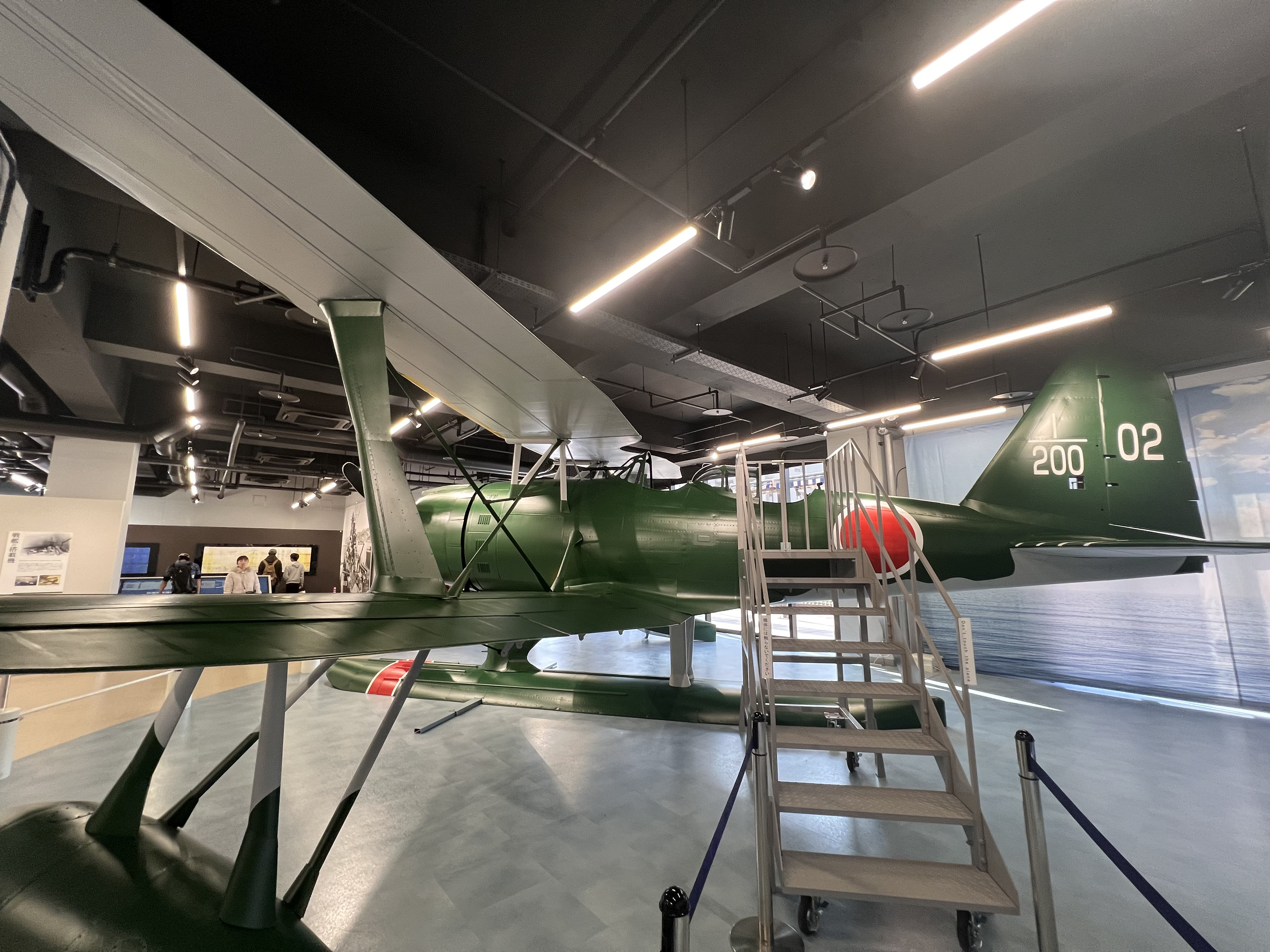
Replica of the Yamato Museum

In February 2023, four Mitsubishi F1M went on auction in the United States after being stored for more than 20 years.

In 2025, a replica was put on display in the Yamato Museum antenna during the main site maintenance..

== Variants ==
F1M1
Prototypes. Four built.
F1M2
Two-seat reconnaissance floatplane for the Imperial Japanese Navy.
F1M2-K
Two-seat training version.

== Operators ==
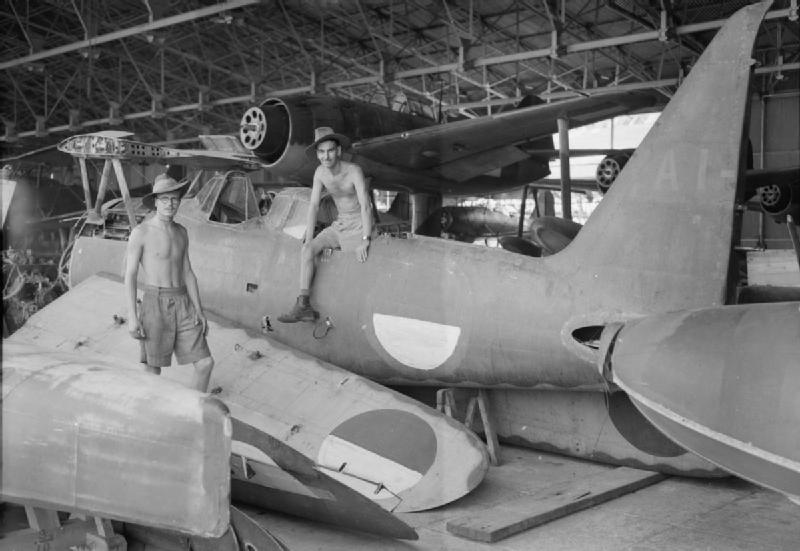
Personnel of 80 Squadron RAF amongst parts of a Japanese F1M, bearing Indonesian markings, at an airfield and seaplane base in Surabaya, Java. January 1946

Indonesia

- Indonesian Air Force

Empire of Japan

- Imperial Japanese Navy Air Service

Thailand

- Royal Thai Navy

== Specifications (F1M2) ==
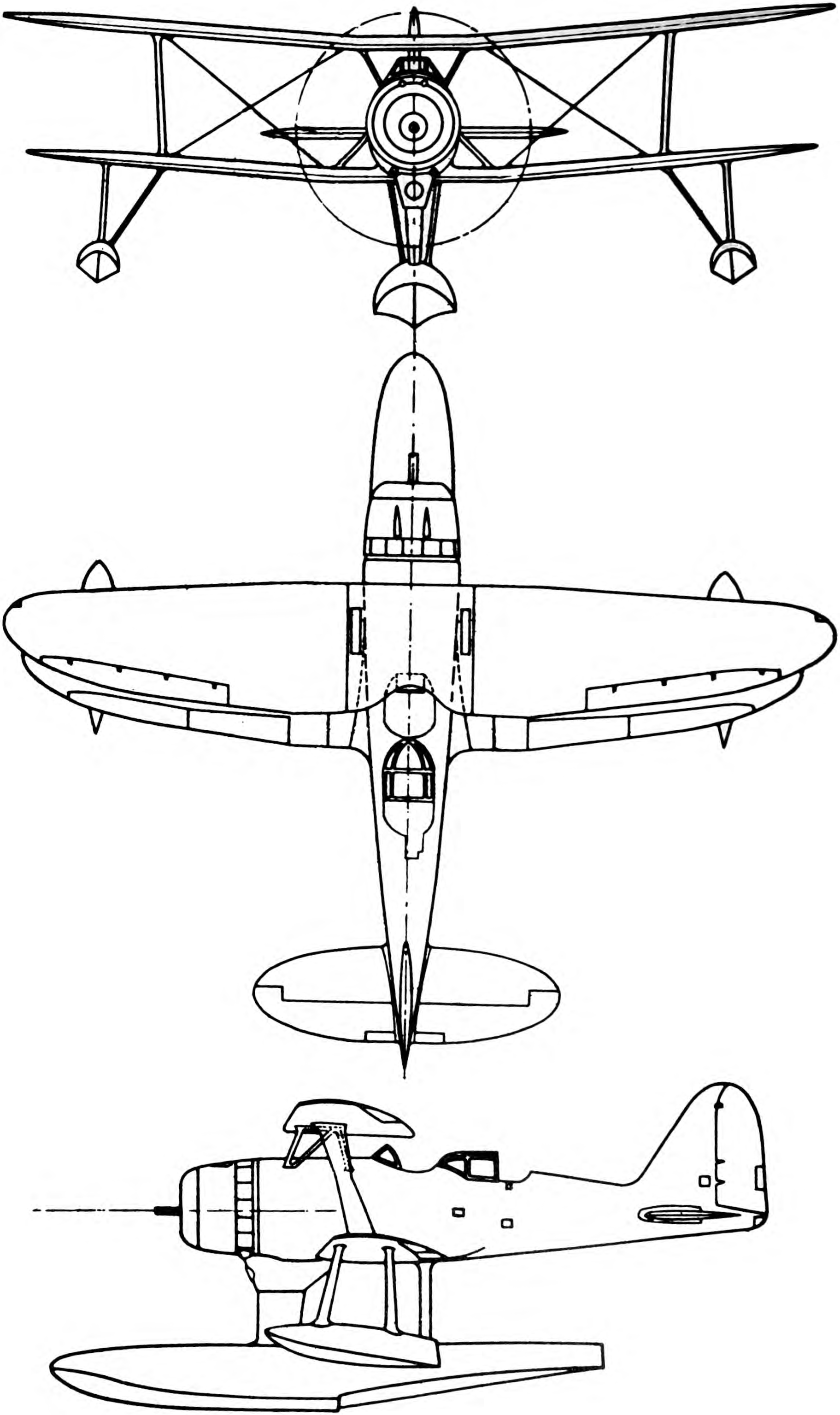
3-view drawing of the Mitsubishi F1M

Data from Japanese Aircraft of the Pacific War

General characteristics

- Crew: 2
- Length: 9.5 m (31 ft 2 in)
- Wingspan: 11 m (36 ft 1 in)
- Height: 4 m (13 ft 1 in)
- Wing area: 29.5 m^{2} (318 sq ft)
- Empty weight: 1,928 kg (4,251 lb)
- Gross weight: 2,550 kg (5,622 lb)
- Max takeoff weight: 2,856 kg (6,296 lb)
- Powerplant: 1 × Mitsubishi MK2C Zuisei 13 14-cylinder air-cooled radial piston engine, 652 kW (875 hp) for take-off

600 kW (800 hp) at 3,500 m (11,500 ft)

- Propellers: 3-bladed variable-pitch propeller

Performance

- Maximum speed: 370 km/h (230 mph, 200 kn) at 3,440 m (11,290 ft)
- Range: 740 km (460 mi, 400 nmi)
- Service ceiling: 9,440 m (30,970 ft)
- Time to altitude: 5,000 m (16,000 ft) in 9 min 36 sec
- Wing loading: 86.3 kg/m^{2} (17.7 lb/sq ft)
- Power/mass: 0.156 hp/lb (0.256 kW/kg)

Armament

- Guns:
  - 2 × fixed forward-firing 7.7 mm (.303 in) Type 97 aircraft machine guns
  - 1 × flexible rearward-firing 7.7 mm (.303 in) Type 92 machine gun
- Bombs: 2 × 60 kg (132 lb) bombs (1 × 250 kg bomb for Kamikaze missions)

== See also ==
Aircraft of comparable role, configuration, and era

- SOC Seagull
- Fairey Seafox

Related lists

- List of aircraft of World War II
- List of military aircraft of Japan
