= Nakajima E8N =

Japanese reconnaissance aircraft

E8N
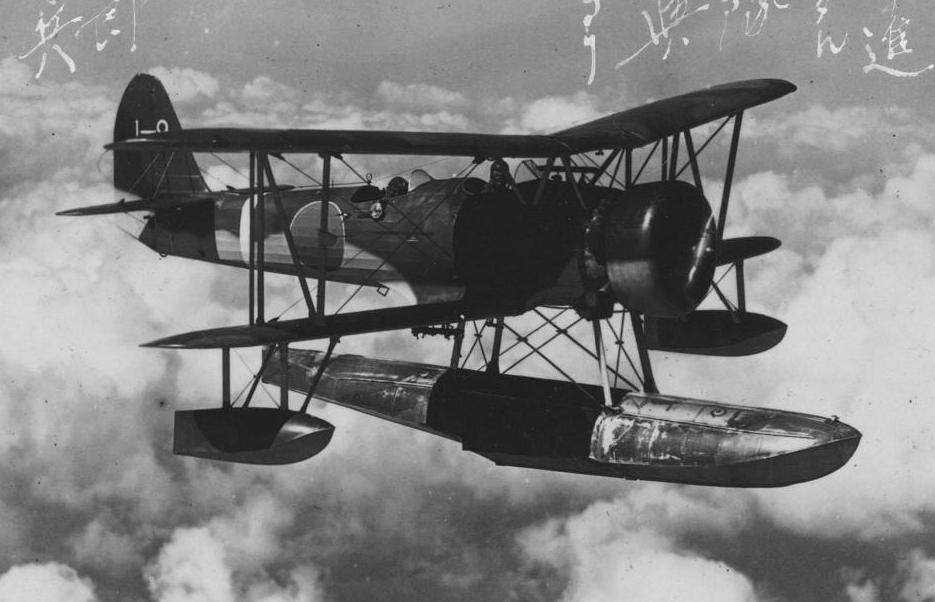

General information
- Type: Ship-borne reconnaissance seaplane
- Manufacturer: Nakajima Aircraft Company
- Primary users: Imperial Japanese Navy Air Service Royal Thai Navy; Kriegsmarine
- Number built: 755

History
- Manufactured: October 1935-1940
- Introduction date: 1935
- First flight: March 1934

The Nakajima E8N was a ship-borne catapult-launched reconnaissance seaplane designed and produced by the Japanese aviation manufacturer Nakajima Aircraft Company. Flown by the Imperial Japanese Navy Air Service (IJNAS), the Allies assigned it the reporting name "Dave" while it was identified by the British as the Nakajima KT-95 Dave.

The E8N originated as the MS proposal, an evolution of the preceding Nakajima E4N which the Imperial Japanese Navy (IJN) started seeking a replacement for in 1933. Unlike its monoplane competitors, Nakajima's design team opted for a biplane configuration. The first prototype made its maiden flight in March 1934. Months later, it was competitively evaluated and selected as the winner by the IJN, receiving the service designation Navy Type 95 Reconnaissance Seaplane Model 1. The E8N was produced both by Nakajima and Kawanishi Aircraft Company between 1935 and 1940.

Primarily operated by the Imperial Japanese Navy Air Service (IJNAS), it made its combat debut during the Second Sino-Japanese War. In the Chinese theatre, it proved capable of downing multiple enemy fighters in addition to its more expected duties, which included artillery spotting and dive-bombing. Production of the type had already ceased one year prior to the start of the Pacific War in favour of newer aircraft, however, the E8N still saw limited frontline use early on in this conflict, as well as more lengthy service in secondary roles, including as a liaison and training aircraft. Export sales of the type were also achieved, resulting in small numbers of E8Ns being delivered to both the Royal Thai Navy and the Kriegsmarine; the former would use their aircraft in combat against the Allies in 1945.

== Design and development ==
The origins of the Nakajima E8N can be traced back to 1933 and the issuing of a specification by the Imperial Japanese Navy (IJN) that sought a twin-seat floatplane to replace its existing Nakajima E4N aircraft in the shipboard reconnaissance mission. The prospective aircraft would be used onboard various ship types of the IJN, from seaplane tenders to battleships and cruisers. Of the three Japanese aircraft manufacturers to produce a response, the Kawanishi Aircraft Company and Aichi Kokuki KK both produced low-wing monoplane designs, while the third, Nakajima Aircraft Company, opted for an evolutionary development of the earlier E4N biplane, which it assigned the internal designation MS.

In comparison to the E4N, the MS was equipped with revised wings, which had a reduced chord and area; furthermore, the sweep of the upper wing was increased while the tail unit was furnished with tall vertical surfaces and lacked a dorsal fin. It featured all-metal structure and a fabric covering. The E8N was typically flown by a crew of two, which were seated in open cockpits. It was furnished with a large central float along with a pair of underwing outriggers. Power was provided by a single Nakajima Kotobuki 2-KAI 2 nine-cylinder radial engine, capable of producing up to 580 hp, which drove a twin-bladed propeller. Nakajima's design team was headed by Eng Kishiro Matsuo.

In March 1934, the first prototype performed its maiden flight; a further six aircraft would be produced for experimental purposes. Following the completion of manufacturer's testing, prototypes were transferred to the IJN, which used them in a series of comparative trials against the competing aircraft produced by Aichi and Kawanishi. On account of its superior manoeuvrability, rugged design, and favourable handling characteristics, Nakajima's submission was selected as the competition winner. In October 1935, the IJN approved the type for operation, at which point it received the designation Navy Type 95 Reconnaissance Seaplane Model 1.

Quantity production of the E8N proceeded; while the majority of aircraft were manufactured by Nakajima at their Koizumi facility, it was also produced by the rival firm Kawanishi under licence in Konan. A total of 755 E8Ns were completed between the two companies between 1935 and 1940, the year in which production was terminated.

== Operational history ==
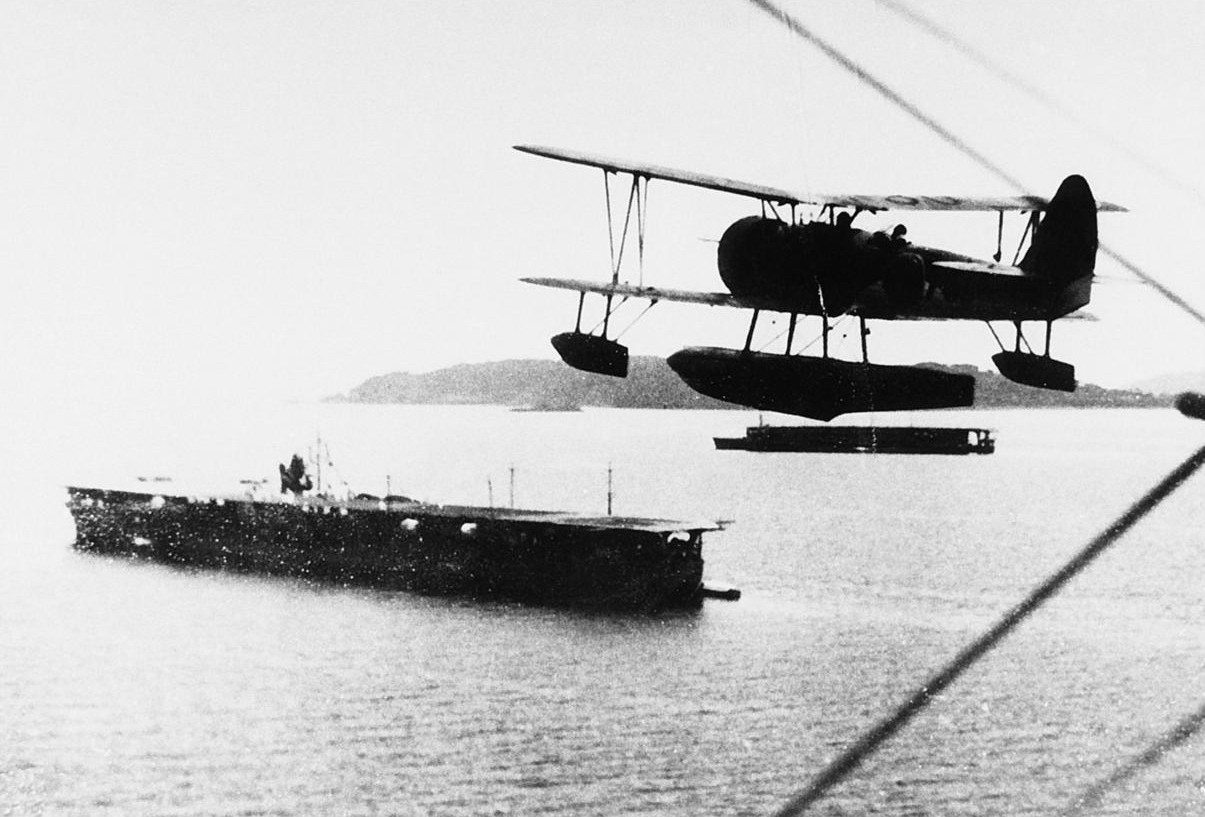
An IJN E8N flying by the Japanese aircraft carriers Sōryū and Ryujo, 1938

The E8N was primarily operated by the Imperial Japanese Navy Air Service (IJNAS), by 1940, the type was in use aboard all IJN capital ships then in service, along with 16 cruisers and five seaplane tenders.

The aircraft was first used in combat during the Second Sino-Japanese War. Despite being designed to perform reconnaissance missions, there were several instances of E8Ns successfully downing opposing Chinese fighters. More routinely, it conducted artillery spotting and dive-bombing of Chinese positions.

During early 1941, a single E8N was purchased by the German Naval Attache to Japan, Vice-Admiral Paul Wenneker. It was dispatched on board the KM Münsterland to rendezvous with the German auxiliary cruiser Orion at the Maug Islands in the Marianas. The meeting occurred on 1 February 1941, and Orion thus became the only German naval vessel of the Second World War to employ a Japanese float plane.

The Royal Thai Navy placed an order for eighteen E8Ns in 1938. These aircraft were delivered in 1940 and were locally reclassified as the BRN-1. Thailand's aircraft did not undertake any combat action until 1945, when they were used to respond to the Allies' Operation Livery. During this action, a single BRN-1 was totally destroyed while two others were written off. The remaining fifteen aircraft served on after the conflict until a lack of spare parts necessitated their decommissioning and scrapping.

By the outbreak of the Pacific War, the IJN were already in the process of replacing the E8N, however, numerous aircraft were in frontline service during the first few months of the conflict. During the Battle of Midway, one E8N launched from the battleship Haruna to perform aerial reconnaissance during the Battle of Midway. In general, though, they were soon replaced by more modern aircraft such as the Aichi E13A and the Mitsubishi F1M and reassigned to second-line duties, such as a seaplane trainer, communications and liaison work.

== Variants ==
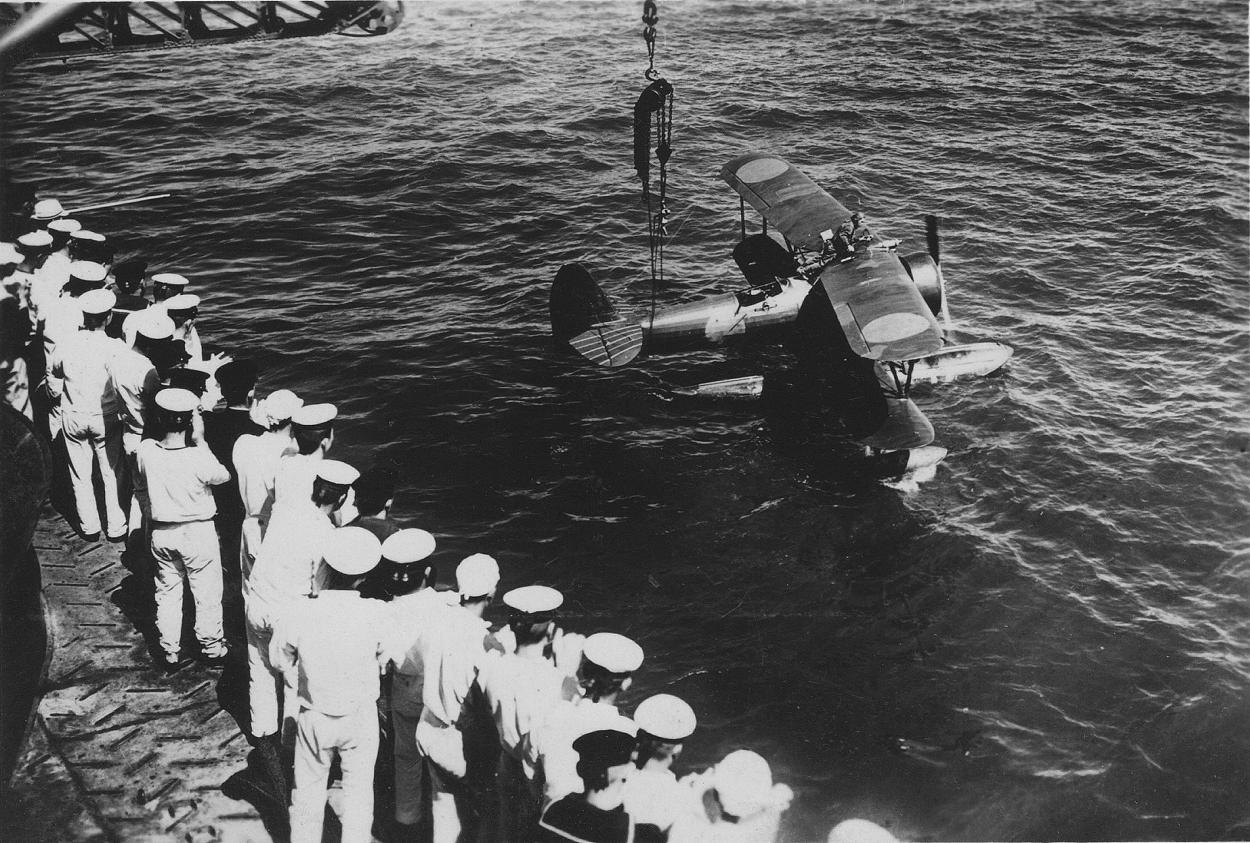
A E8N alighting the ocean

E8N1
Initial production type, powered by 433 kW (580 hp) Nakajima Kotobuki 2 Kai 1 radial engine.
E8N2
Improved production type, with more powerful (470 kW/630 hp) Nakajima Kotobuki Kai 2 engine.

== Operators ==
Japan

- Imperial Japanese Navy Air Service

Thailand

- Royal Thai Navy

Nazi Germany

- Kriegsmarine
  - Auxiliary cruiser Orion

== Specifications (E8N2) ==
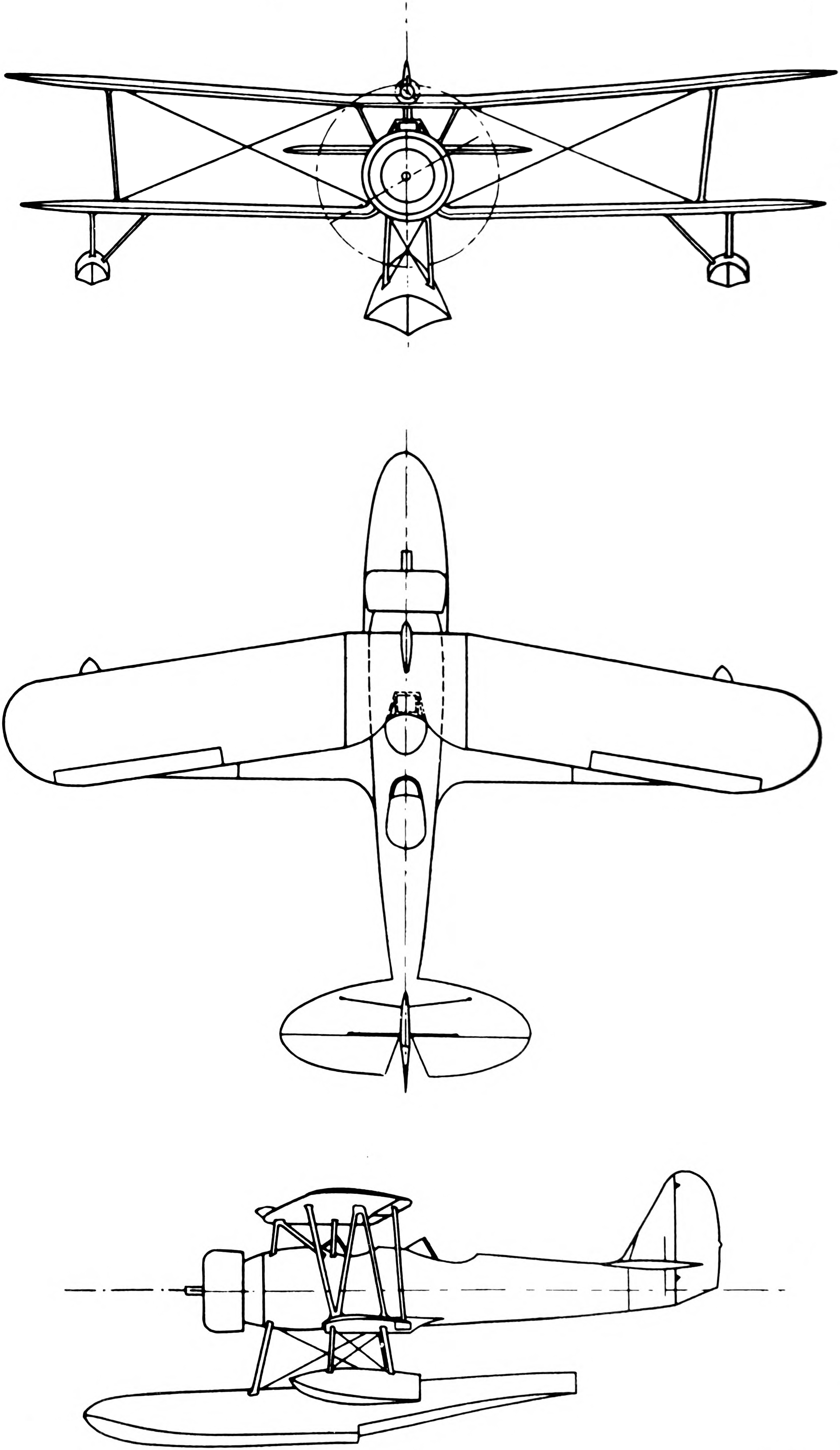
3-view drawing of the Nakajima E8N

Data from Japanese Aircraft of the Pacific War, www.combinedfleet.com

General characteristics

- Crew: 2
- Length: 8.81 m (28 ft 11 in)
- Wingspan: 10.98 m (36 ft 0 in)
- Height: 3.84 m (12 ft 7 in)
- Wing area: 26.5 m^{2} (285 sq ft)
- Empty weight: 1,320 kg (2,910 lb)
- Gross weight: 1,900 kg (4,189 lb)
- Powerplant: × Nakajima Kotobuki 2-KAI 2 nine-cylinder air-cooled radial piston engine, 470 kW (630 hp) for take-off

343 kW (460 hp) at 3,000 m (9,800 ft)

- Propellers: 2-bladed fixed-pitch propeller

Performance

- Maximum speed: 300 km/h (190 mph, 160 kn) at 3,000 m (9,800 ft)
- Cruise speed: 185 km/h (115 mph, 100 kn)
- Range: 898 km (558 mi, 485 nmi)
- Service ceiling: 7,270 m (23,850 ft)
- Time to altitude: 3,000 m (9,800 ft) in six minutes and 31 seconds
- Wing loading: 71.7 kg/m^{2} (14.7 lb/sq ft)
- Power/mass: 0.2491 kW/kg (0.1515 hp/lb)

Armament

- Guns: 1 × fixed, forward-firing 7.7 mm machine gun and 1 × flexible 7.7 mm machine gun in rear cockpit
- Bombs: 2 × 30 kg (66 lb) bombs

== See also ==
Related development

- E4N

Aircraft of comparable role, configuration, and era

- Fairey Seafox

Related lists

- List of aircraft of World War II
