= Aichi Kokuki =

1898–1966 aircraft, engine and automobile manufacturer in Japan

Coordinates: 35.1337981°N 136.8969623°E

- Type: Limited company
- Industry: Aircraft manufacturing
- Founded: 1898; 128 years ago in Nagoya, Japan
- Fate: Integrated into Nissan
- Successor: Aichi Machine Industry Co., Ltd
- Products: Aircraft
- Parent: Nissan
- Website: Aichi Kokuki corporate website

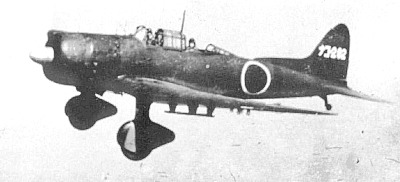
Japanese Navy's 1939 type carrier-based dive bomber during World War II

Aichi Kokuki KK (愛知航空機株式会社, Aichi Kōkūki Kabushiki Kaisha; Aichi Aircraft Co., Ltd.) was a Japanese aerospace manufacturer which produced several designs for the Imperial Japanese Navy. After the war, the company was reorganized as Aichi Machine Industry Co., Ltd (愛知機械工業) where they made small kei cars until 1966 when they were integrated into Nissan and developed the Nissan Sunny and Nissan Vanette.

== History ==
=== Aichi Watch and Electric Manufacturing ===
The company was established in 1898 in Nagoya as Aichi Tokei Denki Seizo Kabushiki Kaisha (Aichi Watch and Electric Manufacturing Co., Ltd.). Aircraft production started in 1920, and the company relied initially on technical assistance from Heinkel, which influenced some of their designs. Later, with the prodding and support of the Imperial Japanese Navy, the company started making seaplanes using technology imported from Short Brothers in the UK.

During the inter-war period, Aichi was the beneficiary of technology transferred from Heinkel of Germany. At the time, a team from the League of Nations occasionally visited German aircraft manufacturers to monitor the ban on military aircraft research and production. A Japanese military attache who was a member of the monitoring team, let Heinkel know, confidentially and in advance, of the planned visits. Heinkel thus succeeded in continuing its design on the aircraft ordered by Aichi Aircraft without being spotted.

In 1943 the aircraft division was spun off as Aichi Kokuki Kabushiki Kaisha (Aichi Aircraft Co., Ltd.).

=== Aichi Machine Industry ===
After the war, the company was reorganized, manufacturing kei cars under the Cony brand name in Japan. Its current descendant, Aichi Kikai Kōgyō Kabushiki Kaisha (Aichi Machine Industry Co., Ltd.), is integrated with the Nissan corporate structure.

== Products ==
=== Aircraft ===
Model name	First flight	Number built	Type
Aichi AB-1	1928	1	Single engine biplane airliner
Aichi AB-2	1930	2	Single engine biplane reconnaissance floatplane
Aichi AB-3	1932	1	Single engine biplane reconnaissance floatplane
Aichi AB-4	1932	6	Single engine biplane reconnaissance flying boat
Aichi AB-5		1	License built single engine biplane floatplane
Aichi AB-6	1933	1	Single engine biplane reconnaissance floatplane
Aichi AB-7		2	Single engine biplane reconnaissance floatplane
Aichi AB-8		1	Single engine biplane dive bomber
Aichi AB-9		1	Single engine biplane dive bomber
Aichi AB-10			Single engine biplane dive bomber
Aichi AB-11	N/A	0	Single engine biplane dive bomber
Aichi AB-12	1934	15	Single engine biplane reconnaissance flying boat
Aichi AB-13	1936	2	Single engine biplane reconnaissance floatplane
Aichi AB-14	1937	17	Single engine biplane reconnaissance flying boat
Aichi AM-7	N/A	0	Unbuilt single engine monoplane reconnaissance floatplane
Aichi AM-10	N/A	0	Unbuilt single engine monoplane reconnaissance floatplane
Aichi AM-15	N/A	0	Unbuilt single engine monoplane fighter or unbuilt single engine monoplane sports plane (Note: The AM-15 designation was used for two different designs.)
Aichi AM-16	N/A	0	Twin engine monoplane reconnaissance flying boat
Aichi AM-17	1938	1,495	Single engine monoplane dive bomber
Aichi AM-18		2	Single engine monoplane reconnaissance floatplane
Aichi AM-19		133 (Note: An additional 1,285 aircraft were built by Kyushu and Hiro.)	Single engine monoplane reconnaissance floatplane
Aichi AM-20	N/A	0	Unbuilt single engine monoplane reconnaissance airplane
Aichi AM-21	1940	31	Twin engine monoplane trainer flying boat
Aichi AM-22	1942	256	Single engine monoplane reconnaissance floatplane
Aichi AM-23	1942	114	Single engine monoplane torpedo bomber
Aichi AM-24	1943	28	Single engine monoplane dive bomber floatplane
Aichi AM-25	N/A	2	Twin engine monoplane night fighter
Aichi AM-26	N/A	0	Unbuilt single engine monoplane torpedo bomber
Aichi Type H		2 (Note: An additional 2 pattern aircraft were built by Heinkel.)	License built single engine biplane carrier fighter
Aichi Type 2 Single-seat Reconnaissance Seaplane		1 (Note: An additional 1 pattern aircraft was built by Heinkel.)	License built single engine biplane reconnaissance floatplane
Aichi Type 15-Ko Reconnaissance Seaplane	1925	4	Single engine monoplane reconnaissance floatplane
Aichi Type 2 Two-seat Reconnaissance Seaplane		16	License built single engine biplane reconnaissance floatplane

==== Engines ====
- Aichi AC-1 – 1929 experimental nine-cylinder radial engine
- Aichi Atsuta (アツタ or 熱田) – licensed copy of the Daimler-Benz DB 601A inverted V12
- Aichi Ha-70 – two Atsuta engines coupled together

=== Automotive ===
==== Nissan engines ====
- Nissan A engine
- HR15DE / HR16DE
- CR12DE / CR14DE
- QG13DE / QG15DE / QG16DE / QG18DE

==== Transmissions ====
- FS6R31 – with synchronous control.
- F30A / F50A / F70A
- MFA60 / MFA80
- W60A
- FS5R30A
- MRA70
- GR6

==== Vehicles manufactured ====
- Nissan Cherry
- Nissan Sunny
- Nissan Vanette
- Nissan Serena (Largo)
- Cony Guppy, a two-seat microcar
- Cony 360 Wide, a cabover keitora/Microvan/minitruck
- Cony Giant 360, predecessor to Cony 360
- Cony 360 a passenger kei car
