= Ondo-class oiler =

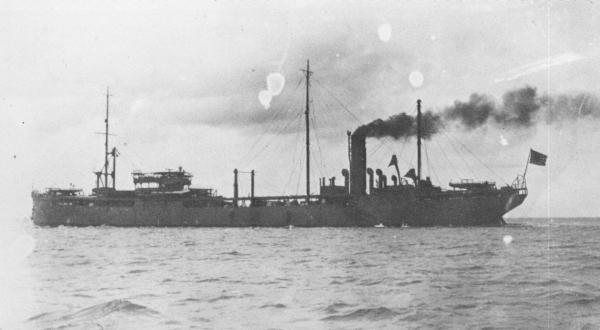
- Naruto on 19 May 1932.

Class overview
- Name: Ondo-class oiler
- Builders: Kawasaki Shipbuilding Corporation; Kure Naval Arsenal; Yokosuka Naval Arsenal
- Operators: Imperial Japanese Navy
- Preceded by: Kamoi
- Succeeded by: Kazahaya
- Cost: 2,250,000 JPY
- Built: 1922–1924
- In commission: 1923–1946
- Planned: 5
- Completed: 3
- Canceled: 2
- Lost: 2
- Retired: 1

General characteristics
- Displacement: 15,400 long tons (15,647 t) standing
- Length: 138.68 m (455 ft 0 in) Lpp
- Beam: 17.68 m (58 ft 0 in)
- Draught: 8.08 m (26 ft 6 in)
- Propulsion: Ondo; 1 × triple-expansion engine; 4 × Kampon water tube boilers; single shaft, 3,750 shp; Hayatomo and Naruto; 1 × triple-expansion engine; 4 × Miyahara model water tube boilers; single shaft, 3,750 shp
- Speed: 12 knots (14 mph; 22 km/h)
- Capacity: 8,000 tons for oil
- Complement: 157
- Armament: Ondo, 1923; 2 × 140 mm (5.5 in) L/50 naval guns; 2 × 76.2 mm (3.00 in) L/40 AA guns

The Ondo-class oilers (隠戸型給油艦, Ondo-gata kyūyukan) were a class of three oilers of the Imperial Japanese Navy (IJN), serving during the 1920s and World War II.

== Construction ==
The Ondo class was initially planned in 1920 as the six of the Kamoi-class oilers under the Eight-eight fleet final plan. However, of the Kamoi-class oilers, only the Kamoi was completed, due to the conclusion and signing of the Washington Naval Treaty. The other five vessels were then re-planned to the Modified Notoro class.

Out of the five ships, one became the icebreaker Ōtomari, while the other become the food supply ship Mamiya. Therefore, only three ships were built as Modified Notoro-class (Ondo-class) oilers.

== Service in peacetime ==
They devoted themselves to importing crude oil from North America and Southeast Asia. The crude oil which the Ondo class and the Notoro class carried to Japan was 388 sorties; 3,000,000 tons, until 1941.

== Service in Pacific War ==
They were not able to accompany the fleet, because they had low speed. They were engaged in supply duties at naval bases.

== Ships in class ==
Ship	Builder	Laid down	Launched	Completed	Fate
Ondo (隠戸)	Kawasaki-Kōbe Shipyard	15-03-1922	21-10-1922	12-03-1923	Sunk by air raid at Manila Bay 13-11-1944.
Hayatomo (早鞆)	Kure Naval Arsenal	14-03-1922	04-12-1922	18-05-1924	Scuttled off Singapore, 1946. Decommissioned on 03-05-1947.
Naruto (鳴戸)	Yokosuka Naval Arsenal	11-04-1922	30-01-1923	30-10-1924	Heavy damaged by air raid at Rabaul, 14-01-1944 and grounded. Damaged once again 02-03-1944. Scuttled 15-03-1944.
2 vessels					Re-planned as an icebreaker and food supply ship.

== Photo ==
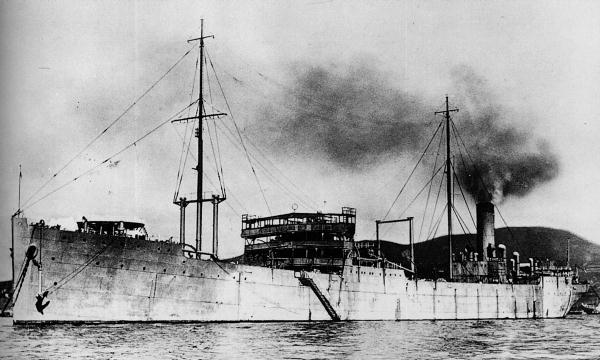
Hayatomo

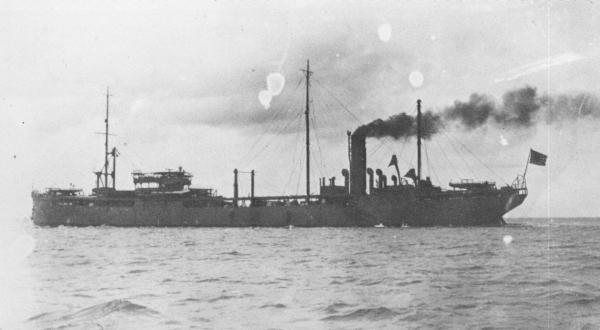
Naruto on 29 May 1932 at Yokosuka

== See also ==
八八艦隊案 (ja)

== Bibliography ==
- "Rekishi Gunzō"., History of Pacific War Vol.37, "Support vessels of the Imperial Japanese Forces", Gakken (Japan), June 2002, ISBN 4-05-602780-3
- Ships of the World special issue Vol.47, Auxiliary Vessels of the Imperial Japanese Navy, "Kaijinsha". (Japan), March 1997
- The Maru Special, Japanese Naval Vessels No.34, "Japanese auxiliary vessels", "Ushio Shobō". (Japan), December 1979
- Senshi Sōsho Vol.31, Naval armaments and war preparation (1), "Until November 1941", Asagumo Simbun (Japan), November 1969
