= Notoro-class oiler =

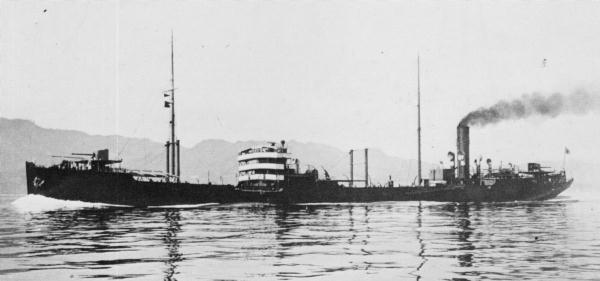
- Tsurumi in 1922

Class overview
- Name: Notoro class; later Erimo class
- Builders: Kawasaki Shipbuilding Corporation; Yokohama Dock Company; Ōsaka Iron Works
- Operators: Imperial Japanese Navy
- Preceded by: Noma
- Succeeded by: Kamoi
- Cost: 1,500,000 JPY
- Built: 1919–1922
- In commission: 1920–1945
- Planned: 7
- Completed: 7
- Lost: 6

General characteristics
- Type: Oiler
- Displacement: 15,400 long tons (15,647 t) standing
- Length: 138.68 m (455 ft 0 in) p/p
- Beam: 17.68 m (58 ft 0 in)
- Draught: 8.08 m (26 ft 6 in)
- Propulsion: Irō; 1 × triple expansion reciprocating engine; 4 × Kampon water tube boilers; single shaft, 3,750 shp (2,800 kW); All others; 1 × triple expansion reciprocating engine; 4 × Scotch boilers; single shaft, 3,750 shp (2,800 kW)
- Speed: 12 knots (22 km/h; 14 mph)
- Capacity: 8,000 tons of fuel oil
- Complement: Irō: 157; All others: 142
- Armament: Notoro, Shiretoko, Erimo and Irō; 2 × 120 mm (4.7 in) L/45 naval guns; 2 × 76.2 mm (3 in) L/40 AA guns; Sata, Tsurumi and Shiriya; 2 × 140 mm (5.5 in) L/50 naval guns; 2 × 76.2 mm (3 in) L/40 AA guns

The Notoro-class oilers (能登呂型給油艦, Notoro-gata kyūyukan) were a class of seven oilers of the Imperial Japanese Navy (IJN), serving during the 1920s and World War II. They were also called the Erimo-class oilers (襟裳型給油艦, Erimo-gata kyūyukan), after Notoro and Shiretoko were converted to other ship types.

== Construction ==
They were built under pre-Eight-eight fleet plans, the Eight-four fleet plan and the Eight-six fleet plan. All ships of the class were named after capes in Japan (e.g. Irō is a cape at the southern tip of Izu Peninsula).

== Service history ==
The class devoted themselves to importing crude oil from North America and Southeast Asia. The Notoro and the Ondo classes made 388 voyages carrying a total of 3,000,000 tons of oil up to 1941.

During World War II they were not able to accompany the fleet, due to their low speed. Instead they were engaged in supply duties at naval bases.

== Ships in class ==
Ship	Builder	Laid down	Launched	Completed	Fate
Notoro (能登呂)	Kawasaki-Kōbe Shipyard	24 November 1919	17 July 1920	20 September 1920	Converted to seaplane tender, 1 June 1934. Scuttled off Singapore, 12 January 1947.
Shiretoko (知床)	Kawasaki-Kōbe Shipyard	24 November 1919	3 May 1920	10 August 1920	Converted to collier, 1928. Later re-converted to munition ship. Sunk by air raid at Singapore, 1 February 1945.
Erimo (襟裳)	Kawasaki-Kōbe Shipyard	3 May 1920	28 October 1920	16 December 1920	Heavily damaged by Dutch submarine O 15, 4 March 1942 and grounded at Belitung.
Sata (佐多)	Yokohama Dock Company	6 March 1920	28 October 1920	24 February 1921	Converted to submarine rescue ship in 1938. Sunk during Operation Desecrate One at Palau, 31 March 1944.
Tsurumi (鶴見)	Ōsaka Iron Works, Sakurajima Factory	10 March 1921	29 September 1921	14 March 1922	Sunk by USS Cero south of Davao 05°53′N 125°41′E, 5 August 1944.
Shiriya (尻矢)	Yokohama Dock Company	7 April 1921	29 September 1921	8 February 1922	Sunk by USS Trigger northeast of Keelung 26°23′N 122°40′E, 22 September 1943.
Irō (石廊)	Ōsaka Iron Works, Sakurajima Factory	2 September 1921	5 August 1922	30 October 1922	Heavily damaged by air raid at Palau, 31 March 1944. Sank, 17 April 1944.

== Photo ==
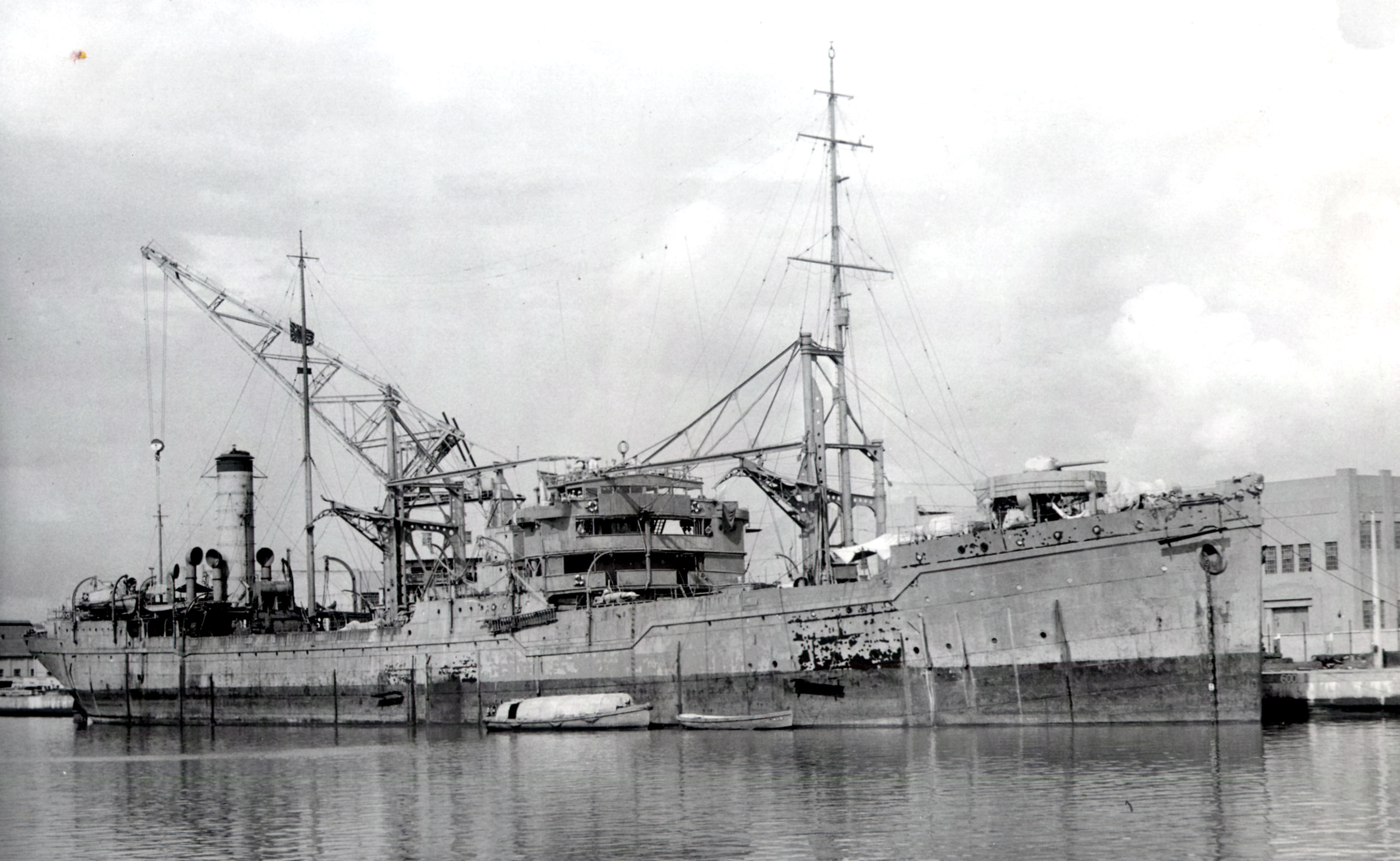
Notoro as seaplane tender on 28 May 1943 at Seletar

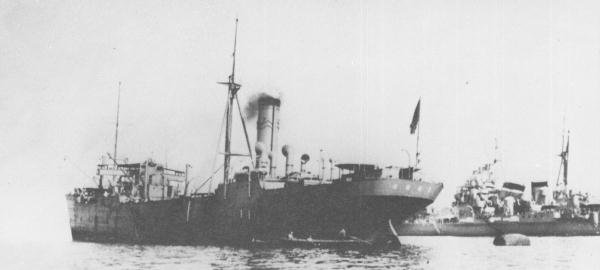
Shiretoko as collier in 1933

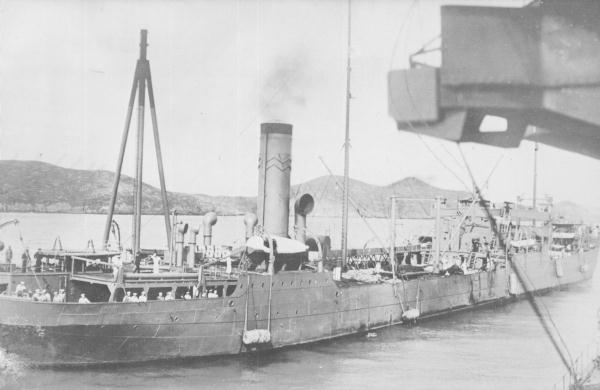
Erimo in 1938

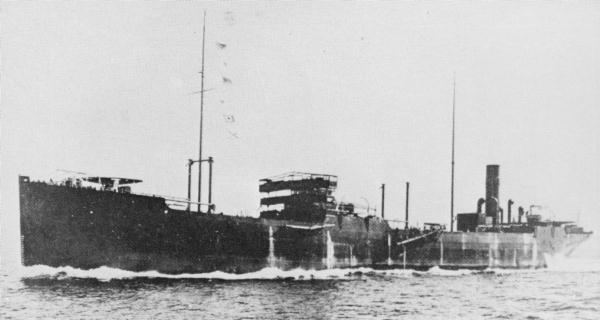
Sata in 1921

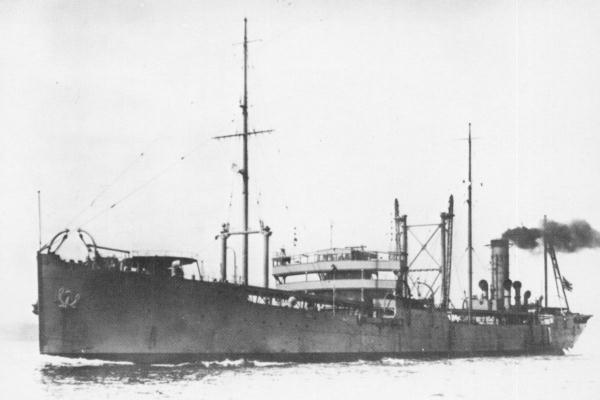
Shiriya on 28 April 1938 at Yokosuka

== See also ==
- Imperial Japanese Navy bases and facilities
- Foreign commerce and shipping of Empire of Japan

== Bibliography ==
- Ships of the World special issue Vol.47, Auxiliary Vessels of the Imperial Japanese Navy, "Kaijinsha". (Japan), March 1997
- The Maru Special, Japanese Naval Vessels No.34 Japanese auxiliary vessels, "Ushio Shobō". (Japan), December 1979
- Senshi Sōsho Vol.31, Naval armaments and war preparation (1), "Until November 1941", Asagumo Simbun (Japan), November 1969
