= Ryusaku Yanagimoto =

Japanese rear admiral

Ryūsaku Yanagimoto
- 柳本 柳作
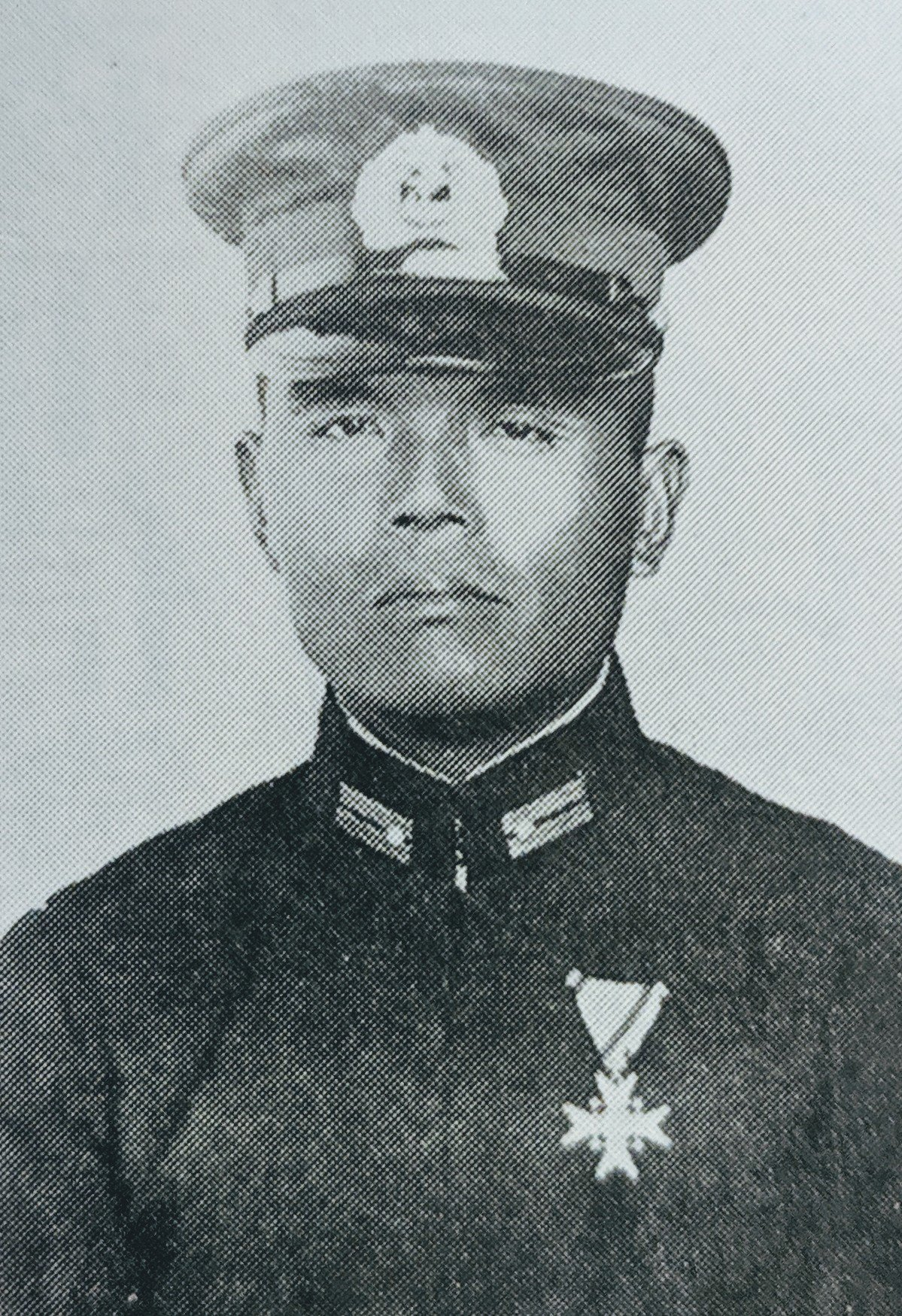
- Born: 9 January 1894; Hirado, Nagasaki, Japan
- Died: 5 June 1942 (aged 48); Pacific Ocean
- Military career
- Allegiance: Empire of Japan
- Branch: Imperial Japanese Navy
- Service years: 1916–1942
- Rank: Rear Admiral (posthumous)
- Commands: Notoro, Sōryū
- Conflicts: World War II; Pacific War; Attack on Pearl Harbor; Battle of Wake Island; Bombing of Darwin; Indian Ocean Raid; Battle of Midway †
- Awards: Order of the Rising Sun, 2nd class

Ryūsaku Yanagimoto (柳本 柳作, Yanagimoto Ryūsaku; 9 January 1894 – 5 June 1942) was captain of the Japanese aircraft carrier Sōryū of the Imperial Japanese Navy during World War II.

== Biography ==
A native of Hirado, Nagasaki Prefecture, The Yanagimoto family were descendants of Shinto priests who had been sent from Ise Jingu to Hirado in the Edo period. He had excellent grades as a child but his family was not wealthy and he had to work as a substitute teacher at his middle school while attending high school.

Yanagimoto graduated from the 44th class of the Imperial Japanese Naval Academy, placing 21st out of 95 cadets in 1916. As a midshipman, he was assigned to the cruiser Tokiwa, which made a long-distance navigational training cruise, visiting Esquimalt and Vancouver in Canada and San Francisco, San Pedro, Honolulu in the United States, Jaluit, Truk, Yap and Angaur in the South Seas Mandate, Hong Kong, and Magong, Keelung and Okinawa in Japan during 1917. On his return, he was assigned to the battleship Kirishima. He served on the cruisers Niitaka in 1918 and Tsugaru in 1919. Promoted to lieutenant in 1919, he subsequently was assigned to the battleship Katori in 1920, followed by Ise in 1921. After attending advanced gunnery school, he was appointed chief gunnery officer on the Asakaze in December 1923.

Yanagimoto graduated from the 25th class of the Naval Staff College in 1925, fifth out of a class of 20. He was promoted to lieutenant commander in December 1928, when he was assigned to serve as Vice Chief Gunnery officer on the battleship Hiei. In September 1929, he was assigned to the staff of Yokosuka Naval District and from February 1930 was assigned to the personnel department of the Navy Ministry.

In May 1933 Yanagimoto was sent to the United Kingdom as a military attaché and promoted to commander later the same year. Seconded to the Imperial Japanese Navy Technical Department, he was part of the Japanese delegation at the Second London Naval Treaty negotiations in 1934. He was ordered to return to Japan in May 1935. He then served in a number of staff assignments within the Imperial Japanese Navy General Staff. In December 1937, he received his first command: the auxiliary seaplane tender Notoro.

He returned to administrative positions within the Imperial Japanese Navy General Staff from November 1938. He was involved in the negotiations which led to the Tripartite Pact, which conversely he was vocally opposed to. He was also an early proponent of the use of radar technology, and severely criticized Admiral Shigeyoshi Inoue and other members of the senior naval staff for their "old-fashioned thinking" and inability to grasp the importance of the new technology.

On 6 October 1941, Yanagimoto was given command of the aircraft carrier Sōryū, on which he participated in the attack on Pearl Harbor in the opening stages of the Pacific War. He was subsequently at the Battle of Wake Island and the Indian Ocean raids. Yanagimoto chose to go down with his ship when Sōryū was sunk by United States Navy aircraft at the Battle of Midway, despite the efforts of his crew to convince him to leave the burning bridge. He was posthumously promoted to the rank of rear admiral and awarded the Order of the Rising Sun, 2nd class.

== Decorations ==
- 1943 – Order of the Rising Sun, 2nd class
