= Japanese icebreaker Ōtomari =

Imperial Japanese Navy icebreaker

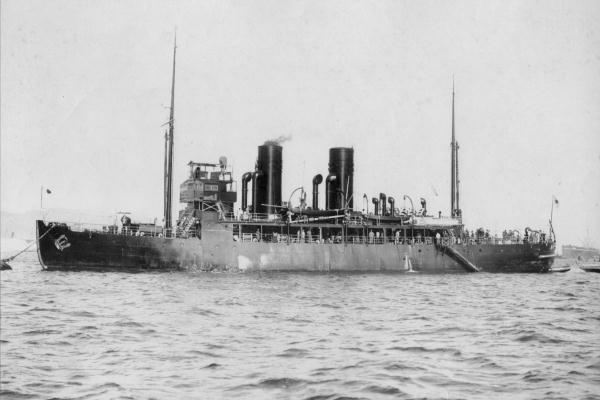
- Ōtomari in November 1921 at Kōbe

History

Japan
- Name: Ōtomari
- Namesake: Port of Ōtomari
- Ordered: 1920 Fiscal year under the Eight-eight fleet plan
- Builder: Kawasaki Shipbuilding Corporation
- Laid down: 24 June 1921
- Launched: 3 October 1921
- Completed: 7 November 1921
- Decommissioned: 15 September 1945
- Fate: Scrapped between October 1949–March 1950.

General characteristics as built
- Type: Icebreaker
- Displacement: 2,330 long tons (2,367 t) standard
- Length: 60.96 m (200.0 ft) pp
- Beam: 15.24 m (50 ft 0 in)
- Draught: 5.55 m (18 ft 3 in)
- Propulsion: 2 × triple expansion reciprocating engines, 5 × scotch boilers; 2 shafts, 4,000 shp
- Speed: 13 knots (15 mph; 24 km/h)
- Range: 4,000 nmi (7,400 km) at 14 knots
- Endurance: Fuel: 500 tons coal
- Complement: 101
- Armament: as built; 1 × Armstrong 3 in L/40 gun; In the Pacific War; 1 × Armstrong 3 in L/40 gun; 2 × Type 96 25 mm AA guns; 6 × Type 93 13 mm AA guns; some depth charges

The Ōtomari (大泊) was an icebreaker of the Imperial Japanese Navy (IJN) serving during the 1920s through World War II, the only ship of her class. She was the only icebreaker warship in the IJN.

== Background ==
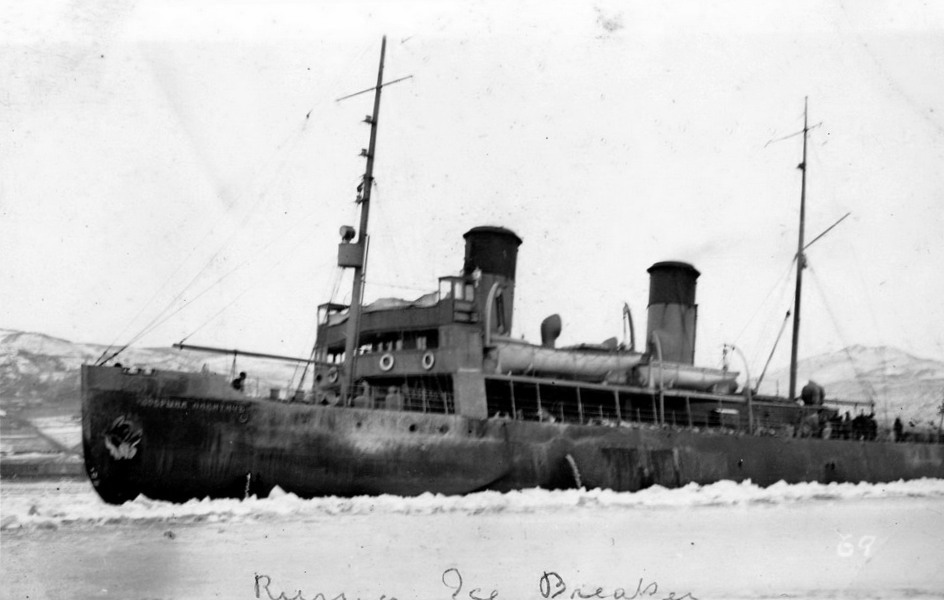
Russian icebreaker Dobrynya Nikitich

Ōtomari was planned as one of the Kamoi-class oilers under the Eight-eight fleet plan at first. The Nikolayevsk Incident (12 March 1920 – 3 June 1920) changed the plan. The Imperial Japanese Navy was not able to dispatch their warship to Nikolayevsk-on-Amur which froze, because they did not have an icebreaker. Japanese civilians were killed by Bolshevik terrorists in this incident. Japan was afraid that this disaster could occur again, because the Russian Civil War continued. As a result, the budget for the vessels was rearranged: only the lead ship of Kamoi-class oiler was built, plus three oilers of Ondo-class, one food supply ship (Mamiya), and one icebreaker (Ōtomari).

As Japan had no prior experience in building icebreakers, the IJN began by observing icebreaker architectures of neighboring countries, and decided to base Ōtomari on the Russian icebreaker Dobrynya Nikitich. The IJN hurried the construction of Otomari, because they wanted her by the Winter of 1921, and she was launched less than four months after her keel was laid down.

She was assigned to Ōminato Guard District and took northern patrol duties, and continued active service throughout her life.

Because Ōtomari was small and aging by World War II, the IJN planned her succeeding ship Esan (恵山, Project Number J23, 6,800 tons standard) under the Kai-Maru 5 program in 1942; however Esan was canceled in 1943.

== Service ==
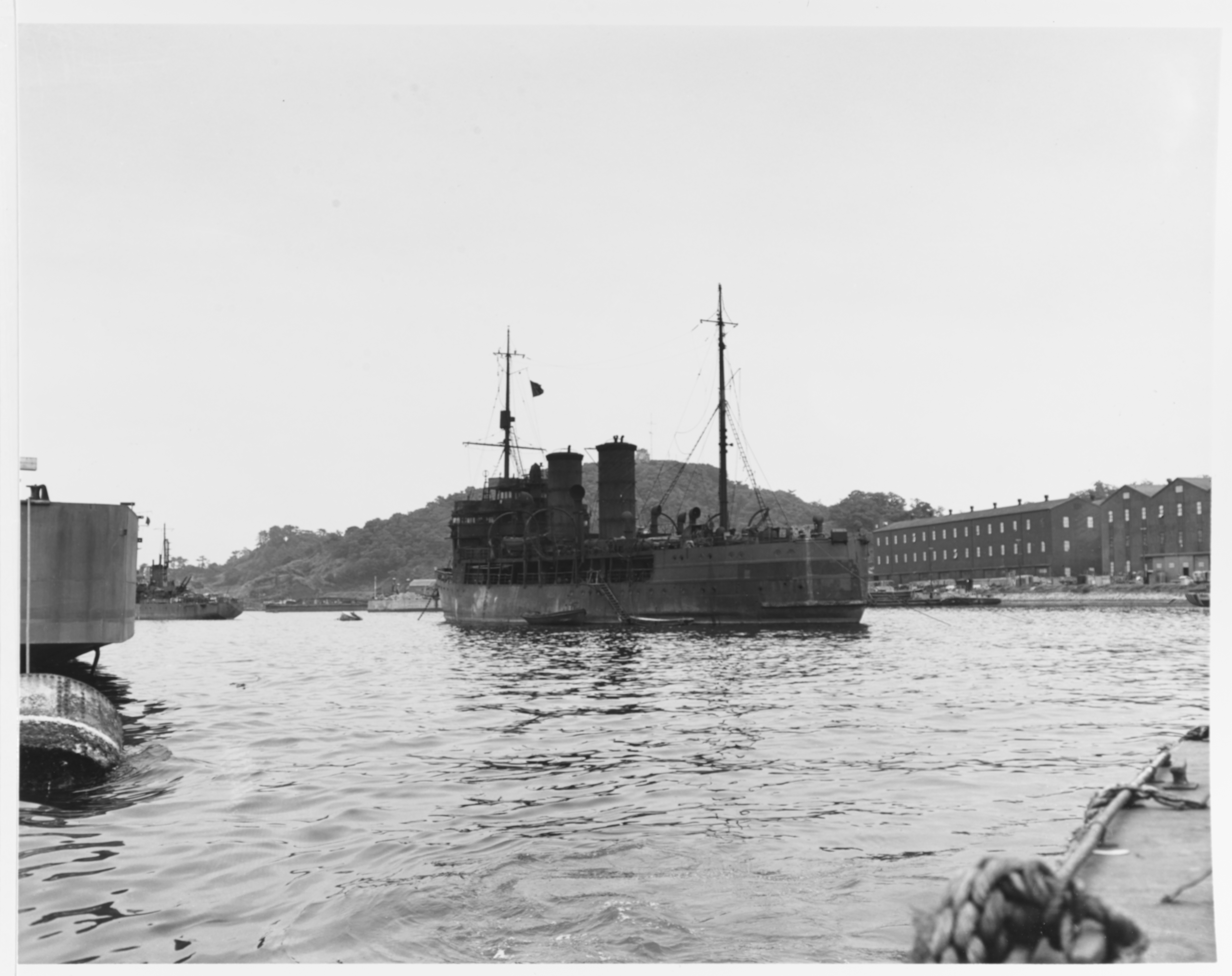
Ōtomari in Yokosuka naval base on 7 September 1945, just after the surrender.

Ōtomari acted in Sakhalin, Kuril Islands and Sea of Okhotsk except during maintenance. In July 1945, she sailed to Yokosuka Naval Arsenal for maintenance. However, she was not able to take maintenance because Japan had surrendered. Japan was going to employ her as repatriation transport, however, it was given up, because her boiler was worn out. She was scrapped in March 1950.

== Bibliography ==
- Ships of the World special issue Vol.47 Auxiliary Vessels of the Imperial Japanese Navy, Kaijinsha, (Japan), March 1997
- The Maru Special, Japanese Naval Vessels No.34, "Japanese Auxiliary vessels", Ushio Shobō (Japan), December 1979
- The Maru Special, Japanese Naval Operations in WWII No.111, "Imperial Japanese Naval Vessels in postwar", Ushio Shobō (Japan), May 1986
- Senshi Sōsho Vol.31, Naval armaments and war preparation (1), "Until November 1941", Asagumo Simbun (Japan), November 1969
- "Rekishi Gunzō". History of Pacific War Vol.37, "Support vessels of the Imperial Japanese Army and Navy", Gakken (Japan), June 2002, ISBN 4-05-602780-3
