= Otomari =

Odomari or Otomari may refer to:

- Ōdomari, former name of Korsakov town in Sakhalin Oblast, Russia
- Japanese icebreaker Ōtomari, of the Imperial Japanese Navy
