= USS Tuna (SS-203) =

Submarine of the United States

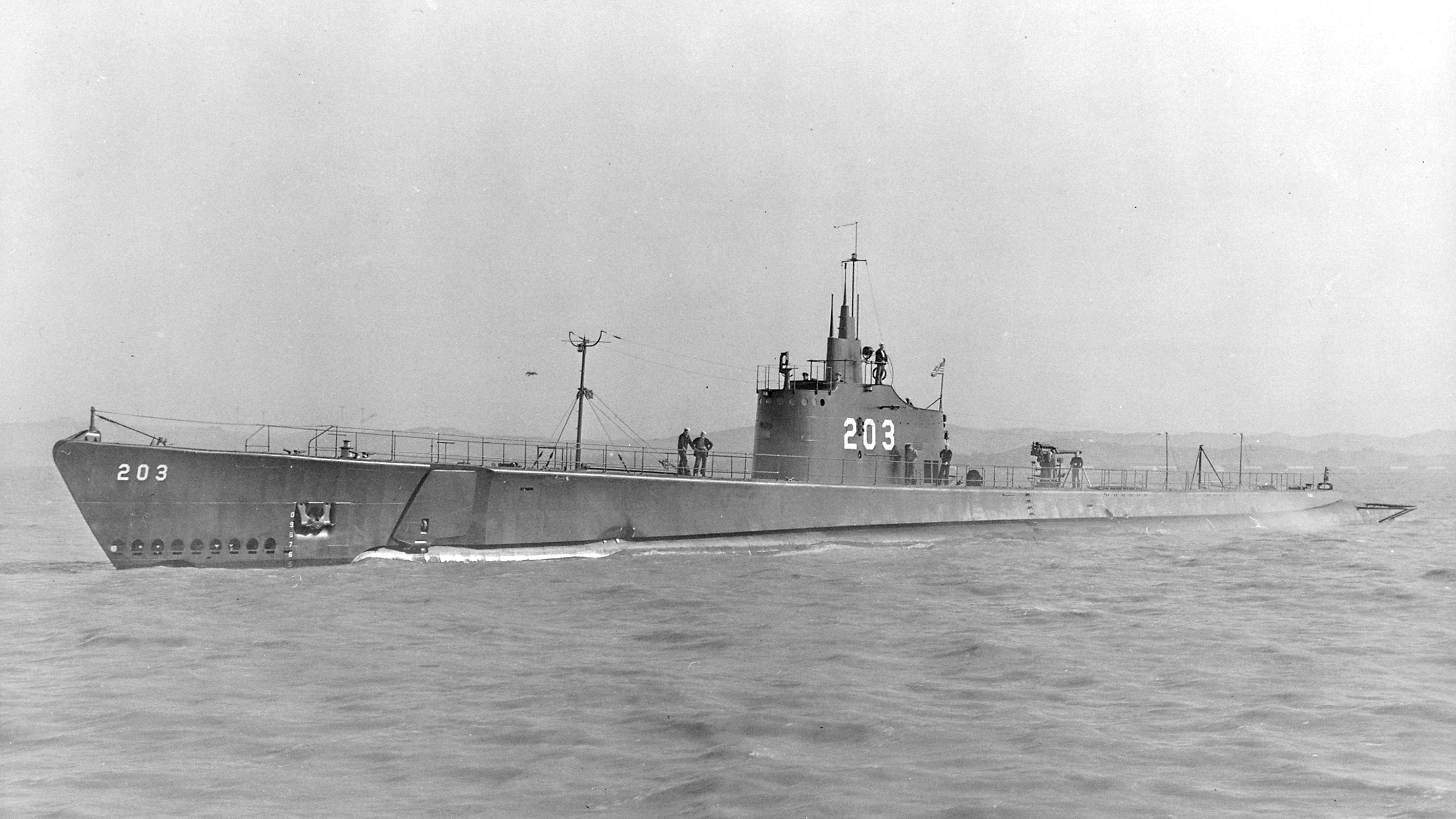
- USS Tuna underway in San Francisco Bay on 10 March 1941.

History

United States
- Name: Tuna
- Namesake: Tuna
- Builder: Mare Island Naval Shipyard
- Laid down: 19 July 1939
- Launched: 2 October 1940
- Commissioned: 2 January 1941
- Decommissioned: 11 December 1946
- Stricken: 21 October 1948
- Fate: Used as target for Operation Crossroads atomic bomb tests, then scuttled off southern California 24 September 1948

General characteristics
- Class & type: Tambor-class diesel-electric submarine
- Displacement: 1,475 long tons (1,499 t) standard, surfaced; 2,370 long tons (2,410 t) submerged
- Length: 307 ft 2 in (93.62 m)
- Beam: 27 ft 3 in (8.31 m)
- Draft: 14 ft 7 1/2 in (4.458 m)
- Propulsion: 4 × Fairbanks-Morse Model 38D8-⅛ 9-cylinder opposed piston diesel engines driving electrical generators; 2 × 126-cell Sargo batteries; 4 × high-speed General Electric electric motors with reduction gears; two propellers; 5,400 shp (4.0 MW) surfaced; 2,740 shp (2.0 MW) submerged
- Speed: 20.4 knots (38 km/h) surfaced; 8.75 knots (16 km/h) submerged
- Range: 11,000 nautical miles (20,000 km) at 10 knots (19 km/h)
- Endurance: 48 hours at 2 knots (3.7 km/h) submerged
- Test depth: 250 ft (76 m)
- Complement: 6 officers, 54 enlisted
- Armament: 10 × 21-inch (533 mm) torpedo tubes; 6 forward, 4 aft; 24 torpedoes; 1 × 3-inch (76 mm) / 50 caliber deck gun; Bofors 40 mm and Oerlikon 20 mm cannon

USS Tuna (SS-203) was a United States Navy Tambor-class submarine, serving in the Pacific during World War II and earning seven battle stars for her service. After the war, she participated in the Bikini Atoll atomic testing in 1946.

Tuna was the second ship of the U.S. Navy to be named for the tuna, a vigorous, spiny-finned fish highly esteemed for sport and food.

== Construction and commissioning ==
Tuna's keel was laid down on 19 July 1939 by the Mare Island Navy Yard at Vallejo, California. She was launched on 2 October 1940, sponsored by Mrs. Wilhelm L. Friedell, and commissioned on 2 January 1941.

== Pre-World War II ==
Tuna departed San Diego, California, on 19 May 1941 for Pearl Harbor, Hawaii, and shakedown training. Operations in Hawaiian waters revealed that her torpedo tubes were misaligned. This problem necessitated her returning to the Mare Island Navy Yard for repairs.

== Wartime operations ==
During the Japanese attack on Pearl Harbor on 7 December 1941, Tuna lay in drydock at Mare Island. She set out for Pearl Harbor on 7 January 1942.

=== Initial patrols ===
The first of Tuna’s 13 war patrols lasted from 26 January to 21 March 1942, as she roved the waters of the East China Sea. On 4 March off Kyūshū, sank one enemy freighter of about 6,000 tons, damaged and probably sunk one enemy destroyer, and damaged two other ships of undetermined type of about 2,000 tons each.

Standing out of Pearl Harbor on 14 April, Tuna once again set her course towards the Japanese home islands and the hunting off Honshū. She added another score to her tally by sinking the 805-ton cargo ship Toyohara Maru on 15 May before returning to Pearl Harbor on 16 June.

Following refit, Tuna became Task Unit 8.5.12, with orders to proceed to the Aleutian Islands. This third war patrol commenced on 13 July, but her only contact with the Japanese came on 9 August, when Tuna sighted a Japanese I-boat on the surface. She lost it shortly thereafter in heavy weather. Later in the month, she supported the Army occupation of Adak Island by transporting a colonel and six enlisted men from Dutch Harbor, Alaska, to Kuluk Bay between 25 August and 27 August. She returned to Pearl Harbor on 5 September.

=== Patrolling New Guinea waters ===
After routine overhaul, Tuna set out from Pearl Harbor on 9 November. She made only one contact during her fourth war patrol, firing two torpedoes at a Japanese destroyer operating off New Georgia Island on 12 December. Both missed their mark. Three days after Christmas 1942, Tuna arrived at her new base, Brisbane, Australia.

Setting out again on 18 January 1943 to begin patrol number five, she arrived in waters off the east coast of Vella LaVella six days later. Expending 16 torpedoes in five futile daylight attacks, Tuna pressed home determined forays only to be driven deep by intense enemy antisubmarine countermeasures. Kept on station between New Ireland and Buka after 11 February, Tuna launched further attacks – but from excessive ranges – which only resulted in still more frustration for her crew. Dispatched next to interdict traffic from reinforcing Vila Plantation and Munda, Tuna remained luckless and was forced deep and endured depth-charge attacks before ending the patrol on 7 February.

After refitting at Brisbane, Tuna set out on her sixth war patrol on 4 March to take up a position in the Bismarck Archipelago, off Lyra Reef, on the northeast side of New Ireland. En route, she patrolled west of Bougainville. On 16 March, she received orders to shift her position to a point southeast of a line between Mussau Island and Manus Island in the Admiralty Islands. Late in the afternoon of 29 March, she sighted a convoy of four merchantmen, with two escort ships and two aircraft. After stalking the convoy all night, Tuna attacked the following morning, firing three torpedoes at the largest vessel. Two hits, and the 4697-ton Kurohime Maru plunged to the bottom.

On 4 April, Tuna changed patrol zones, prowling now to the northwest of the Manus-Mussau line in the East Caroline Basin on the traffic lanes to Rabaul. After no further attack opportunities developed, Tuna returned to Brisbane on 20 April.

On 19 May, en route to her war patrol station for the seventh patrol, Tuna came under attack by a Japanese submarine which fired one torpedo at the American ship before breaking off the attack. After that brush with destruction, Tuna prepared to bombard Wakde Island with her deck guns, but the presence of Japanese subchasers forced a change in plans.

=== Friendly fire ===
On 29 July 1943, as Tuna set out from Brisbane on her eighth patrol, a Royal Australian Air Force Catalina flying boat patrol bomber attacked her, dropping four depth charges close aboard while Tuna was in the Solomon Sea 80 nautical miles (150 km; 92 mi) east-northeast of Kiriwina Island and north of Woodlark Island at 08°02′N 152°07′E. After Tuna crash-dived, the depth charges exploded as she passed a depth between 70 feet (21 m) and 110 feet (34 m), and she plunged to a depth of 365 feet (111 m) before her crew regained control of her. She surfaced with a port list of 18 degrees. The damage she sustained necessitated 17 days of major repairs at Brisbane, delaying her departure for her eighth war patrol until 21 August. Once on station for that patrol, two attack opportunities presented themselves, but neither one bore fruit.

Arriving back at Fremantle on 14 October, Tuna refitted alongside submarine tender Pelias before proceeding on her ninth patrol which commenced on 7 November. After transiting the Molucca Strait, Tuna prowled in the Java Sea and Flores Sea. Attacking a freighter in a rain squall on 21 November, Tuna launched four torpedoes, but only one hit the enemy merchantman. On 12 December, the submarine had better luck. The 5484-ton cargo ship Tosei Maru fell victim to her torpedoes, becoming the largest kill in Tuna’s war career to date.

Following her ninth patrol, Tuna proceeded across the Pacific to Hunters Point Navy Yard in California, where she arrived on 6 April 1944 for a major overhaul. After refitting, she returned to Hawaii to begin her tenth war patrol. Departing Pearl Harbor on 24 April, she surveilled the Palau Islands.

=== The Takima Maru ===
On 4 May 1944, Tuna sighted a 100-ton trawler. Bound for Wake Island with classified documents on board, Takima Maru put up a fight when taken under fire by the submarine's two 20-millimeter guns. In the face of the returned fire, Tuna opened up with her three-inch deck gun and scored a hit on the first salvo, holing Takima Maru near the stern. Ten minutes later, the trawler settled beneath the waves, stern first, leaving the waters littered with secret papers and the surviving Japanese.

Meanwhile, submarine USS Haddock (SS-231) arrived on the scene and assisted in the pickup of confidential documents and prisoners. Each submarine picked up 30 documents; Tuna fished out three prisoners, one of whom died later. The two remaining prisoners were transferred to Haddock. Tuna lost her senior enlisted man, the Chief of the Boat, who was swept overboard and drowned while recovering material from the sea.

Ten days later, Tuna bombarded the phosphate works on Fais Island with 24 rounds from her deck gun. After the remainder of her patrol proved fruitless, the submarine returned to the Marshall Islands arriving at Majuro Atoll on 21 June.

=== Final war patrols ===
After commencing her 11th patrol upon departing Majuro Atoll on 15 July 1944, Tuna roamed the sea lanes of the Japanese home islands, off Shikoku and Kyūshū. Her radar picked up tempting targets, but bad luck continued to dog the ship's efforts to make contact and launch attacks. On occasion, the superior surface speed of the hunted enabled it to easily outrun the hunter, and good antisubmarine measures by the Japanese escort ships forced Tuna to proceed cautiously. On 5 September, she arrived at Pearl Harbor empty-handed.

Following refit, Tuna departed Pearl Harbor on 8 October, bound for the western Pacific. In conjunction with Operation "King Two," the invasion and liberation of the Philippines, Tuna operated in a wolf pack, "Roach's Raiders," in company with Haddock and Halibut. During this 12th patrol, Tuna contacted seven ships; but made only one unsuccessful attack before arriving at Saipan on 2 December.

Tuna’s final war patrol began on 6 January as she left Saipan to take position off the west coast of Borneo. From 28 January to 30 January 1945, Tuna conducted a special mission, reconnoitering the northeast coast of Borneo. She did not attempt a landing due to enemy activity. From 2 March to 4 March, Tuna accomplished her second special mission of the patrol, landing personnel and 4,400 pounds (2,000 kg) of stores near Labuk Bay. During the patrol, she sighted no contacts deemed worthy of torpedo fire, and Tuna returned to Fremantle on 13 March 1945.

== Post-war assignments ==
Thereafter, based at Fremantle, Tuna operated on training duty until she sailed for Leyte in the Philippines on 13 April. The submarine touched at Subic Bay and Saipan before returning to Pearl Harbor on 5 September. From there, she proceeded to San Francisco, California, arriving on 14 September.

After moving through the Panama Canal to the East Coast, Tuna remained in commission, in the inactive fleet, to assist in the maintenance and security of other submarines sent to Portsmouth, New Hampshire, for tests. In this capacity, she served with Submarine Division 162, Submarine Squadron 16, Inactive Fleet, New London Group, until she was selected as a target vessel for the upcoming atomic bomb tests at Bikini Atoll in the Marshall Islands.

== Atomic testing ==
After once again transiting the Panama Canal, Tuna arrived at Pearl Harbor on 2 March 1946 and reported for duty with Commander, Joint Task Force 1. In company with submarines Skipjack, Skate, and Searaven, Tuna departed Pearl Harbor on 21 May 1946.

Upon her arrival at Bikini Atoll, nine days later, Tuna was assigned a place among the target vessels anchored in the atoll. The first atomic bomb was detonated on 1 July 1946, and the second followed 24 days later. Receiving only superficial damage, Tuna departed for Kwajalein on 22 August 1946 en route to Pearl Harbor and the West Coast. On 5 September, she arrived in Hawaiian waters, mooring at the submarine base.

== Decommissioning ==
Underway for the United States West Coast on 7 October 1946, Tuna arrived at the Mare Island Naval Shipyard a week later where she moored with the 19th Fleet. Scheduled for decommissioning on 11 December 1946, she was retained as a radiological laboratory unit and subjected to numerous radiological and structural studies while remaining at Mare Island. No preservation work was undertaken on the ship, and she was decommissioned on 11 December 1946. On 20 September 1948, fleet ocean tug Tekesta towed Tuna from Mare Island for the submarine's "last patrol." On 24 September 1948, Tuna was sunk in 1,160 fathoms (6,960 ft; 2,120 m) of water in the Pacific Ocean off the U.S. West Coast. She was struck from the Naval Vessel Register on 21 October 1948.
