= Japanese oiler Irō =

Fleet oiler for the Imperial Japanese Navy

History

Japan
- Name: Irō
- Builder: Osaka Iron Works, Sakurajima
- Laid down: 2 September 1921
- Launched: 5 August 1922
- Completed: 30 October 1922
- Fate: Damaged by air raid, 31 March 1944. Sank, 17 April 1944.

General characteristics
- Class & type: Notoro-class replenishment oiler
- Displacement: 15,400 long tons (15,647 t)
- Length: 138.68 m (455 ft 0 in) p/p
- Beam: 17.68 m (58 ft 0 in)
- Draught: 8.08 m (26 ft 6 in)
- Propulsion: 1 × triple expansion reciprocating engine; 4 × Kampon water tube boilers; 1 shaft; 3,750 hp (2,796 kW)
- Speed: 12 knots (22 km/h; 14 mph)
- Capacity: 8,000 tons of oil
- Complement: 157
- Armament: 2 × 120 mm (4.7 in) L/45 naval guns; 2 × 76.2 mm (3.00 in) L/40 AA guns

Irō (石廊) was a fleet oiler for the Imperial Japanese Navy. A member of the Notoro class of oilers, the ship was launched on August 5, 1922, and served Japan during the Pacific Campaign of World War II. On March 31, 1944, the ship was attacked and sunk in Palau Harbor by United States Navy aircraft carrier aircraft from the Fast Carrier Task Force during Operation Desecrate One.

In March 2015 a PRC flag was discovered tied to the wreckage. The flag was subsequently removed and president of Palau Tommy Remengesau stated that he was "extremely disappointed".
