= USS Haddock (SS-231) =

Submarine of the United States

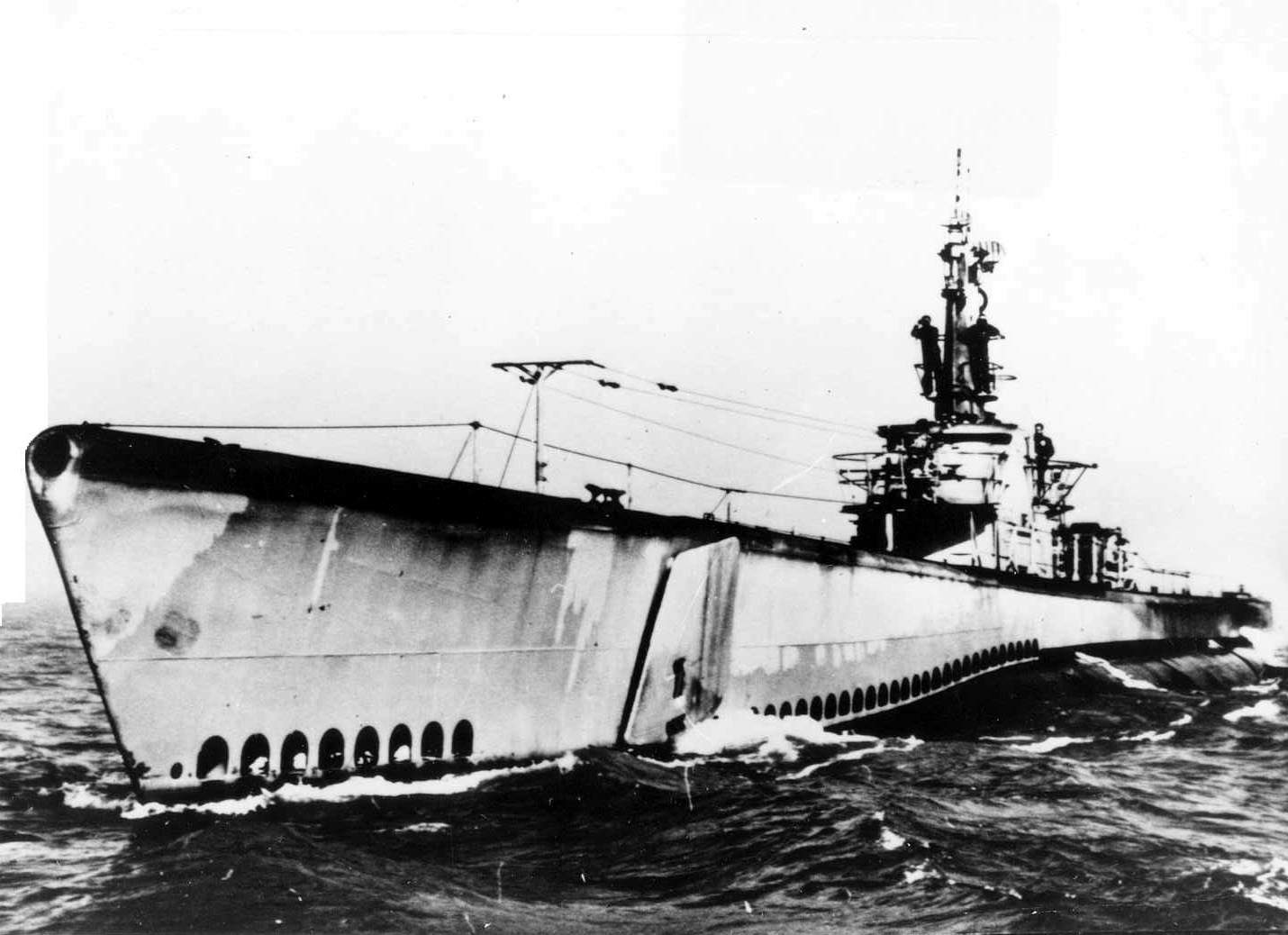
- USS Haddock

History

United States
- Builder: Portsmouth Naval Shipyard, Kittery, Maine
- Laid down: 31 March 1941
- Launched: 20 October 1941
- Sponsored by: Mrs. William H. Allen
- Commissioned: 14 March 1942
- Decommissioned: 12 February 1947
- Stricken: 1 June 1960
- Fate: Sold for scrap, 23 August 1960

General characteristics
- Class & type: Gato-class diesel-electric submarine
- Displacement: 1,525 long tons (1,549 t) surfaced; 2,424 long tons (2,463 t) submerged
- Length: 311 ft 9 in (95.02 m)
- Beam: 27 ft 3 in (8.31 m)
- Draft: 17 ft (5.2 m) maximum
- Propulsion: 4 × Fairbanks-Morse Model 38D8-1/8 9-cylinder opposed-piston diesel engines driving electrical generators; 2 × 126-cell Sargo batteries; 4 × high-speed Elliott electric motors with reduction gears; 2 × propellers; 5,400 shp (4.0 MW) surfaced; 2,740 shp (2.04 MW) submerged
- Speed: 21 knots (39 km/h) surfaced; 9 kn (17 km/h) submerged
- Range: 11,000 nmi (20,000 km) surfaced at 10 kn (19 km/h)
- Endurance: 48 hours at 2 kn (4 km/h) submerged; 75 days on patrol
- Test depth: 300 ft (90 m)
- Complement: 6 officers, 54 enlisted
- Armament: 10 × 21-inch (533 mm) torpedo tubes; 6 forward, 4 aft; 24 torpedoes; 1 × 3-inch (76 mm) / 50 caliber deck gun; Bofors 40 mm and Oerlikon 20 mm cannon

USS Haddock (SS-231), a Gato-class submarine, was the second submarine of the United States Navy to be named for the haddock, a small edible Atlantic fish related to the cod. A previous submarine had been named Haddock (SS-32), but was renamed K-1 prior to her launching, so Haddock (SS-231) was the first to actually bear the name.

== Construction and commissioning ==
Haddock (SS-231) was laid down at the Portsmouth Navy Yard in Kittery, Maine, on 31 March 1941. She was launched on 20 October 1941, sponsored by Mrs. William H. Allen, and commissioned on 14 March 1942, Lieutenant Commander Arthur H. Taylor (United States Naval Academy Class of 1927) in command.

== First war patrol, July – September 1942 ==
After shakedown and training cruises off New England, Haddock sailed for the Pacific on 19 June 1942 and arrived Pearl Harbor 16 July. She departed on her first war patrol on 28 July, the first submarine to do so with the new SJ radar. This equipment added greatly to her power in seeking out and destroying enemy ships in darkness or reduced visibility.

Penetrating into the Bonin Islands–East China Sea area, Haddock attacked a freighter on the surface on 22 August, sinking troop transport Tatsuho Maru (6334 tons). Tatsuho Maru had suffered engine trouble and had fallen back; being left behind by her convoy making her easy prey for the new boat and crew. Haddock put a torpedo into her port side #4 hold where 10,000 gallons of aviation gasoline was stored. This caught fire and exploded. The ensuing damage took Tatsuho Maru down by the stern in five minutes, taking 26 passengers and 12 crewmen with her. In the Formosa Straits on 26 August Haddock fired four stern shots at Teishun Maru (formally Vichy French Tai Seun Hong) but missed; the submarine swung around to bring her bow tubes to bear and sent the 2251 ton cargo ship to the bottom. Haddock patrolled off Okinawa before returning to Midway 19 September 1942.

== Second, third, and fourth war patrols, October 1942 – April 1943 ==
Haddock's second war patrol, commencing 11 October from Midway, was carried out in the Yellow Sea. After two attacks without hits, the submarine torpedoed Tekkai Maru (1925 tons) amidships on 3 November, breaking her in two. She was forced to break off another attack on 6 November after damaging the IJA converted troop transport French Maru (5828 tons) because of destroyers and search aircraft, but during the night of 11–12 November blew off the stern of cargo ship Venice Maru (6571 tons) east of the island of Honshū. Haddock damaged another ship on Friday 13 November, only to be prevented from finishing her off by escort craft, and she expended her last torpedo on Nichinan Maru (6503 tons) on 16 November. After a brief gunfire duel with her victim (the merchantman sunk later that day), the submarine headed for Pearl Harbor, arriving on 4 December.

Haddock departed Pearl Harbor on 28 December on her third war patrol, this time to the oceans south of Japan. She was attacked by two destroyers raining depth charges, and when she finally surfaced to clear the area, Haddock found herself surrounded by Japanese patrol craft. The submarine sped out of the trap just in time to avoid destruction.

A few days later, 17 January 1943, she sank an unidentified/uncredited freighter of 4,000 tons, and on 19 January Haddock detected six cargo vessels steaming in double column. Gaining attack position on the last ship, she scored two hits and sent her to the bottom. Aerial attack and depth charges kept her from bagging the other members of the convoy and bad weather forced Haddock to return to Midway on 17 February.

Haddock cleared Midway on 11 March for her fourth war patrol, and saw her first action on 3 April off Palau, when she encountered the converted fleet oiler Arima Maru (7, 389 tons) fully loaded with 7, 880 tons of heavy oil, protected by a corvette (postwar analysis identified the escort as the destroyer Yūzuki.) The submarine launched one torpedo at the corvette, but the torpedo apparently ran under without exploding. Haddock then turned her attention to the tanker and succeeded in sinking her with a spread of three torpedoes. Following the torpedo tracks, the corvette dropped 24 depth charges, many directly over Haddock, causing her to lose buoyancy and she descended to 415 ft. The attack also damaged her conning tower and radar system. The following day she was ordered to terminate her patrol early due to the severity of the damage, and she returned to Pearl Harbor on 19 April 1943.

== Fifth, sixth, and seventh war patrols, June – November 1943 ==
Setting out from Pearl Harbor again on 30 June, Haddock set course for the Caroline Islands on her fifth war patrol. Detecting a group of four escorted transports north of Palau on 21 July, she maneuvered into position and sank Saipan Maru (5532 tons). The depth charge attacks of the accompanying ships were ineffective. That same day Haddock came upon two unescorted tankers. Her first attack failed to sink the two ships, but she followed the ships and made two more attacks before finally breaking off the action for lack of torpedoes. Haddock arrived at Midway on 6 August and at Pearl Harbor four days later.

Haddock's sixth war patrol was conducted in waters off Truk, the vital Japanese base in the Carolines. Departing Pearl Harbor on 2 September, she torpedoed the collier; Samsei Maru (641tons) on 15 September but failed to sink her, and the victim turned to ram the submarine. Haddock damaged the auxiliary tanker Notoro (14,050 tons) on 20 September forcing the tanker to return to Truk at reduced speed along with her 8000 tons of oil originally destined for Japan herself. The next day she torpedoed and damaged the Japanese collier Shinyubari Maru (5354 tons) and then spent a harrowing day eluding the attacks of Japanese escort vessels alerted by the explosions. She returned to Midway on 28 September with all torpedoes expended.

The veteran submarine departed on her seventh war patrol on 20 October 1943 and headed again for the waters off Truk. Late on 1 November, Haddock attacked the Japanese cable-layer Tateishi and trawler Kitagami Maru without success, barely surviving the attacks of a hunter-killer group a few hours later. She made one additional attack on 6 November heavily damaging fleet tanker Hoyo Maru (8691 tons) with a torpedo into the stern temporarily forcing her abandonment, before returning to Pearl Harbor on 15 November 1943.

== Eighth and ninth war patrols, December 1943 – May 1944 ==
For her eighth war patrol Haddock joined a coordinated attack group with Tullibee and Halibut. She departed Pearl Harbor on 14 December and rendezvoused on 17 December. Encountering a group of warships on 19 January, Haddock attacked escort carrier Un'yō (17830 tons) and damaged her severely with at least two hits before being driven off by the carrier's screening vessels. The submarine returned to Pearl Harbor on 5 February 1944.

Haddock departed for her ninth war patrol 10 March. Under the USN's relentless attack, spearheaded by the submarines, Japan's sea lifelines had shrunk to a trickle and targets were scarce, but Haddock succeeded in sinking auxiliary minesweeper Noshiro Maru No.2 (126 tons) on 17 April, before returning to Pearl Harbor on 10 May 1944.

== Tenth and eleventh war patrols, October 1944 – March 1945 ==
Her tenth war patrol was eventful as the Pacific war drew close to its climax. With Commander Roach in Haddock commanding, she formed an attack group with Halibut and Tuna, departing Pearl Harbor on 8 October. Moving to support the invasion of the Philippines, the submarines were present during the battle off Cape Engaño, part of the epochal Battle for Leyte Gulf, on 25 October and unsuccessfully pursued some of the retiring Japanese units. Bothered by a malfunctioning periscope, Haddock scored no hits on the rest of her patrol and returned to Pearl Harbor on 10 December.

Fitted out with extra deck guns for her eleventh war patrol, Haddock sailed in company with submarines Sennet and Lagarto for the seas east of Japan. The boats made a diversionary sweep designed to pull early warning craft away from the intended track of a carrier group en route for air strikes against Tokyo. Gaining their objective with complete success, the submarines attacked the picket boats with gunfire, allowed them to send contact reports, and then sank several, diverting Japanese efforts away from the undetected carrier group. Haddock returned to Guam on 14 March 1945.

== Last war patrols, April – August 1945 ==
Haddock spent her twelfth and thirteenth war patrols on lifeguard station near Tokyo, standing by to rescue downed airmen after raids on Japanese cities. This duty occupied her from April until her return to Pearl Harbor on 22 August.

Haddock departed for the East Coast of the United States on 7 September and after transiting the Panama Canal and visiting various ports on the East Coast, arrived at New London, Conn., on 29 March 1946, nearly four years after she had sailed from the North Atlantic to victory. She was placed in reserve in commission on 20 April and decommissioned on 12 February 1947. In August 1948 Haddock was assigned duty as a reserve training ship for 6th Naval District, and served in that capacity until being again placed out of service at New London in May 1952. She was again assigned to reserve training, this time at Portsmouth, N.H., June 1956, and finally was struck from the Naval Vessel Register and sold for scrap to Jacob Checkoway on 23 August 1960. Checkoway used the large stock of oil onboard the vessel to start Checkoway Oil Company, and two of her four Fairbanks-Morse diesel engines are in service at the University of Notre Dame as backup generators.

Haddock received 11 battle stars for her service in World War II. All of her war patrols except the twelfth were designated successful and she received the Presidential Unit Citation for her outstanding performance on the second, fifth, sixth, and seventh war patrols.
