= Philip H. Ross =

Philip Harold Ross
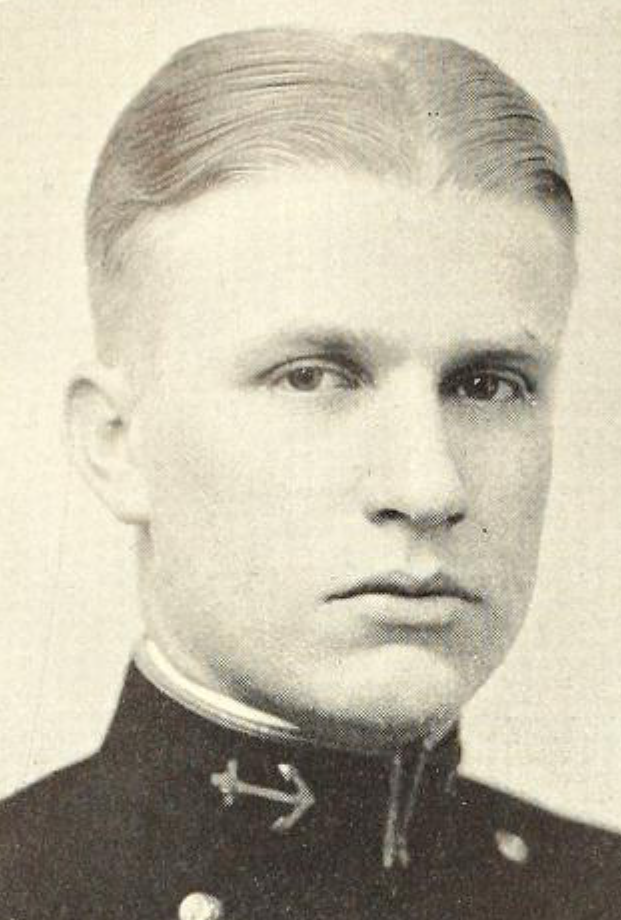
- Born: December 19, 1905; Kenai, Alaska
- Died: January 8, 1981 (aged 75); Annapolis, Maryland, U.S.
- Burial place: United States Naval Academy Cemetery
- Alma mater: United States Naval Academy
- Spouse: Helen Louise Jones
- Military career
- Allegiance: United States of America
- Branch: United States Navy
- Service years: 1927-1957
- Rank: Rear admiral
- Service number: 0-61247
- Commands: USS S-46 (SS-157); USS S-11 (SS-116); USS Halibut (SS-232); USS Golet; Submarine Division 302; Submarine Division 102; USS Chemung (AO-30); USS Virgo (AKA-20)
- Conflicts: World War II
- Awards: Navy Cross (2)

Philip Harold Ross (19 December 1905 – 8 January 1981), was a decorated submarine commander during World War II who reached the rank of rear admiral in the United States Navy.

Admiral Philip Ross graduated from the United States Naval Academy with the class of 1927. After receiving his commission, he became qualified on submarines, and in 1942 became qualified for command. He became the commander of the USS Halibut upon its commissioning 10 April 1942. His first two war patrols were unsuccessful. However, on his third war patrol he sank 30,280 tons of Japanese shipping and damaged an additional 8,000 tons, and was awarded the Navy Cross. On his next war patrol, Ross sank 15,100 tons of Japanese shipping and damaged another 15,000 tons, for which he was awarded his second Navy Cross. These successful war patrols were reported in the media as an example of the success American submarines were having against the Japanese, and even gave him the nickname "Deadeye Phil." Ross retired from the U.S. Navy in 1957 after 30 years of service as a rear admiral.
