= USS Halibut (SS-232) =

Submarine of the United States

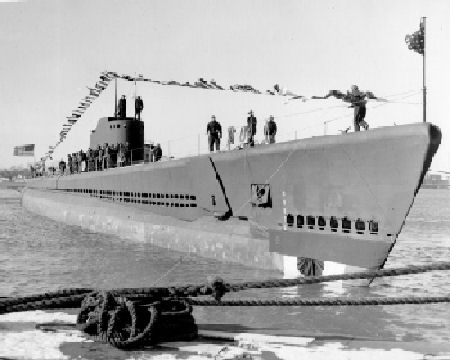
- Halibut on the Piscataqua River at Portsmouth Navy Yard, Kittery, Maine, on 3 December 1941, just after her launching. She is dressed overall.

History

United States
- Name: Halibut
- Builder: Portsmouth Naval Shipyard, Kittery, Maine
- Laid down: 16 May 1941
- Launched: 3 December 1941
- Sponsored by: Mrs. P. T. Blackburn
- Commissioned: 10 April 1942
- Decommissioned: 18 July 1945
- Stricken: 8 May 1946
- Fate: Sold for scrap, 9 December 1946

General characteristics
- Class & type: Gato-class diesel-electric submarine
- Displacement: 1,525 long tons (1,549 t) surfaced; 2,424 long tons (2,463 t) submerged
- Length: 311 ft 9 in (95.02 m)
- Beam: 27 ft 3 in (8.31 m)
- Draft: 17 ft (5.2 m) maximum
- Propulsion: 4 × Fairbanks-Morse Model 38D8-1/8 9-cylinder opposed-piston diesel engines driving electrical generators; 2 × 126-cell Sargo batteries; 4 × high-speed Elliott electric motors with reduction gears; 2 × propellers; 5,400 shp (4.0 MW) surfaced; 2,740 shp (2.04 MW) submerged
- Speed: 21 knots (39 km/h) surfaced; 9 kn (17 km/h) submerged
- Range: 11,000 nautical miles (20,000 km) surfaced at 10 kn (19 km/h)
- Endurance: 48 hours at 2 kn (3.7 km/h) submerged; 75 days on patrol
- Test depth: 300 ft (90 m)
- Complement: 6 officers, 54 enlisted
- Armament: 10 × 21-inch (533 mm) torpedo tubes; 6 forward, 4 aft; 24 torpedoes; 1 × 4-inch (102 mm) / 50 caliber deck gun; Bofors 40 mm and Oerlikon 20 mm cannon

USS Halibut (SS-232), a Gato-class submarine, was the first ship of the United States Navy to be named for the halibut, a large species of flatfish.

== Construction and commissioning ==
Halibut′s keel was laid down by the Portsmouth Navy Yard at Kittery, Maine on 16 May 1941. She was launched on 3 December 1941, sponsored by Mrs. P. T. Blackburn, and commissioned on 10 April 1942 with Commander Philip H. Ross in command.

== War patrols ==
=== First and second patrols ===
Halibut completed her outfitting and shakedown cruise 23 June 1942 and departed for the Pacific, arriving Pearl Harbor on 27 June. She departed Hawaii 9 August for the Aleutian Islands area for her first patrol. After searching Chichagof Harbor and the waters off Kiska Island, the submarine engaged in an indecisive gunnery duel with a freighter on 23 August. Finding few targets, she terminated her patrol at Dutch Harbor on 23 September.

Her second patrol was also off the Aleutians. She departed Dutch Harbor on 2 October 1942 and surfaced for a torpedo attack on what appeared to be a large freighter on 11 October. The ship, a decoy (Q-ship) equipped with concealed guns and torpedo tubes, attacked Halibut with high-explosive shells and a torpedo as the submarine took radical evasive action to escape the trap. After eluding her assailant she returned to Dutch Harbor on 23 October and Pearl Harbor on 31 October 1942.

=== Third and fourth patrols ===
Halibut departed Pearl Harbor 22 November 1942 for her third war patrol, off the northeast coast of Japan. She began stalking a convoy the night of 9 December and early the next morning closed for the attack. A hit amidships damaged the Japanese troop transport Uyo Maru (6,376 tons); Halibut put two torpedoes squarely into the cargo ship Gyokusan Maru (1,970 tons), sinking her on 12 December. On 16 December Halibut made two more attacks sinking the cargo ship Shingo Maru (4,740 tons) and running the cargo ship Genzan Maru (5,708 tons) aground, wrecking her and forcing her abandonment. Each ship was fully laden with war materials destined for Japan. She returned to Pearl Harbor on 15 January 1943.

The submarine sailed from Pearl Harbor again on 8 February 1943 on her fourth war patrol. Heading for the Japan-Kwajalein shipping lanes, she tracked a freighter the morning of 20 February and closed to sink troop transport Shinkoku Maru (3,991 tons) that night. While northeast of Truk on 3 March, she detected the naval auxiliary Nichiyu Maru (6,818 tons) and attacked, but was driven off by the fire of deck guns. (Nichiyu Maru reached Apra harbor under tow, but was deemed beyond repair and was consequently broken up.) Halibut terminated this patrol in Pearl Harbor 30 March.

=== Fifth patrol ===
Halibut began her fifth war patrol 10 June and made for the waters around Truk. She made her first attack 23 June. No hits were scored and the submarine was forced to wait out a severe depth charge attack. Halibut detected, tracked, and attacked a convoy bound for Truk from Kisarazu, Japan, putting a single torpedo (out of a spread of six) into the side of IJN troop transport Aikoku Maru (10,437 tons). Aikoku Maru was transporting ground personnel and equipment of the 201st NAG and suffered among its casualties 21 men. Halibut also attacked the escort carrier Un'yō on 10 July while escorting the same convoy, and finally returned to Midway Island on 28 July 1943. No tonnage credit was given in the contemporaneous record or the postwar JANAC accounting, however. (Credit for the damage to the carrier was awarded to USS Steelhead attacking later that same day.)

=== Sixth patrol ===
Ignatius J. "Pete" Galantin assumed command 11 August, and Halibut set out on her sixth patrol on 20 August. Together with Searaven and Pompano, she cruised towards her assigned patrol zone off the east coasts of Honshū and Hokkaido, including the Tsugaru Strait. On 29 August, she sighted a freighter with a Shigure-class escort; two torpedo attacks on the destroyer failed and Halibut was forced deep for eight hours to avoid the 43 depth charges expended by the destroyer and a second vessel. The attackers lost contact with Halibut in the early evening, allowing her to move away and resurface. The following day the sub headed into Iburi Wan; she sighted one convoy but was unable to close, but later sank the 6,581-ton freighter Taibun Maru, with three bow shots. Two small patrol boats saw the sinking and dropped 24 depth charges after Halibut, which escaped by unintentionally passing through a minefield.

After some days of poor weather, Halibut entered the approaches to the Tsugaru Strait. Firing on a freighter found by radar in foggy conditions, she expended six torpedoes with no results. Returning to the coast between Erimo Saki and Muroran, she closed on a radar contact around dawn on 6 September. The contact, the heavily loaded freighter Shogen Maru (3,362 tons), was sighted and sunk with four torpedoes. That night Halibut made radar contact with a vessel identified as a destroyer but later found to be the light cruiser Nachi, firing the submarine's remaining aft torpedoes in a rough sea for no hits. (One torpedo actually hit but was a dud.) With only one torpedo remaining, she began her return trip to Midway on 7 September after eleven days in enemy waters. That night she traced radio transmissions to a small sampan she sank with her deck guns. Halibut stopped briefly at Midway for fuel and food before sailing to a full refit at Pearl Harbor, arriving on 16 September.

During her time refitting, Halibut was used for torpedo testing, firing torpedoes from her stern tubes into the cliffs at Kahoolawe – stern firing was a precaution against erratic or circular running torpedoes. Earlier tests had shown that one in three Mark 14 torpedoes failed to explode on impact; the crushing deformed the contact exploder before it could detonate the firing caps. The modified versions, made from Japanese aircraft propellers, that were tested by Halibut were almost three times better in testing (6 out of 7 detonations) and even more efficient in action. A short time later, while performing underwater training, Halibut was accidentally struck by a destroyer; the glancing blow damaged both periscopes (an incident which in peacetime would warrant a board of inquiry). The damage was repaired in hours, and there were no other repercussions.

=== Seventh patrol ===
Halibut sailed from Pearl Harbor on her seventh war patrol on 10 October 1943, headed for the approaches to the Bungo Suido. She reached Midway after four days travel and stopped briefly to top up her fuel tanks (having consumed 14,000 gallons already) and to repair a defective motor-generator for her new SJ radar. She reached Okinoshima on 25 October and quickly found her daylight activities constrained by a heavy fishing sampan presence. Over the early morning of 29 October she detected, tracked, and closed on a freighter and small anti-submarine warfare escort. Halibut was detected and the escort drove her off and held her at bay with fifteen depth charge attacks as the freighter fled. Resurfacing, a lookout noticed the smoke of a distant convoy. The submarine closed as the daylight faded, coming close enough to submerge for periscope observation on the morning of 1 November. The convoy consisted of seven freighters and three Ōtori-type torpedo boats as escorts. Halibut launched three torpedoes from 6,500 yards (5,900 m) at 06:52 and made no hits; the freighters turned away and two torpedo boats closed but were ineffective in locating the submarine. Around midday, Halibut headed south after the convoy, surfacing as night fell. She was detecting curious 'friendly' radar interference as, unknown to her, Seahorse and Trigger were also chasing the convoy (sinking two ships each from the convoy as Halibut closed).

On the morning of 2 November Halibut caught up with two straggling freighters from the convoy. She launched three torpedoes at Ehime Maru (4,653 tons) at 28-18N, 134-48E. Two torpedoes hit, but the sinking vessel bravely turned towards the submarine, forcing her to evade and lose range on the second freighter. (She would later sink taking her entire crew of 84 souls with her.) Halibut launched three torpedoes at long range but made no hits. She surfaced to increase her speed, but the freighter revealed she was armed with some accurate firing, forcing Halibut back under. The submarine shadowed the freighter and positioned herself for an attack using her stern tubes, firing six torpedoes in rough seas for no hits.

She went on to patrol the approaches to Van Diemen Strait just south of Kagoshima, before returning north when she received an Ultra message indicating a Japanese task force, including an aircraft carrier, near the Bungo Suido. A high-speed race put Halibut into position on the morning of 5 November, and she fired six torpedoes at the carrier (identified at the time as Shōkaku so as to conceal the source of the information; later properly identified as Jun'yō). A single torpedo hit near the ship's rudders, leaving the carrier unable to manoeuvre. When Halibut tried to fire her single remaining stern torpedo, it activated but failed to leave the tube. Halibut dove to more than 350 feet (110 m) to avoid attacks from three destroyer escorts; in the event, only thirteen depth charges were dropped. The submarine resurfaced after dark and set course for home, running seven days to Midway and then reaching Pearl Harbor on 17 November after thirty-eight days on patrol, a round trip of 8,327 miles (13,401 km), of which only 1,957 miles (3,149 km) were actually 'on station'.

=== Eighth patrol ===
On her eighth war patrol (beginning at Pearl Harbor on 14 December) Halibut formed a coordinated attack group, or "wolf pack", with Haddock and Tullibee. All three commanders were intensively trained for the patrol at 'Convoy College' at Pearl Harbor. The very first USN wolf pack had left Midway on 1 October 1943 – Cero, Shad, and Grayback claimed five ships sunk and eight damaged (post-war analysis indicated only three sinkings). Halibut was part of the third wolf pack.

The group's journey to the patrol area around the Mariana Islands was marked by very rough seas and gale force winds. On 26 December Halibut was attacked by an aircraft; three bombs were dropped but the submarine took no damage. The group reached its target area on 29 December, but over the following weeks made only fleeting, poor contacts with enemy vessels, including a missed contact with the battleship Yamato on 11 January (the battleship detected the search radars of the submarines and completely outmaneuvered them as daylight ended). A few days later they failed to sink an Asashio-class destroyer and were subjected to twenty-two depth charges. On 17 January Halibut broke from the wolf pack to return to Midway as her fuel reserves were depleted (both the other vessels were using their #4 ballast tank to store fuel and had begun the patrol with an extra 24,000 gallons).

Operating independently, Halibut patrolled Port Apra and Tanapag Harbor on her way home, observing a Katori-class cruiser near Saipan, and being attacked by aircraft and depth charges on 23 January while attempting a stealthy approach on the Taiyō-class escort carrier Unyō in Garapan Anchorage (the carrier had already been damaged by Haddock). Halibut was forced down to 405 feet (123 m) to avoid her attackers, and spent over thirteen hours submerged. She reached Midway on 1 February 1944 where she suffered storm damage to her ballast tanks while moored.

=== Ninth patrol ===
Halibut departed on her ninth war patrol 21 March 1944, her patrol area was off Okinawa, a 90 mi (140 km) by 250 mi (400 km) island-filled area called Nansei Shoto. Cruising between Amami O Shima and Tokuno Shima late on 12 April, the submarine encountered several enemy vessels outbound from Kagoshima, Kyushu for Naha, Okinawa; following them northwards, she spotted a south-bound freighter with three small escorts. She launched three torpedoes; one struck Taichu Maru (3,213 tons) squarely amidships and she quickly sank. The three escorts dropped eighteen depth charges, which did little more than test the newly fitted depth charge indicator. The sinking alerted the Japanese, and both sea and air anti-submarine patrols were intensified in the area, preventing Halibut from operating successfully for the next two weeks even as she expanded her patrol into the East China Sea.

Finally, on 26 April, the submarine found some action. She passed between Iheya Retto and Okinawa Jima in the very early morning of 26 April and detected three freighters with escorts. She closed the range over several hours and fired six torpedoes from 3,000 yards (2,700 m), three each at two freighters. Two hit and the convoy was scattered. Halibut eluded the escorts and returned to the attack around dawn. Closing in on a ship separated from the group, she sank Genbu Maru with two torpedoes. Very soon afterwards she detected a small vessel using sonar and fired from 900 yards (820 m) to sink the coastal minelayer Kanome. The submarine was then forced into evasive action as a bomber arrived overhead; the aircraft and two patrol boats dropped some ninety depth charges without ever endangering Halibut. Later, off the northeastern shore of Kume Shima on 29 April, she fired fifty shells from her 4-inch deck gun at two warehouses and other buildings.

On 1 May she spotted a compact group of eighteen 250-ton sampans while east of Okinawa and trailed them southwards; after dusk she surfaced and closed the range to attack with her deck armaments from 1,000 yards (910 m). Two sampans exploded violently but return fire and flying debris injured three of Halibut's crew – one seriously. With concerns for the injured man, the sub left her patrol zone a day early to return to Midway. She rendezvoused with Perch after six days travel, and a fully qualified doctor from Midway aboard the second sub was transferred to Halibut by boat.

When Halibut reached Midway on 11 May, it was decided to leave the injured man aboard and carry on to Pearl Harbor, which she reached on 15 May 1944. Again it was decided to leave the injured man aboard rather than risk moving him, and the submarine was refueled and restored before heading on to a major overhaul at the ship repair basin of Bethlehem Steel at Sixteenth Street in south San Francisco, California, with ninety days rest for the crew. She reached that port on 24 May and finally, after twenty-one days in his bunk, the injured man was transferred to a land hospital – Oak Knoll Naval Hospital. During her major overhaul, Halibut had some small changes. An automatic plotting table was added; the main electric power control cubicle was given shock-mountings; there was a new, more powerful, trim pump; another passive sonar set; and the 20 mm deck gun was replaced with a 40 mm rapid-fire gun. After testing, the submarine returned to Pearl Harbor on 20 September 1944, where Galantin received a promotion to commander.

=== Tenth patrol ===
On her tenth war patrol Halibut again joined a coordinated attack group, this time with Haddock and Tuna, under the overall command of John P. Roach. Halibut was given a loadout of the newer all-electric Mark 18 torpedo. The group departed Pearl on 8 October, bypassing Midway and taking a 3,650-mile (5,870 km) great circle route towards Tanapag, Saipan, which had been captured in June. The group replenished their stores there and after two days departed on 21 October to head for the patrol zone around the strait between Formosa and Luzon.

The group reached the Luzon Strait on 25 October, but mid-morning the submarines were ordered to set up scouting lines to intercept units of the Japanese fleet retiring after the Battle off Cape Engaño. Spread out east-west 30 nautical miles (56 km) apart, the submarines moved rapidly until enemy ships (heavily engaged by USN dive bombers) were detected around 17:30. Halibut and the other subs had encountered the remnants of Admiral Jisaburo Ozawa's force. She submerged at 17:45 while some 30,000 yards (27,000 m) away from a vessel she identified as the battleship Yamashiro (later found to be Ise). At 18:43 she fired six torpedoes from 3,400 yards (3,100 m). While the torpedoes were en route, a maneuver by the Japanese vessels brought an escort into their path and a destroyer was sunk. JANAC later identified the sunken vessel as Akizuki, but Galantin states that it was more likely Hatsuzuki, as Japanese records list the Akizuki being sunk by aerial attack earlier in the day. Even Hatsuzuki is unlikely, usually credited as having been sunk by a US cruiser-destroyer group. An hour after the attack, Halibut resurfaced and headed north chasing a radar contact, which she lost in the early morning of 26 October.

The submarine returned to the Luzon Strait, where she found the variable currents in the two main channels (Bashi Channel and Balintang Channel) made keeping trim very tricky. On 28 October she was attacked with no effect (beyond a little fright for her lookouts) by an anti-submarine aircraft. For the next two weeks, in constantly poor weather, Halibut found no enemy shipping except the hospital ship Hikawa Maru, which could not be attacked.

On 13 November Halibut noticed increasing air anti-submarine activity. In the early morning of 14 November she entered the Bashi Channel and around noon she detected a northbound convoy of four freighters with escorts. The submarine launched four torpedoes from 3,100 yards (2,800 m). As Halibut submerged and turned away, the crew heard a "loud, fast buzzing noise" which was quickly followed by five explosions (apparently jikitanchiki-equipped Mitsubishi G3M aircraft). The submarine went down to 325 feet (99 m) as she detected the sonar of two escorts when a sudden near explosion severely damaged the conning tower, which had been abandoned. The escort was CD-6, which was alerted by the aircraft of the sub's location. This blast was followed by another series of very close explosions which damaged equipment in the control room and yet another series of blasts over the forward battery compartment that damaged the torpedo room, forward battery room, and the main air bank, "one of the most devastating [attacks] of the war". The attacks drove Halibut down to 420 feet (130 m); as air pressure rose to 52 psi (360 kPa) the crew were forced to seal off the afflicted section and slowly release the pressure into the rest of the ship.

No further attacks occurred and Halibut was able to move sluggishly up to around 300 feet (91 m), her nominal test depth. The crew toiled with repairs, and when night came she resurfaced and headed towards her sister ships. The radar was repaired, although Halibut was without depth gauges, main compasses, gyros, radio, and a number of other systems. Most of the damage was actually to the hull and its fittings. At around 21:30 she encountered Pintado of the wolf pack that was working to the north of Halibut. After transferring a message to COMSUBPAC Pintado was ordered to escort Halibut the entire 1,500 miles (2,400 km) to Saipan. Halibut made a single brief dive during the journey; this was the last time she was ever submerged. At noon on 19 November she entered Tanapag Harbor.

The gallant submarine received the Navy Unit Commendation for her performance on this patrol. However, as a result of this action, damages incurred on her meant that she could no longer patrol for the rest of the war.

== Fate ==
Halibut arrived at Pearl Harbor on 1 December. It was quickly determined that her damage was too extensive to justify repair and thus was a constructive total loss. She was sent to New London, where she could be used as an alongside school ship. Her command was transferred to Guy Gugliotta and she left Pearl Harbor on 5 December arriving at San Francisco on 12 December.

She sailed 16 February 1945 for Portsmouth, New Hampshire. She was decommissioned 18 July 1945 and was sold for $23,123 (currently $333,405) as scrap on 10 January 1947 to Quaker Shipyard and Machinery Company of Camden, New Jersey.

Halibut received seven battle stars for World War II service. She had steamed over 110,000 miles (180,000 km), sunk twelve ships and damaged at least nine others. War patrols 3 through 7, 9 and 10 were designated successful.

== Legacy ==
The battle flag of Halibut, along with photos of her crew and other artifacts, can be seen at the USS Bowfin Submarine Museum and park, next to the USS Arizona Memorial Visitor Center in Pearl Harbor, Hawaii.
