= USS Tullibee (SS-284) =

Gato-class submarine

Coordinates: 9°30′N 134°45′E

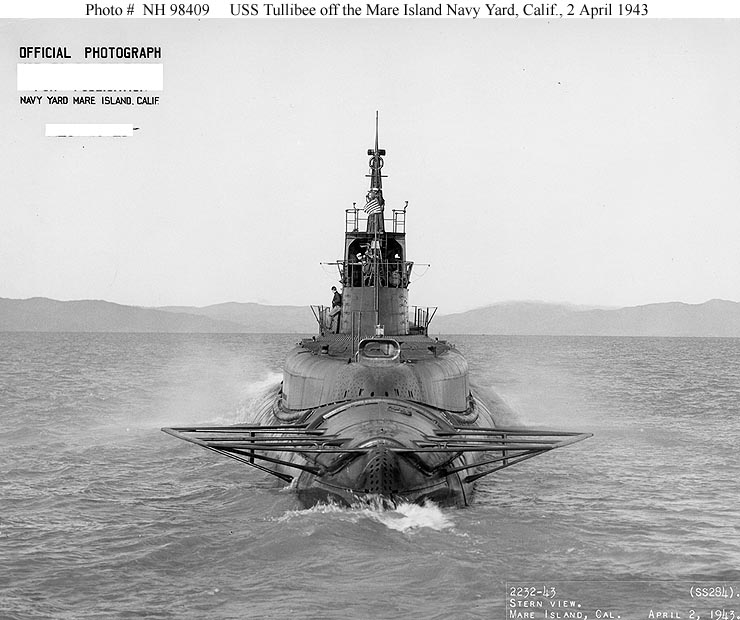
- USS Tullibee (SS-284), off the coast of Mare Island, California.

History

United States
- Name: USS Tullibee
- Namesake: Tullibee
- Builder: Mare Island Naval Shipyard
- Laid down: 1 April 1942
- Launched: 11 November 1942
- Sponsored by: Mrs. Kenneth C. Hurd
- Commissioned: 15 February 1943
- Stricken: 29 July 1944
- Fate: Sunk by own torpedo north of Palau, 26 March 1944

General characteristics
- Class & type: Gato-class diesel-electric submarine
- Displacement: 1,525 long tons (1,549 t) surfaced; 2,424 long tons (2,463 t) submerged
- Length: 311 ft 9 in (95.02 m)
- Beam: 27 ft 3 in (8.31 m)
- Draft: 17 ft 0 in (5.18 m) maximum
- Propulsion: 4 × Fairbanks-Morse Model 38D8-⅛ 9-cylinder opposed piston diesel engines driving electrical generators; 2 × 126-cell Sargo batteries; 4 × high-speed General Electric electric motors with reduction gears; two propellers; 5,400 shp (4.0 MW) surfaced; 2,740 shp (2.0 MW) submerged
- Speed: 21 kn (24 mph; 39 km/h) surfaced; 9 kn (10 mph; 17 km/h) submerged
- Range: 11,000 nmi (13,000 mi; 20,000 km) surfaced at 10 kn (12 mph; 19 km/h)
- Endurance: 48 hours at 2 kn (2.3 mph; 3.7 km/h) submerged; 75 days on patrol
- Test depth: 300 ft (91 m)
- Complement: 6 officers, 54 enlisted
- Armament: 10 × 21-inch (533 mm) torpedo tubes; 6 forward, 4 aft; 24 torpedoes; 1 × 4-inch (102 mm) / 50 caliber deck gun; Bofors 40 mm and Oerlikon 20 mm cannon

USS Tullibee (SS-284), a Gato-class submarine, was the first ship of the United States Navy to be named for the tullibee. Her keel was laid down on 1 April 1942 at Mare Island, California, by the Mare Island Navy Yard. She was launched on 11 November 1942 sponsored by Mrs. Kenneth C. Hurd; and commissioned on 15 February 1943, Commander Charles Frederic Brindupke in command.

Tullibee held shakedown training from 8–30 April 1943 and departed for Hawaii on 8 May. She arrived at Pearl Harbor on 15 May and held further training exercises in Hawaiian waters. Numerous air fitting leaks developed, and she was docked for repairs twice. When this proved ineffective, the submarine entered the navy yard until 11 July.

Tullibee started her first war patrol on 19 July 1943. She was sunk by one of her own torpedoes on 26 March 1944 while on her fourth patrol. One crew member survived the sinking of Tullibee.

== First war patrol ==
On 19 July, Tullibee got under way for the Western Caroline Islands and her first war patrol. On 28 July, she sighted a passenger-cargo ship, accompanied by an escort and an aircraft that prevented her attack. On 5 August, the submarine began patrolling the Saipan-Truk traffic lanes. Five days later, she sighted smoke on the horizon that proved to be three freighters with an escort. Tullibee closed the range to 2,700 yards (2,500 m); launched one torpedo at the ship on the right and three at the vessel on the left. As the submarine fired the first torpedo, a ship rammed her and bent her number one periscope. She went deep and was depth charged by the escort as the ships sped away. As the torpedoes had been set to run at a depth of 15 feet (4.6 m) – too deep for the draft of the largest target – none of the torpedoes exploded.

On 14 August, Tullibee sighted a convoy of three freighters with an escort and began an end-around run to get into good attack position. She launched a torpedo from a range of 3,000 yards (2,700 m) and went deep. It missed, and she returned to periscope depth to fire three torpedoes at the last ship. It apparently saw their wakes as it turned and combed them. The submarine again went deep. When she surfaced, the targets had escaped. On 22 August, Tullibee sighted a convoy of five ships escorted by two destroyers; closed to 2,000 yards (1,800 m); and launched three torpedoes at the nearest freighter. Two minutes later, she fired three more at another ship. As she went deep to avoid a destroyer heading her way, she heard one explosion. She soon heard the bursts of two more torpedo explosions, followed by breaking up noises. When she surfaced, she sighted over 1000 empty 50 US gal (190 L) oil drums, but no ships. Postwar examination of Japanese records indicated that Tullibee had damaged one freighter and had sunk the passenger-cargo ship Kaisho Maru. The patrol terminated when the submarine reached Midway Island on 6 September.

== Second war patrol ==
On 28 September, Tullibee began her second war patrol. Her assigned area was in the East China Sea between the Ryukyu Islands and the China coast. On 4 October, she sighted a convoy of nine passenger-cargo ships with three destroyer escorts. The submarine pulled well ahead of the convoy and tracked them until the next morning. At 00:58, she fired a spread of three torpedoes at a large freighter, with one hitting the target a minute later. Another spread of three from the bow tubes produced two hits on a heavily laden cargo ship. Minor explosions and breaking up noises began immediately as Chicago Maru sank. Twelve days later, Tullibee contacted a convoy of seven ships with three escorts that later separated into two groups; one hugging the China coast and the other heading for Pescadores Channel. She attacked the largest ship in the latter group with six torpedoes; one hit the target. The submarine began an end-around run and launched four torpedoes at another ship. Two torpedoes soon broached, and Tullibee broke off the attack. She went deep and rigged for silent running to evade the escorts. On 5 November, the submarine was running submerged near Okinoyerabu Shima when she sighted a large, three-story building on the island. She surfaced and fired 55 shells into the barracks before retiring at full speed. She began the voyage back to Hawaii the next day and reached Pearl Harbor, via Midway Island, on 16 November. Her official score for this patrol was one passenger-cargo ship sunk, a tanker damaged, and a passenger-cargo ship damaged.

== Third war patrol ==
Tullibee's third patrol was in a "wolfpack" with sister ships Halibut and Haddock. The trio sortied from Pearl Harbor on 14 December 1943 for the Mariana Islands to intercept enemy shipping plying between Truk and Japan. On 2 January 1944, Tullibee sighted a Japanese I-class submarine on the surface and launched four torpedoes at a range of 3,000 yards (2,700 m). The enemy saw the wakes and combed the four of them as Tullibee was forced deep by an enemy floatplane that dropped six bombs.

On 19 January, Haddock reported that she had damaged the Japanese escort carrier Unyō, which limped to Saipan. Tullibee sighted the carrier there on 25 January, close ashore and well protected by escorts and aircraft. The submarine remained on station for several days awaiting an opportunity to sink the aircraft carrier. However, when she surfaced on 28 January, she learned that the carrier had slipped away. Three days later, the submarine made radar contact with two targets. She launched three torpedoes at what appeared to be a freighter and swung left to fire one at the escort. The first target, net tender Hiro Maru, took two hits and disintegrated in about one minute. The torpedo fired at the escort missed, and the submarine went deep to evade. Tullibee cleared the area the following day and returned to Pearl Harbor on 10 February.

== Fourth war patrol and loss ==
On 5 March, Tullibee stood out of Pearl Harbor to begin her fourth war patrol. Nine days later, she called at Midway Island to top off her fuel and then proceeded to her patrol area in the Palau Islands. She was scheduled to support aircraft carrier strikes against those islands on 30–31 March. On 25 March, Tullibee arrived on station and began patrolling. The next day, off the Palau Islands she made radar contact on a convoy consisting of a large passenger-cargo ship, two medium-sized freighters, a destroyer, and two other escorts. The submarine made several surface runs on the transport but kept losing her in rain squalls. Tullibee finally closed to 3,000 yards (2,700 m) and launched two torpedoes from her bow tubes at the target. About two minutes later, the submarine was rocked by a violent explosion. It was only learned after the war that Tullibee's torpedo had run a circular course and she had sunk herself.

Gunner's Mate Second Class Clifford Weldon Kuykendall, on the bridge at the time, was knocked unconscious and thrown into the water. When he regained consciousness, the submarine was gone. He heard voices in the water for about ten minutes before they stopped. The next day, he was picked up by Japanese destroyer Wakatake. Kuykendall survived as a prisoner of war and was released after V-J Day.

Tullibee received three battle stars for World War II service.

Tullibee was stricken from the Naval Vessel Register on 29 July 1944. As with other US submarines lost at sea, Tullibee was not decommissioned by the U.S. Navy and officially remains on "Eternal Patrol".
