= Japanese seaplane tender Notoro =

Japanese seaplane tender

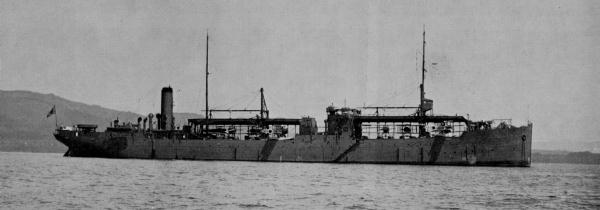
- Notoro as seaplane tender, 1931

History

Empire of Japan
- Name: Notoro
- Namesake: 能登呂, Cape Notoro
- Builder: Kawasaki Shipbuilding Corporation shipyard at Kobe
- Laid down: 24 November 1919
- Launched: 3 May 1920
- Commissioned: 10 August 1920
- Refit: As seaplane tender, June 1924; As oiler, December 1941
- Fate: Scrapped, 1947

General characteristics (as built)
- Class & type: Notoro-class oiler
- Displacement: 15,400 long tons (15,647 t) normal
- Length: 138.68 m (455 ft 0 in) p/p
- Beam: 17.68 m (58 ft 0 in)
- Draught: 8.08 m (26 ft 6 in)
- Propulsion: 1 × triple expansion reciprocating engine; 4 × Scotch boilers; single shaft, 3,750 shp (2,800 kW)
- Speed: 12 knots (22 km/h; 14 mph)
- Capacity: 8,000 tons of fuel oil
- Complement: 142
- Armament: 2 × 120 mm (4.7 in) L/45 naval guns; 2 × 76.2 mm (3 in) L/40 AA guns

General characteristics (as seaplane tender)
- Type: Seaplane carrier
- Displacement: 14,050 long tons (14,280 t) (standard)
- Length: 138.68 m (455 ft 0 in) p/p(143.5 m (470 ft 10 in) waterline length)
- Beam: 17.68 m (58 ft 0 in)
- Draft: 8.08 m (26 ft 6 in)
- Propulsion: 4 × Miyabara steam boilers (c. 1930 replaced by 6 × Miyabara boilers); 2 vertical triple expansion steam engines (Note: According to combinedfleet.com and Nishida: Shiretoko, Notoro had two steam engines. However, according to Nishida: Notoro, Notoro had only one steam engine as a seaplane tender.); 2 propellers, 5,850 shp (4,360 kW) (according to Nishida, indicated power)
- Speed: 12 kn (22 km/h; 14 mph)
- Range: 8,000 nmi (15,000 km; 9,200 mi) at 7 knots (13 km/h; 8.1 mph)
- Complement: 250
- Armament: 2 × 120 mm (4.7 in) L/45 naval guns; 2 × 76.2 mm (3 in) L/40 AA guns
- Aircraft carried: 8 seaplanes (taking off from water)

Notoro (能登呂) was an oiler of the Imperial Japanese Navy commissioned in 1920, which was rebuilt in 1924 into a seaplane tender and in 1941 back into an oiler. She participated in the First Shanghai Incident in 1932 and the Second Sino-Japanese War since 1937. In the fall of 1941, she was rebuilt back into an oiler. On 9 January and 20 September 1943, she was damaged by US Navy submarines but returned to service after repairs. On 29 June 1944, she was hit by two torpedoes launched by submarine USS Flasher. During repairs in Singapore Notoro was again damaged on 5 November 1944, this time by B-29 bombers. No further repairs were made until the end of the war and she was probably scrapped in 1947.

== Designation of airplanes operating from Notoro ==
Aircraft operating from Notoro were marked on the tail with a code, according to the following scheme: [code Notoro] - [tactical number]. The identification code Notoro changed during the service. After her conversion to a seaplane tender, the code was formed by three katakana written characters ノ ト ロ (no to ro). In October 1937, the code was changed to 13. In October 1941 the code was Z1 and in November of that year - just before the conversion back to an oiler - the code was changed to N2 .

== Onboard aircraft complement ==
The number of aircraft up to 1941 was as follows. (The number of aircraft is regular + reserve aircraft)

- 28 June 1927: 4+4 Yokosuka E1Y reconnaissance aircraft
- 8 May 1929: 6+2 Yokosuka E1Y reconnaissance aircraft (1 Yokosuka K1Y trainer fixed on the outside in 1929)
- 25 May 1932: Yokosuka E1Y3 4+2, Yokosuka E5Y reconnaissance seaplane 2+1.
- 1 November 1932: Yokosuka E1Y3, Yokosuka E5Y 3+1.
- 30 January 1933: Yokosuka E1Y3, Yokosuka/Kawanishi E5Y/K 6+2.
- 15 October 1933: Nakajima E4N2 4+1.
- 1 May 1934: E4N2 6+2 (some are E1Y3 reconnaissance aircraft).

After repairs in 1937, she is reported to carry 4 Kawanishi E7K and 4 Nakajima E8N reconnaissance seaplanes.

In July 1941 her aircraft complement was moved to Fujikawa Maru, and Notoro aircraft group was disbanded.

== Notoro's service as a seaplane tender (1924 to 1941) ==
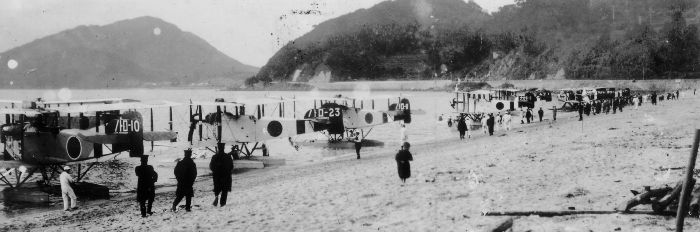
A row of nine Type 14 reconnaissance seaplanes in 1927 on Tonomi Beach (Japanese: 富海), east of Hofu in Yamaguchi Prefecture. The tailcodes of the three seaplanes on the left reveal their affiliation with Notoro. They are from left to right, ノトロ-10, unknown, ノトロ-23 and ノトロ-11.

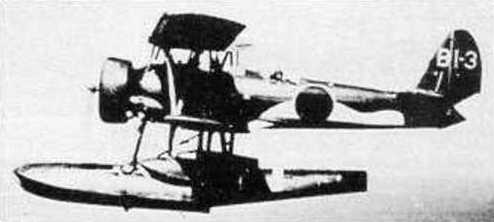
Nakajima E8N seaplanes operated from Notoro during the Second Sino-Japanese War.

Notoro was the second commissioned ship of the Notoro-class oilers. She was completed as an oiler with a carrying capacity of 8,000 tons, but relatively shortly after her commission, it was decided to convert her into a seaplane tender. The refit was completed at the Sasebo Naval Arsenal on 1 June 1924. As a seaplane tender Notoro could carry up to eight (six operational and two dismantled backup machines) three-seater Type 14 reconnaissance seaplanes (later designated Yokosuka E1Y1). Notoro had no catapult: seaplanes took off from the water surface, where they were unloaded by ship cranes. After the refit, Notoro could continue to act as an oiler.

On 1 December 1925 Notoro was assigned to the Combined Fleet.

An explosion occurred on Notoro on 5 September 1931 when she was moored at the Port of Yokohama, causing 10 deaths, destroying aviation fuel tanks and damaging several E1Y1 seaplanes.

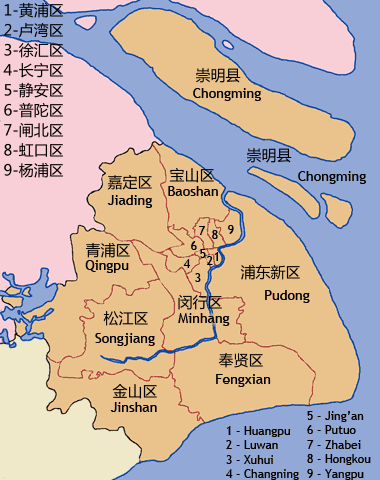
Shanghai administrative divisions. Zháběi district is number 7.

From the beginning of 1932, Notoro participated in operations against China (but initially independent from the Combined Fleet). On 28 January Notoro arrived in Shanghai from the Ryojun naval base. The tense situation in Shanghai that day escalated into the first Shanghai incident. On the night of January 28 and 29, seaplanes from Notoro dropped flares to scare off the Chinese opposition. The next day, Notoro, moored on the Yangtze River, sent several of her E1Y3 seaplanes against targets in Shanghai. Despite the foggy weather, seaplanes attacked targets in Zhabei (simplified Chinese: 闸北; traditional Chinese: 閘北), artillery positions outside the city and an armored train at the Shanghai North railway station (Chinese: 上海北站). However, the raids also claimed civilian casualties, which caused outrage in China.

On 11 May 1932, Notoro was reassigned to the Combined Fleet, and on 25 May the aircraft complement was changed to include three-seater seaplanes E5K / E5Y.

On 2 October 1937 Notoro received the second half of the E8N2 seaplanes from the 23rd Reconnaissance Group, which were delivered to the shores of South China by the submarine tender Taigei.

On 24 February 1938 Notoro was located on the shores of South China Sea. That morning, Notoro sent out five of its E8N2s, to which were added eight E8N2s from Kinugasa Maru to attack Nanxiong (in the northern Guangdong province). Some E8N2 carried bombs and some flew armed only with their machine guns as an escort. Above the target, the E8N faced twelve Gladiator Mk. I of the 28th and 29th zhongdui (Chinese: 中隊; squadron) of the 5th dàduì (Chinese: 大隊; air group/wing) of the Chinese Air Force. E8N proved to be a difficult prey. During the battle, several E8Ns were damaged, with two (including one from Notoro) crashing on the way back with the loss of their crews. Another damaged E8N2 (tailcode 13-1) from Notoro, which was hit a total of 138 times, returned with a dead observer on board and was written off after an emergency landing. Another E8N also returned with a dead crew member. Notoro lost a total of five dead aircrew members and two E8Ns. The Chinese lost two Gladiators (Nos. 2902 and 2808) and their pilots during the battle.

On 24 July 1938, Notoro together with Kamikawa Maru provided air support for Kure's 5th "Kaigun tokubetsu rikusentai" (Japanese: 海軍特別陸戦隊), a Special Naval Landing Forces unit, which landed on the banks of the Yangtze River. Between 12 and 25 October, Notoro together with the seaplane carrier Kamoi and the aircraft carriers Kaga, Sōryū and Ryūjō supported the Japanese offensive in the Guangdong Province, during which Guangzhou fell to the Japanese on 21 October.

== Notoro's service as a tanker (1941 to 1945) ==
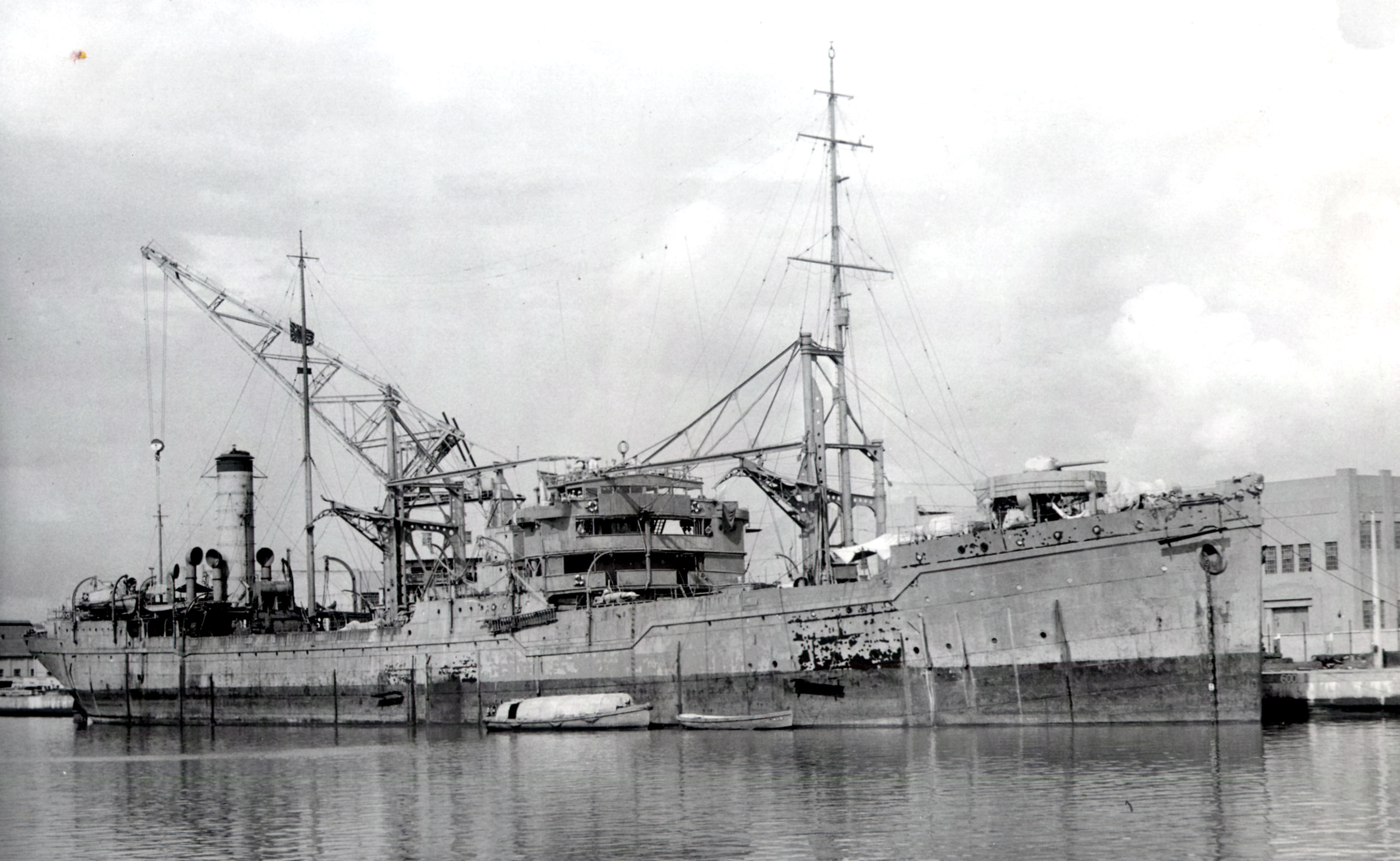
Notoro on 28 March 1943 during repairs in Singapore after the conversion back to a tanker.

The planned invasion of the Southwest Pacific created the need for the Imperial Japanese Navy to transport oil from future occupied territories in the Dutch East Indies to Japan. Notoro was therefore rebuilt back into a tanker in November and December 1941.

During the Pacific War Notoro sailed between Japan and the Japanese bases in the Southwest Pacific and the Indian Ocean. On 9 January 1943 Notoro became the target of a submarine attack by USS Gar in the Makassar Strait, she was hit by at least two of the three fired torpedoes. However, the tanker was able to continue to Balikpapan at Borneo, where the most necessary repairs were made. She then proceeded for further repairs to Singapore where she arrived on 31 January 1943.

On 26 May 1943 she sailed in the convoy No. 4526 from Truk. The convoy was headed for Yokosuka but was attacked on 3 June by the submarine USS Salmon. All seven torpedoes fired by the submarine missed and the convoy arrived in Yokosuka on 5 June.

On 20 September 1943 Notoro sailed from Truk as part of the convoy No. 4920 to Japan. After departing the harbor, at 23:00 hours at 7°23′N 150°11′E west of Truk, Notoro was hit by a torpedo from the submarine USS Haddock and had to return to Truk. The repairs lasted until 24 January 1944.

On the evening of 25 June 1944, Notoro sailed as part of the convoy MISHI-03 from Miri, Borneo, to Singapore. On the evening of 28 June the convoy was spotted by the submarine USS Flasher, which attacked after midnight on 29 June. Of the three torpedoes fired at Notoro, two or all three struck the tanker and Notoro stopped dead in the water. On the afternoon of 30 June Notoro was towed to Singapore, but repairs were slow. In addition, the ship was severely damaged in the King George VI Graving Dock of the Sembawang shipyard on 5 November 1944 during an air raid by 53 B-29 bombers of the USAAF and subsequently the ship was decommissioned. Until the end of the war, it was used as a floating fuel tank. In 1947 Notoro was either scrapped or sunk as a breakwater near Pulau Brani by the British.

On 3 May 1947 Notoro was struck from the list of ships of the Japanese Navy.

== Sources ==
- Ministry of the Navy, ed. (October 1971) [1941]. 海軍制度沿革 巻八 (in Japanese). Vol. 明治百年史叢書 第180巻. 原書房.
- Ministry of the Navy, ed. (March 1972) [1941]. 海軍制度沿革 巻九 (in Japanese). Vol. 明治百年史叢書 第181巻. 原書房.
- Ministry of the Navy, ed. (April 1972) [1940]. 海軍制度沿革 巻十の2 (in Japanese). Vol. 明治百年史叢書 第183巻. 原書房.
- Shizuo Fukui (1994). 写真 日本海軍全艦艇史 (in Japanese). ベストセラーズ. ISBN 4-584-17054-1.
- 雑誌『丸』編集部/編, ed. (October 1989). 写真日本の軍艦 第4巻 空母II (in Japanese). 光人社. ISBN 4-7698-0454-7.
