= Japanese supply ship Mamiya =

Food supply ship of the Imperial Japanese Navy

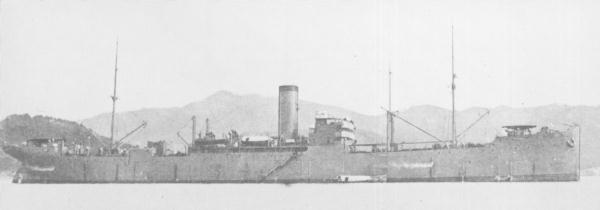
- Mamiya in 1930

History

Empire of Japan
- Name: Mamiya
- Namesake: Mamiya Strait
- Builder: Kawasaki Shipyards
- Laid down: 25 October 1922
- Launched: 26 October 1923
- Completed: 15 July 1924
- Decommissioned: 10 February 1945
- Fate: Sunk, 21 December 1944

General characteristics
- Type: Supply ship
- Displacement: 15,820 long tons (16,074 t) for standard
- Length: 144.8 m (475 ft 1 in) overall
- Beam: 18.59 m (61 ft 0 in)
- Draught: 8.43 m (27 ft 8 in)
- Installed power: 10,000 shp
- Propulsion: 1 × reciprocating engine; 8 × boilers; 1 shaft
- Speed: 19.2 knots (22.1 mph; 35.6 km/h)
- Range: 6,000 nmi (11,000 km) at 14 kn (16 mph; 26 km/h)
- Complement: 283
- Armament: 2 × 140 mm (5.5 in) L/50 3rd Year Type guns; 2 × 76.2 mm (3.00 in) L/40 3rd Year Type AA guns
- Armour: none

Mamiya (間宮) was a food supply ship of the Imperial Japanese Navy which was in service from the 1920s to the Second World War.

== Construction ==
Mamiya was originally meant to be an oil transporter but was instead outfitted to be a food supply ship. The Imperial Japanese Navy sent her to the Kawasaki Shipbuilding Yard where she was fitted with facilities for carrying enough food for 18,000 men over three weeks, and kitchens to produce large quantities of food including yōkan, manjū, tofu, and konyaku. A number of chefs and pastry chefs were employed aboard and she became part of the Combined Fleet.

== Service in Pacific War ==
Already old by the outbreak of war, she continued to be part of the navy's supply operations in the Pacific. On 12 October 1943, she was damaged by the US Navy submarine USS Cero near Chichi-jima, and on 6 May 1944, was again damaged by USS Spearfish in the East China Sea. In both cases she was repaired and returned to service. The food supply ship was torpedoed and damaged in the South China Sea (17°48′N 114°09′E) by USS Sealion. She was torpedoed again and sunk (17°48′N 114°09′E) on 21 December by Sealion.

== Books ==
- The Maru Special, Japanese Naval Vessels No.34 Japanese Auxiliary ships, Ushio Shobō (Japan), December 1979, Book code 68343-34
- Collection of writings by Sizuo Fukui Vol.10, Stories of Japanese Support Vessels, Kōjinsha (Japan), December 1993, ISBN 4-7698-0658-2
