= Japanese seaplane tender Kamoi =

Seaplane tender of the Imperial Japanese Navy

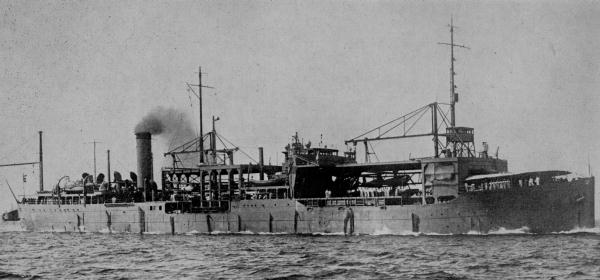
- Kamoi in 1937

History

Empire of Japan
- Name: Kamoi
- Namesake: Cape Kamui
- Builder: New York Shipbuilding
- Laid down: 14 September 1921
- Launched: 8 June 1922
- Completed: 12 September 1922
- Commissioned: 12 September 1922
- Decommissioned: 3 May 1947
- In service: 1922–1945
- Reclassified: February 1933 (seaplane tender); 1939 (flying boat tender); 15 April 1944 (oiler)
- Fate: Scrapped post war
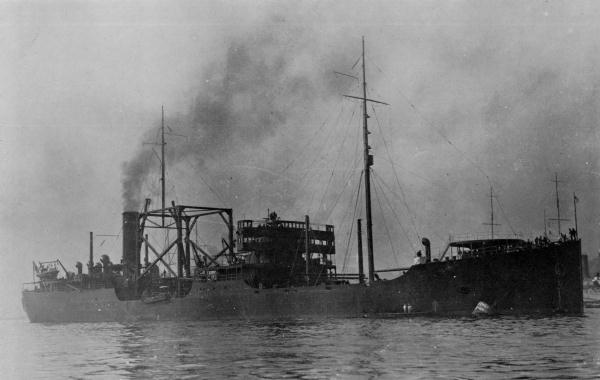
- Kamoi in 1920s

General characteristics as oiler (1922)
- Displacement: 17,000 long tons (17,273 t) standard
- Length: 148.89 m (488 ft 6 in) Lpp
- Beam: 20.42 m (67 ft 0 in)
- Draught: 8.53 m (28 ft 0 in)
- Propulsion: 1 × GE/Curtis turbine; 2 × GE electrical generators; 4 × Babcock & Wilcox oil/coal-fired boilers; 2 shafts, 8,000 bhp (6,000 kW)
- Speed: 15.0 knots (27.8 km/h; 17.3 mph)
- Range: 8,000 nmi (15,000 km) at 7 kn (13 km/h; 8.1 mph)
- Capacity: 10,000 tons oil
- Complement: 181
- Armament: 2 × 140 mm (5.5 in) naval guns; 2 × 76.2 mm (3.00 in) AA guns

General characteristics as seaplane tender (1933)
- Complement: 324
- Armament: 2 × 76.2 mm (3.00 in) AA guns
- Aircraft carried: 22 × Nakajima E4N or; 12 × Yokosuka E5Y
- Aviation facilities: hangar

General characteristics as flying boat tender (1939)
- Displacement: 15,381 long tons (15,628 t) trial
- Propulsion: 1 × GE/Curtis turbine; 2 × GE electrical generators; 4 × Kampon boilers; 2 shafts
- Armament: 2 × 140 mm (5.5 in) naval guns; 1 × 76.2 mm (3.00 in) AA gun; 10 × 20 mm AA guns

Kamoi (神威, "Divine Authority") was an oiler/seaplane tender/flying boat tender of the Imperial Japanese Navy, serving from the 1920s through World War II. She was initially planned in 1920 as one of six of the oilers under the Eight-eight fleet final plan.

== Service ==
Kamoi was completed 12 September 1922, and classified as a special service ship (Oiler). On 27 September she sailed to Yokosuka, from where she sailed to the Japanese mainland and back no fewer than 25 times.

Somewhere around the end of 1932, she was converted to seaplane tender for January 28 Incident at Uraga Dock Company, an overhaul that was finished in February 1933. Upon completion of this evolution, she was assigned to the Combined Fleet.

On 1 June 1934, Kamoi was reclassified as a warship (seaplane tender). On 1 June 1936, she was assigned to the Third Carrier Division. While on this assignment, during July 1937, she was assigned to search for downed American aviator Amelia Earhart. However, the order was cancelled before Kamoi could start searching.

In 1939, the ship was once again overhauled, and flying boat tending facilities were added. On 15 November 1940, Kamoi was reassigned to the 24th Air Flotilla. On 1 December 1941, the 24th Air Flotilla was assigned to the 4th Fleet.

In January 1942, she provided support to the Rabaul and Kavieng invasions. On 1 April 1942, the 24th Air Flotilla was assigned to the 11th Air Fleet. On 1 April 1943, she was assigned to the 3rd Southern Expeditionary Fleet, Southwest Area Fleet. On 28 January 1944, Kamoi sustained heavy damage in an attack by the submarine USS Bowfin off Makassar. During the resulting repairs at Singapore, her aviation facilities were removed. As such, she was reclassified as a special service ship (oiler) on 15 April 1944. Repairs were completed on 29 August. On 24 September, she was slightly damaged by aircraft of Task Force 38 at Coron Bay. Three days later, she sustained heavy damage in an attack by a United States Navy submarine outside Manila Bay. At some unspecified point afterward, she went into repairs at Yokosuka Naval Arsenal. Repairs were completed on 31 December, at which point she joined the Hi-87 convoy from Moji to Singapore. On 16 January 1945, she was heavily damaged in an air raid on Hong Kong. She was separated from the convoy at this time. On 5 April 1945, with repairs still incomplete, she was once again damaged by air raid, later sinking in shallow water. Kamoi was decommissioned on 3 May 1947.

Kamoi was scrapped by the British force, but details are unclear.

== See also ==
- Barnegat-class seaplane tender
- Currituck-class seaplane tender
- Japanese seaplane tender Notoro
- Japanese seaplane tender Akitsushima

== Bibliography ==
- Model Art Extra No.537, "Drawings of Imperial Japanese Naval Vessels Part-3", "Model Art Co. Ltd". Archived from the original on 2012-06-05. (Japan), 1999.
- Collection of writings by Sizuo Fukui Vol.7, "Stories of Japanese Aircraft Carriers", "Kōjinsha". (Japan), 1996, ISBN 4-7698-0655-8.
- Ships of the World special issue Vol.40, "History of Japanese Aircraft Carriers", "Kaijinsha"., (Japan), 1994.
- Shinshichirō Komamiya, The Wartime Convoy Histories, "Shuppan Kyōdōsha". Archived from the original on 2011-07-22., (Japan), 1987, ISBN 4-87970-047-9.
- The Maru Special, Japanese Naval Vessels No. 25, "Japanese seaplane tenders", "Ushio Shobō". (Japan), 1979.
