= 30 mm caliber =

Specific size of autocannon ammunition

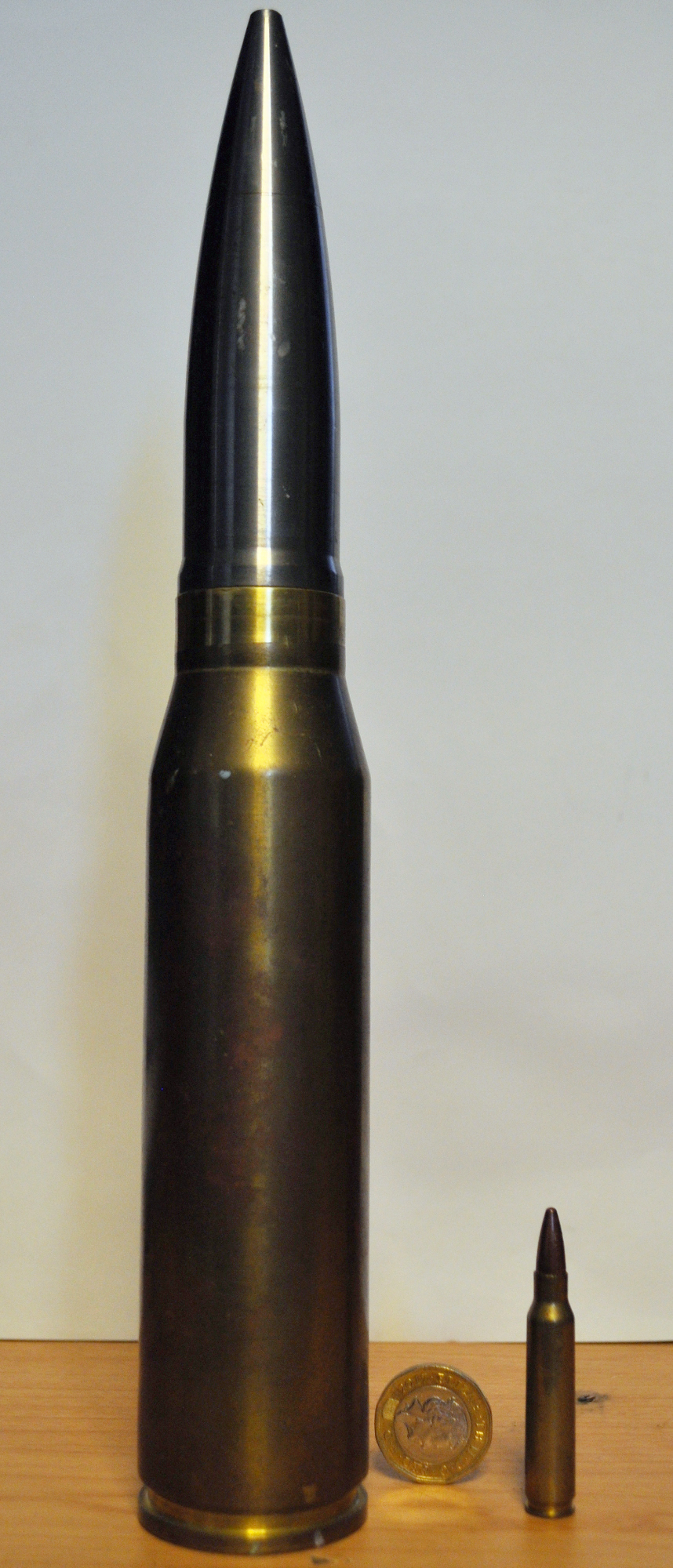
Size comparison between 30×170mm (left), a One Pound Coin (middle) and 5.56x45mm NATO (right)

The 30 mm caliber is a range of autocannon ammunition.

== Usage ==
Ammunition in 30 mm is typically not used against personnel but rather as an anti-materiel or armor-piercing round. Rounds of this size can be effective against lightly armored vehicles as well as fortified bunkers. It is also a popular caliber for shipboard close-in weapons systems (CIWS), such as the Russian AK-630 and Dutch Goalkeeper CIWS.

The Armed Forces of the Russian Federation use their 30 mm weapons in a variety of vehicles, including the Su-25 attack aircraft, Mi-24 helicopter, Mi-28 attack helicopter, Ka-50 attack helicopter, and the BMP-2, BMP-3, and BTR-90 infantry fighting vehicles. The most modern anti-aircraft gun systems in use by Russia are chambered in 30 mm.

The U.S. military uses 30 mm weapons in their A-10 Thunderbolt II ground-attack aircraft, AC-130 gunship (AC-130J Ghostrider variant), and in the AH-64 Apache attack helicopter (30×113mm). It was going to be used in the Expeditionary Fighting Vehicle, until the project was canceled. The United States Navy uses 30 mm weapons on the San Antonio-class amphibious transport dock and on Freedom and Independence-class littoral combat ship as part of the surface warfare (SuW) package. In 2012, the Navy decided to replace the Mk 110 57 mm cannons on Zumwalt-class destroyer with the Mk 46 GWS (Gun Weapon System), a navalized mounting of the Mk44 Bushmaster chain gun. In 2022, the United States Coast Guard announced plans to install 30 mm Mk44 chain guns on newly-built Polar Security Cutters (PSCs), though existing cutters would retain their 25mm Mark 38 mounts.

== Types of ammunition ==
30 mm weapons are used in a variety of roles. As a result, ammunition in 30 mm comes in several varieties: armor-piercing (AP), high-explosive (HE), airburst, and target practice (TP) rounds. Both AP and HE cartridges commonly possess incendiary or tracer elements, which may be noted in its designation; API and HE-T are Armor-Piercing Incendiary and High-Explosive Tracer respectively.

== Weapons ==
Examples of 30 mm rounds and cannons

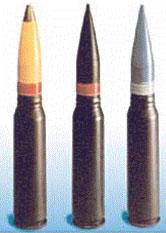
Swiss 30×173mm

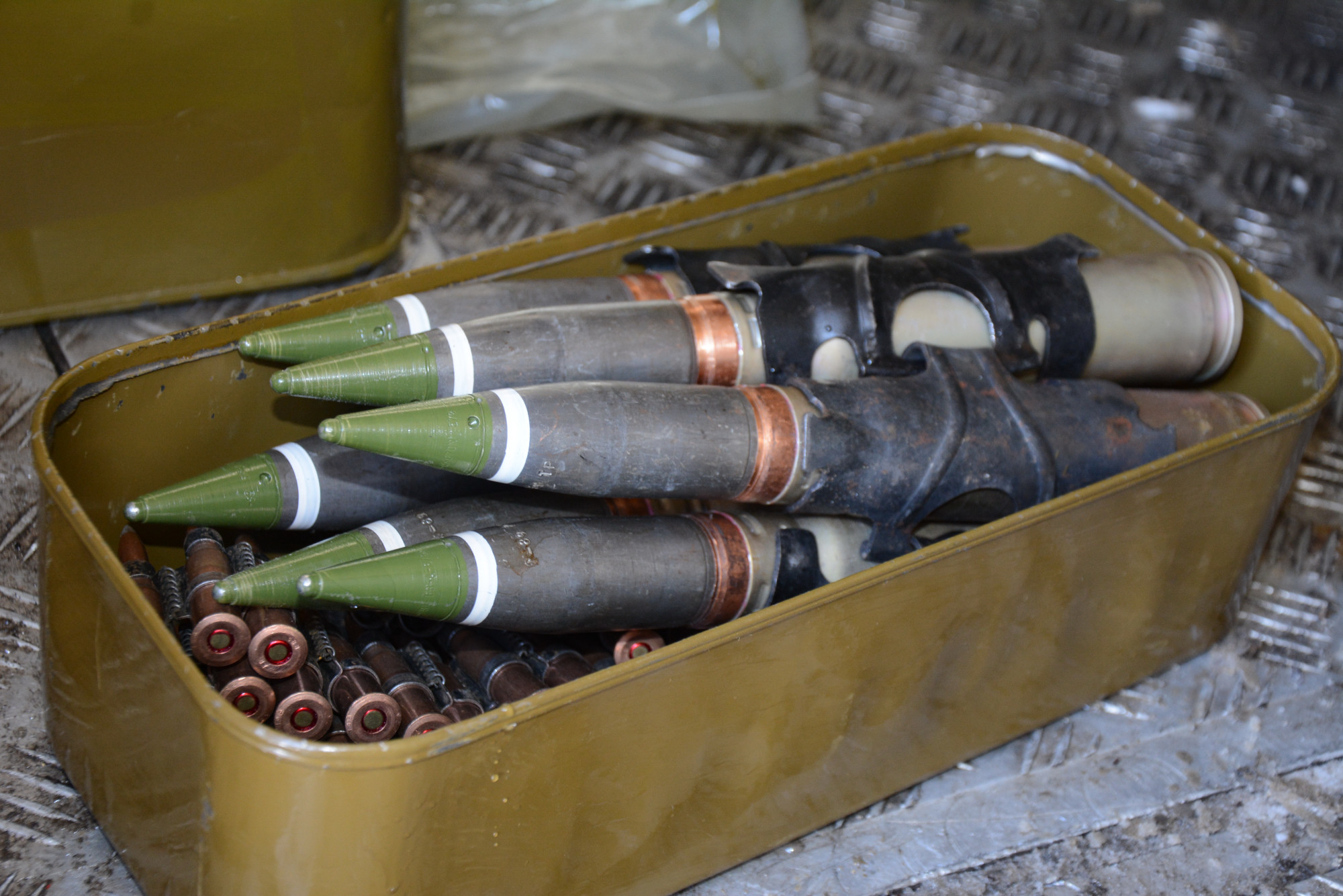
Soviet 30×165mm

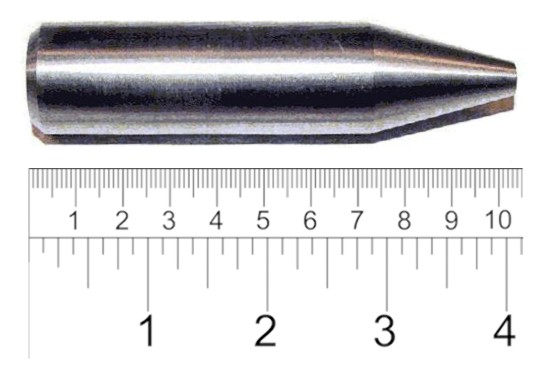
The DU penetrator of a 30×173 mm round used in the GAU-8

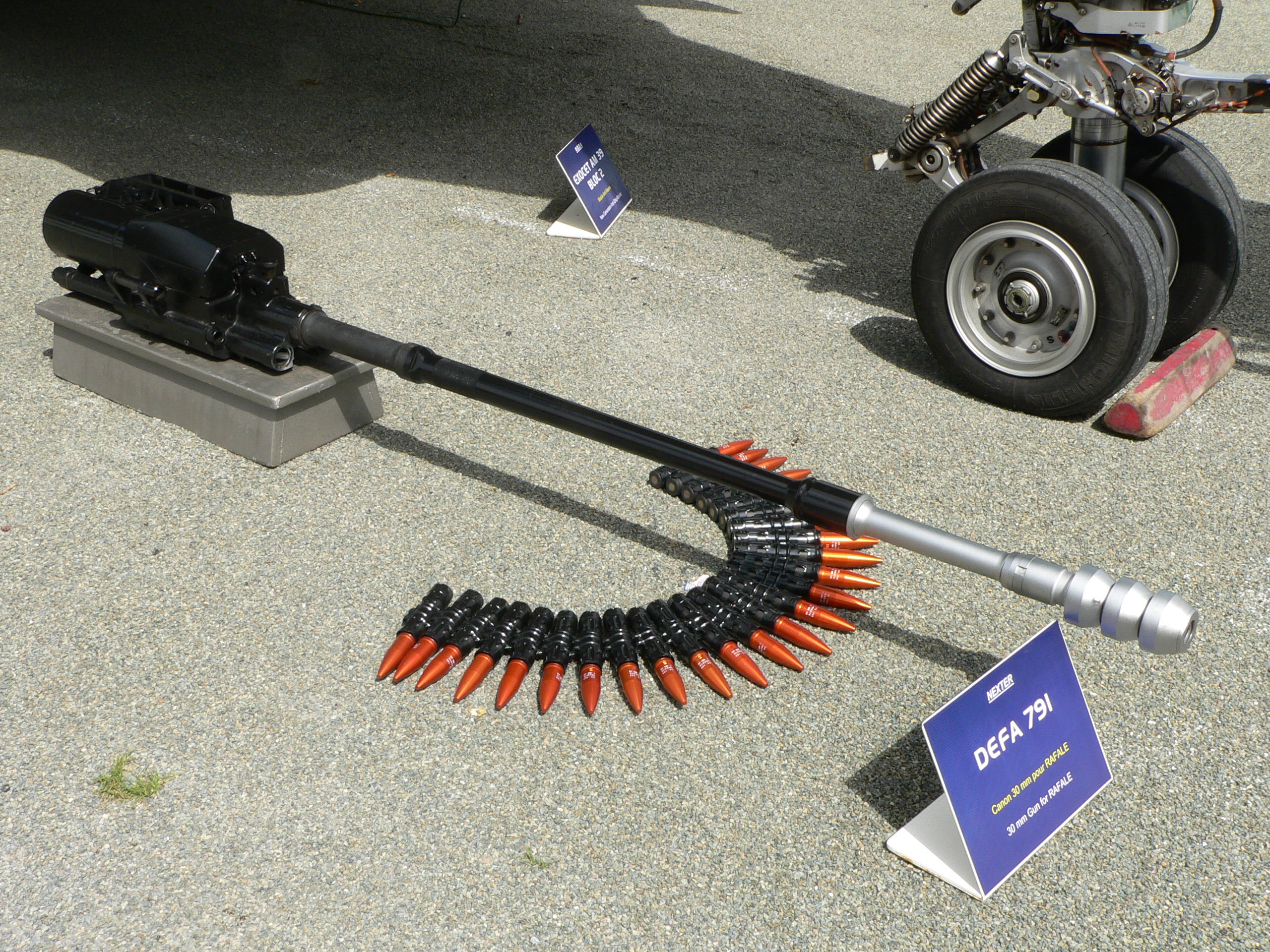
French 30×150mmB

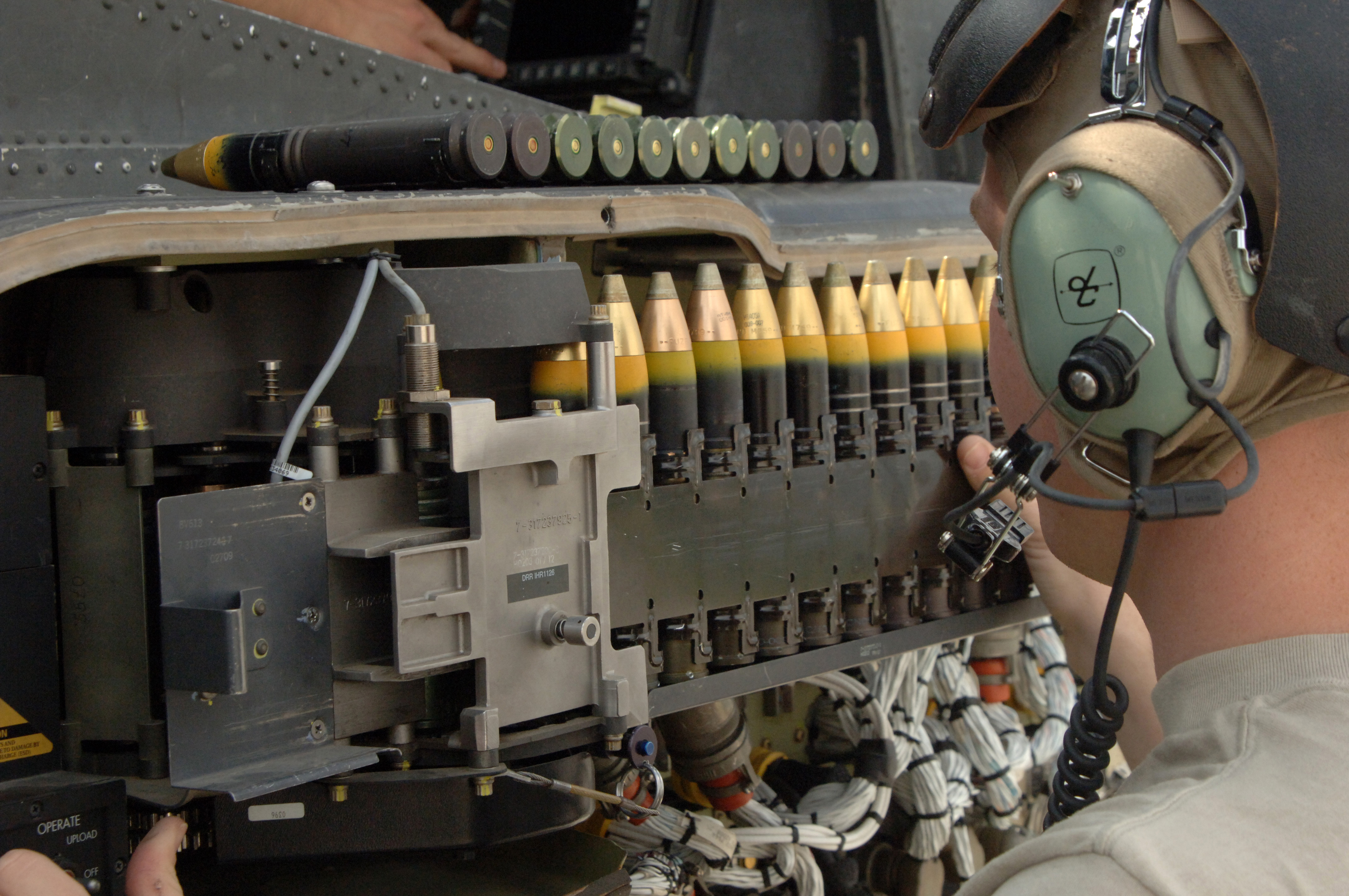
30×113mmB rounds being loaded into an AH-64D Apache Longbow

Cartridge	Era	Weapon	Country of origin	Designer	Type	Example platforms
30×29mmB	1970s–	AGS-17	Soviet Union	OKB-16	Automatic grenade launcher	BMD-3, BTR-90, BTR-D
30×29mmB	1970s–	AGS-30	Russia	KBP Instrument Design Bureau	Automatic grenade launcher	BTR-T, GAZ-2975 Tigr, M2020 (tank)
30×85mmB	1945	MK 213	Nazi Germany	Mauser	Revolver cannon	n/a
30×86mmB type A	1945–1952	ADEN Mk.1	United Kingdom	Enfield	Revolver cannon	Hawker Hunter, Gloster Meteor
30×86mmB type B	1952–1955	ADEN Mk.2	United Kingdom	Enfield	Revolver cannon	Hawker Hunter, Gloster Meteor
30×90mmRB	1942–1951	MK 108 cannon	Nazi Germany	Rheinmetall-Borsig	Aircraft autocannon	Me 262, Me 163, Bf 109, Bf 110, Fw 190
30×92mmRB	1942–1945	Type 2	Japanese Empire	Dai-Nippon Weapons Co., Ltd.	Blowback autocannon	Mitsubishi J2M (prototype)
30×97mmB	1951–1955	DEFA 540 series	France	DEFA	Revolver cannon	Dassault M.D.452 IIC
30×111mmB	1955–	ADEN Mk.3	United Kingdom	Revolver cannon	Revolver cannon	English Electric Lightning, Hawker Hunter, Saab Draken, SEPECAT Jaguar
30×113mmB	1955–	ADEN Mk.4, 5, 6	United Kingdom	Royal Small Arms Factory	Revolver cannon	English Electric Lightning, Hawker Hunter, Saab Draken, SEPECAT Jaguar
30×113mmB	1955–	DEFA 550 series	France	Direction des Études et Fabrications d'Armement	Revolver cannon	Dassault Mystere, Mirage series, Étendard series, SEPECAT Jaguar, Fiat G.91, AMX International AMX
30×113mmB	1955–	M230	United States	Hughes	Chain gun	Boeing AH-64 Apache, JLTV MADIS, Oshkosh M-ATV, Stryker M-SHORAD
30×113mmB	1955–	VENOM LR 30	United Kingdom	AEI Systems	Revolver cannon	Midgard 300 RWS, electro optic systems (EOS) R400 ROWS (prototype)
30×113mmB	1955–	30 M 781	France	GIAT	Chain gun	Eurocopter Tiger
30×113mmB	1955–	XM188	United States	General Electric	Rotary cannon	Bell AH-1 Cobra (prototype)
30×114mm	1944–1945	Ho-155	Japanese Empire	Nagoya Arsenal	Autocannon	Nakajima Ki-84-I Hei, Kawasaki Ki-102c Hei
30×122mm	1945	Type 5	Japanese Empire	Nihon Tokushuko	Autocannon	Yokosuka P1Y, Kyushu J7W, Mitsubishi J2M (planned)
30×136mmB	1950–1960	HSS.825	Switzerland	Hispano-Suiza	Gas-operated autocannon	EFW N-20, Aerfer Sagittario 2, Aerfer Ariete, FFA P-16
30×138mm	1950s	HS.836	Switzerland	Hispano-Suiza	Autocannon	n/a
30×150mmB	1980s–	30 M 791	France	Nexter	Revolver cannon	Dassault Rafale
30×155mmB	1954–	NR-30	Soviet Union	Nudelman-Rikhter	Short-recoil autocannon	MiG-19, MiG-21, Su-7, Su-17, J-7
30×158mmB	1950s	HS.603	Switzerland	Hispano-Suiza	Autocannon	n/a
30×158mmB	1950s	HS.604	Switzerland	Hispano-Suiza	Autocannon	n/a
30×158mmB	1950s	HS.606	Switzerland	Hispano-Suiza	Autocannon	n/a
30×165mm	1980–	GSh-30-1	Soviet Union	Gryazev-Shipunov	Short-recoil autocannon	Sukhoi Su-27, Sukhoi Su-30, Sukhoi Su-35, Sukhoi Su-57, Mikoyan MiG-29
30×165mm	1980–	GSh-30-2	Soviet Union	Gryazev-Shipunov	Twin autocannon	Sukhoi Su-25, Mil Mi-24P
30×165mm	1980–	GSh-6-30	Soviet Union	Gryazev-Shipunov	Rotary cannon	MiG-27, Kortik CIWS
30×165mm	1980–	AK-630	Soviet Union	TsKIB SOO	Rotary cannon	A-213-Vympel-A CIWS
30×165mm	1980–	2A42	Soviet Union	KBP Instrument Design Bureau	Gas-operated autocannon	BMP-2, BMD-2, BMD-3, Kurganets-25, T-15 Armata, Mil Mi-28, Kamov Ka-50, BTR-90
30×165mm	1980–	2A72	Soviet Union	KBP Instrument Design Bureau	Long-recoil autocannon	BMP-3 (also in BRM-3K version), BMD-4, BTR-82A, Uran-9
30×165mm	1980–	2A38	Soviet Union	KBP Instrument Design Bureau	Twin anti-aircraft gas-operated autocannon	2K22 Tunguska, Pantsir-S
30×165mm	1980–	CRN 91	India	Ordnance Factory Medak	Light naval gun	Trinkat-class patrol vessel, Kumbhir-class landing ship, Car Nicobar-class fast attack craft
30×165mm	1980–	Type 730/1130	China	713th Research Institute	Gatling gun	Type 052C destroyer, Type 001A aircraft carrier, LD-2000
30×170mm	1939–	HS.410	France	Hispano-Suiza	Autocannon	n/a
30×170mm	1939–	HS.411	France	Hispano-Suiza	Autocannon	n/a
30×170mm	1939–	HS.830	Switzerland	Hispano-Suiza	Autocannon	n/a
30×170mm	1939–	HS.831	Switzerland	Hispano-Suiza	Gas-unlocked delayed-blowback autocannon	Various airborne, maritime and land-based systems.
30×170mm	1939–	HS.837	Switzerland	Hispano-Suiza	Autocannon	n/a
30×170mm	1939–	KCB	Switzerland	Oerlikon	Autocannon	Rebranded HS.831
30×170mm	1939–	L21A1 RARDEN	United Kingdom	Enfield	Long-recoil autocannon	FV721 Fox, FV107 Scimitar, FV510 Warrior
30×173mm (STANAG 4624)	1970s–	KCA	Switzerland	Oerlikon	Revolver cannon	Saab 37 Viggen
30×173mm (STANAG 4624)	1970s–	KCE	Switzerland	Rheinmetall Air Defence	Revolver cannon	Rheinmetall Sea Snake turret, Skyranger 30
30×173mm (STANAG 4624)	1970s–	GAU-8 Avenger	United States	General Electric	Gatling gun	Fairchild Republic A-10 Thunderbolt II, Signaal Goalkeeper CIWS
30×173mm (STANAG 4624)	1970s–	Mk44 Bushmaster II	United States	Alliant Techsystems	Chain gun	Various airborne, maritime and land-based systems.
30×173mm (STANAG 4624)	1970s–	MK 30	Germany	Rheinmetall	Automatic cannon	ASCOD, Boxer CRV, Boxer RadSPz (PuBo), Lynx KF41, Piranha III (Spanish Marines), SPz Puma, 30mm/82 Compact
30×173mm (STANAG 4624)	1970s–	EMAK 30	South Africa	Denel Land Systems	Linkless cam gun	Badger
30×173mm (STANAG 4624)	1970s–	Maadi Griffin	United States	Robert Stewart	Prototype anti-materiel rifle	Maadi Griffin
30×173mm (STANAG 4624)	1970s–	30mm X-GUN	Italy	Leonardo	Automatic Cannon	
30×173mm (STANAG 4624)	1970s–	Wotan 30	Germany	Rheinmetall	Automatic cannon	Lynx KF41
30×173mm (STANAG 4624)	1970s–	GTS-30/N	Slovakia	ZŤS – ŠPECIÁL	Gas-operated autocannon	BOV 8x8 Vydra
30×173mm (STANAG 4624)	1970s–	GUARDIAN L-HIIT	Spain	Escribano	RWS	
30×173mm (STANAG 4624)	1970s–	GUARDIAN 30	Spain	Escribano	RWS	Dragon
30×173mm (STANAG 4624)	1970s–	SENTINEL 30	Spain	Escribano	RWS	Spanish Navy; Peruvian Navy; Royal Thai Navy
30×184mmB	1940–1945	MK 101 cannon	Nazi Germany	Rheinmetall-Borsig	Autocannon	Henschel Hs 129, Bf 110
30×184mmB	1940–1945	MK 103 cannon	Nazi Germany	Rheinmetall-Borsig	Electrically primed autocannon	Fw 190, Flakpanzer IV Kugelblitz
30×210mm	1944–1992	MK 303 cannon	Nazi Germany	Krieghoff	Twin anti-aircraft autocannon	Type XXI submarine
30×210mm	1944–1992	vz.53/59	Czechoslovakia	Praga Hostivař	Twin anti-aircraft autocannon	M53/59 Praga
30×210mmB	1969–1990s	NN-30	Soviet Union	Tulamashzavod	Twin revolver cannon	AK-230 light naval gun/CIWS
30×250mm CL	1997	RMK30	Germany	Mauser	Recoilless revolver cannon	Wiesel AWC (experimental), Eurocopter Tiger UH (experimental)

== See also ==
- 20 mm caliber
- 23 mm caliber
- 25 mm caliber
- 37 mm caliber
- 40 mm grenade
- Table of handgun and rifle cartridges
