= List of autocannon =

Autocannons are automatic guns with calibers of 20 millimeters to 57 millimeters. There are many types, including chain guns, gast guns, revolver cannons, and rotary cannons. They are used as military aircraft main guns, naval guns, anti-aircraft weapons, infantry fighting vehicle main guns and are occasionally found on reconnaissance vehicles like the LAV-25.

== General autocannons ==
Caliber (mm)	Power source	Weapon name	Country of origin	Period
20	API Blowback	Becker Type M2 20 mm cannon	German Empire	World War I
20	Short Recoil or Gas	Nkm wz.38 FK	Poland	Interwar
20	API Blowback	Polsten	Poland	World War II
20	Gas	Berezin B-20	Soviet Union	World War II
20	Gas	ShVAK cannon	Soviet Union	World War II
20	Short Recoil	Ho-1 cannon	Empire of Japan	World War II
20	Short Recoil	Ho-3 cannon	Empire of Japan	World War II
20	Short Recoil	Ho-5 cannon	Empire of Japan	World War II
20	API Blowback	Type 99 cannon	Empire of Japan	World War II
20	Recoil	Automatkanon m/40	Sweden	World War II
20	Recoil	Automatkanon m/45	Sweden	World War II
20	Recoil	Automatkanon m/49	Sweden	Cold War
20	Gas Delayed Blowback	Hispano-Suiza HS.404	France	World War II
20	Gas Delayed Blowback	M621 cannon	France	Cold War
20	API Blowback	Oerlikon S	Switzerland	World War II
20	API Blowback	Oerlikon FF	Switzerland	World War II
20	Gas and Blowback	Oerlikon KAE	Switzerland	Modern
20	API Blowback	MG FF cannon	Nazi Germany	World War II
20	Short Recoil	MG 151/20	Nazi Germany	World War II
20	Gas, Blowback, Recoil	Rheinmetall MK 20 Rh 202	Germany	Cold War
20	Gas and Blowback	Colt Mk 12 cannon	United States	Cold War
23	Gas	Afanasev Makarov AM-23	Soviet Union	Cold War
23	Gast Gun, Gas	Gryazev-Shipunov GSh-23	Soviet Union	Cold War
23	Short Recoil	Nudelman-Rikhter NR-23	Soviet Union	Cold War
23	Short Recoil	Nudelman-Suranov NS-23	Soviet Union	World War II
25	Recoil	72-K	Soviet Union	World War II
25	Recoil	Automatkanon M/32	Sweden	World War II
25	Gas	Hotchkiss 25 mm cannon	France	World War II
25	Gas	Type 96 cannon	Empire of Japan	World War II
25	Chain Gun, Electric	M242 Bushmaster	United States	Cold War
25	Gas	Oerlikon KBA	Switzerland	Cold War
28	Recoil	1.1" autocannon	United States	World War II
30	Gas and Recoil	30 mm Shipunov 2A42	Soviet Union	Cold War
30	Long Recoil	30 mm Shipunov 2A72	Soviet Union	Cold War
30	Short Recoil	Gryazev-Shipunov GSh-30-1	Soviet Union	Cold War
30	Gast Gun, Gas	Gryazev-Shipunov GSh-30-2	Soviet Union	Cold War
30	Short Recoil	Ho-155 cannon	Empire of Japan	World War II
30	API Blowback	Type 2 cannon	Empire of Japan	World War II
30	Gas Delayed Blowback	Type 5 cannon	Empire of Japan	World War II
30	Short Recoil	MK 101 cannon	Nazi Germany	World War II
30	Gas and Recoil	MK 103 cannon	Nazi Germany	World War II
30	API Blowback	MK 108 cannon	Nazi Germany	World War II
30	Short Recoil	Nudelman-Rikhter NR-30	Soviet Union	Cold War
30	Long Recoil	RARDEN	United Kingdom	Cold War
30	Chain Gun, Electric	M230 Chain Gun	United States	Cold War
30	Chain Gun, Electric	Mk44 Bushmaster II	United States	Cold War
35	Gas	Oerlikon KDA	Switzerland	Cold War
35	Chain Gun, Electric	Bushmaster III	United States	Cold War
37	Short Recoil	BK 37	Nazi Germany	World War II
37	Long Recoil	COW 37 mm gun	United Kingdom	World War II
37	Long Recoil	Ho-203 cannon	Empire of Japan	World War II
37	Short Recoil	Ho-204 cannon	Empire of Japan	World War II
37	Long Recoil	M4 cannon	United States	World War II
37	Short Recoil	Nudelman N-37	Soviet Union	Cold War
37	Short Recoil	Nudelman-Suranov NS-37	Soviet Union	World War II
37	Internal	QF 1-pounder pom-pom	United Kingdom	World War I
40	Internal	Bofors 40 mm gun L/60	Sweden	World War II
40	Internal	Bofors 40 mm gun L/70	Sweden	Cold War
40	Internal	Ho-301 cannon	Empire of Japan	World War II
40	Internal	QF 2-pounder pom-pom	United Kingdom	World War I
40	Internal	Vickers S gun	United Kingdom	World War II
40	Internal	Otobreda Fast Forty	Italy	Cold War
40	External	Bushmaster IV	United States	Cold War
40	Internal	40CT cannon	United Kingdom	Modern
45	Internal	Nudelman-Suranov NS-45	Soviet Union	World War II
50	Internal	Rheinmetall BK-5	Nazi Germany	World War II
57	Internal	Ho-401 cannon	Empire of Japan	World War II
57	Internal	AZP S-60	Soviet Union	Cold War
57	Internal	ZIF-31	Soviet Union	Cold War
57	Internal	Automatkanon m/47	Sweden	Cold War
57	Internal	57 mm Bofors L/60	Sweden	Cold War
57	Internal	57 mm Bofors L/70	Sweden	Cold War

== Revolver cannons ==
Caliber (mm)	Power source	Weapon name	Country of origin	Period
20	Internal	M39 cannon	United States	Cold War
20	Internal	Mauser MG 213	Nazi Germany	World War II
23	Internal	Rikhter R-23	Soviet Union	Cold War
27	Internal	Mauser BK-27	Germany	Cold War
30	External	Rheinmetall RMK30	Germany	Modern
30	Internal	ADEN cannon	United Kingdom	Cold War
30	Internal	DEFA cannon	France	Cold War
30	External	GIAT 30	France	Cold War
30	Internal	Oerlikon KCA	Switzerland	Cold War
30	Internal	NN-30	Soviet Union	Cold War
35	Internal	Oerlikon Millennium 35 mm Naval Revolver Gun System	Switzerland	Modern
42	External	Red King	United Kingdom	Cold War

== Rotary cannons ==
Caliber (mm)	Power source	Weapon name	Country of origin	Period
20	External	M61 Vulcan	United States	Cold War
20	External	M197 electric cannon	United States	Cold War
23	Internal	Gryazev-Shipunov GSh-6-23	Soviet Union	Cold War
25	External	GAU-12 Equalizer	United States	Cold War
30	External	GAU-8 Avenger	United States	Cold War
30	External	GAU-13	United States	Cold War
30	Internal	Gryazev-Shipunov GSh-6-30	Soviet Union	Cold War
37	External	T250	United States	Cold War
37	External	Hotchkiss 1-pounder Rotary Cannon	France	19th century
47	External	Hotchkiss 3-pounder Rotary Cannon	France	19th century

== See also ==
- Gatling gun

== Bibliography ==
- Williams, Anthony G. (2022). Autocannon: A History of Automatic Cannon and Their Ammunition. Marlborough, UK: Crowood Press. ISBN 978-1-78500-920-4.
