= Mitsubishi A7M Reppū =

Japanese carrier-based fighter aircraft

A7M Reppū
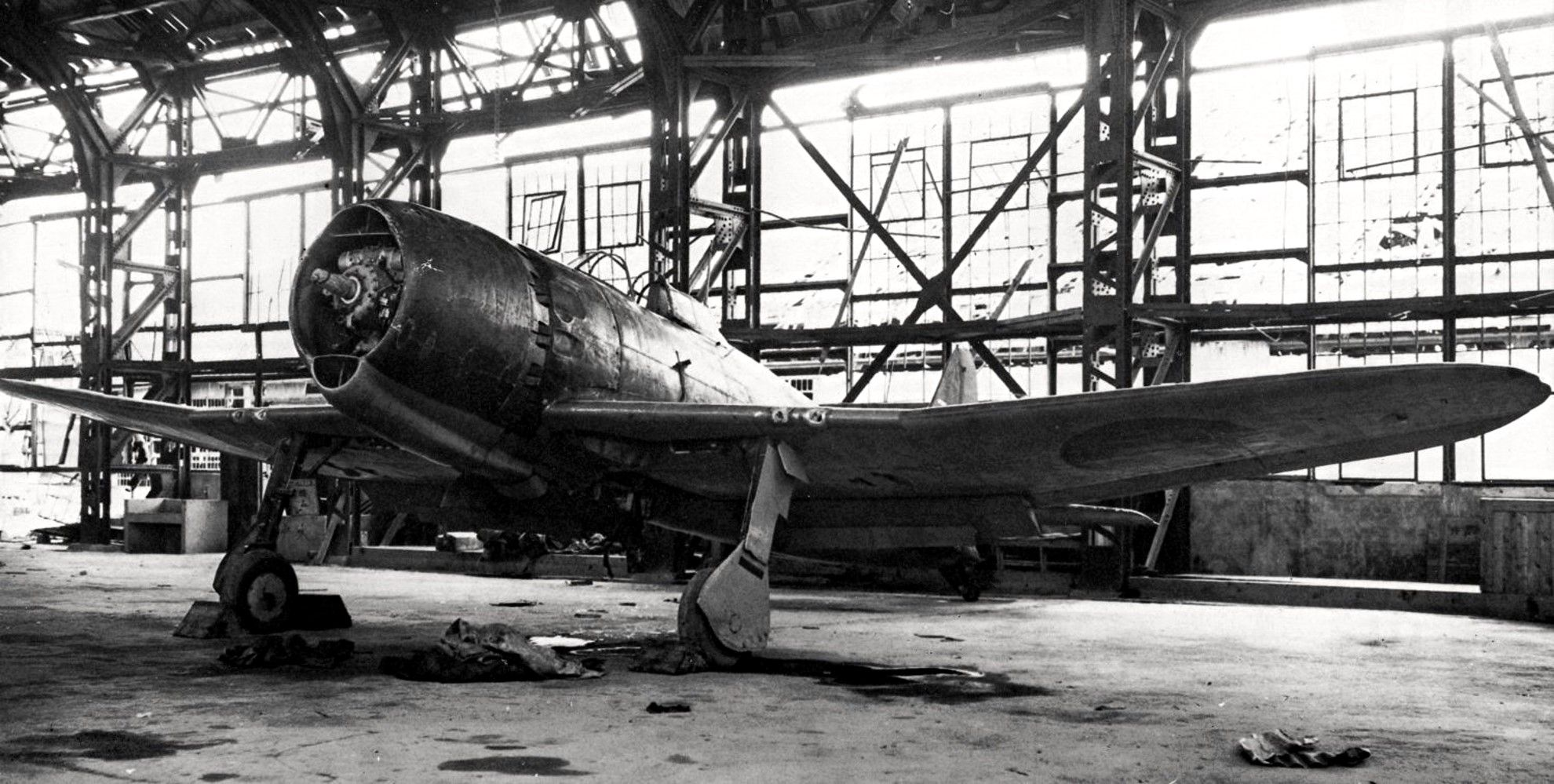
- A Mitsubishi A7M2 Reppū in a hangar, c. 1945

General information
- Type: Carrier-based fighter
- National origin: Japan
- Manufacturer: Mitsubishi Heavy Industries
- Status: Retired
- Primary user: Imperial Japanese Navy Air Service
- Number built: 9

History
- First flight: 6 May 1944
- Retired: 1945

The Mitsubishi A7M Reppū (烈風, "Strong Wind") was designed as the successor to the Imperial Japanese Navy's A6M Zero, with development beginning in 1942. Performance objectives were to achieve superior speed, climb, diving, and armament over the Zero, as well as better maneuverability – all parameters that were ultimately achieved towards the end of its development in 1945. However, limitations on Japanese industry towards the end of the war prevented the A7M from ever entering mass production or being deployed for active duty, and it never saw active service. Its Allied reporting name was "Sam".

== Design and development ==
Towards the end of 1940, the Imperial Japanese Navy asked Mitsubishi to start design on a carrier-based fighter, to meet specification 16-Shi (a designation under a system using regnal years that indicated "1941" – the year in which the specification was formally issued). The fighter would be the successor to the carrier-based Zero. At that time, however, there were no viable high-output, compact engines to use for a new fighter. In addition, Jiro Horikoshi's team was preoccupied with addressing early production issues with the A6M2b as well as starting development on the A6M3 and the 14-Shi interceptor (which would later become the Mitsubishi J2M Raiden, a land-based interceptor built to counter high-altitude bombers). As a result, work on the Zero successor was halted in January 1941.

In April 1942, the development of the A6M3 and the 14-Shi interceptor was complete, and the Japanese Navy once again tasked Mitsubishi and Horikoshi's team with designing a new Zero successor to become the Navy Experimental 17-shi Ko (A) Type Carrier Fighter Reppu. In July 1942 the Navy issued specifications for the fighter: it had to fly faster than 345 kn (639 km/h; 397 mph) above 6,000 m (20,000 ft), climb to 6,000 m (20,000 ft) in less than 6 minutes, be armed with two 20 mm cannon and two 13 mm (0.51 in) machine guns, and retain the maneuverability of the A6M3.

As before, one of the main hurdles was engine selection. To meet the specifications the engine would need to produce at least 2,000 hp (1,500 kW), which narrowed the choice to either Nakajima's NK9 (Ha-45/Homare), or Mitsubishi's MK9 (Ha-43), both still under development. These engines were based on 14-cylinder (Nakajima Sakae and Mitsubishi Kinsei, respectively) engines converted to 18-cylinder powerplants. The early NK9 had less output but was already approved by the Navy for use on the Yokosuka P1Y Ginga bomber, while the larger MK9 promised more horsepower.

With the larger, more powerful engine, wing loading became an issue. The Navy requested at most 150 kg/m^{2}, but wanted 130 kg/m^{2}, which complicated design considerations further. With the NK9 it could achieve 150 kg/m^{2}, but with the less power it would not meet the specifications for maximum speed. With the MK9 the engineers concluded it could fulfill the requirements; however, production of the MK9 was delayed compared to the NK9, and the Japanese Navy instructed Mitsubishi to use the NK9.

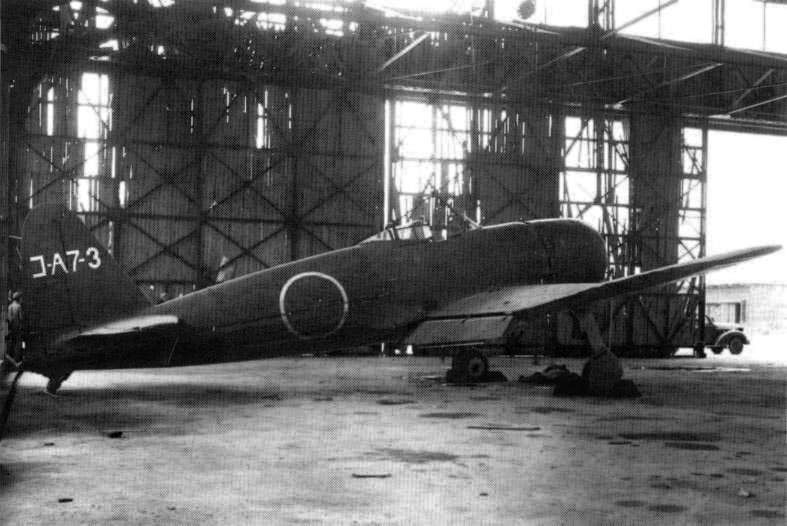
A side view of the A7M2

Work on the 17-Shi was further delayed by factories prioritizing A6M and Mitsubishi G4M medium bomber production as well as further work on A6M variants and addressing Raiden issues. As a result, the 17-Shi, which became the A7M1, officially flew for the first time on 6 May 1944, four years after development started. The aircraft demonstrated excellent handling and maneuverability, but was underpowered, as Mitsubishi engineers had feared, and with a top speed similar to the A6M5 Zero. It was a disappointment, and the Navy ordered development to stop on 30 July 1944, but Mitsubishi obtained permission for development to continue using the Ha-43 engine, flying with the completed Ha-43 on 13 October 1944. The A7M2 then achieved a top speed of 628 km/h (339 kn; 390 mph), while climb and other performance areas surpassed the Zero, leading the Navy to change its mind and adopt the aircraft. The A7M2 was also equipped with automatic combat flaps, used earlier on the Kawanishi N1K-J, significantly improving maneuverability.

In June 1945, ace pilot Saburō Sakai was ordered to test the prototype at Nagoya. He was favorably impressed.

== Variants ==
A7M1 Reppū
First prototype powered by a 2,000 hp (1,500 kW) Nakajima Homare 22 engine, with a maximum speed of 574 km/h (356 mph). The armament consisted of two 13.2 mm (.52 in) Type 3 machine guns and two 20 mm (.80 in) Type 99 autocannon in the wings. While featuring excellent manoeuvrability, the A7M1's Homare engine left it underpowered which resulted in its cancellation. Eight built.
A7M2 Reppū
Revised version powered by a 2,200 hp (1,600 kW) Mitsubishi Ha-43 engine, with a maximum speed of 627 km/h (389 mph). Armament the same as previous model, or four 20 mm (.80 in) Type 99 autocannon. The A7M2 was to be the main production aircraft of the A7M series. Three were converted from A7M1. One production type was under assembly at the end of the war.
A7M3 Reppū
Proposed land-based fighter version powered by a 2,250 hp (1,680 kW) mechanically driven three-speed supercharged Mitsubishi Ha-43 engine, with a maximum speed of 642 km/h (398 mph). The armament consisted of six 20 mm (.80 in) Type 99 cannons in the wings. Prototype under construction but was incomplete prior to end of war.
A7M3-J Reppū-Kai
Proposed land-based interceptor version powered by a 2,200 hp (1,600 kW) turbo-supercharged Mitsubishi Ha-43 engine including an inter-cooler, with a maximum speed of 648 km/h (402 mph). The armament consisted of six 30 mm (1.20 in) Type 5 autocannon, four wing-mounted & two oblique fuselage-mounted. Full-scale mock-up built, but no prototype.

== Production ==
A7M Production: Mitsubishi Jukogyo K.K
Year
Year	Jan.	Feb.	Mar.	Apr.	May	June	July	Aug.	Sept.	Oct.	Nov.	Dec.	Annual
1944				1	1	2	2	2	0	0	0	0	8
1945	0	0	0	0	0	0	0	1					1
Total													9

- Production was disrupted by an earthquake on 7 December 1944 in the Nagoya region, and Allied bombing raids of Nagoya on 11 March 1945, which caused the loss of full scale drawings and jigs for the A7M2 and Ki-83. This ceased the development of the A7M2 and the plane would never see combat.

The USSBS Report identifies nine aircraft (two A7M1 prototypes, seven A7M2 prototypes and service trials aircraft) while Francillon notes the same two A7M1 prototypes, seven A7M2 prototypes and service trials aircraft, but with one A7M2 final production build for a total of 10.

== Specifications (A7M2) ==
Data from Japanese Aircraft of the Pacific War

General characteristics

- Crew: One
- Length: 11.04 m (36 ft 3 in)
- Wingspan: 14 m (45 ft 11 in)
- Height: 4.28 m (14 ft 1 in)
- Wing area: 30.86 m^{2} (332.2 sq ft)
- Airfoil: root: MAC361 mod; tip: MAC361 mod
- Empty weight: 3,226 kg (7,112 lb)
- Gross weight: 4,720 kg (10,406 lb)
- Powerplant: 1 × Mitsubishi MK9C (unified :Ha-43) 18-cylinder air-cooled radial piston engine, 1,600 kW (2,200 hp) for take-off

800 kW (1,070 hp) at 1,000 m (3,300 ft)
1,300 kW (1,800 hp) at 6,000 m (20,000 ft)

- Propellers: 4-bladed constant-speed metal propeller

Performance

- Maximum speed: 628 km/h (390 mph, 339 kn) at 6,600 m (21,700 ft)
- Cruise speed: 417 km/h (259 mph, 225 kn) at 4,000 m (13,000 ft)
- Endurance: 2 hours 30 minutes at cruise + 30 minutes combat
- Service ceiling: 10,900 m (35,800 ft) (12,000 m (39,000 ft) from Samurai)
- Time to altitude: 6,000 m (20,000 ft) in 6 minutes 7 seconds
- Wing loading: 152.9 kg/m^{2} (31.3 lb/sq ft)
- Power/mass: 0.350 kW/kg (0.213 hp/lb)

Armament

- 2 × 13.2 mm (0.520 in) Type 3 machine guns in the wings (300 rpg) + 2 × 20 mm (0.787 in) Type 99 cannon in the wings (200 rpg) (A7M1)

or

- 4 × 20 mm (0.787 in) Type 99 cannon in the wings (200 rpg) (A7M2)

== See also ==
Related development

- Mitsubishi A6M Zero

Aircraft of comparable role, configuration, and era

- Grumman F6F Hellcat
- Grumman F8F Bearcat
- Hawker Sea Fury
- Kawanishi N1K
- Kawasaki Ki-100
- Nakajima Ki-84
- North American P-51 Mustang
- Republic P-47 Thunderbolt
- Vought F4U Corsair

Related lists

- List of military aircraft of Japan
- List of fighter aircraft

== Bibliography ==
- Angelucci, Enzo. The Rand McNally Encyclopedia of Military Aircraft, 1914–1980. San Diego, California: The Military Press, 1983. ISBN 0-517-41021-4.
- Francillon, Ph.D., René J. (1979) [1970]. Japanese Aircraft of the Pacific War (2nd ed.). London: Putnam. ISBN 0-370-30251-6.
- Green, William. Warplanes of the Second World War, Volume Three: Fighters. London: Macdonald & Co. (Publishers) Ltd., 1961 (seventh impression 1973). ISBN 0-356-01447-9.
