= 20 mm Polsten =

Polsten
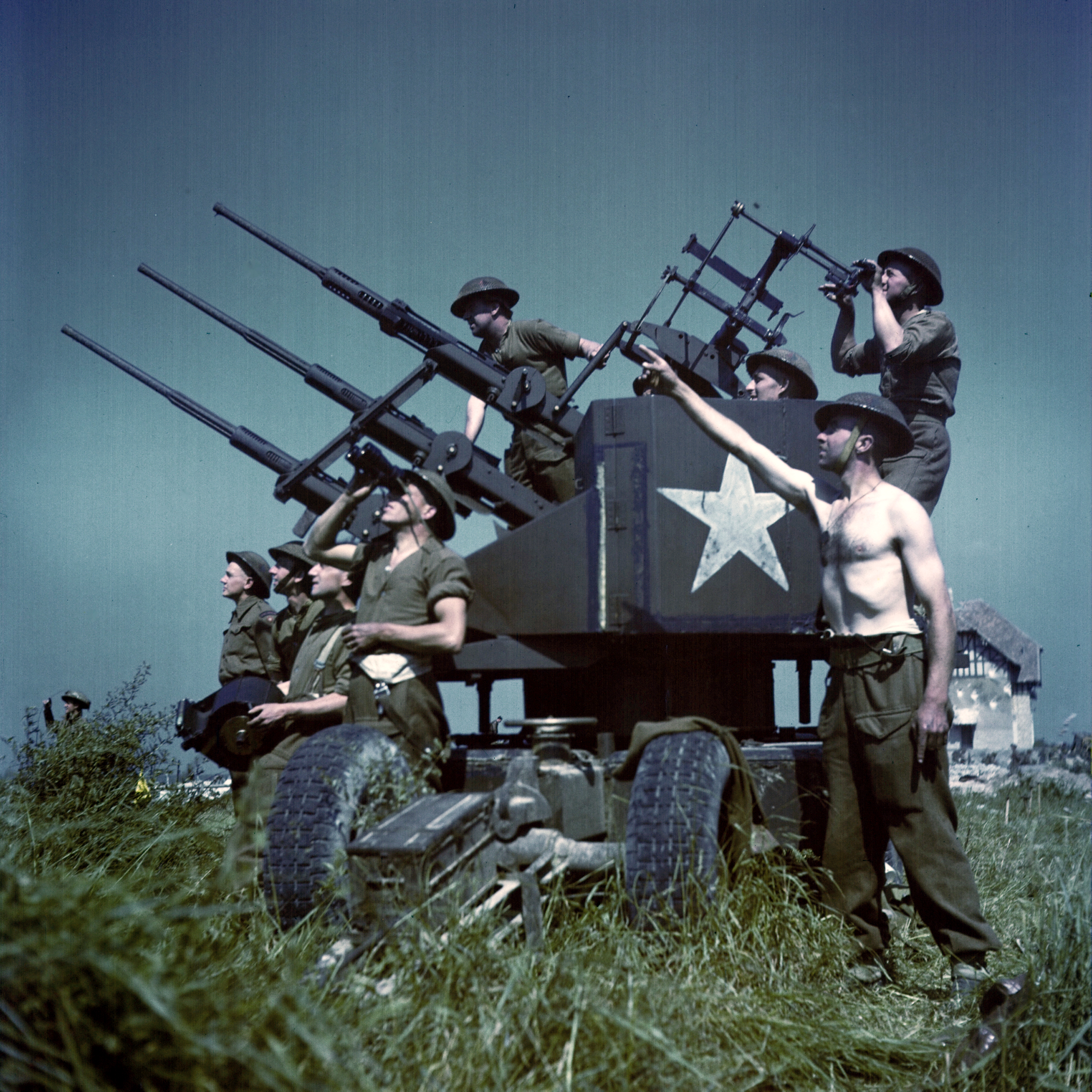
- A Canadian towed anti-aircraft mounting featuring three Polsten cannons.
- Type: Autocannon
- Place of origin: Poland; United Kingdom

Service history
- In service: 1944−1950s
- Used by: See § Users
- Wars: World War II; Yom Kippur War

Production history
- Designed: 1939−1941?
- Manufacturer: John Inglis
- Unit cost: £60−£70

Specifications
- Mass: 57 kg (126 lb)
- Length: 2.1 m (6 ft 11 in)
- Barrel length: 1.45 m (4 ft 9 in) (barrel)
- Calibre: 20 mm (0.78 in)
- Action: API blowback
- Rate of fire: 450 rpm
- Muzzle velocity: 830 m/s (2,700 ft/s)
- Effective firing range: 1,000 m (3,281 ft)
- Maximum firing range: 2,000 m (6,562 ft)
- Feed system: 60 round drum magazine or 30 round box magazine

The Polsten was a Polish development of the 20 mm Oerlikon gun. The Polsten was designed to be simpler and much cheaper to build than the Oerlikon, without reducing effectiveness. It was widely produced and used by the British Army and many allied and commonwealth forces, including production in Canada and Australia.

== Development ==
When Nazi Germany invaded Poland in 1939, the Polish design team evacuated to the UK and resumed work together with British designers. The need for the Polsten was apparently mooted in June 1941. It went into service in March 1944 alongside the Oerlikon. Both the Oerlikon and the Polsten used similar 60 round drum magazines, although the Polsten could also use a simpler box magazine with 30 rounds. It remained in service into the 1950s.

== Use ==
Compared to the Oerlikon's 250 parts, the Polsten had only 119 but it matched the Oerlikon in effectiveness and reliability. The simpler design of the Polsten cannon made its production much cheaper. The cost of one Oerlikon was about £350, while the cost of the Polsten was between £60 and £70. In January 1944, the 21st Army Group decided that only 20 mm Polsten guns would be used as a standard light anti-aircraft gun in place of the Oerlikon to simplify supply. It was used by the anti-aircraft platoons of some British infantry battalions during the Western European campaign of 1944–1945. It equipped airborne units for anti-aircraft use and was employed in Operation Market Garden. The gun was placed on a wheeled mounting that could be towed behind a jeep.

The Polsten gun was used on armoured vehicles equipped with anti-aircraft guns that were based on the Cromwell/Centaur tank and for the Skink anti-aircraft tank. The Polsten was also mounted on British LVTs and on early models of the Centurion tank, not coaxially with the main gun but in an independent mount on the left hand side of the turret. Various double, triple and quadruple mounts were developed. John Inglis Limited of Toronto, Ontario, in Canada produced many thousands of guns and some 500 quadruple mountings that saw limited service at the end of the war. These multiple mounts were both towed and truck-mounted. Polsten guns, magazines and ammunition boxes were also made in Australia by Holden's Woodville and Beverley plants during the war. They were used by the Australian Army onshore and on small boats. Several prototype gun mountings were also developed but did not see service.

== Users ==
- Israel − 180 in 1973
- United Kingdom
- Canada

== See also ==
- List of autocannon
- List of API blowback firearms
- Becker Type M2 20 mm cannon
- Polski Sten, the actual Polish derivate of the Sten gun
- Type 99 cannon

== Bibliography ==
- Axelrod, Alan (2007). "Antiaircraft weapons". In Kingston, Jack A. (ed.). Encyclopedia of World War II. Vol. 1. New York, NY: Facts on File, Inc. pp. 57−60. ISBN 978-0-8160-6022-1 – via Google Books.
- Kreis, John F. (1988). Air Warfare and Air Base air defense, 1914−1973. Washington, D.C.: United States Government Publishing Office. ISBN 0-912799-55-2.
