= Type 5 cannon =

- Type: Aircraft cannon
- Place of origin: Imperial Japanese Navy

Service history
- Wars: World War II

Specifications
- Mass: 70 kg (154 lb 5 oz)
- Length: 2,070 mm (81 in)
- Barrel length: 1,350 mm (53 in)
- Cartridge: 30 x 122 mm (345 g)
- Calibre: 30 mm (1.2 in)
- Action: Short recoil-operated
- Rate of fire: 500 rounds/min
- Muzzle velocity: 770 m/s (2,500 ft/s)
- Feed system: Belt

The 30 mm Type 5 cannon was a Japanese Navy autocannon used near the end of World War II. It was an indigenous 30 mm design with better performance than the Navy's earlier Oerlikon-derived Type 2 or the Imperial Army's Browning-derived Ho-155, although it was considerably heavier. The Type 5 was to have become the standard fighter cannon of the Japanese Navy – four would have been mounted on the J7W Shinden – but by the end of the war had seen use on only a few aircraft, including variants of the Mitsubishi J2M and Yokosuka P1Y.

== Specifications ==
- Caliber: 30 mm (1.2 in)
- Ammunition: 30 × 122 (345 g)
- Weight: 70 kg (155 lb)
- Rate of fire: 500 rounds/min

Cannon was constructed by engineer Masaya Kawamura, in Nihon Tokushu-Ko KK, and produced in Navy factories in Toyokawa and also in small numbers KK Nihon Seikojo and Nihon Tokushu-Ko KK.

== See also ==
- Type 2 cannon
- Type 99 cannon
- Ho-155 cannon
- Ho-105 cannon
