= Oerlikon 20 mm cannon =

Series of autocannons

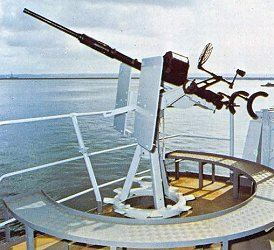
- Oerlikon 20 mm cannon in French service
- Type: Autocannon
- Place of origin: Switzerland

Service history
- In service: 1937–present
- Wars: World War II; Nigerian Civil War

Production history
- Designer: Reinhold Becker
- Designed: 1935
- Manufacturer: Oerlikon; Oerlikon Contraves
- Produced: 1937−1995
- No. built: 124,734
- Variants: Oerlikon FF; MG FF cannon

Specifications
- Mass: L70; Total gun barrel weight: 68.04 kilograms (150.0 lb); Minus breech mechanism: 20.865 kg (46.00 lb); L85; Empty: 92.0 kilograms (202.8 lb); Loaded with 200 rounds: 182.0 kg (401.2 lb)
- Barrel length: L70; Overall: 2,210 mm (87 in); Barrel length: 1,400 mm (55 in); L85; Overall: n/a Barrel length: 1,700 mm (67 in)
- Shell: L70: 20×110mmRB; L85: 20×128mm
- Shell weight: HE: 123 g (4.3 oz); HE/T: 116 g (4.1 oz)
- Caliber: 20 mm (0.79 in)
- Barrels: Single barrel (progressive RH parabolic twist, 9 grooves)
- Action: API blowback Gas operated, power reserve loading
- Elevation: Manual, -15°/+90°
- Traverse: Manual, full 360°
- Rate of fire: L70: Cyclic: 450 rounds per minute Practical: 250-320 rounds per minute L85: Cyclic: 900 to 1,000 rounds per minute
- Muzzle velocity: L70: 820 m/s (2,700 ft/s); L85: 1,050 m/s (3,400 ft/s)
- Effective firing range: Against low-flying aircraft (HE round); L70: 914 m (1,000 yd); L85: 1,500 m (1,600 yd)
- Maximum firing range: HE round at 45° L70: 4,389 m (4,800 yd); L85: 6,800 m (7,400 yd)
- Feed system: Cylindrical magazine holding 60 rounds; later adjusted for belt-fed gun

The Oerlikon 20 mm cannon is a series of autocannons based on an original German Becker Type M2 20 mm cannon design that appeared very early in World War I. Widely produced by Oerlikon Contraves and by others, its various models saw service with both Allied and Axis forces during World War II. Versions of the cannon are still in use in 2026.

== API blowback-operated models ==
=== History ===
==== Origins ====
During World War I, German industrialist Reinhold Becker developed a 20 mm caliber cannon, known now as the 20 mm Becker using the advanced primer ignition blowback (API blowback) method of operation. This used a 20×70mmRB cartridge and had a cyclic rate of fire of 300 rpm. It was used on a limited scale as an aircraft gun on Luftstreitkräfte warplanes, and an anti-aircraft gun towards the end of that war.

Because the Treaty of Versailles banned further production of such weapons in Germany, the patents and design works were transferred in 1919 to the Swiss firm SEMAG (Seebach Maschinenbau Aktien Gesellschaft) based near Zürich. SEMAG continued development of the weapon, and in 1924 had produced the SEMAG L, a heavier weapon (43 kg) that fired more powerful 20×100mmRB ammunition at a slightly higher rate of fire, 350 rpm.

In 1924, SEMAG failed. The Oerlikon firm, named after the Zürich suburb of Oerlikon where it was based, then acquired all rights to the weapon, plus the manufacturing equipment and the employees of SEMAG.

==== Oerlikon ====
In 1927 the Oerlikon S was added to the existing product line. This fired a still larger cartridge (20×110mmRB) to achieve a muzzle velocity of 830 m/s (versus 490 m/s for the original Becker 20×70mmRB gun), at the cost of increased weight and a reduced rate of fire (280 rpm). The purpose of this development was to improve the performance of the gun as an anti-tank and anti-aircraft weapon, which required a higher muzzle velocity. An improved version known as the 1S followed in 1930.

Three sizes of gun with their different ammunition and barrel length, but very similar mechanisms, continued to be developed in parallel. In 1930 Oerlikon reconsidered the application of its gun in aircraft and introduced the AF and AL, designed to be used in flexible mounts, i.e. manually aimed by a gunner. The 15-round box magazine used by earlier versions of the gun was replaced by drum magazine holding 15 or 30 rounds.

In 1935 it made an important step by introducing a series of guns designed to be mounted in or on the wings of fighter aircraft. Designated with FF for Flügelfest meaning 'wing-mounted', these weapons were again available in the three sizes, with designations FF, FFL and FFS. The FF fired a slightly larger cartridge than the AF, 20×72mmRB, but the major improvement in these weapons was a significant increase in rate of fire. The FF weighed 24 kg and achieved a muzzle velocity of 550 to 600 m/s with a rate of fire of 520 rpm. The FFL of 30 kg fired a projectile at a muzzle velocity of 675 m/s with a rate of fire of 500 rpm. And the FFS, which weighed 39 kg, delivered a high muzzle velocity of 830 m/s at a rate of 470 rpm.

Apart from changes to the design of the guns for wing-mounting and remote control, larger drums were introduced as it would not be possible to exchange magazines in flight. For the FF series 45, 60, 75 and 100 (and a rarely used 150) drum magazines were available, but most users chose the 30 or 60-round drum.

The 1930s were a period of global re-armament, and a number of foreign firms took licenses for the Oerlikon family of aircraft cannon. In France, Hispano-Suiza manufactured development of the FFS as the Hispano-Suiza HS.7 and Hispano-Suiza HS.9, for installation between the cylinder banks of its V-12 engines. In Germany, Ikaria further developed the FF gun as the MG FF, firing 20×80mmRB ammunition. And the Imperial Japanese Navy, after evaluating all three guns, ordered developments of the FF and FFL as the Type 99-1 and Type 99-2.

The incorporation of the improvements of the FFS in a new anti-aircraft gun produced, in 1938, the Oerlikon SS. Oerlikon realized further improvements in rate of fire on the 1SS of 1942, and the 2SS of 1945 which achieved 650 rpm. However, it was the original SS gun which was widely adopted as anti-aircraft gun, being especially widely used by Allied navies during World War II.

This gun used a 400-grain (26-gram) charge of IMR 4831 smokeless powder to propel a 2,000-grain (130-gram) projectile at 2,800 feet (850 meters) per second.

==== World War II ====
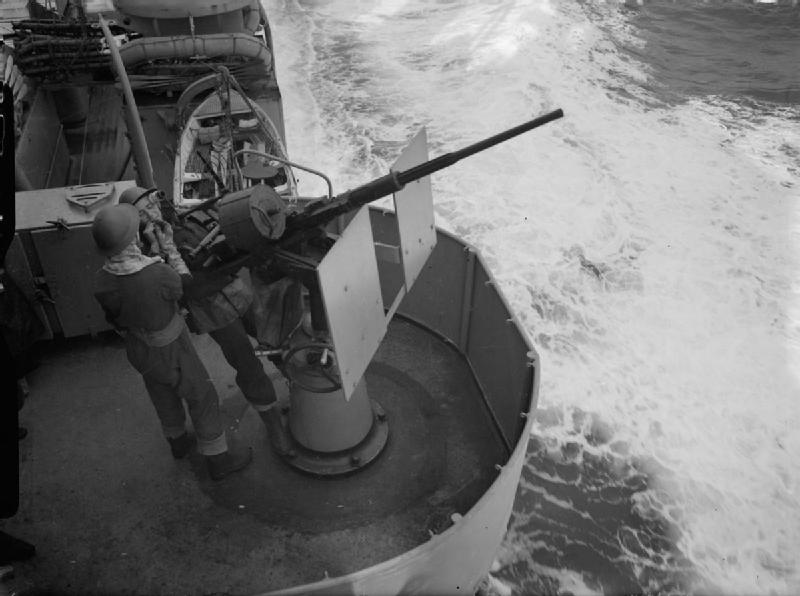
Royal Navy Oerlikon gunners at their gun mount aboard HMS Dido in 1942

The Oerlikon FF was installed as armament on some fighters of the 1930s, such as the Polish PZL P.24G. Locally produced derivatives of the Oerlikon cannon were used much more extensively, on aircraft, on ships and on land. In the air, the Ikaria MG FF was used as armament on a number of German aircraft, of which the most famous is the Messerschmitt Bf 109. The Japanese Navy similarly used their copy of the FF, designated the Type 99 Mark 1 cannon on a number of types including the Mitsubishi A6M Zero. Later in the war, they also equipped fighters including the Zero with the Type 99 Mark 2, a version of the more powerful and faster-firing Oerlikon FFL.

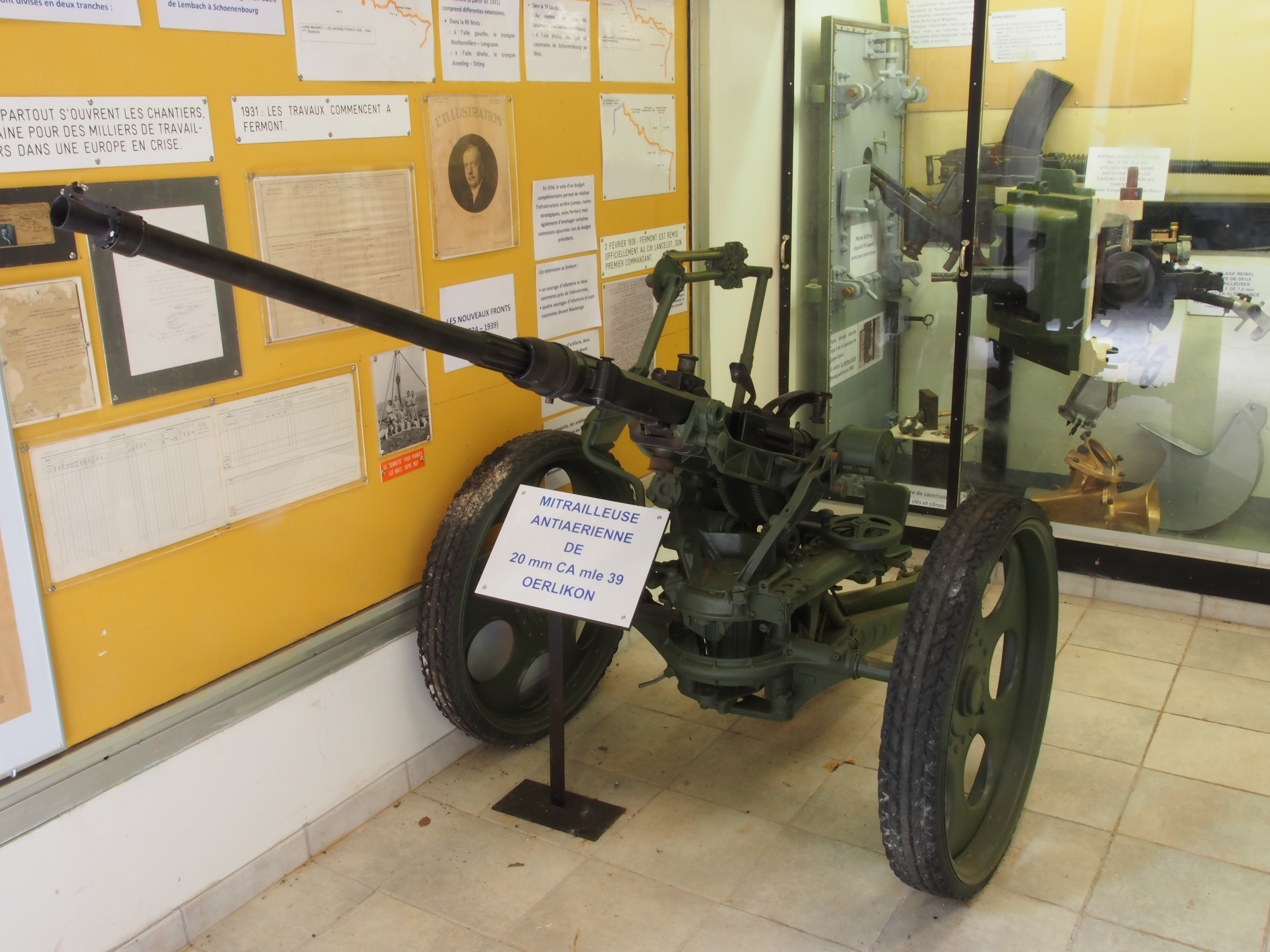
Oerlikon AA M^{le} 39 AA gun at Fort de Fermont.

The French firm of Hispano-Suiza was a manufacturer of aircraft engines, and it marketed the moteur-canon combination of its 12X and 12Y engines with a H.S.7 or H.S.9 cannon installed between the cylinder banks. The gun fired through the hollow propeller hub, this being elevated above the crankcase by the design of the gearing. Such armament was installed on the Morane-Saulnier M.S.406 and some other types. Similar German installations of the MG FF were not successful.

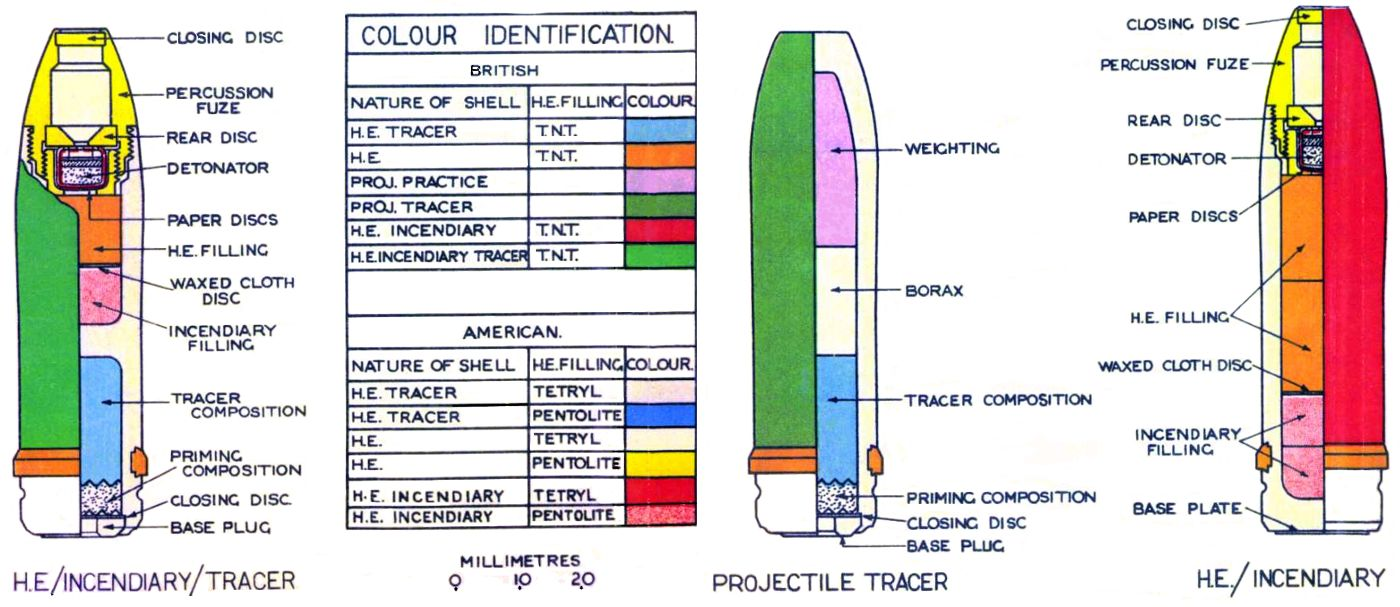
Diagrams showing basic design and color-coding of British HE/incendiary, tracer and HE/incendiary/tracer shells for the 20 mm Oerlikon gun

The Oerlikon became best known in its naval applications. Initially the Oerlikon was not looked upon favorably by the Royal Navy as a short-range anti-aircraft gun. In 1937–1938 Lord Louis Mountbatten, then a captain in the Royal Navy, advocated within the Royal Navy to set up an unprejudiced trial for the Oerlikon 20 mm gun, but was unsuccessful. It was not until the Commander-in-Chief of the Home Fleet, Admiral Sir Roger Backhouse, was appointed First Sea Lord that Mountbatten's efforts bore fruit. During the first half of 1939 a contract for 1,500 guns was placed in Switzerland. However, due to delays and then later the fall of France in June 1940, only 109 guns reached the United Kingdom. All Oerlikon guns imported from Switzerland, in 1940, were mounted on various gun carriages to serve as light AA-guns on land.

Just a few weeks before the fall of France, the Oerlikon factory approved manufacture of their gun in the United Kingdom, under licence. The Royal Navy managed to smuggle out the necessary drawings and documents from Zürich. The production of the first British-made Oerlikon guns started in Ruislip, London, at the end of 1940. The first guns were delivered to the Royal Navy in March or April, 1941. The RAF Regiment made extensive use of Oerlikon guns in the anti-aircraft role. These were the principal armament for its light anti-aircraft squadrons in North Africa, the Middle East, Italy, and north western Europe, until the introduction of the Bofors 40/L60 40 mm gun from 1943, although many squadrons retained a mix of guns until the end of World War 2. Squadrons in the Far East were equipped exclusively with Oerlikons.

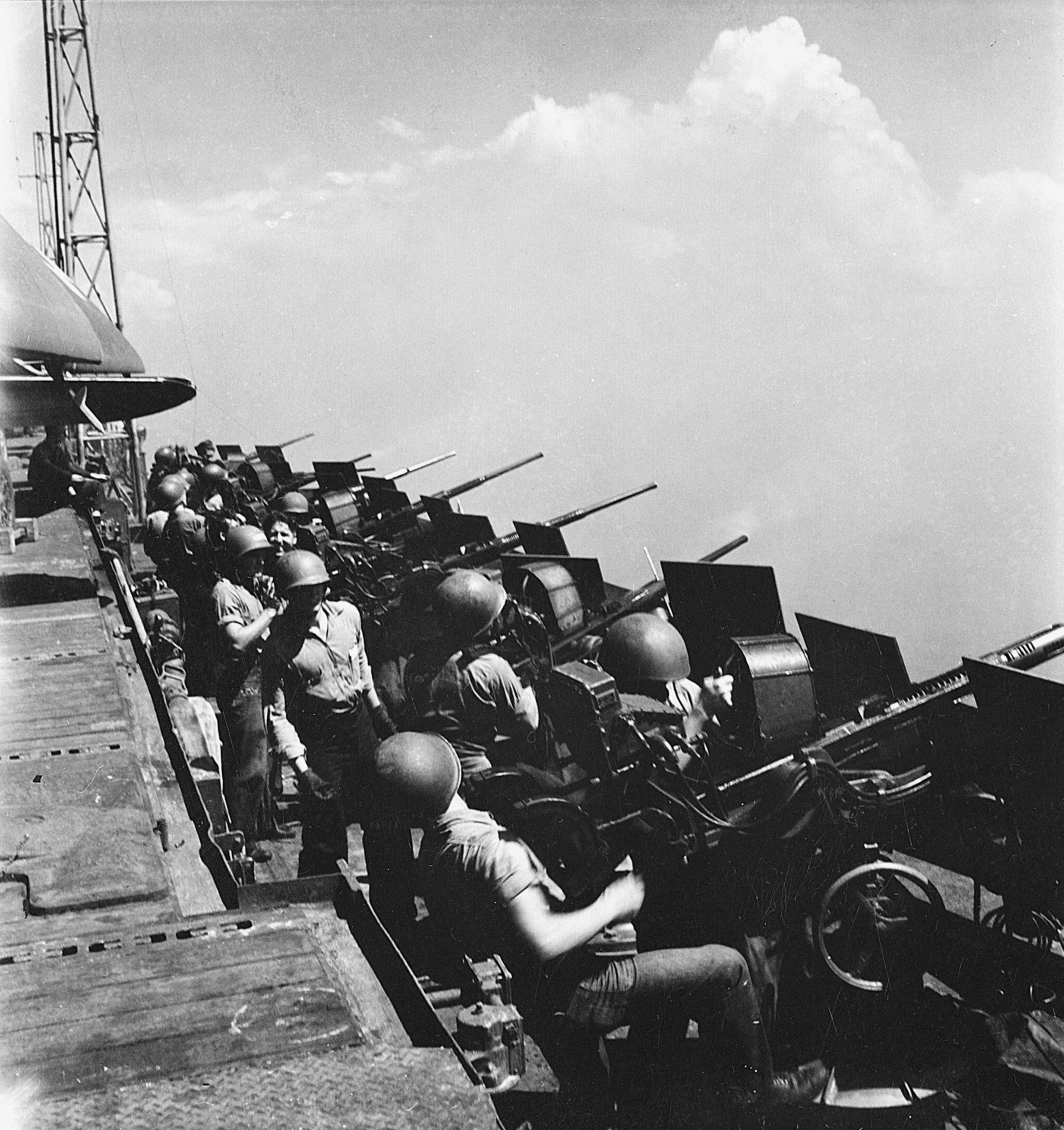
1945, a row of 20 mm Oerlikon guns aboard the Essex-class aircraft carrier USS Hornet

The Oerlikon gun was installed aboard United States Navy ships from 1942, replacing the M2 Browning machine gun, which lacked range and firepower, and largely superseding the 1.1"/75 caliber gun, which was heavier and had less mechanical reliability. It became famous in the naval anti-aircraft role, providing an effective defense at short ranges (in practice up to 1.5 km) at which heavier guns had difficulty tracking a target. The gun was eventually abandoned as a major anti-air weapon due to its lack of stopping power against heavy aircraft and against Japanese kamikaze attacks during the Pacific War. It was largely superseded by the Bofors 40 mm gun and the 3"/50 Mark 22 gun. It provided a useful increase in firepower over the .50 cal machine gun when adapted and fitted to some aircraft. However, it had some problems with jamming in the ammunition feed.

The Royal Canadian Navy popularised the use of the Oerlikon gun as an anti-ship and anti-submarine gun – while it was not effective against the armour of most larger ships, it was used extensively and effectively against U-boats, and on the decks of larger ships. A handful of corvettes were fitted with the weapon toward the end of the war, but it appeared more commonly on frigates and destroyers at the time.

The Oerlikon was also used as the basis for the Polsten gun, designed by Polish engineers in exile in the United Kingdom. The gun went into service in 1944, and was used well into the 1950s, among other uses, on Centaur tanks and early model Centurion tanks.

Romania purchased 45 pieces from Germany during the first half of World War II.

==== Post-war ====
It is still in use today on some naval units, nominally as a last-recourse anti-air weapon, but mainly used for firing warning shots or incapacitating small vessels.

Vietnam War

In the Vietnam War, the US Navy used a mix of 20 mm weapons. The original Oerlikons were still in use aboard some vessels early in the conflict, especially on Riverine patrol boats, but were increasingly replaced by the belt-fed Colt Mk 12 and Mk 16 cannons, which were derived from the Hispano-Suiza HS.404.

Tanker Wars

During the 1980s Tanker war phase of the Iran–Iraq war, Oerlikon 20 mm guns were used by smaller Gulf navies & some Western escorts. These weapons were often mounted on fast patrol boats & used to fire warning shots or deter Iranian small-boat harassment. Though largely obsolete against air threats by this point, the Oerlikon remained viable against soft targets at sea.

Falklands War

In the 1982 Falklands War, the Royal Navy found itself short of modern Close-in weapon system (CIWS). As a result, several auxiliary vessels, including some requisitioned ships, were hastily fitted with WWII era Oerlikon 20 mm mounts for defence. Some Royal Fleet Auxiliary (RFA) ships also received twin mounts of gas-operated Oerlikon GAM-BO1. Their limited ability during the conflict reinforced the Royal Navy’s urgent need for modern radar-guided defensive systems.

=== Description ===
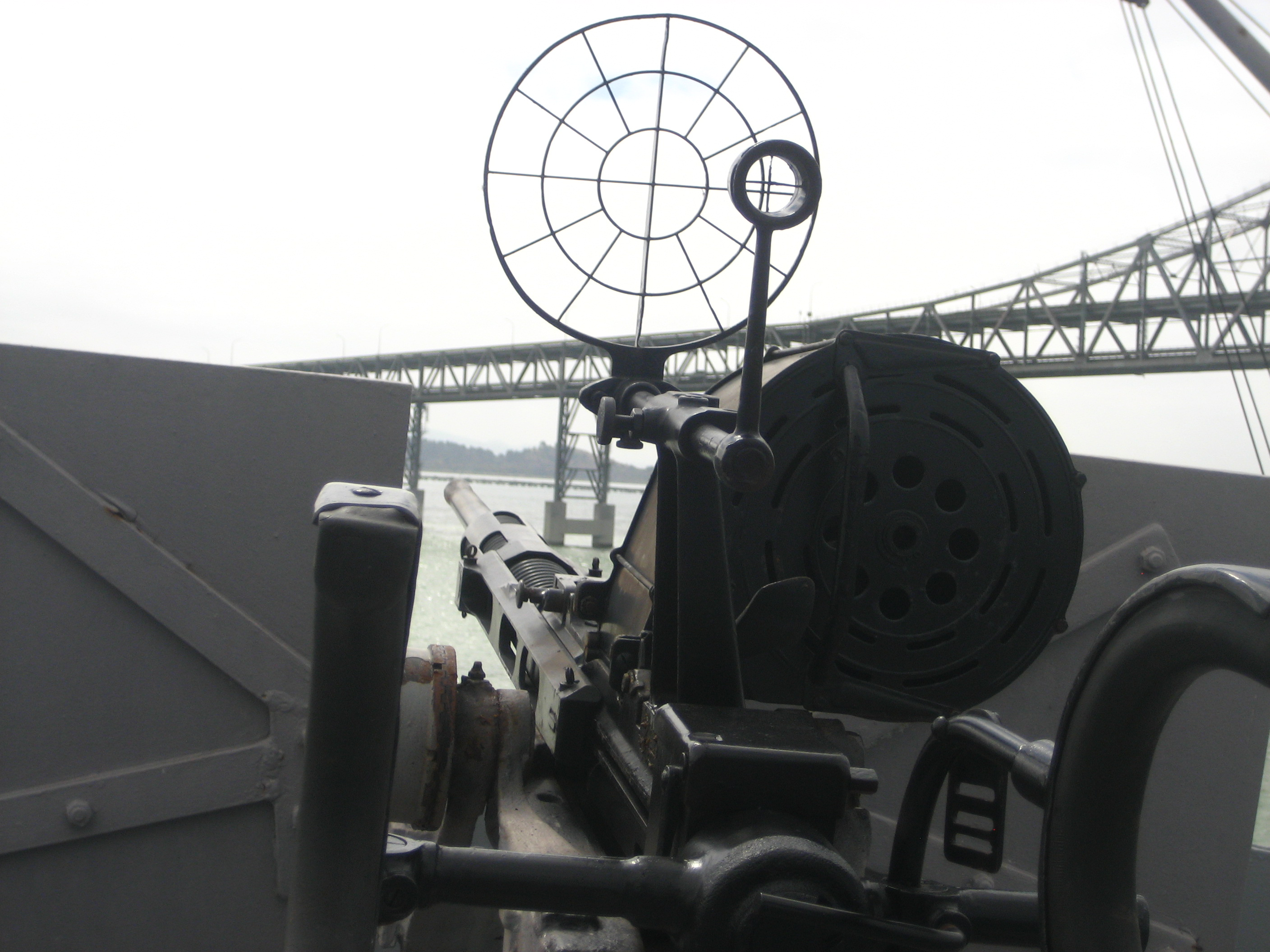
The aiming sight of the Oerlikon gun

Unlike most high-powered autocannons, the Oerlikon and its derivatives have a blowback mechanism: the bolt is not locked to the breech of the gun at the moment of firing. Non-locking, simple blowback designs are commonplace in much lighter weapons, such as small-caliber semi-automatic pistols. No locking is required, as with such low-power cartridges the static inertia of the bolt or bolt and slide - the physical tendency of heavy components to resist rapid acceleration - is adequate to ensure that the projectile has left the muzzle and the gas pressure in the barrel is down to a safe level before the breech opens (while the bolt spring also resists the opening of the breech, in practical terms its contribution is too small to be relevant).

In contrast, 20mm cartridges are far too powerful, and efficient autocannon barrels too long, for this basic system to be practical; so the Oerlikon uses Advanced Primer Ignition (API) to augment the resistance of the bolt. In API blowback weapons, the firing pin fires the cartridge while the bolt is still traveling forward so that the gas pressure has to overcome the forward momentum of the bolt as well, before it can push it to the rear. To facilitate this, the Oerlikon's chamber is longer than needed to contain the cartridge, and the front-end of the bolt, which is the same diameter as the case, actually enters this extended chamber behind the cartridge before firing. As a result when firing occurs, the forward force of the bolt and spring acts against the force of the propellant gases until the latter overcome the former and start pushing case, bolt and spring backwards. If the bolt had stopped at the mouth of the chamber as in a simple blowback gun, this momentum would have been neutralized; instead thanks to the continuous movement the momentum acts to counter the propellant gases and slow the rearward travel of cartridge and bolt.

Synergistically with this, a second advantage of this unusual arrangement is that after firing the bolt and case have a short, but significant, distance to travel rearwards before the bolt-end re-emerges and the case in turn begins to leave the chamber; and this in combination with the retardation of the rearward travel provides sufficient time for gas pressure to drop to the necessary safe level. This system permits blowback to be used in far more powerful weapons than normal. Nevertheless, compared to guns with a locking mechanism, a fairly heavy bolt must be employed; while to give this heavy bolt sufficient forward speed, a large spring is required (and Oerlikons, distinctively, have this component wrapped around their barrels.) These features will limit the rate of fire of such guns, unless other steps are taken—as in the final model of the Japanese 99 Mark 2.

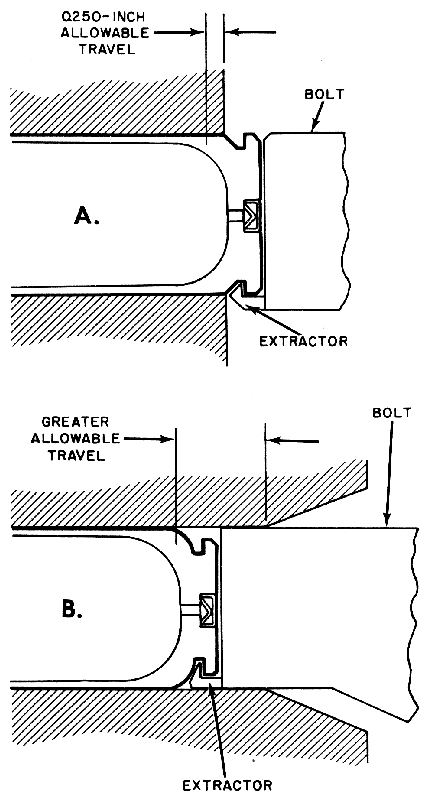
Difference of normal and rebated rim cartridge in blowback operation

This unique chamber and bolt design necessitates the use of a characteristically shaped cartridge: the case has straight sides, very little neck, and a rebated rim. The straight sides allows the case to slide back and forward in the cylindrical chamber. The neck is not supported while this happens and therefore expands when the case is fired, and the rebated rim allows the face of the bolt, with its extractor claw hooked over the rim, to fit within the chamber. To ease the motion of the case, the ammunition needed to be greased, which was a drawback of the Oerlikon cannon. An alternative developed during World War II was the so-called fluted chamber, which had grooves that allowed propellant gas to seep between the chamber wall and the case, taking over the role of the grease.

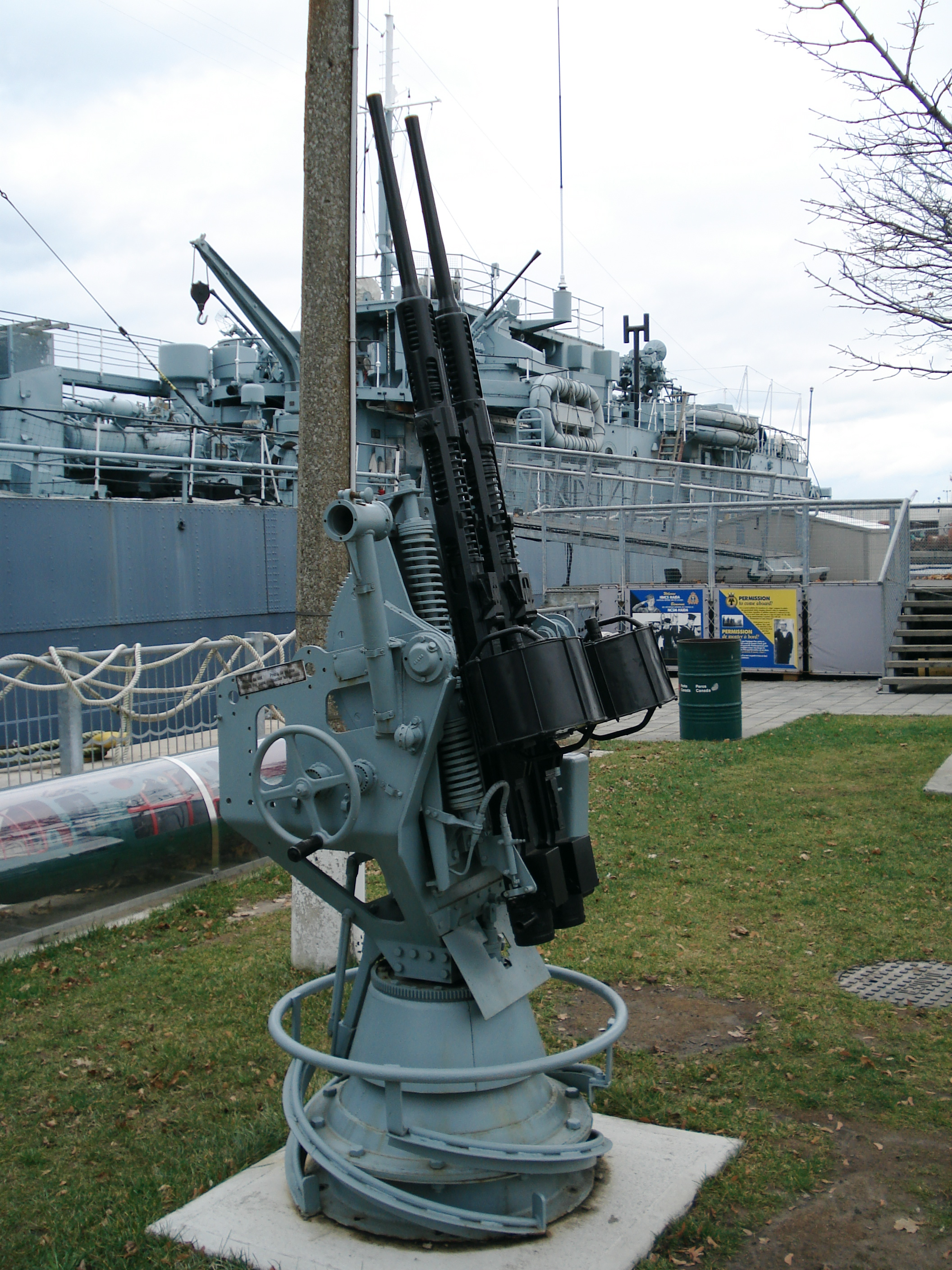
Side view of the twin Oerlikon gun mount

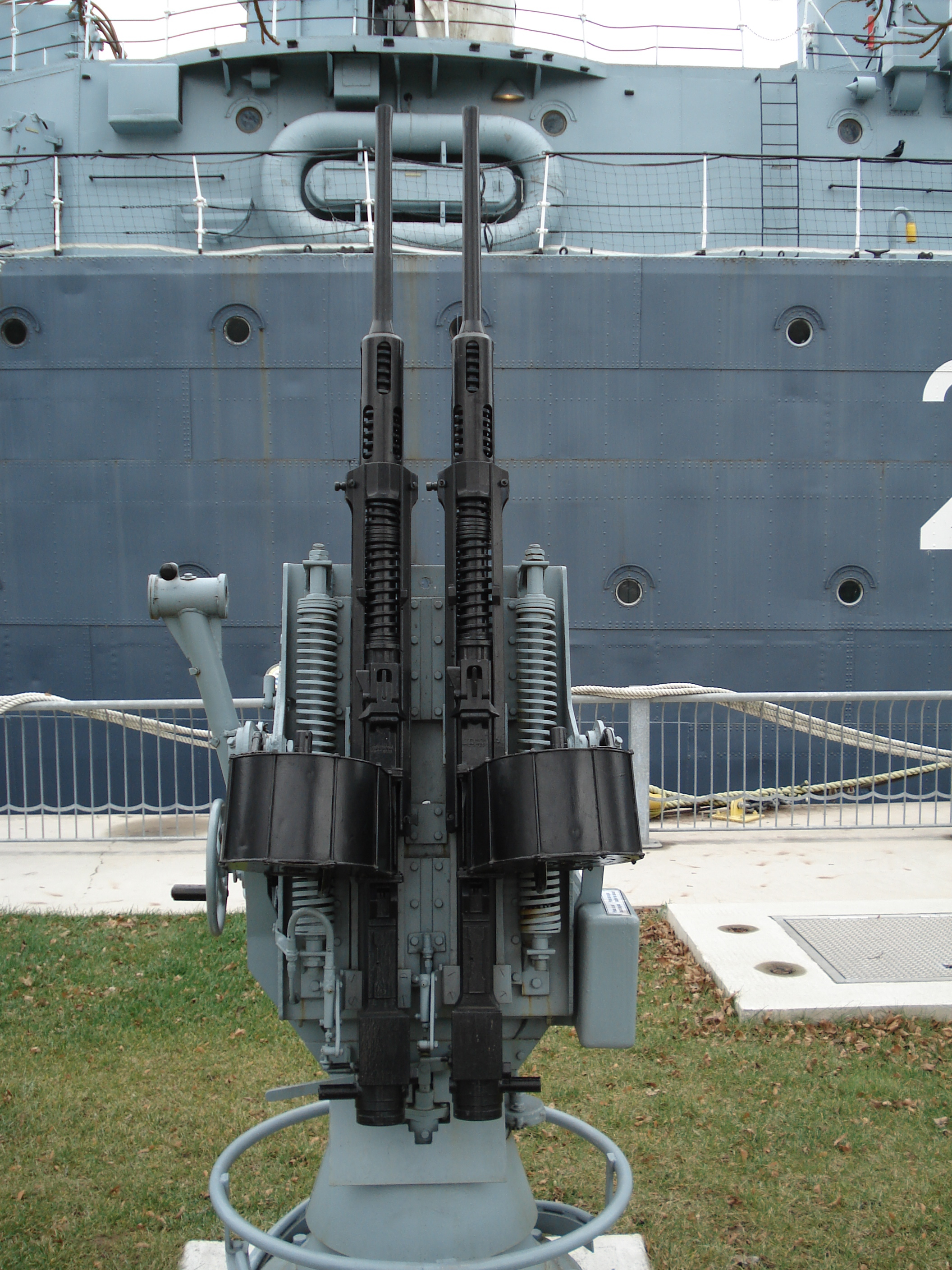
Rear view of the twin Oerlikon gun mount

A twin Oerlikon gun mount from the Tribal-class destroyer HMCS Haida

Ammunition feed is typically by a 60-round drum magazine on the top of the gun. During sustained firing, the magazine must be frequently changed, reducing the effective rate of fire. Belt-fed versions of the gun were developed to overcome this limitation. A trigger in the right-hand grip controls fire. Used cartridges are ejected from below the breech.

Different nations and services operated a number of mounting types for the same basic gun. In a typical single-barrel naval version, it is free-swinging on a fixed pedestal mounting with a flat armored shield affording some protection for the crew. The cannon is aimed and fired by a gunner using, in its simplest form, a ring-and-bead sight. The gunner is attached to the weapon by a waist-belt and shoulder supports. For this reason, some mountings existed with a height-adjustment feature to compensate for different sized gunners. A "piece chief" designates targets and the feeder changes exhausted magazines.

During World War II, twin and quadruple Oerlikon mounts were developed, both for army and for navy use. The British Navy operated a hydraulically operated twin-gun mount. The US Navy operated a quad mount developed for PT boats by Elco Naval Division, Electric Boat Company, called the Elco "Thunderbolt" mount. Prototypes were built and tested in late 1942 and operationally deployed on several Elco PT Boats in the Mediterranean. It was also placed experimentally on the battleships Arkansas, Colorado, Maryland, West Virginia, Washington, Massachusetts, and training ship Wyoming.

=== Variants ===
| Type | F | L | S | FFF | FFL | FFS |
|---|---|---|---|---|---|---|
| Caliber | 20 mm | | | | | |
| Action | API blowback | | | | | |
| Weight [kg] | 30 | 43 | 62 | 24 | 30 | 39 |
| Length [mm] | 1,350 | 1,820 | 2,120 | 1,350 | 1,880 | 2,120 |
| Barrel length [mm] | 800 | 1,200 | 1,400 | 760 | 1,200 | 1,400 |
| Rate of Fire [rpm] | 450 | 350 | 280 | 520 | 500 | 470 |
| Muzzle velocity [m/s] | 550- 575 | 670- 700 | 835- 870 | 550- 600 | 675- 750 | 830 |
| Cartridge type | 20×70RB | 20×101RB | 20×110RB | 20×72RB | 20x101RB | 20x110RB |
| Shell weight | 127g | | | | | |
| Feed system | Box magazine 15 rounds | | | Drums of 30, 45, 60, 75, 100 rounds or box magazine of 15 rounds | | |

== Gas-operated models ==
Although guns with blowback action had played an important part in WW2, it was obvious that something better was needed, especially for the universal demand for a high rate of fire. The blowback mechanism requires a careful balance between the force of the shell being fired and the operational timing of the mechanism. In the Oerlikon designs, these timing demands resulted in a relatively slow-cycling weapon.

As a response to this demand, Oerlikon developed "power reserve loading" action, introducing a gas-operated mechanism to unlock the breech. The gun produced to this design after the close of hostilities of WW2, and was called the 5TG, and shortly thereafter, the KAB. It was the first Oerlikon gun design that differed radically from the original Becker design.

Shortly after the War, Oerlikon began development of another gas-operated autocannon, 204-Gk, presently KAA. Both 5TG (KAB) and 204-Gk (KAA) uses 20mm×128 ammunition cartridge being developed by Oerlikon in 1943.

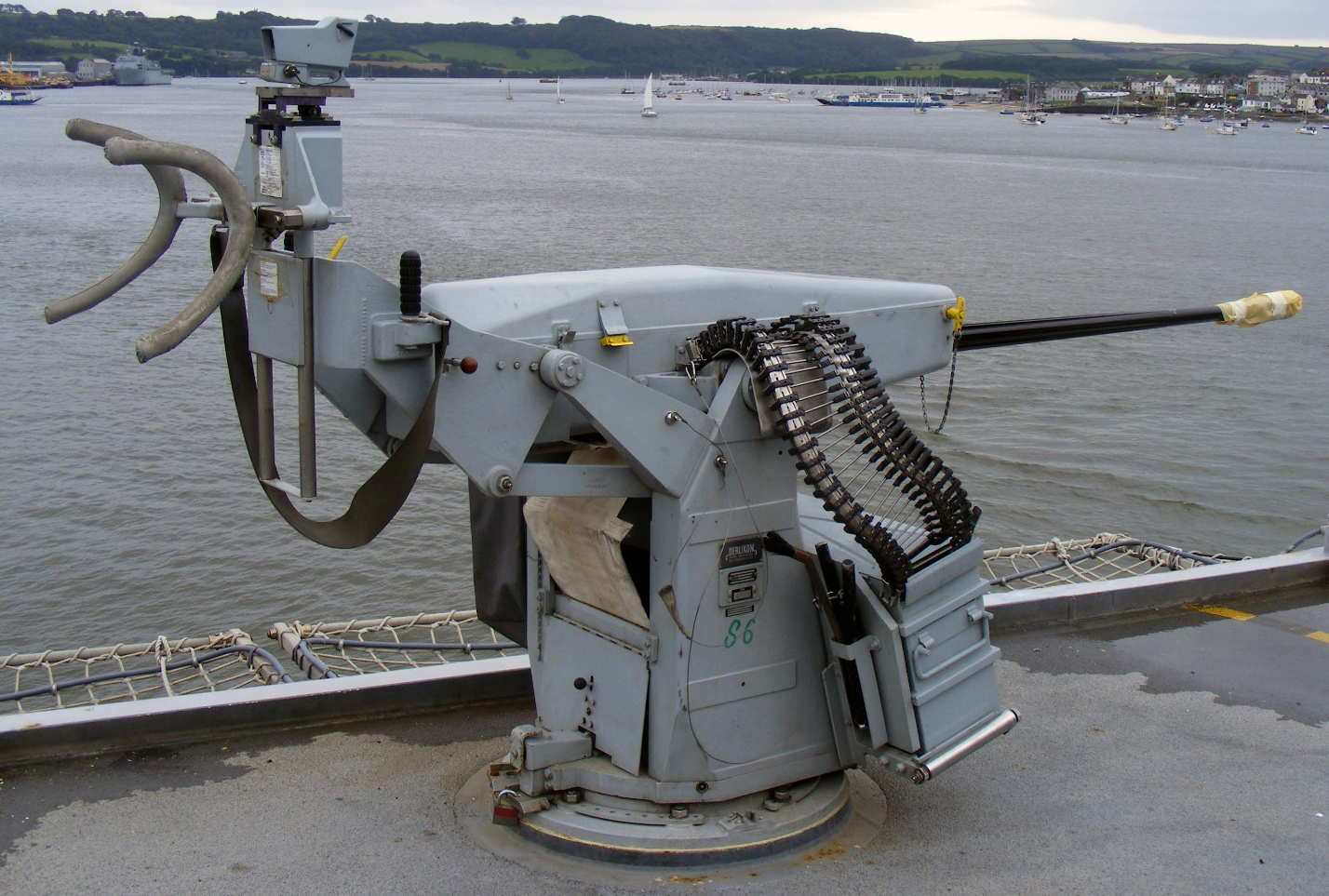
GAM-B01, shipboard mount with single KAA

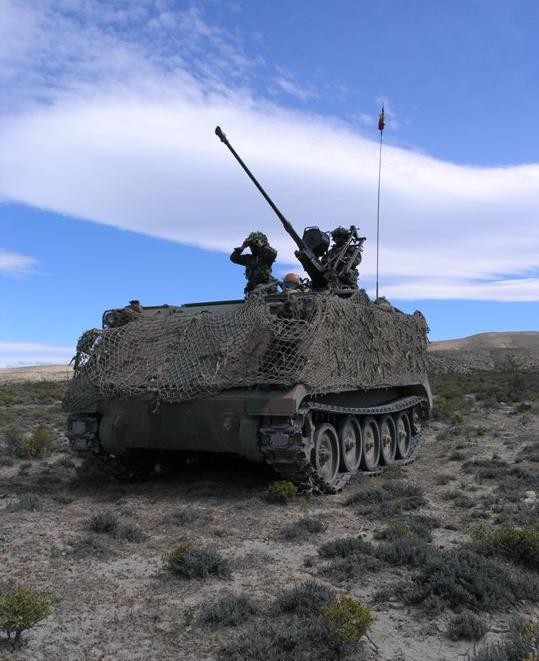
GAI-B01 with single KAA mounted on a M113

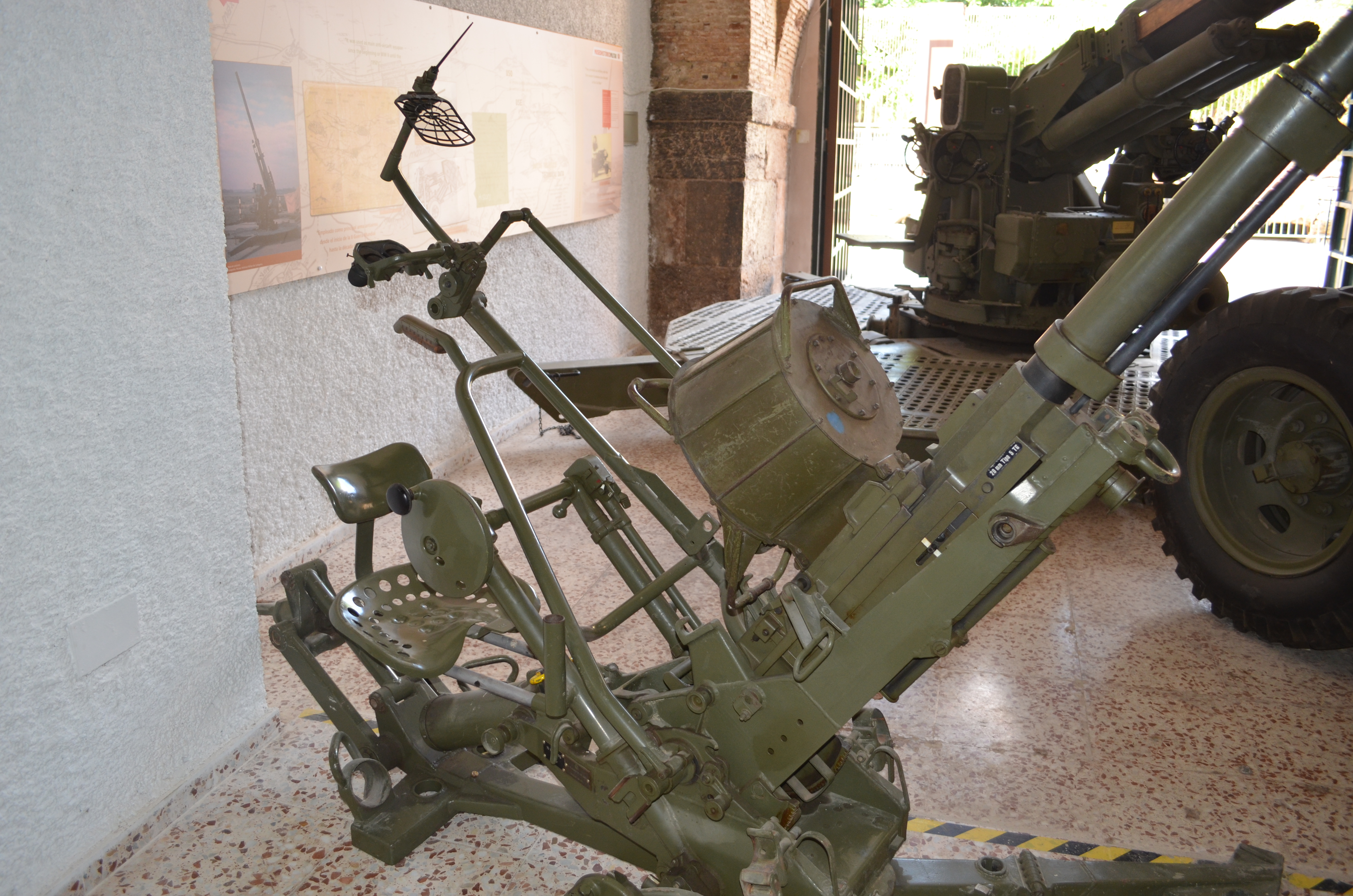
High-angle gun mount with single KAB

== See also ==
- List of autocannon
- List of API blowback firearms
- 20mm caliber
- 2 cm Flak 30/38/Flakvierling
- 20 mm modèle F2 gun
- 25 mm Hotchkiss anti-aircraft gun
- Hispano-Suiza HS.404
- Type 96 25 mm AT/AA gun
- Type 99 cannon
