= Nakajima Ki-201 =

Japanese jet fighter-attacker project

Ki-201 "Karyū"
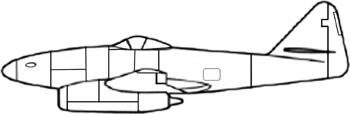
- Nakajima Ki-201 "Karyū"

General information
- Type: Fighter/Attack aircraft
- Manufacturer: Nakajima Aircraft Company
- Designer: Iwao Shibuya
- Status: Cancelled
- Number built: 0

The Nakajima Ki-201 Karyū (火龍, Fire Dragon) was a Japanese jet fighter/attack aircraft project designed during the final stages of World War II and remained unbuilt.

The development of the Karyū was heavily influenced by Nazi Germany's Messerschmitt Me 262, the first operational jet-powered fighter aircraft. Unlike the more compact Nakajima Kikka, which was requested by the Imperial Japanese Navy, the design of the Karyū was considerably larger, slightly more so than the Me 262 itself, and shared a closer resemblance to the German aircraft overall. The proposal was met with an order from the Imperial Japanese Army during late 1944; it was stipulated that the Karyū should be capable of attaining 800–1,000 km/h (500–620 mph), an altitude of 12,000 m (39,000 ft), and at least 800–1,000 km (500–620 mi) range. Basic drawings for the entire aircraft were completed in June 1945; the first prototype Karyū was at one point set to be completed by December 1945 as well as 18 pre-production aircraft by March 1946. However, the programme was terminated following the Surrender of Japan in August 1945.

== Development ==
The origins of the Karyū can be traced back to the development of the world's first jet-powered fighter aircraft, the Messerschmitt Me 262. Trials of the Me 262 conducted in 1942 had been witnessed by a Japanese military attaché in Nazi Germany and enthusiastically reported back to the Japanese government. Domestic experimentation with turbojet engine technology was initiated as early as the winter of 1941-42; during 1943, a Japanese technical mission to Germany selected the BMW 003 axial-flow turbojet for development in Japan. Despite the loss of a submarine-bourne shipment of engines, tooling, and technical information sent from Germany, the separate arrival of some engineering notes and photographs of the BMW 003 meant that Japan did receive at least an incomplete set of blueprints to assist their efforts.

In September 1944, the Imperial Japanese Navy issued a request to Nakajima to develop a similar aircraft that would be suitable for use as a fast attack aircraft; this resulted in the Nakajima Kikka, an aircraft that was meant to be effectively an equivalent to the Me 262, however, the similarities between the two aircraft were very limited. In contrast, the Kikka was not only considerably smaller but also unrelated to the Ki-201 Karyū, which was designed by a team headed by the aeronautical engineer Iwao Shibuya, who opted to base it considerably closely to the German aircraft, being eight percent larger.

During late 1944, the Karyū proposal received an order from the Imperial Japanese Army. The stipulated performance requirements included a maximum speed of 800–1,000 km/h (500–620 mph), a maximum altitude of 12,000 m (39,000 ft), and a range of 800–1,000 km (500–620 mi). Development proceeded, by June 1945, basic drawings of the aircraft had been completed. Nakajima anticipated the completion of the first prototype Karyū by December 1945, while the first 18 pre-production aircraft were predicted to be built by March 1946. Work on the first airframe had not started when Japan surrendered, drawing the conflict to an abrupt close and effectively ending the immediate need for such an aircraft.

== Specifications (planned specification) ==
Data from Japanese Aircraft of the Pacific War; Famous Aircraft of the World, first series, no.76: Japanese Army Experimental Fighters (1)

General characteristics

- Crew: 1
- Length: 11.50 m (37 ft 9 in)
- Wingspan: 13.70 m (44 ft 11 in)
- Height: 4.05 m (13 ft 3 in)
- Wing area: 25.0 m^{2} (269 sq ft)
- Empty weight: 4,500 kg (9,921 lb) estimated
- Gross weight: 7,000 kg (15,432 lb) estimated
- Max takeoff weight: 8,500 kg (18,739 lb) estimated
- Powerplant: 2 × Nakajima Ne-230 turbojet engines, 8.68 kN (1,951 lbf) thrust each

Performance

- Maximum speed: 812 km/h (505 mph, 438 kn) estimated
- Range: 980 km (610 mi, 530 nmi) estimated
- Service ceiling: 12,000 m (39,000 ft)
- Rate of climb: 12.9 m/s (2,540 ft/min) estimated
- Wing loading: 280 kg/m^{2} (57 lb/sq ft)

Armament

- Guns: 2 × 30 mm (1.18 in) Ho-155 cannon and 2 × 20 mm (0.79 in) Ho-5 cannon
- Bombs: 1 × 500 kg (1,100 lb) or 800 kg (1,800 lb) bomb

== See also ==
Aircraft of comparable role, configuration, and era

- Messerschmitt Me 262

Related lists

- List of jet aircraft of World War II
