= Oerlikon FF =

Oerlikon FF 20 mm cannon
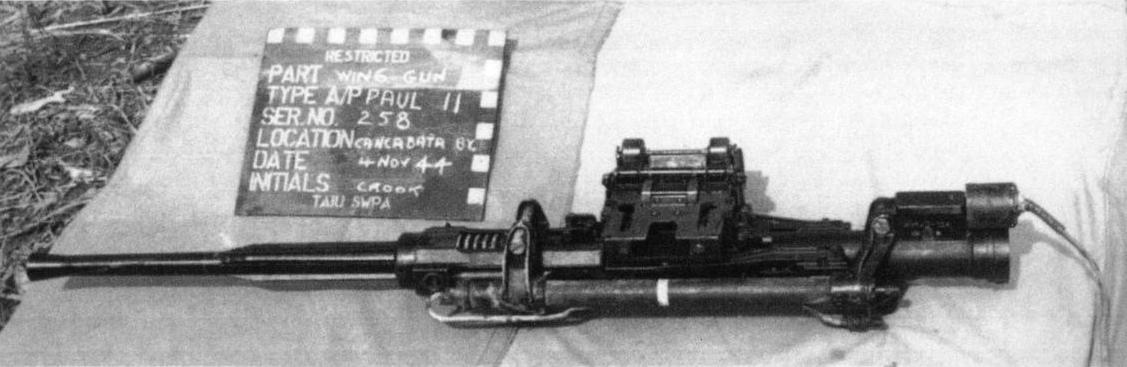
- Type 99 Mark 1 cannon (Japanese license-built Oerlikon FF)
- Type: Autocannon
- Place of origin: Switzerland

Service history
- In service: 1940–
- Used by: Various
- Wars: World War II

Production history
- Designer: Reinhold Becker
- Designed: 1935
- Manufacturer: Oerlikon
- Variants: Type 99 Mark 1 cannon MG FF cannon

Specifications
- Mass: 25 kg (55 lb)
- Barrel length: L/38: 760 mm (30 in)
- Shell: 20mm×72RB
- Caliber: 20 mm (0.787inch)
- Barrels: Single barrel (progressive RH parabolic twist, 9 grooves)
- Action: API blowback
- Rate of fire: 520 rounds per minute
- Muzzle velocity: 600 m/s (2,000 ft/s)
- Feed system: Cylindrical magazine holding 60 rounds, Later adjusted to be a belt fed gun

The FF were a series of 20mm autocannon introduced by Oerlikon in the late 1920s. The name comes from the German term Flügel Fest, meaning wing mounted, fixed, being one of the first 20mm guns to be small and light enough to fit into a fighter aircraft's wing. The FF series inspired many 20mm cannon used in World War II, including the Hispano-Suiza HS.404 (adopted by the French, British and U.S. forces), the German MG FF, and the Japanese IJNAS's Type 99 cannon.

== Design ==
The basic design was based on the original Oerlikon 20 mm cannon, in turn based on the German Empire's Becker 20 mm cannon of World War I. In the post-war period, Oerlikon had developed the original design to produce three autocannons with increasingly powerful rounds; the original model, later known as the "F", used the Becker 20x70mm round, the newer "L" model used a 20x100 round, and finally the "S" model used a 20x110. All of these weapons used the API blowback operational principle.

In 1935 Oerlikon started development of versions suitable for use as wing-mounted guns. In addition to various changes needed for remote firing and cartridge ejection, the new series focused primarily on rate-of-fire. The original "FF" used a slightly upgraded 128 gram 20x72mm round with a muzzle velocity of 600 metres per second (2,000 ft/s) at a cyclic rate of 520 rounds per minute, almost double that of the original F and AF models. The gun weighed only 24 kilograms (53 lb). Similar improvements led to the 30 kilograms (66 lb) FF L using a longer 20x101mm round which gave 750 metres per second (2,500 ft/s), and the 39 kilograms (86 lb) FF S firing a 20x110mm round at 830 metres per second (2,700 ft/s) at a slightly slower 470 rounds per minute. The original guns became known as the FF F from this point on.

The FF F was licensed by the Japanese and produced as the Type 99-1, along with the FF L as the Type 99–2. Hispano-Suiza built the FF S as the HS.7, and slightly improved HS.9. This design was later abandoned by Hispano-Suiza. In the 1930s, Marc Birkigt designed an entirely new gas-operated cannon with a locked bolt, the HS.404, which became one of the best 20 mm weapons of the war. Ikaria Werke in Germany started production of the FF F with a slightly more powerful 20x80mm round as the MG FF, but later introduced a new mine shell round which was lighter and improved velocity. The resulting MG FF/M was a common weapon until about 1944. Starting in late 1940 these were replaced by the very different Mauser MG 151/15 and Mauser MG 151/20 autocannon, respectively of 15mm (early) and 20mm calibre (primary production).

== See also ==
- List of autocannon
- List of API blowback firearms
