= Type 2 cannon =

- Type: Aircraft cannon
- Place of origin: Empire of Japan

Service history
- Used by: Imperial Japanese Navy
- Wars: World War II

Specifications
- Mass: 50.9 kg (112 lb 3 oz)
- Length: 2,089 mm (82.2 in)
- Barrel length: 1,350 mm (53 in)
- Cartridge: 30x92mmRB (264 g)
- Calibre: 30 mm (1.2 in)
- Action: API blowback
- Rate of fire: 380 rounds/min
- Muzzle velocity: 710 m/s (2,300 ft/s)
- Feed system: 42 Rounds Drum

The 30mm Type 2 cannon (Japanese: 二式三十粍固定機銃) was a Imperial Japanese Navy autocannon used during World War II. It was a scaled-up version of the 20mm Oerlikon FF cannon.

== Specifications ==
- Caliber: 30 mm (1.2 in)
- Ammunition: 30 x 92RB
- Weight: 51 kg (112 lb)
- Rate of fire: 380 rounds/min
- Muzzle velocity: 710 m/s (2,330 ft/s)

== See also ==
- List of autocannon
- List of API blowback firearms
