= Ho-155 cannon =

- Type: Aircraft cannon
- Place of origin: Imperial Japanese army

Service history
- Wars: World War II

Specifications
- Mass: Ho-155-I: 50 kg (110 lb 4 oz); Ho-155-II: 44 kg (97 lb 0 oz)
- Length: Ho-155-I: 1,750 mm (69 in); Ho-155-II: 1,510 mm (59 in)
- Barrel length: Ho-155-I: 1,140 mm (45 in); Ho-155-II: 980 mm (39 in)
- Cartridge: 30 x 114mm (235 g)
- Calibre: 30 mm (1.2 in)
- Action: Short recoil-operated
- Rate of fire: 450-500 rounds/min
- Muzzle velocity: 715 m/s (2,350 ft/s)
- Effective firing range: 900 m
- Feed system: Belt

The 30 mm Ho-155 cannon was a Japanese aircraft autocannon used during World War II, often mistakenly called with the Ho-105 or Ho-151. A lighter and more compact Ho-155-II was designed towards the end of the war.

== Development ==
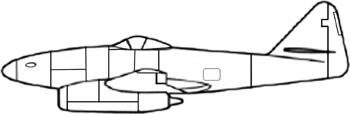
Had the war continued longer the Ho-155-II would most likely have seen service on the jet-powered Karyu Ki-201

The Ho-155-I was first began development in 1942 as a scaled-up and modified version of the 20mm Ho-5 cannon, itself a scaled-up Model 1921 aircraft .50-inch Browning machine gun. In 1943-44 began development of the Ho-155-I and in late 1944 began the development and production of the Ho-155-II for fit into tighter wing bays of fighter planes such as the Ki-84-Ic, Ki-102 and on the project design of the jet-powered Ki-201.

== Unknown service ==
Simultaneously the Ho-155-I and Ho-155-II were produced in Nagoya by the Nagoya Army Arsenal, but as the war was prolonged leading to shortages of materials it is not known how many were eventually produced or how many actually saw service. However it became an example of ingenuity and design from the simple basic design of the Browning machine gun.
