= Mitsubishi J2M Raiden =

Japanese land-based interceptor aircraft

J2M Raiden
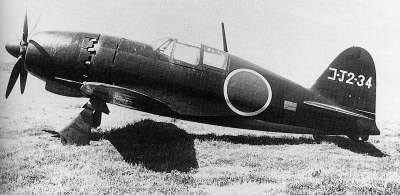
- Profile view of a Mitsubishi J2M Raiden

General information
- Type: Fighter aircraft
- Manufacturer: Mitsubishi Heavy Industries
- Primary user: Imperial Japanese Navy
- Number built: 621

History
- Introduction date: December 1942
- First flight: 20 March 1942
- Retired: August 1945

The Mitsubishi J2M Raiden (雷電, "Lightning Bolt") is a single-engined, land-based fighter aircraft used by the Imperial Japanese Navy Air Service in World War II. Its Allied reporting name was Jack.

== Design and development ==
The J2M was designed by Jiro Horikoshi, creator of the Mitsubishi A6M Zero, to meet the 14-Shi (14th year of the Showa reign, or 1939 in the Western calendar) official specification. It was to be a strictly local-defense interceptor, intended to counter the threat of high-altitude bomber raids, and thus relied on speed, climb performance, and armament at the expense of manoeuvrability. The J2M was a sleek, but stubby craft with its oversized Mitsubishi Kasei engine buried behind a long cowling, cooled by an intake fan and connected to the propeller with an extension shaft.

Teething development problems stemming from the engine cooling system, and the main undercarriage members led to a slowdown in production. A continual set of modifications resulted in new variants being introduced with the ultimate high-altitude variant, the J2M4 Model 34 flying for the first time in August 1944. It had a 1,420 hp Kasei 23c engine equipped with a turbocharger (mounted in the side of the fuselage just behind the engine) that allowed the rated power to be maintained up to 9,100 m (29,900 ft). Two upward-aimed, oblique-firing (aimed at seventy degrees) 20 mm cannons, mounted in the German Schräge Musik style, were fitted behind the cockpit with the four wing cannons retained. Unresolved difficulties with the turbocharger caused the project to be terminated after only two experimental J2M4s were built.

== Operational history ==
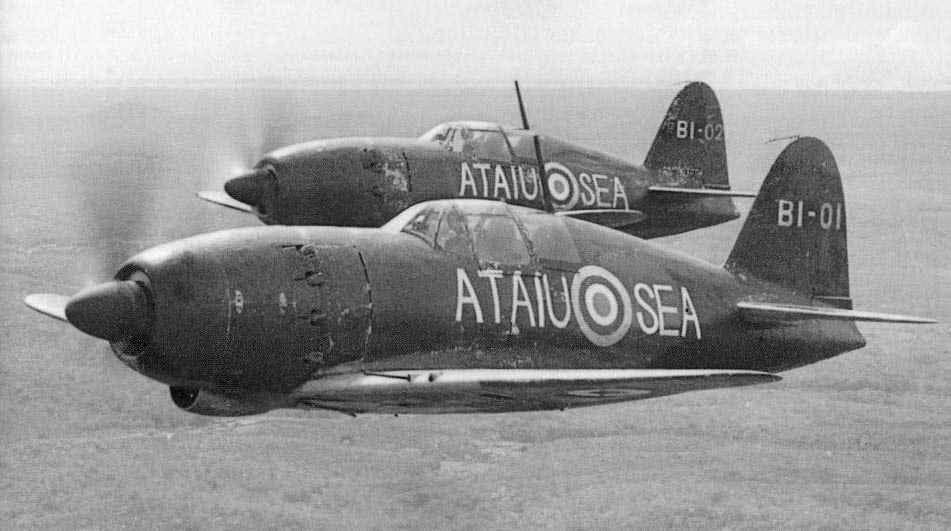
Two J2Ms of the 381 Kōkūtai in British Malaya being tested and evaluated by Japanese naval aviators under close supervision of RAF officers from Seletar Airfield in December 1945.

The first few produced J2M2s were delivered to the development units in December 1942 but severe problems were encountered with the engines. Trials and improvements took almost a year and the first batch of the serial built J2M2 Model 11 was delivered to 381st Kōkūtai in December 1943. Parallel with the J2M2, production of the J2M3 Raiden Model 21 started. The first J2M3s appeared in October 1943 but deliveries to combat units started at the beginning of February 1944.

The Raiden made its combat debut in June 1944 during the Battle of the Philippine Sea. Several J2Ms operated from Guam and Saipan, and a small number of aircraft were deployed to the Philippines. Later, some J2Ms were based in Japanese airfields in Korea under Genzan Ku: Genzan (Wonsan); Ranan (Nanam); Funei (Nuren); Rashin (Najin); and Konan, for defense of these areas and fighting against Soviet Naval Aviation units.

Primarily assigned to defend against the Boeing B-29 Superfortress heavy bomber, the type was handicapped at high altitude by the lack of a turbocharger. However, its four-cannon armament supplied effective firepower, and the use of dive and zoom tactics allowed it to score occasionally.

Insufficient numbers and the American switch to night bombing in March 1945 limited its effectiveness.

J2Ms took part in one of the final aerial combats of the Second World War when four Raidens, accompanied by eight Mitsubishi A6M Zeros, all belonging to the 302nd Kokutai, intercepted a formation of US Navy Grumman F6F Hellcats from the aircraft-carrier USS Yorktown during the morning of 15 August 1945 over the Kanto Plain. In the engagement, that took place only two hours before Japan officially announced its surrender, four Hellcats were lost along with two Raidens and two Zeros.

U.S. Technical Air Intelligence Command (TAIC) tested two captured J2Ms using 92 octane fuel plus methanol and calculated maximum speeds using measurements. The J2M2 ("Jack 11") achieved a speed of 407 mph (655 km/h) at 17,400 ft (5,300 m), and the J2M3 ("Jack 21") achieved a speed of 417 mph (671 km/h) at 16,600 ft (5,100 m).

== Variants ==
- J2M1 Prototype: fitted with the 1,044 kW (1,400 hp) Mitsubishi MK4C Kasei 13 14-cylinder air-cooled radial engine, and armed with two 7.7 mm (.303 in) Type 97 machine guns in the upper fuselage and two wing-mounted 20 mm Type 99 Model II cannon. - Eight built.
- J2M2 Model 11: Powered by 1,379 kW (1,850 hp) Mitsubishi MK4R-A Kasei 23a 14-cylinder radial engine, same armament as the J2M1.
- J2M3 Model 21: Armed with two wing-mounted 20 mm Type 99 Model II cannon and two wing-mounted 20 mm Type 99 Model I cannon.
- J2M3a Model 21A: Armed with four wing-mounted 20 mm Type 99 Model II cannon.
- J2M4 Model 32: Prototype fitted with the 1,357 kW (1,820 hp) Mitsubishi MK4R-C Kasei 23c engine. Many armament configurations have been reported, e.g., fuselage-mounted oblique-firing 20 mm Type 99 Model I cannon designed to fire upward as it passed underneath a bomber, two wing-mounted 20 mm Type 99 Model II cannon, and two wing-mounted 20 mm Type 99 Model I cannon. Problems with turbocharger; only two experimental versions were built.
- J2M5 Model 33: High altitude variant powered by 1,357 kW (1,820 hp) Mitsubishi MK4U-A Kasei 26a engine with mechanically driven supercharger, giving increased high-altitude speed at the expense of range. Two 20 mm Type 99 cannon in fuselage, two 20 mm Type 99 Model II cannon in wings.
- J2M5a Model 33A: Armed with four wing-mounted 20 mm Type 99 Model II cannon. Wing cannon were harmonized in trajectory and ballistics with each having 200 rounds per gun.
- J2M6 Model 31: Chronologically earlier than J2M4 and J2M5 this version was based on J2M3. Had wider cockpit and improved bubble canopy later used in J2M3 built since July 1943.
- J2M6a Model 31A: Chronologically earlier than J2M4 and J2M5 this version was based on J2M3a.
  Had wider cockpit and improved bubble canopy later used in J2M3a built since July 1943. One J2M6a was built.
- J2M7 Model 23A: J2M3 powered by Kasei 26a engine, a few built.
- J2M7a Model 23A: J2M3a powered by Kasei 26a engine, a few built.

=== Production ===
After the decisive Battle of Midway in 1942, Japan's military leaders rushed to re-equip their forces for defense of the home islands. In fighter designs, the interceptor role now took priority over forward projection of offensive power. Allied forces, meanwhile, sought to establish air superiority over Japanese-held territories via B-29 bombing raids on industrial targets.

The struggle to meet production demands sparked a Japanese initiative to recruit shonenko (child labour) from Taiwan (Formosa). Though the target of 25,000 youths was never reached, over 8,400 Taiwanese youths aged 12 to 14 relocated to Mitsubishi plants to help build the J2M Raiden.

The Allied advance took its toll. In 1945, aircraft production in Japan collapsed, as numbers for the J2M reflect.

J2M Production: Nagoya, Mitsubishi Jukogyo K.K.
Year	Jan.	Feb.	Mar.	Apr.	May	June	July	Aug.	Sept.	Oct.	Nov.	Dec.	Annual
1942			1	1	1	2	2	1	1	1	1	2	13
1943	0	0	1	2	0	0	3	4	5	16	21	22	90
1944	17	26	9	22	39	44	34	22	16	20	18	7	274
1945	17	12	29	16	0	8	7	27					116
Total													493

Allied bombing raids of Nagoya began in December 1944 and progressively disrupted production of the J2M. A direct hit on the Mitsubishi Dai San Kokuki Seisakusho aircraft plant caused the complete loss of airframes, machine tools, and jigs. This halted further production.

J2M Production: Kanagawa, Kōza K.K.
Year	Jan.	Feb.	Mar.	Apr.	May	June	July	Aug.	Sept.	Oct.	Nov.	Dec.	Annual
1944					1	0	0	1	2	3	4	6	17
1945	13	8	23	15	10	20	22	0					111
Total													128

Production generally suffered less from direct hits on factories, which were rare, but from attacks on suppliers and consequent shortages of material and construction tools.

== Operators ==
Japan

- Imperial Japanese Navy Air Service

== Surviving aircraft ==
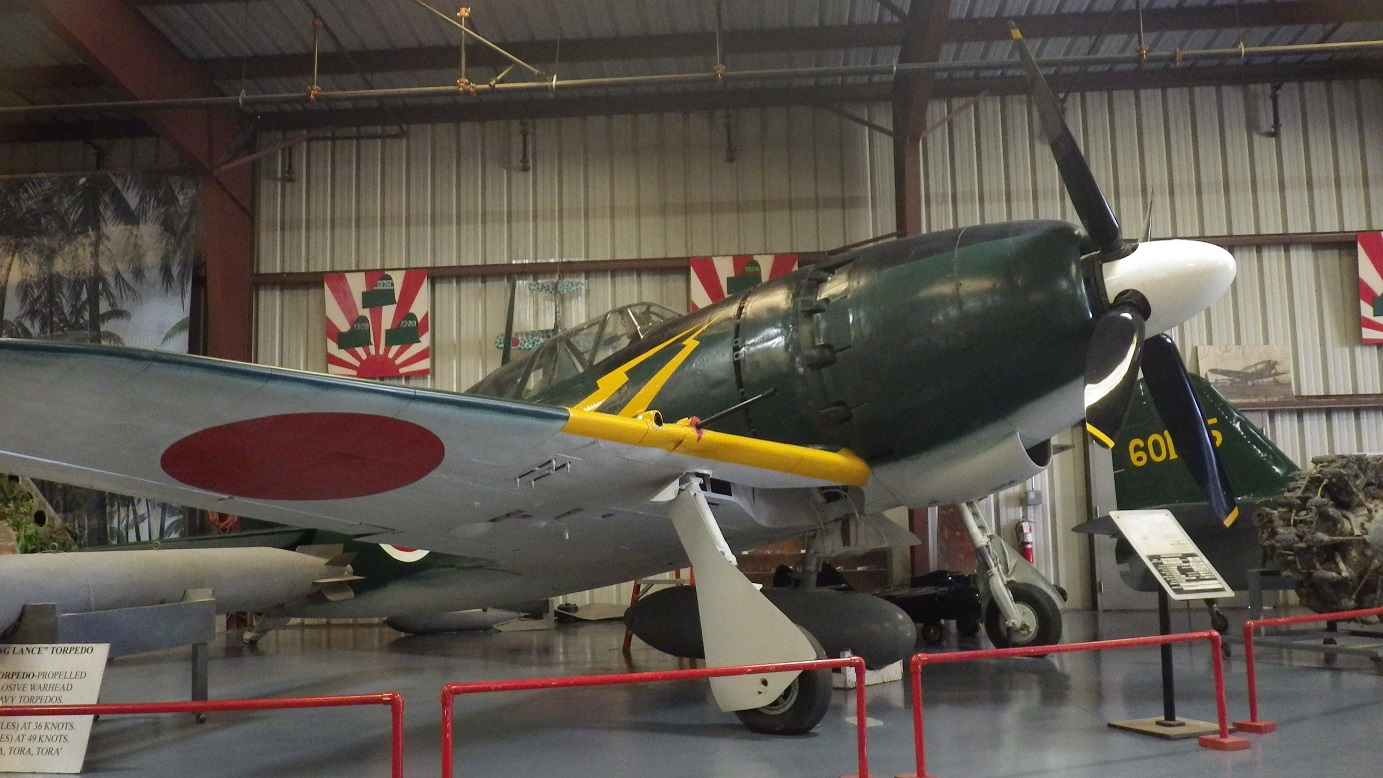
A J2M3 Model 21 in the Planes of Fame

J2M3 Model 21 c/n 3014 is on display at the Planes of Fame Air Museum in Chino, California. It was brought from Japan in 1945 for technical evaluation by the US Navy. Later declared surplus, it was displayed at the Travel Town Museum in Griffith Park, Los Angeles before it was acquired in 1958 by Planes of Fame founder Edward T. Maloney.

== Specifications (J2M3) ==
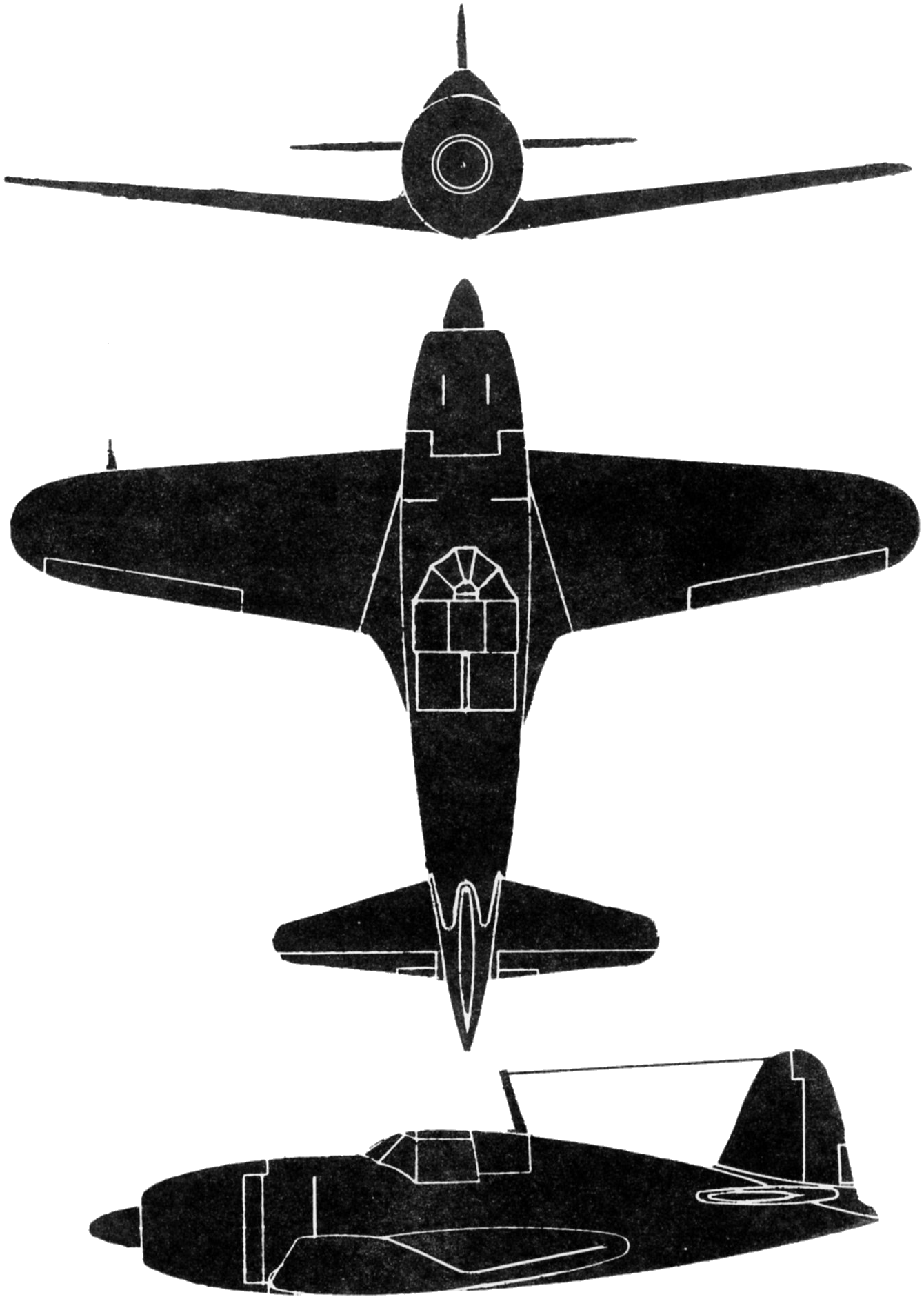
3-view silhouette of the Mitsubishi J2M

Data from Japanese Aircraft of the Pacific War, Mitsubishi J2M3-21 Raiden

General characteristics

- Crew: 1
- Length: 9.945 m (32 ft 8 in)
- Wingspan: 10.8 m (35 ft 5 in)
- Height: 3.81 m (12 ft 6 in)
- Wing area: 20.05 m^{2} (215.8 sq ft)
- Empty weight: 2,839 kg (6,259 lb)
- Gross weight: 3,211 kg (7,079 lb)
- Powerplant: 1 × Mitsubishi MK4R-A Kasei 23a 14-cylinder air-cooled radial piston engine, 1,300 kW (1,800 hp) for take-off

1,174 kW (1,575 hp) at 1,800 m (5,900 ft)
1,051 kW (1,410 hp) at 4,800 m (15,700 ft)

- Propellers: 4-bladed constant-speed metal propeller

Performance

- Maximum speed: 587 km/h (365 mph, 317 kn) at 5,300 m (17,400 ft)
- Cruise speed: 351 km/h (218 mph, 190 kn)
- Range: 1,898 km (1,179 mi, 1,025 nmi)
- Service ceiling: 11,700 m (38,400 ft)
- Time to altitude: 6,000 m (20,000 ft) in 6 minutes 14 seconds
- Wing loading: 171.3 kg/m^{2} (35.1 lb/sq ft)
- Power/mass: 0.391 kW/kg (0.238 hp/lb)

Armament

- 2 × 20 mm (0.787 in) Type 99 Mark 2 machine gun inboard wing-mounted with 190 rpg
- 2 × Type 99 Mark 1 machine gun outboard wing-mounted with 210 rpg
- 2 × 60 kg (132 lb) bombs

or

- 2 × 200 L (53 US gal; 44 imp gal) drop tanks or a larger central drop tank

== See also ==
Aircraft of comparable role, configuration, and era

- Blohm & Voss BV 155
- Curtiss XP-62
- Fiat G.55 Centauro
- Focke-Wulf Ta 152
- Hawker Tempest
- Lavochkin La-5FN
- Kawanishi N1K-J Shiden
- Macchi C.205 Veltro
- Mikoyan-Gurevich I-211
- Nakajima Ki-44 Shōki
- Nakajima Ki-84
- Republic XP-69
- Supermarine Spitfire Mk VI/IX
- Yakovlev Yak-9PD

Related lists

- List of aircraft of World War II
- List of aircraft of Japan, World War II
- List of fighter aircraft

== Bibliography ==
- The Complete Encyclopedia of World Aircraft New York: Barnes & Noble, 1977. ISBN 0-7607-0592-5.
- Francillon, René J. (1979). Japanese aircraft of the Pacific War. London: Putnam. ISBN 0-370-30251-6. OCLC 6124909. (new edition 1987 by Putnam Aeronautical Books, ISBN 0-85177-801-1.)
- Green, William. Air Enthusiast Magazine, Quarterly Volume 1, Number 2 Bromley, Kent: Pilot Press, 1971.
- Green, William. Warplanes of the Second World War, Volume Three: Fighters. London: Macdonald & Co. (Publishers) Ltd., 1973, First edition 1961. ISBN 0-356-01447-9.
- Huggins, Mark (January–February 2004). "Hunters over Tokyo: The JNAF's Air Defence of Japan 1944–1945". Air Enthusiast (109): 66–71. ISSN 0143-5450.
- Izawa, Yasuho & Holmes, Tony. J2M Raiden and N1K1/2 Shiden/Shiden-Kai Aces. Osprey Publishing. 2016 Aircraft of the Aces Number 129 . ISBN 9781472812612.
- Ledet, Michel & Osuo, Katshuhiko (January 2001). "Mitsubishi J2M Raiden: l'intercepteur de la Marine japonaise" [Mitsubishi J2M Raiden: The Japanese Navy's Interceptor]. Avions: Toute l'Aéronautique et son histoire (in French) (94): 8–16. ISSN 1243-8650.
- Ledet, Michel & Osuo, Katshuhiko (February 2001). "Mitsubishi J2M Raiden: l'intercepteur de la Marine japonaise". Avions: Toute l'Aéronautique et son histoire (in French) (95): 20–28. ISSN 1243-8650.
- United States Strategic Bombing Survey Aircraft Division. Mitsubishi Heavy Industries, Ltd. Corporation Report I, Washington, D.C. 1947.
- United States Strategic Bombing Survey Aircraft Division. Army Air Arsenal and Navy Air Depots Corporation Report XIX, Washington, D.C. 1947.
