= Type 99 cannon =

Type 99
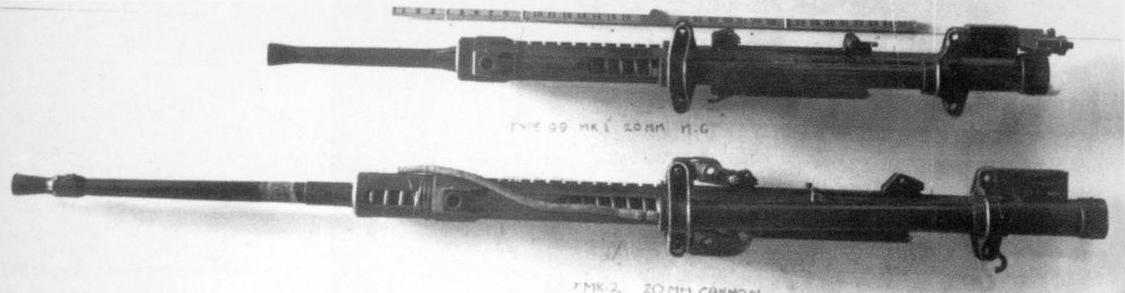
- Top:a Type 99 Mark 1 cannon; Below: a Type 99 Mark 2 cannon
- Type: Autocannon; Machine gun (official designation)
- Place of origin: Empire of Japan

Service history
- In service: Mark1 1939-45; Mark 2 1942-45
- Used by: Imperial Japanese Navy Air Service (IJNAS)
- Wars: World War II

Production history
- Designed: 1937

Specifications (Mark 1)
- Mass: 23 kg (51 lb)
- Length: 1,330 mm (52 in)
- Cartridge: 20×72RB
- Caliber: 20 mm (0.787 in)
- Action: API blowback
- Rate of fire: 520 rpm
- Muzzle velocity: 600 m/s (2,000 ft/s)
- Feed system: drum or belt-fed

The Type 99 Mark 1 machine gun and Type 99 Mark 2 machine gun were Japanese versions of the Oerlikon FF and Oerlikon FFL autocannons respectively. They were adopted by the Imperial Japanese Navy (IJN) in 1939 and served as their standard aircraft autocannon during World War II.

== Adoption ==
In 1935, officers in the Imperial Japanese Navy began to investigate 20 mm automatic cannon as armament for future fighter aircraft. Their attention was drawn to the family of aircraft autocannon manufactured by Oerlikon, the FF, FFL and FFS. These all shared the same operating principle, the advanced primer ignition blowback mechanism pioneered by the Becker cannon, but fired different ammunition: 20×72RB, 20×101RB, and 20×110RB, respectively.

Following the import and evaluation of sample guns, the Imperial Japanese Navy decided in 1937 to adopt these weapons. To produce the Oerlikon guns, a group of retired Navy admirals created a new arms manufacturing company, the Dai Nihon Heiki KK. In 1939 this started producing a Japanese version of the FF, initially known as the Type E (because the Japanese transliteration of Oerlikon was Erikon) but from late 1939 onwards formally known as the Type 99 Mark 1. A Japanese version of the FFL was produced as the Type 99 Mark 2. The FFS was tested, but not put in production.

The 99 in the designation derived from the Japanese imperial calendar year, 1939 corresponding to the Japanese year 2599. The formal designations were Type 99 Mark 1 machine gun and Type 99 Mark 2 machine gun (Japanese: Kyū-Kyū Shiki Ichigō Kizyū, Kanji: 九九式一号機銃) and Kyū-Kyū Shiki Nigō Kizyū, Kanji: 九九式二号機銃). The Japanese Navy classified 20 mm weapons as machine guns rather than cannon. These weapons were never used by the Japanese Army—there was almost no commonality in gun types or ammunition between Army and Navy.

The Type 99 Mark 1 and Mark 2 were not models of the same gun, instead they had parallel lines of development into several different models. Because of the close technical similarity, several modifications were adopted to both guns simultaneously.

Because it fired a bigger cartridge than the Type 99 Mark 1, the Type 99 Mark 2 had a higher muzzle velocity but a lower rate of fire, and was heavier. In the first years of the war the IJN preferred the Type 99 Mark 1, and it did not operationally use the Type 99 Mark 2 until 1942. Towards the end of the war it developed a preference for installing the Type 99 Mark 2, presumably to counter the improving performance and ruggedness of US combat aircraft. The Type 99 cannon suffered from relatively low muzzle velocity and rate of fire compared to other 20mm cannons but the trade off was an extremely light cannon that did not hinder flight performance of the IJN's fighter aircraft. The close economic and political ties between the IJN and Dai Nihon Heiki KK ensured that the latter had little competition.

== Type 99 Mark 1 ==
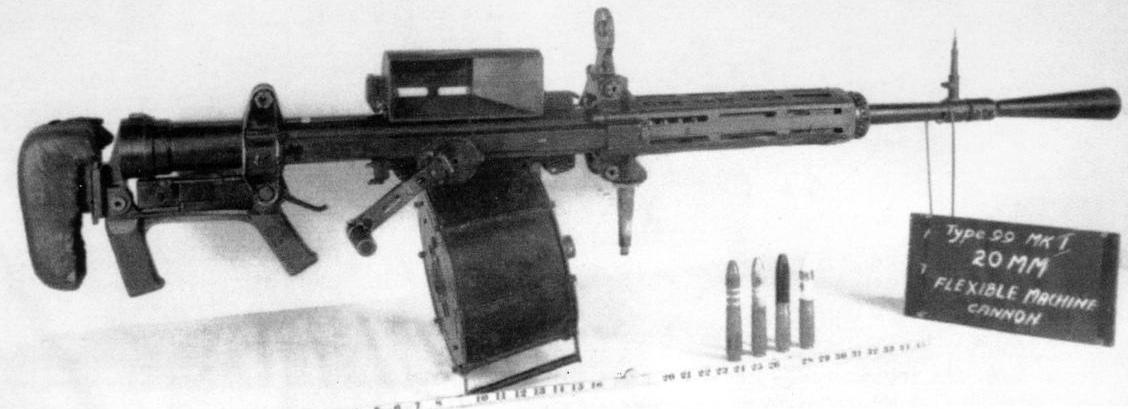
The flexible-mounted version of the Type 99 gun

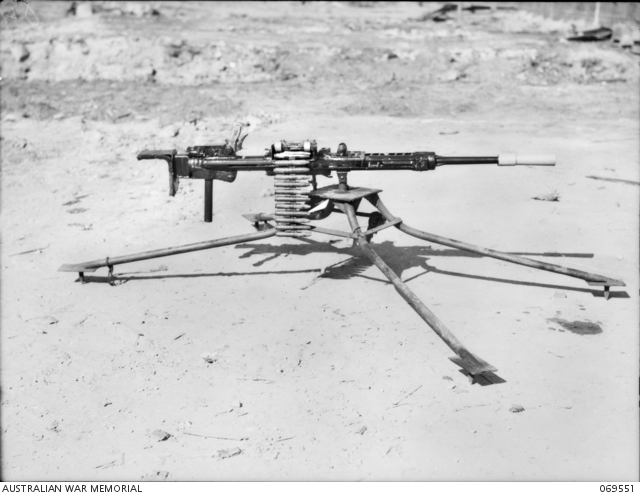
A belt-fed version of the Type 99, that been fitted to an improvised mounting for use by infantry

The Type 99 Mark 1 was adopted by the Japanese for both fixed and flexible installations. The fixed installation was developed first, as a fighter gun fed by a 60-round drum magazine, mounted in the wings of the famous Mitsubishi A6M Zeke or Zero. A flexible version, initially developed for the Mitsubishi G3M bomber, was inverted to put the ammunition drum below the line of sight of the gunner. Smaller drums (45, 30 or 15 rounds) were used on flexible installations where space was limited.

The limited ammunition capacity was an important disadvantage. The Type 99 Mark 1 Fixed Model 3 could be equipped with a 100-round drum, but the size of the drum was itself a problem in fighter installations, although the Model 3 guns were installed on the initial production versions of the A6M3. A more practical solution was provided by the Type 99 Mark 1 Fixed Model 4, which featured a Kawamura-developed belt feed mechanism.

=== Installations ===
- Kawanishi H6K
- Kawanishi H8K
- Kawanishi N1K Kyōfū
- Mitsubishi A6M
- Mitsubishi G3M
- Mitsubishi G4M
- Mitsubishi J2M Raiden
- Nakajima J1N Gekkō

== Type 99 Mark 2 ==
The Type 99 Mark 2 was a heavier weapon with a stronger recoil, and was not put in use by the IJN before 1942. It was used exclusively in fixed installations, i.e., either in fighters or in power-operated turrets. The Type 99 Mark 2 was carried by later models of the A6M, starting with the A6M3a Reisen Model 22 Ko, and on later Navy fighters such as the Kawanishi N1K-J.

The Model 4 of this weapon adopted the same belt-feed mechanism as the Type 99 Mark 1 Model 4. The Type 99 Mark 2 Model 5 resulted from attempts to increase the rate of fire. By modifications that included the addition of strong buffer springs, the rate of fire was raised to between 670 and 750 rpm. But the Model 5 was formally adopted only in May 1945 and may not have seen combat.

=== Specifications ===
- Caliber: 20 mm
- Ammunition: 20×101RB
- Length: 189 cm (74 in)
- Weight: 34 kg (75 lb)
- Rate of fire: 480 rounds/min
- Muzzle velocity: 750 m/s (2460 ft/s)

=== Installations ===
- Aichi B7A Ryūsei
- Aichi E16A Zuiun
- N1K-J Shiden
- Mitsubishi A6M
- Mitsubishi A7M Reppū
- Mitsubishi G4M
- Mitsubishi J2M Raiden
- Nakajima J1N Gekkō

== Variants ==
Type	99-1 mod 1	99-1 mod 4	99-2 mod 1	99-2 mod 4	99-2 mod 4 kai	99-2 mod 5	14mm 14-Shi (experiment)
Caliber	20 mm						14.5 mm
Action	API blowback						
Weight	23 kg	27.2 kg	37 kg	38 kg		38.5 kg	28.5 kg
Length	1331 mm		1885 mm				1645 mm
Barrel length	810 mm		1250 mm				975mm
Rate of fire	520 rpm	550 rpm	480 rpm	500 rpm	620 rpm	720 rpm	630 rpm
Muzzle velocity	600 m/s		720–750 m/s				970 m/s
Cartridge type	20x72RB		20x101RB				14.5x100RB
Shell weight	127-132g						44.7g
Cartridge weight	200-203g		221-224g				140g
Feed system	drum 30,45,60 rounds Model 3 -100 rounds	belt 125-250 rounds	drum 60,100 rounds	belt-fed 125-250 rounds			drum 100 rounds
