= Profense PF 50 =

PF 50 chain gun
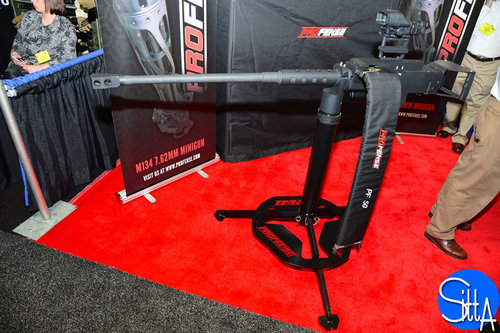
- PF 50 in AUSA 2015
- Type: Chain gun
- Place of origin: USA

Production history
- Manufacturer: Profense, LLC
- Produced: 2015–present

Specifications
- Mass: 34.47 kg (76.0 lb)
- Length: 1,524 millimetres (60.00 in)
- Barrel length: 802 millimetres (31.57 in)
- Width: 254 millimetres (10.00 in)
- Height: 225 millimetres (8.86 in)
- Cartridge: 12.7x99mm NATO
- Caliber: 12.7 mm (0.5 in)
- Barrels: 1
- Action: External electric power
- Rate of fire: Variable, 450/550 rpm with burst limiter, 650 rpm max
- Feed system: 12.7 mm NATO M9 linked ammunition belt
- Sights: Mount for optical sights provided

The Profense PF 50 is a 12.7 mm electrically driven (non gas-operated) chain gun produced by Profense LLC, with a maximum rate of fire of 650 rpm. This weapon is very similar to the M2HB machine gun, however it differs in operation system. It works with an electric motor as on the Bushmaster gun produced by ATK. The Profense PF 50 features a digital, programmable, variable rate Gun Control Unit (GCU). It can also be configured to single shot sniper mode, with optical sight mount. It can be installed on helicopter, naval vessels, wheeled vehicles, unmanned vehicles, aircraft, and remotely operated weapon stations.

== See also ==
- L94A1 chain gun, British 7.62 mm chain gun
- M242 Bushmaster, US 25 mm chain gun
