= XM913 chain gun =

Experimental American chain gun

XM913
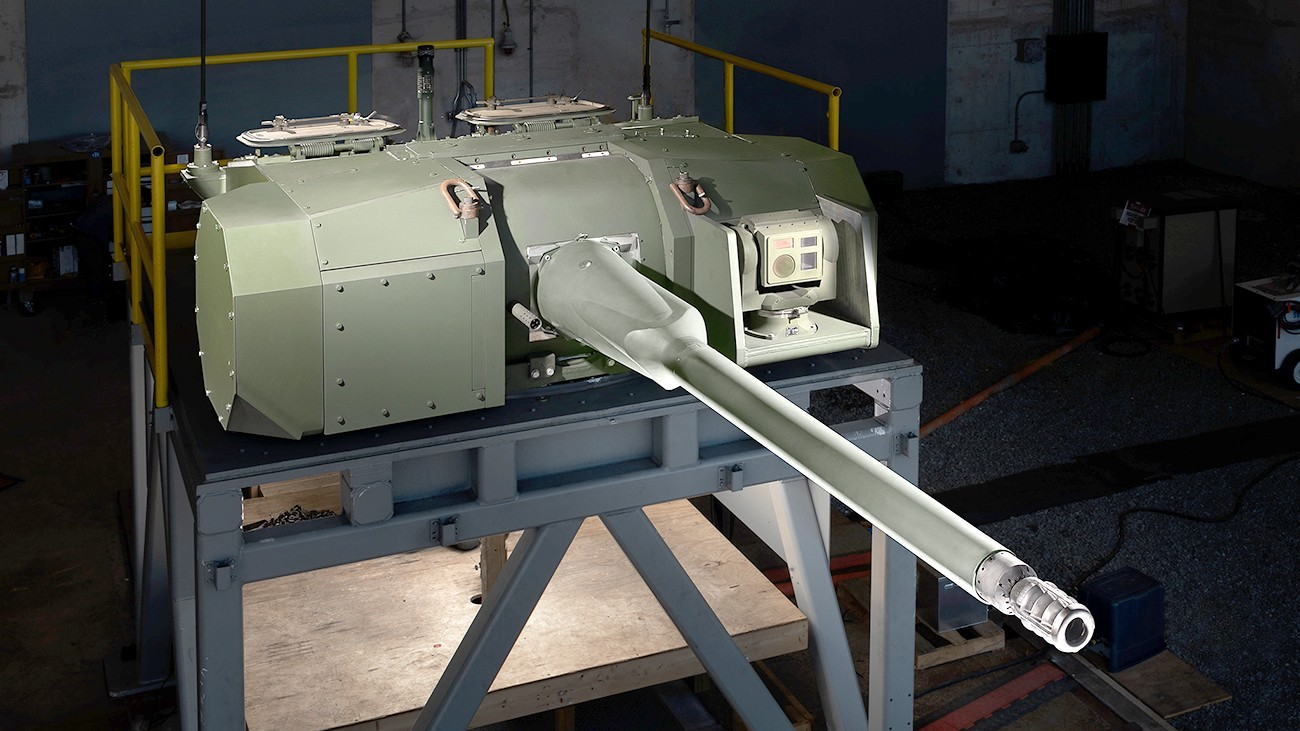
- US 50mm chain gun autocannon
- Type: Chain gun autocannon
- Place of origin: United States

Production history
- Designer: Picatinny Arsenal
- Manufacturer: Northrop Grumman

Specifications
- Mass: 660 lb (300 kg)
- Length: 157.8 inches (4,010 mm)
- Barrel length: 117.7 inches (2,990 mm)
- Shell: 50×228mm
- Caliber: 50 millimetres (1.97 in) caliber
- Rate of fire: 100/200 rounds per minute

The XM913 is an experimental American chain gun produced at Picatinny Arsenal. The cannon is a larger and more modern version of the 35 mm Bushmaster III chain gun, which itself is a larger version of the 25 mm M242 Bushmaster cannon. Although its shells, 50 x 228 mm, are twice the diameter of the 25×137mm cartridge of the M242, the 50mm cannon is not much longer than the smaller weapon. The overall lengths of the 25mm cannon and 50mm cannon are 105.2 inches (267 cm) and 117.7 inches (299 cm), respectively; while the portion of the gun that intrudes into the turret are 30.0 inches (76 cm) and 40.1 inches (102 cm), respectively.

The XM913 has been selected as the primary weapon on the US Army's new Next Generation Combat Vehicle, the XM30 MICV.

== Ammunition ==
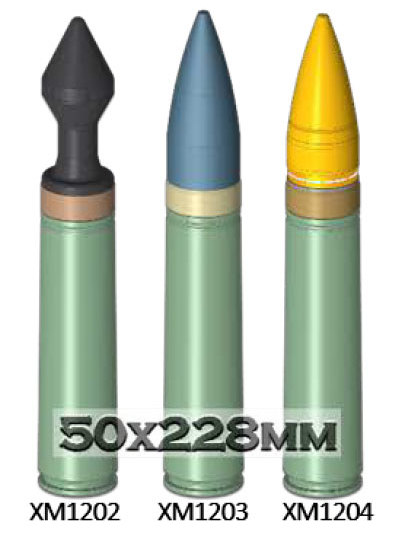
50 x 228 munitions.

The XM1204 High Explosive Air Bursting with Tracer round is programmable. The gunner can select from three detonation modes.

- When in point detonate mode the projectile's high explosive detonates when it hits a target.
- In point detonate delay mode the high explosive detonates a brief instant after it hits a target. The delay is intended to let the projectile first penetrate a wall, and explode when it emerges on the other side.
- In air burst mode the cannon's aiming system programs the munition to explode in the air above the target. When the gunner aims their sight on the desired target, and presses their trigger halfway, the aiming system calculates the range to the target. They can then raise their sight slightly above the target, and when they pull the trigger all the way the aiming system will instruct the round to explode in the air above the target. Enemies hiding behind an obstacle can then be killed or wounded without blowing a hole through the obstacle.

The XM1203 Armor Piercing Fin Stabilized Discarding Sabot with Tracer. The projectile itself is 50 mm in diameter, encasing a long thin dart, designed to pierce armored vehicles. A light "sabot" grips the barrel's rifling, in order for the shell to get the full power of the expanding gas. Tracer rounds have a button of pyrotechnic chemical that leaves a trail to help a gunner observe the trajectory/path of the shot.

The XM1202 Target Practice-Tracer round is a full-bore training round 50 mm in diameter. With the intended purpose of drill firing and gun ballistic tests, the XM1202 round likely shares similar ballistic performance to the XM1204 HEAB-T round. Tracer rounds have a button of pyrotechnic chemical that leaves a trail to help a gunner observe the trajectory/path of the shot.

== See also ==
- Bushmaster III
