= M230 chain gun =

American autocannon

M230 Cannon
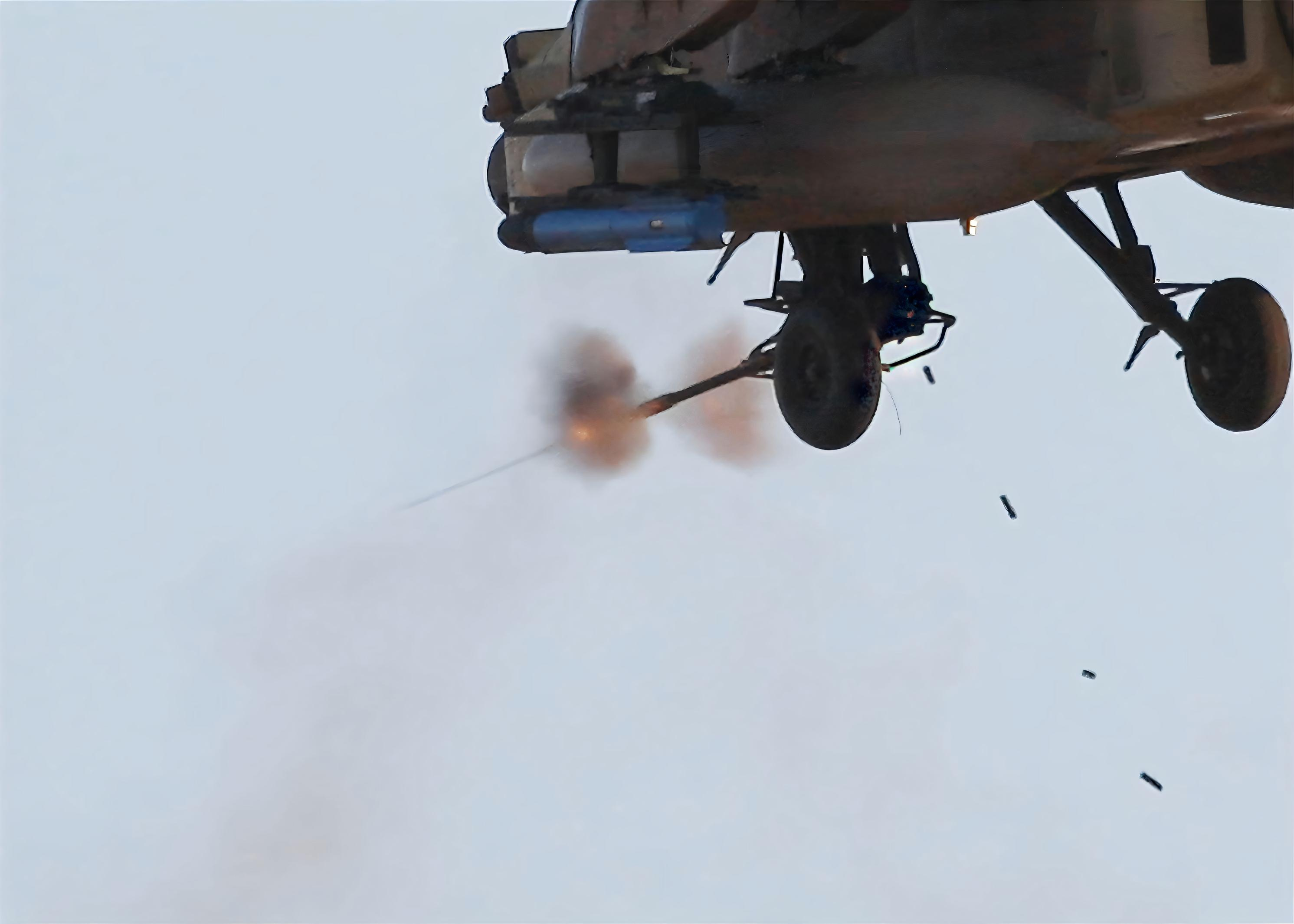
- M230 chain gun firing from an AH-64D-I Apache Longbow
- Type: Chain gun
- Place of origin: United States

Service history
- In service: 1983–present
- Used by: United States, and other countries
- Wars: Persian Gulf War; War in Afghanistan; Iraq War

Production history
- Designer: Hughes Helicopters
- Designed: 1973
- Manufacturer: Hughes Helicopters (1975–1985); McDonnell Douglas Helicopters (1985–2002); Alliant Techsystems (2002–2015) Orbital ATK (2015–2018); Northrop Grumman Innovation Systems (from 2018)
- Produced: Since 1975
- Variants: M230LF

Specifications
- Mass: 59.5 kg (130 lb)
- Length: 2,181 mm (85.9 in)
- Width: 277.2 mm (10.9 in)
- Height: 288.8 mm (11.4 in)
- Shell: 30×113 mmB: M788 Target Practice (TP); M789 High Explosive Dual Purpose (HEDP); M799 High Explosive Incendiary (HEI)
- Caliber: 30 millimetres (1.18 in) caliber
- Action: Open bolt
- Rate of fire: 625±25 rpm
- Muzzle velocity: 805 m/s (2,641 ft/s)
- Effective firing range: 300 m (328 yd)
- Maximum firing range: 4,000 m (4,370 yd)

The M230 Cannon is a 30 mm (30×113 mm), single-barrel electrically-driven autocannon, using external electrical power (as opposed to recoil or expanding gas generated by the firing cartridge) to cycle the weapon between shots. It was designed and manufactured originally by Hughes Helicopters in Culver City, California. As of 2019, it is produced by Northrop Grumman Innovation Systems.

== Development ==
In 1972, Hughes Helicopters began a company-funded research effort to design a machine gun to fire the U.S. Army's M50 20 mm round. By April 1973, the program had fired test rounds of more powerful 30 mm WECOM linked ammunition, from a prototype (A model). In January 1975, a model C was added, a linkless version for the proposed Advanced Attack Helicopter YAH-64; the helicopter was eventually adopted as the AH-64 Apache, with the model C as standard armament. The linked ammunition version was intended for use on the AH-1S Cobra as the M230E1, but was later dropped.

== Design ==
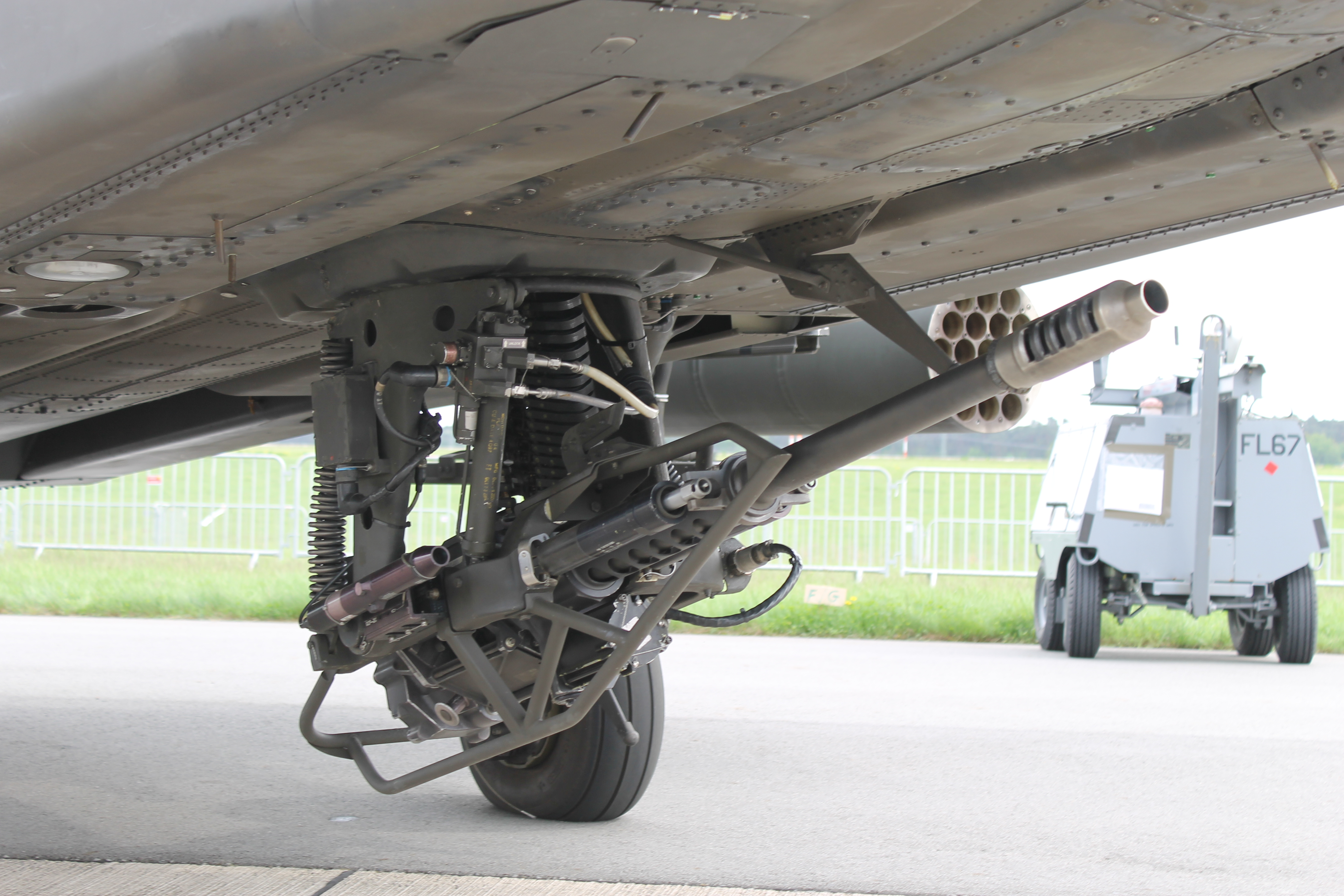
M230 chain gun on a US Army AH-64 Apache at the Berlin Air Show (2018).

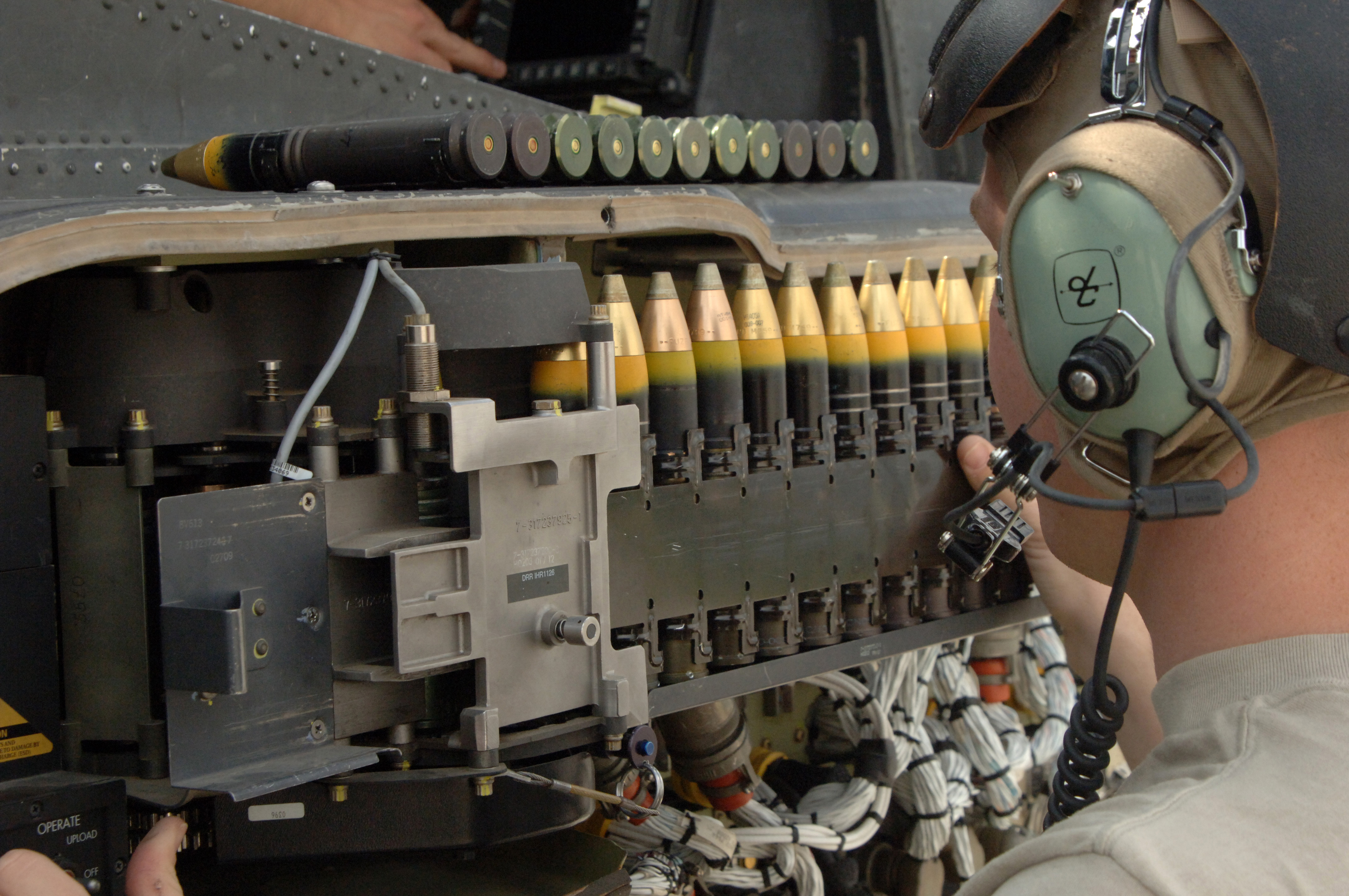
M789 HEDP 30 mm rounds being loaded into an AH-64D Longbow Apache in April 2007.

=== Apache and DAP mounts ===
The M230 Chain Gun is used on the MH-60L Direct Action Penetrator. It is also the Area Weapon System on the Boeing AH-64 Apache attack helicopter, mounted on the chin turret. It uses a 2 hp (1.5 kW) electric motor to fire 30 mm (1.2 in) linkless ammunition at a rate of 625±25 rounds per minute. The air-cooled gun's practical rate of fire is about 300 rounds per minute with a 10-minute cooling period. The gun has a positive cook-off safety for open bolt clearing, and double ram prevention. Spent casings are ejected overboard through the bottom of the gun.

The mount on the AH-64 uses secondary hydraulics to move the gun. The elevation is provided via a single hydraulic actuator on the gun's centerline just forward of the pivot point. The gun is spring-loaded to return to its centerline stowed position with the barrel angled up about 11 degrees if hydraulic power is lost. This allows the gun, which is mounted below the copilot station, to collapse into a space between the pilots' stations in a hard landing.

The Apache can carry up to 1,200 rounds for the gun in an internal magazine known as the 12-PAK, designed and manufactured by Meggitt Defense Systems, Inc. A special internal fuel tank, the Robertson IAFS (known as the "Robby Tank" to the crews) incorporates a combined fuel tank and magazine for enhanced flight range, but restricts ammunition capacity to 300 rounds. Ammunition is loaded into the Apache by armament personnel using specialized ground support equipment: an aircraft-mounted motorized loader and special ammunition handling tray.

The M230 can fire the 30×113 mm rounds used in the ADEN cannon and DEFA cannon, although U.S. Apaches use Lightweight 30 mm rounds made with a lighter alloy than brass (ADEN) or steel (DEFA) cases. The M230 rounds cannot be fired by weapons designed for the ADEN or DEFA rounds. The Lightweight 30 mm rounds come in three varieties: the M788 rounds, which have a blue band near the nose, the M789 with a yellow stripe atop a black band, and the M799 with a red stripe atop a yellow band. The M799 HEI round is not used by the U.S. Army because of the danger of a round exploding in the gun barrel.

The M789 is the U.S. Apache's main tactical round, a High Explosive Dual Purpose (HEDP) ammunition cartridge. Each round contains 21.5 g (0.76 oz) of explosive charge sealed in a shaped-charge liner. The liner collapses into an armor-piercing jet of metal that can penetrate more than 50 mm (2.0 in) of rolled homogeneous armour at 2500 m (2,734 yds). The shell is also designed to fragment upon impact, and produces antipersonnel effects out to 13 ft (4 m) from the point of impact.

== Variants ==
=== M230LF and MAWS ===
The M230LF, offered by Orbital ATK, is a more capable version of the Apache autocannon. Features include an anti-hangfire system, a delinking feeder that exploits linked ammunition, and an extended-length barrel, which results in greater muzzle velocity and hitting power from the same M789 HEDP and NATO standard 30 mm ADEN/DEFA projectiles. The rate of fire is reduced to 200 rounds/minute and overall length decreased to 84.0 inches (213 cm). The chain gun can be installed in an enclosed turret on patrol boats and ground vehicles.

The MAWS (Modular Advanced Weapon System) lightweight gun system, developed in partnership with the U.S. Navy, utilizes a remotely operated M230LF in an open mount. It is controlled by a Remote Operator's Console (ROC)—with either dual grips or a joystick—from a touch panel display and extended day color TV.

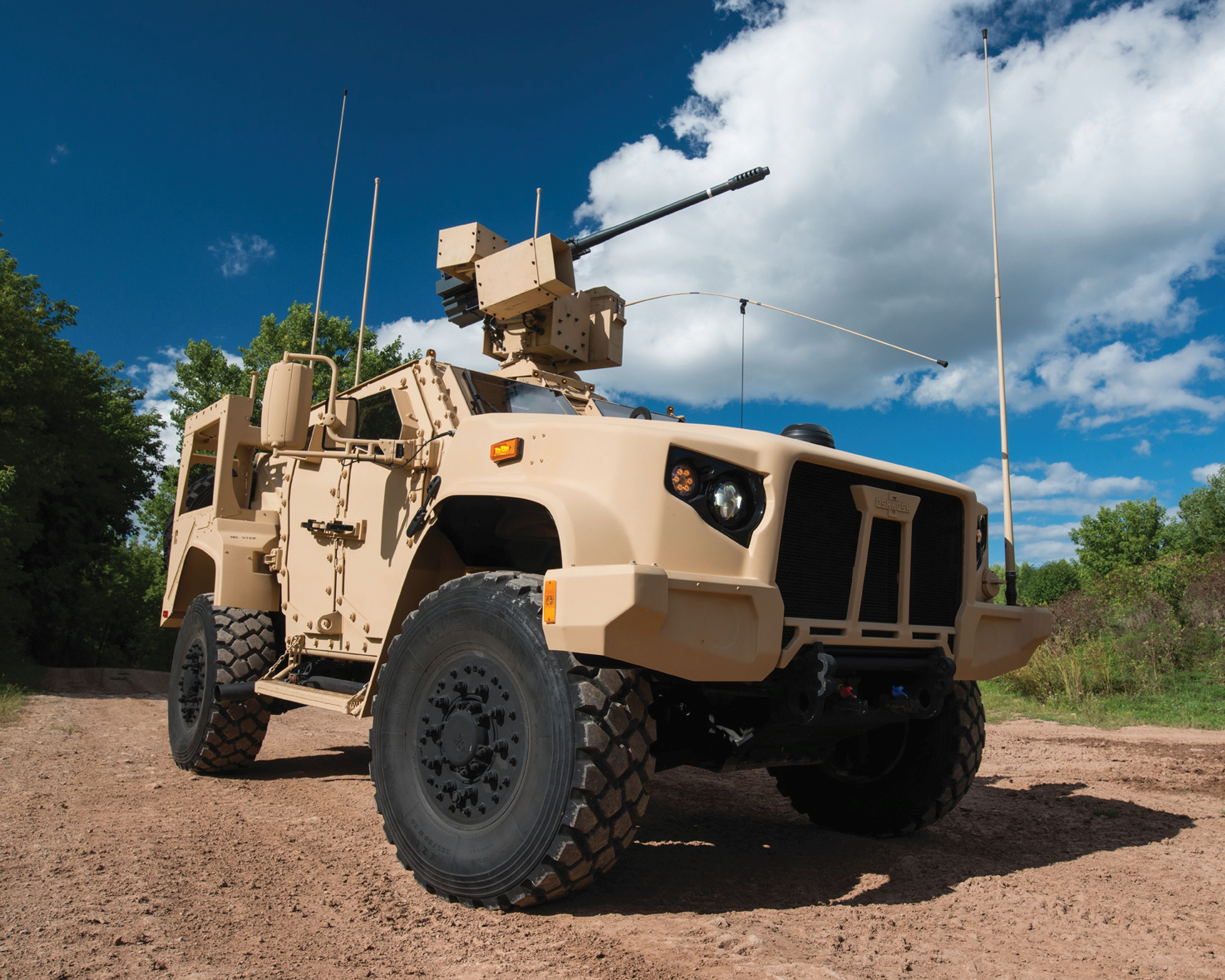
Oshkosh L-ATV in M1278 Heavy Guns Carrier JLTV configuration and fitted with an EOS R-400S-MK2 remote weapon system integrated with Orbital ATK's M230LF 30 mm lightweight automatic chain gun

In February 2015, Oshkosh Defense and ATK conducted a firing demonstration of the M230LF on an Oshkosh M-ATV MRAP to demonstrate the viability and effectiveness of a medium caliber weapon system for light tactical vehicles. The live fire demonstration showcased improved accuracy in mobile engagements and improved lethality on the M-ATV using the gun, mounted on the Electro Optic Systems (EOS) R400S-Mk2, a 3-axis stabilized remote weapon station (RWS) weighing less than 400 kg (880 lb). The addition of the 72.6 kg (160 lb) M230LF stabilized on the RWS provides mobile precise lethality, usually reserved for heavier combat vehicles, with increased off-road mobility and MRAP levels of protection, along with optional Stinger missiles. Oshkosh has also fitted the M230LF to the L-ATV to fulfil the U.S. Army's light reconnaissance vehicle (LRV) role.

Australian company Electro Optic Systems also utilises the M230LF for its "Slinger" defensive system. The system is planned for usage against drones by using a radar and a variety of sensors to track and destroy targets with a single shot. All together it weighs less than 400 kg (880 lb) and can be mounted on a flatbed truck, allowing for a more cost effective way of destroying drones compared to missile based systems. On October 2, 2023 it was confirmed that EOS would send an undisclosed number of Slingers to Ukraine to combat the growing drone threat.

In October 2024, unveiled the M230LF dual-feed chain gun. The cannon has a dual-feed mechanism to allow operators to select between XM1211 proximity fuzed rounds to neutralize UAS and XM1198 HEDP rounds for anti-armor engagements. This enables a single gun to target both threats and eliminates the need for mixed ammunition belts in a single feed.

=== In SHORAD-use ===
==== Stryker A1 M-SHORAD ====
On 28 February 2018, the US Army announced that Stryker vehicles would be modified with sensors and weapons to fulfill an interim Maneuver-Short-Range Air Defense (M-SHORAD) requirement. This is in response to a capability gap identified in Europe against Russian unmanned aerial vehicles (UAVs). In June 2018, the Army chose Leonardo DRS to supply the mission equipment package, which partnered with Moog Inc. to integrate the Reconfigurable Integrated-weapons Platform (RIwP) onto the vehicle. The system can be fitted with a Stinger pod and Longbow Hellfire missile rails and comes equipped with a 30 mm M230LF chain gun and the 7.62 mm coaxial machine gun, as well as non-kinetic defeat capabilities and a Rada onboard multimission hemispheric radar. The Army chose DRS because of the flexibility of the reconfigurable turret to allow for growth opportunities and alternate weapon options, it posed less intrusion to the existing vehicle platform, as they have a desire to keep the Stryker as common across the fleet as possible, and it provided increased protection as the crew can reload ammunition under armor. All 144 M-SHORAD systems are planned to be delivered by 2022. The turret can mount one four-shot Stinger pod or two Hellfire missiles on either side, and reloading of the M230LF and Stingers can be done through roof hatches giving partial protection. The system can act in a secondary anti-vehicle role, as the 30 mm cannon is larger than the 25 mm gun mounted on the M2 Bradley and the Hellfire has greater range than TOW missiles typically used by ground vehicles.

==== MADIS ====
In September 2020, the US Marines contracted Kongsberg to qualify the XM914 RWS on the Joint Light Tactical Vehicle (JLTV), equipped with an XM914E1 30 mm cannon, 7.62 mm coaxial machinegun, and Stinger missiles to fulfill an air defense role. The Marine Air Defense Integrated System (MADIS) fills the gap left by the retirement of the AN/TWQ-1 Avenger by the USMC in the mid-2000s. It consists of two JLTVs, one with the turret fitted with a 30 mm cannon, 4-round Stinger pod, and an optical sensor and the other with an RPS-42 360-degree radar, 7.62 mm M134 minigun, and EO/IR sensors; both have the Modi II dismounted electronic countermeasures system and shoulder-fired Stingers. The indefinite delivery / indefinite quantity (IDIQ) contract was signed in October 2021.

==== Agnostic Gun Truck ====
On 4 April 2023, the United States included "counter-Unmanned Aerial System 30 mm gun trucks" as part of Ukraine Security Assistance Initiative funds during the Russian invasion of Ukraine. The Northrop Grumman Agnostic Gun Truck consists of an M230LF mounted on a civilian pickup truck. Three battery sets each including three gun trucks and one Mobile, Acquisition, Cueing and Effector System (M-ACE) will be delivered; M-ACE incorporates a mast-mounted 3D radar that can detect a drone out to 10 km (6.2 mi) as well as tracking and identification cameras. The radar cues the guns onto a target, which fires M1211 High Explosive Proximity Self Destruct rounds capable of engaging UAS up to Class 2. The AGT was meant to be delivered within 30 to 90 days of the contract award, however by early August delays in the procurement process had prevented the full complement of trucks from being built. They were to be sent "very shortly" by October 2023.

== Aircraft use ==
- Boeing AH-64 Apache
- AgustaWestland Apache
- Sikorsky MH-60L/M Direct Action Penetrator (DAP)
- CASA/IPTN CN-235

== See also ==
- M242 Bushmaster 25mm chain gun
- Bushmaster II 30mm chain gun
- Bushmaster III 35/50mm chain gun
- Bushmaster IV 40mm chain gun
- Shipunov 2A42 30mm automatic cannon
- 2A72 30mm automatic cannon
