= Northrop Grumman M-ACE =

Counter unmanned air system

The M-ACE is a counter unmanned air system (C-UAS) made by the American company Northrop Grumman.

== Name ==
M-ACE stands for Mobile, Acquisition, Cueing and Effector System.

== Features ==
The core of the system is a light truck mounted surveillance mast which hosts a 3D radar, radio frequency sensors, and cameras.

Northrop Grumman's M230 chain gun in a remote weapons station has been integrated into M-ACE.

== History ==
Testing of the system began in 2020. Following testing the program moved into a design verification and upgrade stage. Northrop Grumman promoted the project as mature in 2021.

== Operators ==
The system, including integrated M230s, is in operation with the Ukrainian military. Units were first sent to Ukraine in 2023.

== Potential operators ==
The Republic of China (Taiwan) Military Police have expressed an interest in acquiring three systems, primarily for protecting the area around the Presidential Office Building, Taipei.
