= Mk44 Bushmaster II =

30 mm chain gun

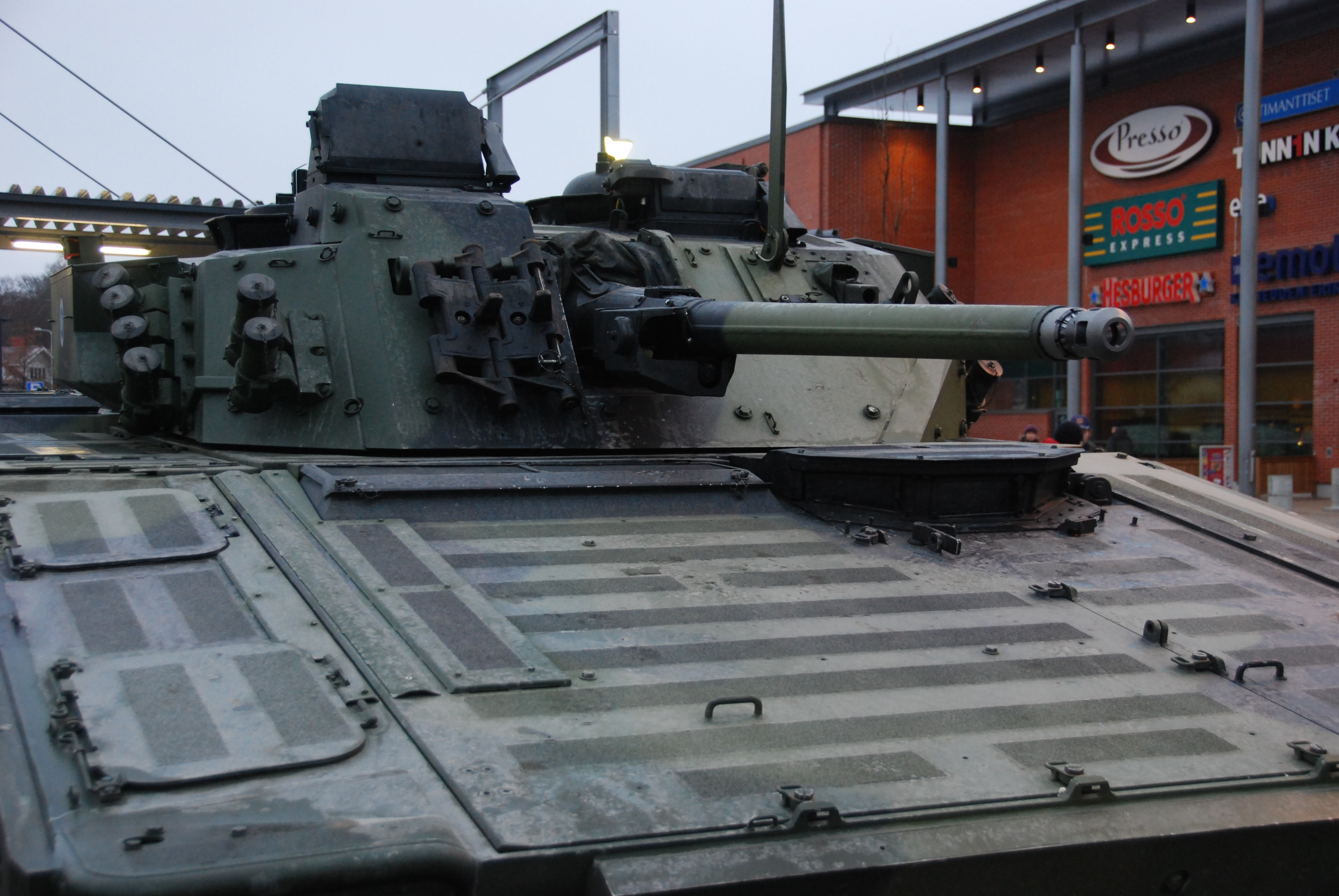
- Finnish CV 9030 with Mk44
- Type: Chain gun autocannon
- Place of origin: United States

Service history
- In service: 1994– Norway: 1996– USA: 2007–
- Used by: See users

Production history
- Designer: Alliant Techsystems
- Manufacturer: Northrop Grumman

Specifications
- Mass: 344 lb (160 kg)
- Length: 134.05 inches (3,405 mm)
- Barrel length: 94.88 inches (2,410 mm)
- Width: 13.5 inches (340 mm)
- Height: 15.43 inches (392 mm)
- Shell: 30×173mm 40×180mm
- Caliber: 30 millimetres (1.18 in) caliber 40 millimetres (1.57 in) caliber
- Rate of fire: 100/200 rounds per minute
- Muzzle velocity: 1,080 metres per second (3,500 ft/s) (HEI-T ammunition)
- Effective firing range: 3,000 metres (9,800 ft) land appl. 5,100 metres (16,700 ft) naval appl.

The Mk44 Bushmaster II is a 30 mm chain gun manufactured by Northrop Grumman. It is a derivative of the 25 mm M242 Bushmaster, and uses 70% of the same parts as the M242 while increasing the firepower by as much as 50% with the 20% increase in caliber size. The barrel is chromium-plated for extended life. The gun uses standard GAU-8 Avenger ammunition that is available in API (Armor-Piercing Incendiary), HEI (High-Explosive Incendiary) and APFSDS-T (Armor-Piercing Fin-Stabilized Discarding Sabot-Tracer) variants.

The gun can be converted to a caliber of 40×180 mm, which involves changing the barrel and a few key parts, to use the SuperShot 40 cartridge. It can also be converted to use the 30×170 mm RARDEN cartridge.

== History ==
The Bushmaster II is the standard primary armament of the Bionix-II AFV currently in service with the Singapore Army, the KTO Rosomak in Polish service, and the CV90 AFVs in Finnish, Norwegian and Swiss service. Although the United States Air Force selected this cannon to replace the 25 mm GAU-12 Equalizer and Bofors 40 mm Automatic Gun L/60 guns on its fleet of AC-130U gunships in 2007, this plan was later canceled. The United States Marine Corps' cancelled Expeditionary Fighting Vehicle, was expected to be armed with this cannon as well. Some United States Navy vessels, such as the new San Antonio-class amphibious transport dock are armed with the Bushmaster II for surface threat defense.

The Bushmaster II cannon is used in the DS30M Mark 2 Automated Small Calibre Gun (ASCG) point defense system that is fitted to the Royal Navy's Type 23 frigates.

The Bushmaster II cannon is also used in the Turkish made Aselsan SMASH stabilized weapon station.

The USAF had experimented with installing Bushmaster II cannons on their AC-130U gunships in place of the GAU-12 and Bofors 40 mm cannons. On 11 August 2008, the effort was canceled because of problems with the Bushmaster's accuracy in tests "at the altitude we were employing it." There were also schedule considerations that drove the decision. On 9 July 2012, the Air Force type classified a new version of the Bushmaster called the GAU-23/A. The cannon will be used on the AC-130W and the AC-130J gunships.

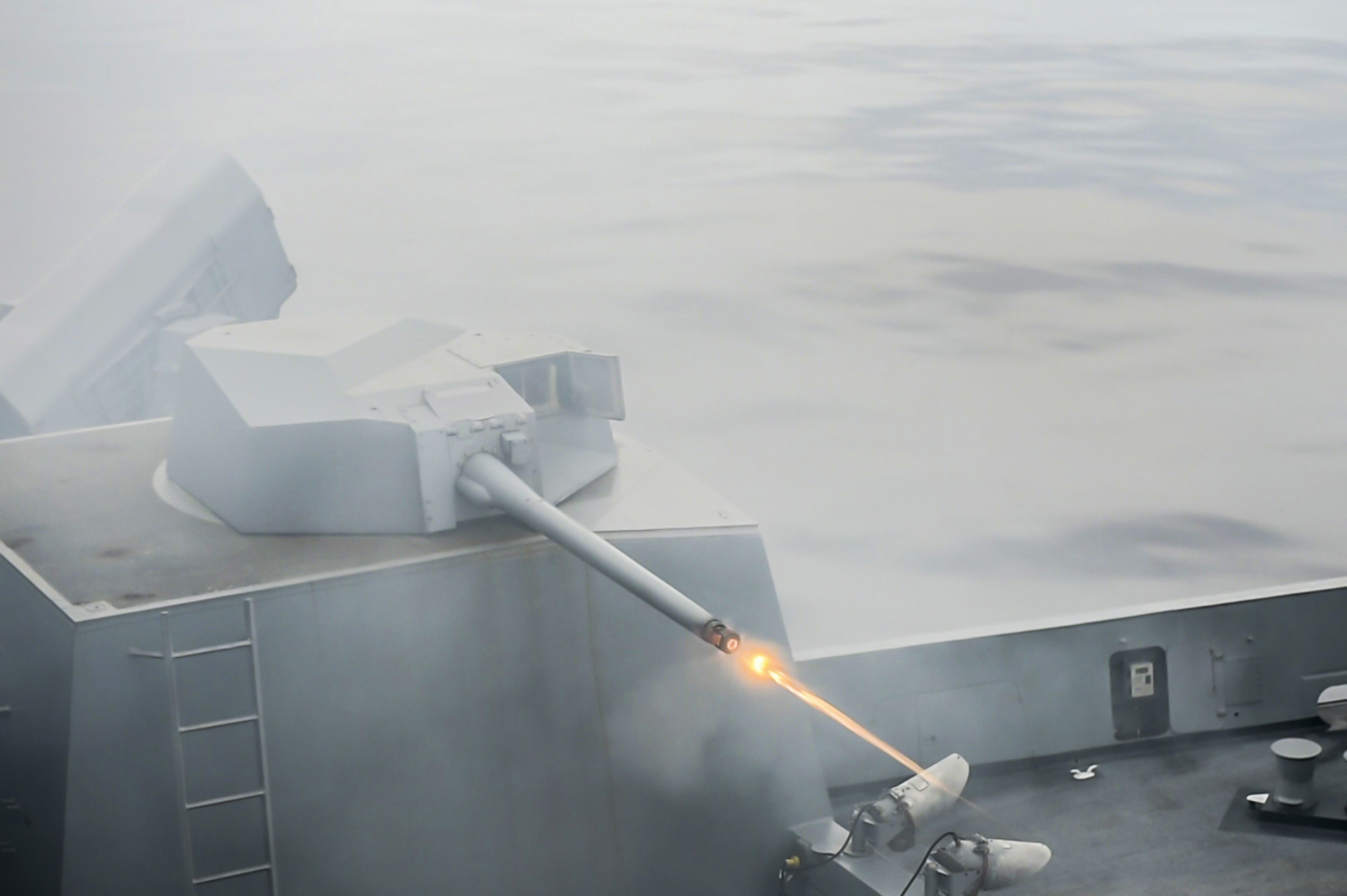
Mk 46 Mod 2 GWS aboard San Antonio-class amphibious transport ship Green Bay, 2016.

The U.S. Navy uses the Mk44 Bushmaster II in the Mk 46 Mod 2 Gun Weapon System (GWS). The GWS is produced by General Dynamics to give warships protection against small, high-speed surface craft. A Mk 46 turret consists of the 30 mm chain gun, a forward looking infrared (FLIR) sensor, a low light television camera, and a laser rangefinder. The guns fire at 200 rounds per minute and are fed by a 400-round magazine through 200-round dual feeds. Effective range is 2,200 yd (2,000 m) for full-caliber high-explosive or armor-piercing ammunition, which can be extended when using sub-caliber rounds. The Mk 46 GWS is permanently installed on the San Antonio-class amphibious transport dock and can be installed on Freedom and Independence-class littoral combat ships as part of the surface warfare (SuW) package. In 2012, the Navy decided to replace the Mk 110 57 mm cannons on Zumwalt-class destroyers with the Mk 46 GWS.

Orbital ATK developed a modified version of the Bushmaster II, known as the Mk44 STRETCH, which can fire the 30×173 mm Mk310 PABM-T airburst round.

In January 2020, Northrop Grumman revealed the development of proximity airburst rounds for the LCS' 30 mm gun modules to destroy small unmanned aerial vehicles (UAVs). Since the modules feature dual feeders, different types of rounds could be fed for different targets.

In October 2023, the UK announced it would be delivering the Terrahawk Paladin to Ukraine as part of assistance during the Russian invasion of Ukraine. The Terrahawk Paladin is made by MSI Defence Systems (MSI-DS) as a land-based version of the Seahawk. It is a static Very Short-Range Air Defense (VSHORAD) Counter Unmanned Aerial Systems (C-UAS) system that can be deployed off a truck. The system combines radars, EO/IR cameras, and laser rangefinders with a 30 mm Mk44 Bushmaster II chain gun with 240 rounds of airburst munitions capable of engaging small UAS out to 2 km (1.2 mi).

== XM813 ==
The XM813 Bushmaster is based on the Mk44 and is offered as an upgrade for U.S. Army M1126 Stryker (adopted as the M1296 Dragoon) and M2 Bradley vehicles, as well as having been a contender to be the primary armament of the Ground Combat Vehicle. The improvements include a 25.4 mm (1.00 in) longer barrel, integral mount to increase first round hit probability by up to 10%, a dual recoil system to enhance accuracy to help cope with future hotter propellants, and a Meggitt linkless dual feed ammunition system. The 30 mm chain gun can fire Mk310 Programmable Air Burst Munition rounds to attack targets in defilade. The United States Army Research, Development and Engineering Command helped enhance the XM813 mainly for safety and turret integration. By changing five parts, the gun caliber can be increased to 40 mm. As of November 2013, the XM813 was being tested at Aberdeen Proving Ground over three months to ensure reliability levels of 40,000 mean rounds between failures. Long-term plans are to equip vehicles with the Bushmaster III 35mm/50mm cannon.

The XM813 was demonstrated in September 2014 at the ARDEC Digital Multi-Purpose Range Complex. The gun was mounted on a Bradley Fighting Vehicle and fired at targets up to 1,500 metres (0.93 mi) away. An enhanced fire control system improves long-range accuracy to kill targets with fewer bursts, sometimes as few as two or three rounds instead of 10. The XM813 30 mm cannon is intended to replace the M242 Bushmaster 25 mm chain gun, and can be mounted on vehicles other than the Bradley. Two capabilities not demonstrated were its linkless ammunition with airburst capabilities; airburst rounds increase lethality by enabling engagement of targets in defilade when they would otherwise only be suppressed by fire.

In early 2015, the U.S. Army approved an upgrade for 81 Stryker vehicles of a Stryker Brigade Combat Team deployed in Europe to be upgunned with the Mk44 30 mm Bushmaster cannon to increase their lethality against other light armored vehicles used by Russia in the theater. The cannons will be installed by 2018, and may be the first step in adding the Bushmaster to the entire active fleet of about 1,000 Strykers; the XM813 variant will be used with the Strykers. The XM813 has a demonstrated firing ability out to 3,000 metres (1.9 mi) for precision firing, nearly twice as far as the M2 12.7 mm caliber machine gun that has a maximum effective range of 1,830 metres (1.14 mi) as an area suppression weapon. The first upgunned Stryker, known as the "Dragoon" for the 2nd Cavalry Regiment the vehicles will be part of, was delivered in October 2016, and the first Infantry Carrier Vehicle - Dragoon (ICVD) was delivered to the 2CR in Germany in December 2017.

The ATK MK44-ABM variant of the Bushmaster was selected in 2018 by the Spanish Army to equip the Tizona turret of the Line version (IFV) of the Dragón IFV, the replacement of the Pegaso BMR.

== Programming kit ==
A programming kit from Rheinmetall Oerlikon can be adapted to the Mk44 Bushmaster. With this kit, AHEAD 30mm air-burst ammunition can be shot from this cannon. The kit is the same as the ones used on the autocannons MK 30-2/ABM and the Oerlikon KCE, and was adapted for the Mk44.

== Users ==
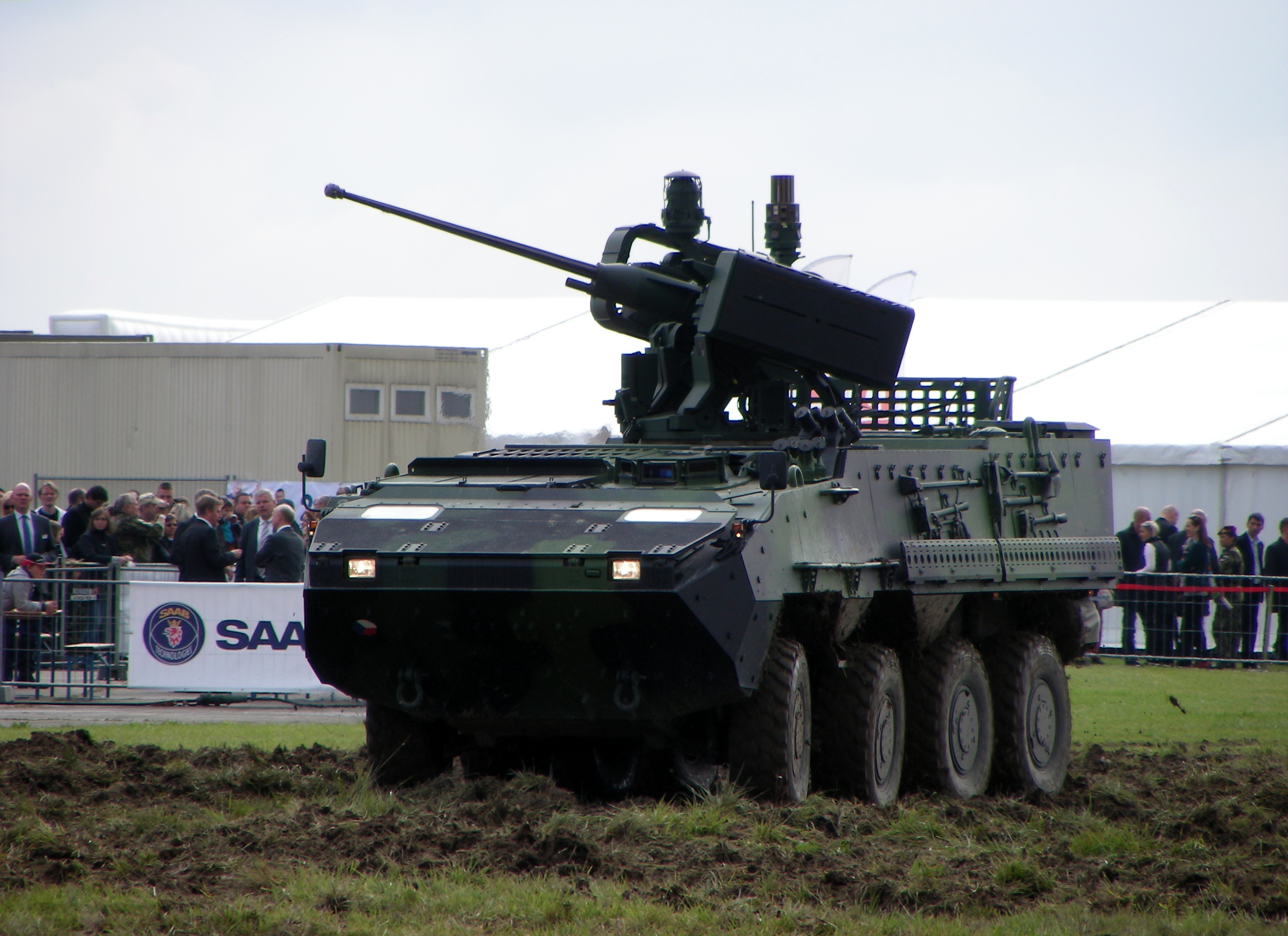
RCWS-30 mount on Czech Pandur II.

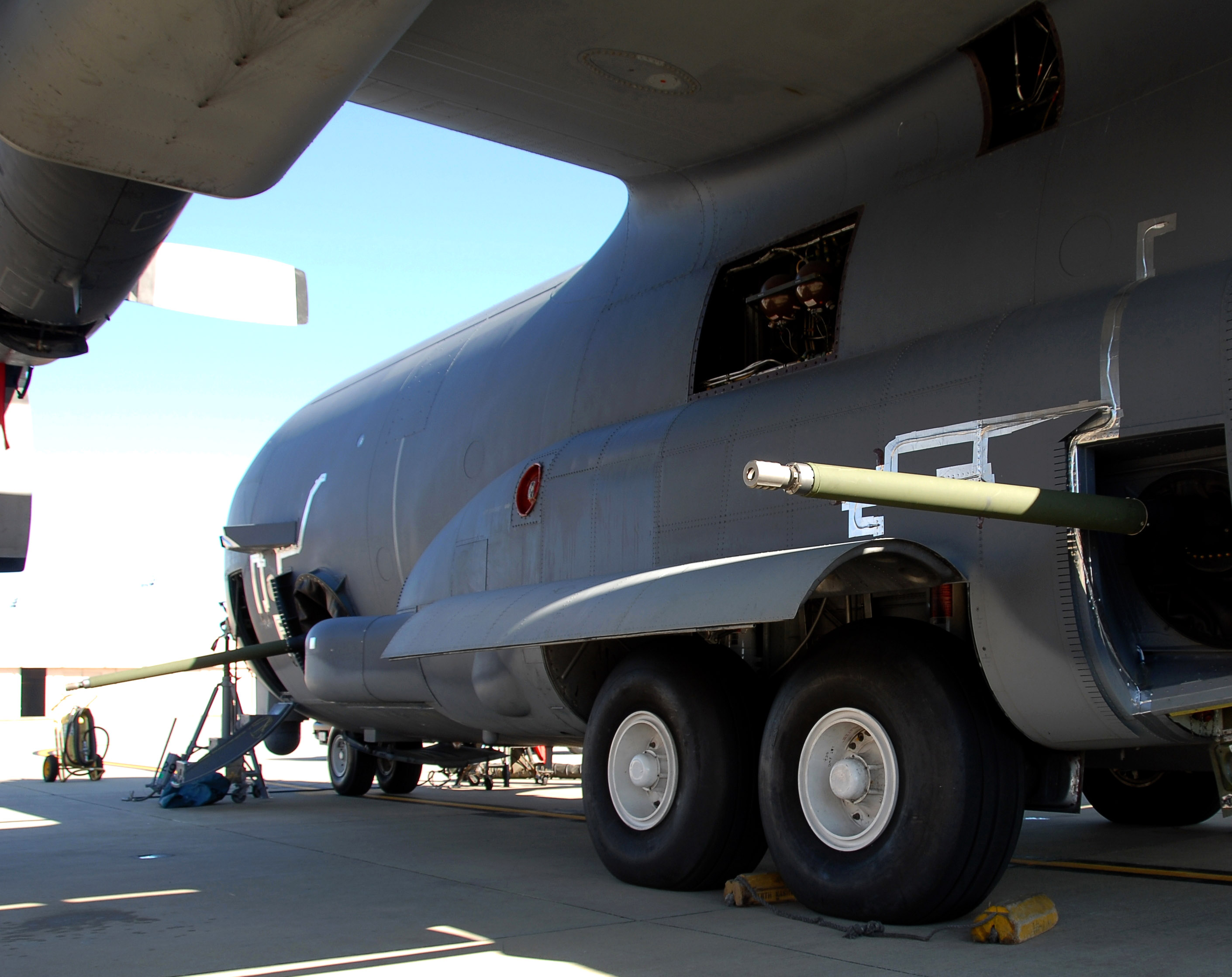
AC-130U with a trial installation of two Mk 44 weapons.

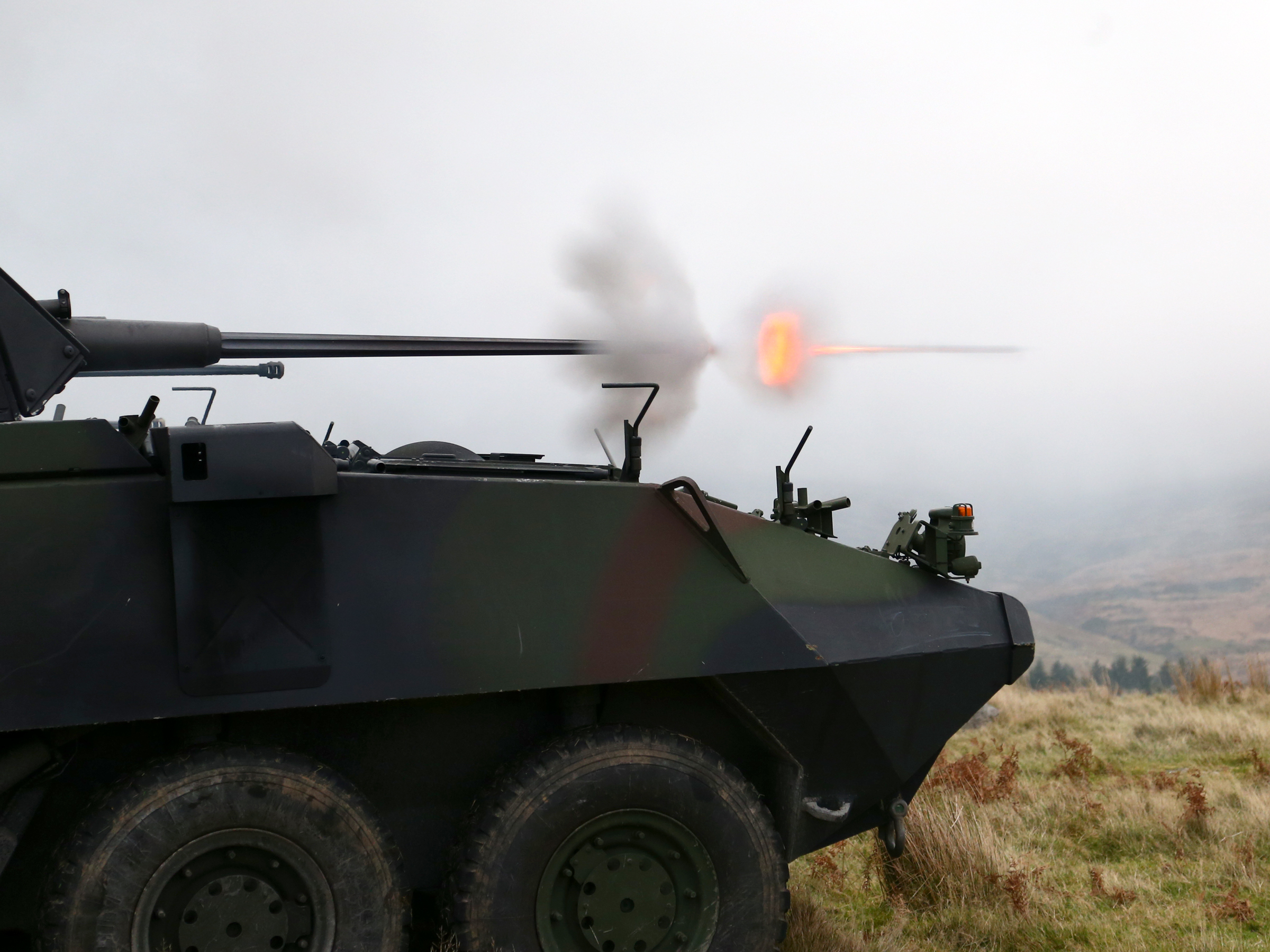
Irish Mowag Piranha shooting Mk 44 Bushmaster II.

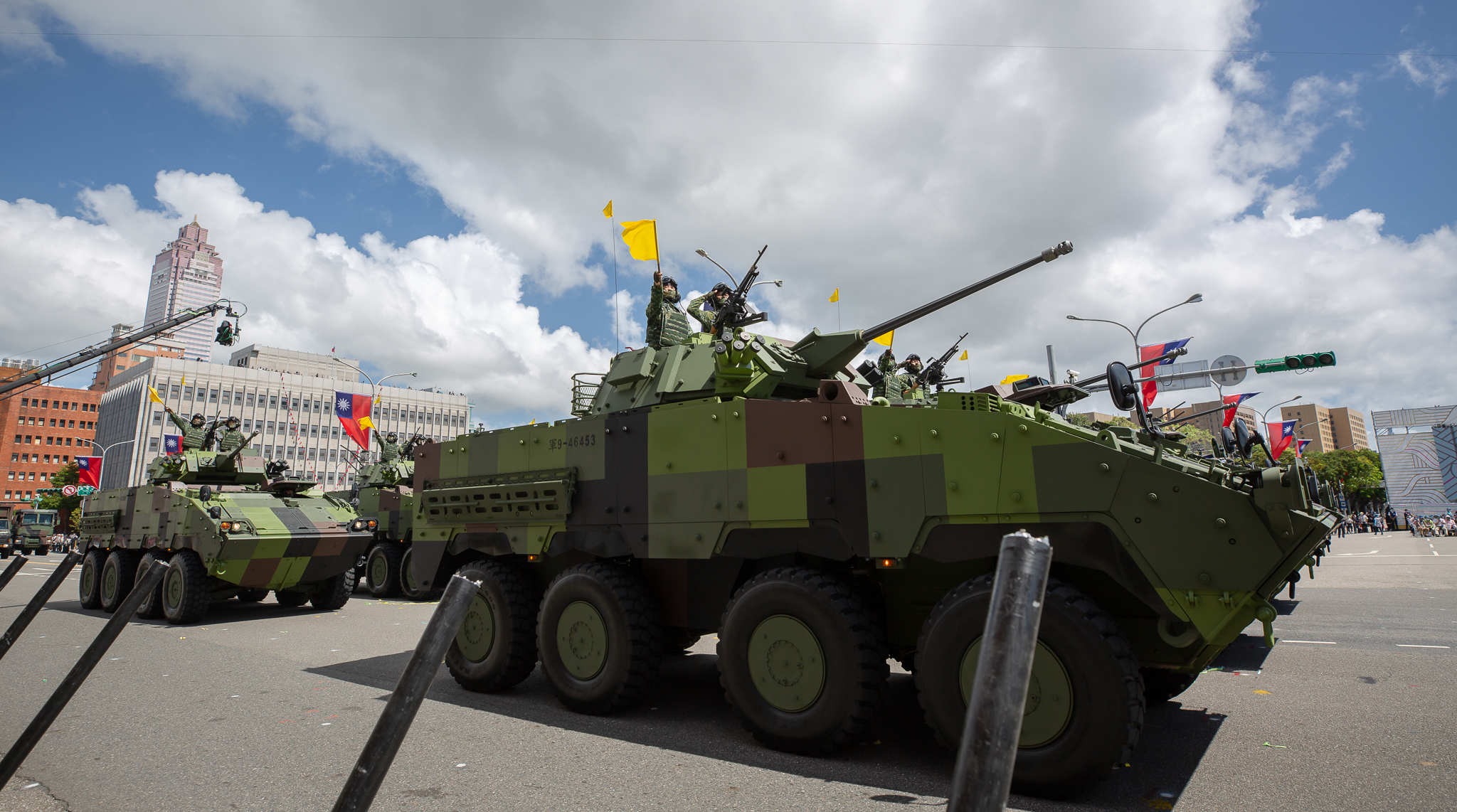
Taiwan CM-34 with 30 mm Mk44 Bushmaster II cannon

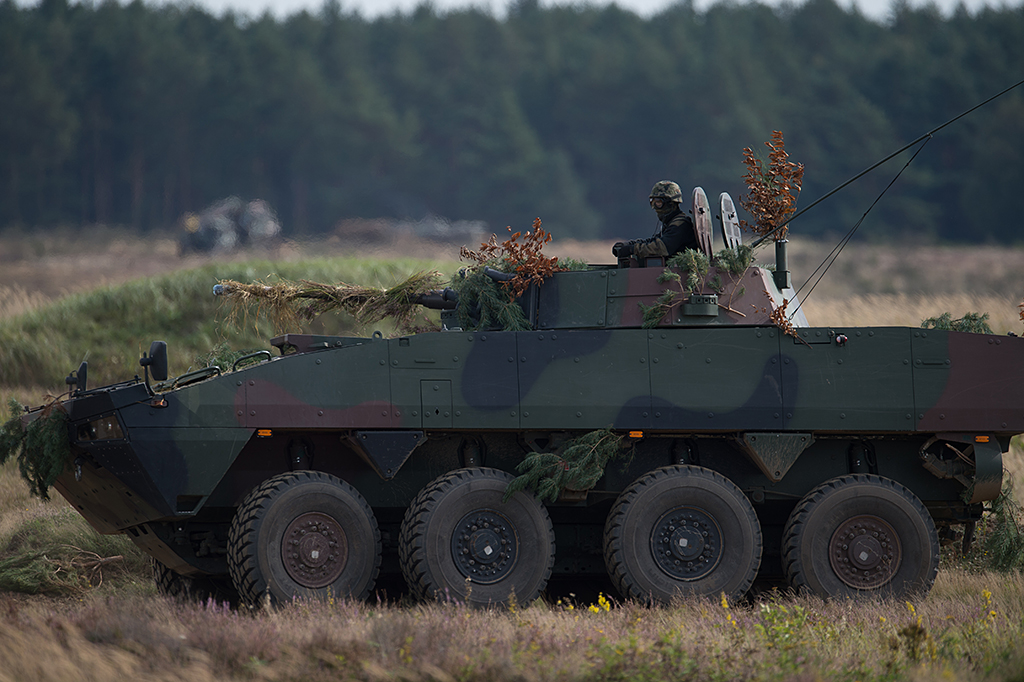
Polish KTO Rosomak with 30 mm Mk44 Bushmaster

=== 30 mm cannons ===
Argentina

- Navy: Gowind-class corvette

Australia

- Army: AS21 Redback (EOS T-2000 turret)

Belgium

- Army: Piranha IIIC DF30

Botswana

- Army: Mowag Piranha IIIC

Brazil

- Army: VBTP-MR Guarani
- Navy: Amazonas-class corvette, NAM Atlântico aircraft carrier

Bulgaria

- Army: XM1296 Stryker Dragoon

Croatia

- Army: Patria AMV (Elbit UT30 Mk2 turret)

Czech Republic

- Army: Pandur II CZ, CV9030CZ

Finland

- Army: CV9030FIN

Ghana

- Army: Sentinel II 8×8, Sentinel II 6×6 (with Elbit UT30 turret)

Indonesia

- Army: Pindad Cobra IFV (ARES UT30 MK2 turret)
- Navy: Mamuju-class, Pari-class patrol vessel, Pollux-class research vessel and Clurit-class fast attack craft
- Coast Guard: Tanjung Datu-class patrol vessel, Pulau Nipah-class patrol vessel and Bintang Laut-class patrol vessel

Japan

- Coast Guard: Hateruma-class patrol vessels, Kunigami-class patrol vessels (later ships), & Iwami-class patrol vessels
- Common tactical wheeled vehicle:
  - ICV - Infantry combat vehicle
  - RCV - Reconnaissance combat vehicle

Iraq

- Navy: Swiftships patrol boats

Ireland

- Army: Mowag Piranha IIIH

Italy

- Army: Freccia EVO (Combat and Reconnaissance variants)

Lithuania

- Army: Vilkas (Orbital ATK Mk44S variant)

Malaysia

- Malaysian Navy: Maharaja Lela-class frigate

Netherlands

- Navy: Holland-class offshore patrol vessel and Karel Doorman-class support ship

Norway

- Army: CV9030N

Oman

- Navy: Khareef-class corvettes

Philippines

- Navy: Jose Rizal-class frigates and Shaldag Mk.V missile fast attack craft

Poland

- Army: Rosomak (Hitfist and ZSSW-30), Borsuk, CBWP Heavy IFV

Romania

- Army: Mowag Piranha V

Saudi Arabia

- National Guard: LAV-700 IFV (CMCT turret)

Singapore

- Army: Bionix II, Hunter AFV

Spain

- Army: Piranha V - Dragon (219 VCR, 14 VCR-PC, 58 VEC)

Switzerland

- Army: CV9030CH

Taiwan

- Army: CM-34 (IFV variant)
- Military police: CM-34 (IFV variant)

Thailand

- Navy: Tachin-class frigate, Naresuan-class frigate, Krabi-class offshore patrol vessel, Leamsing-class patrol craft (gun), T.991-class coastal patrol craft, T.994-class coastal patrol craft, Angthong-class amphibious transport dock and Ladya-class mine countermeasure vessel

Ukraine

- Army: XM1296 Stryker Dragoon, KTO Rosomak (Hitfist-30P)

United Kingdom

- Navy: River-class Batch II offshore patrol vessels, Type 23 frigate, Type 45 destroyer

United States

- Army: XM1296 Stryker Dragoon
- USMC: ACV (Iveco SuperAV with Kongsberg MCT-30 turret)
- Navy: San Antonio-class transport ship, Littoral combat ship and Zumwalt-class destroyer
- Air Force: AC-130W, AC-130J (GAU-23/A)
- Coast Guard: Polar Security Cutter

== Munitions ==
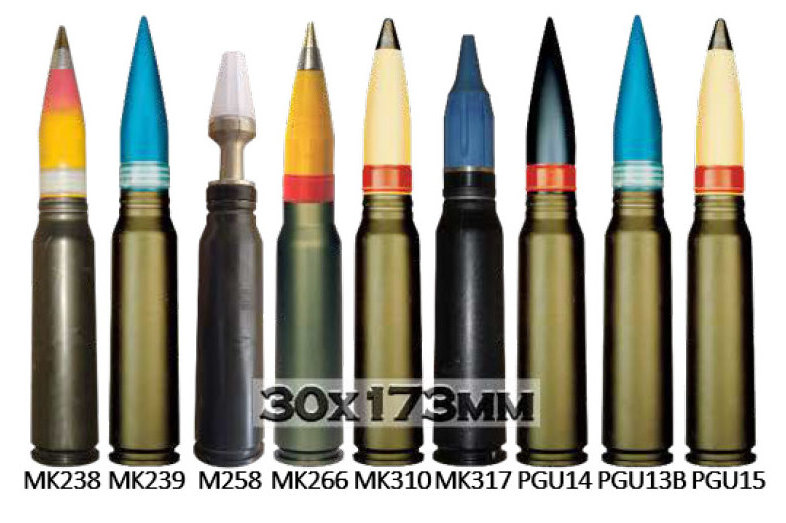
30 x 173 munitions

name	short description	notes
MK238	High Explosive Incendiary-Tracer (HEI-T)	This round self-destructs if it misses its target.
MK239	Target Practice Traced (TP-T)	training ammunition, ballistically matched with the MK264.
MK258	Armor Piercing, Fin Stabilized, Discarding Sabot-Tracer (APFSDS-T)	The round is designed to be "supercavitating" to increase its effectiveness when fired at targets like underwater mines.
MK264	Multi Purpose Low Drag-Tracer(MPLD-T)	Light armor-piercing capability with a delayed explosive reaction using a chemical fuze. It is available with and without Self Destruct (SD).
MK266	High Explosive Incendiary-Tracer (HEI-T)	An update to an earlier round, with enhanced range.
MK310	Programmable Air Burst Munition-Tracer (PABM-T)	Can be programmed to explode in the air above target to wound or kill enemies behind cover.
MK317	Target Practice Discarding Sabot-Tracer (TPDS-T)	A training round.
PGU14/B	Armor Piercing Incendiary (API)	A relatively lightweight projectile with a core of dense depleted uranium penetrator.
PGU13D/B	High Explosive Incendiary (HEI)	Aircraft mounted cannons use the round against personnel, trucks, ammunition storage, and other targets.
PGU15A/B	Target Practice (TP)	A training round with the same ballistic properties of PGU13D/B.

== See also ==
- Bushmaster 25 mm chain gun
- Bushmaster III 35/50 mm chain gun
- Bushmaster IV 40 mm chain gun
- 30mm Shipunov 2A42—Soviet/Russian autocannon
- 30mm L21A1 RARDEN—British autocannon
- Future Combat Systems Infantry Carrier Vehicle
