= Chain gun =

Firearm mechanism that uses an external source of power to cycle the firearm

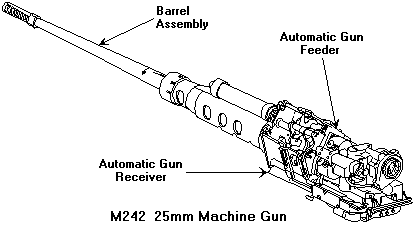
The M242 25 mm chain gun

Chain gun main component

A chain gun is a type of autocannon or machine gun that uses an external source of power to cycle the weapon's action via a continuous loop of chain, similar to that used on a motorcycle or bicycle, instead of diverting excess energy from the cartridges' propellant as in a typical automatic firearm.

== History ==
In 1972, Hughes Helicopters began a company-funded research effort to design a single machine gun to fire the U.S. Army's M50 20 mm round. In April 1973, the program fired test rounds in more powerful 30 mm WECOM linked ammunition, from a prototype A model. In January 1975, a model "C" was added, a linkless version for the proposed Advanced Attack Helicopter YAH-64. The helicopter was later adopted as the Hughes Model 77/AH-64A Apache, with the model C receiving the designation M230 chain gun as its standard armament.

In 1976, Hughes Helicopters patented the chain gun, and it has since been further developed into several other systems of different calibers.

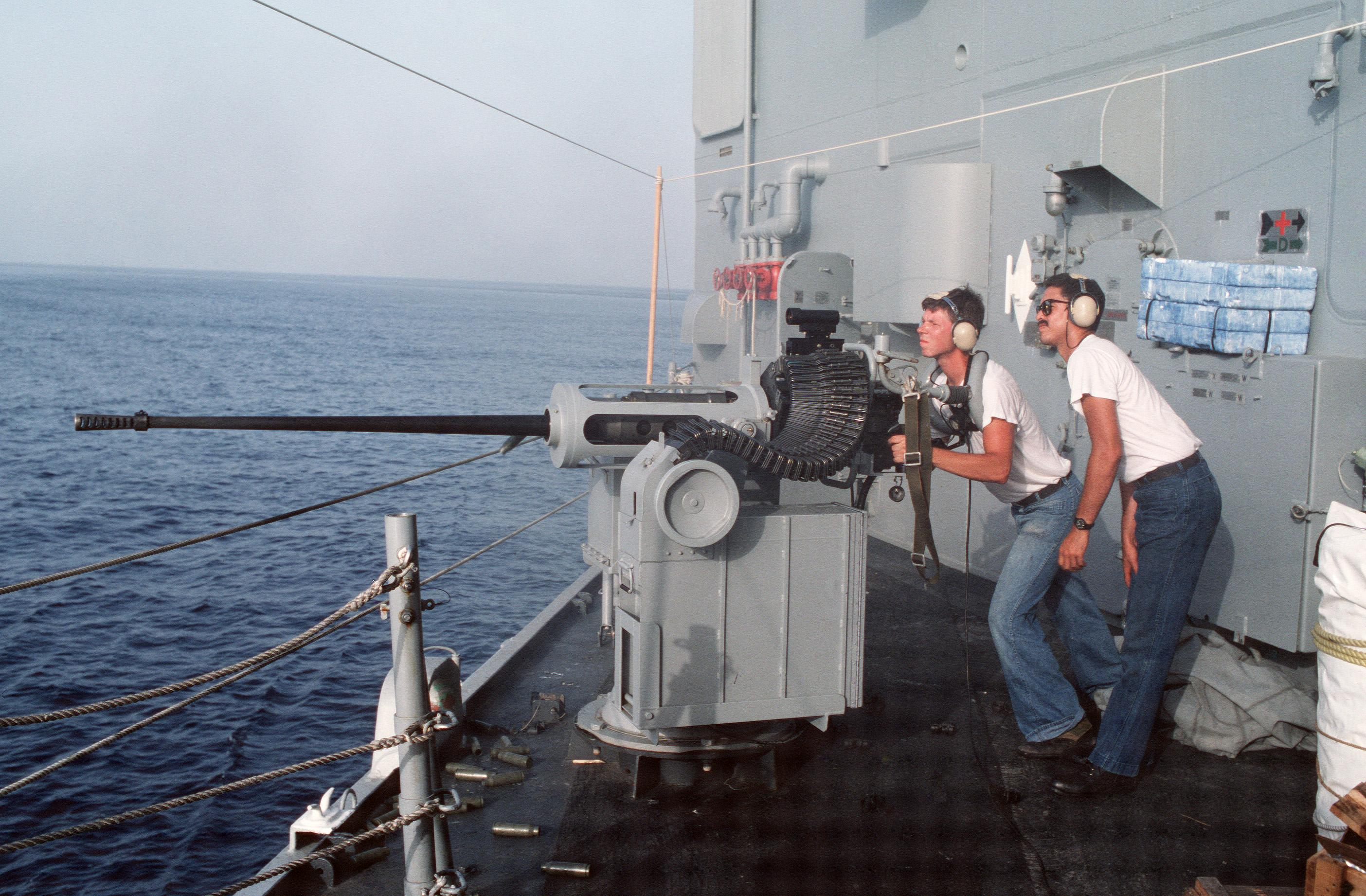
A M242 Mk 38 chain gun mounted on USS Nicholas (FFG-47)

As of 2019, "chain gun" is a registered trademark of Northrop Grumman Innovation Systems, formerly Orbital ATK, following several mergers and acquisitions after Hughes Helicopters, for "externally-powered machine guns".

== Design ==
How a chain gun works

There are several differences between chain guns and other types of autocannon. While rotary guns can also use an external source of power to cycle the weapon's mechanism, they have multiple rotating barrels, unlike chain guns. The necessary actions are performed by complex rotating cam mechanisms, not a chain.

Recoil-operated guns, e.g. many machine guns, the Bofors gun, and gas-operated guns, e.g. most assault rifles and the ShVAK cannon, depend upon the firing of the cartridges of the weapon's ammunition to power the cycle of action, instead of an external power source. As a cartridge may misfire - completely fail to fire, hang fire - or discharge with insufficient force to cycle the mechanism, this fundamental dependence affects the reliability of such weapons.

In contrast, in a chain gun the action of the firearm is cycled by a roller chain, driven by an electric motor. The chain moves in a rectangular circuit around four sprockets that apply tension to it. One link of the chain is connected to the bolt assembly, moving it back and forth to load, fire, extract, and eject cartridges.

Each full cycle consists of four different periods of the key link travelling along the circuit. Two periods, the passage along the "long" sides of the rectangle, control the movement of the bolt: the time that the bolt takes to drive forward and load a round into the chamber, and how quickly the bolt retracts and extracts the spent cartridge after firing. The other two periods, when the chain moves across the "short" sides of the rectangle, sideways relative to the axis of the barrel, determine how long the breech remains locked while firing, and open to allow cartridge extraction and ventilation of fumes.

A misfired round does not stop the functioning of the weapon, as it might with guns that use energy from a fired cartridge to load the next round. It is simply ejected. Thus, the chain gun operating principle is inherently reliable. An unclassified report on the EX-34 prepared by the Naval Surface Weapons Center in Dahlgren, Virginia, dated 23 September 1983, said that:

29,721 rounds of endurance tests were fired with no parts breakage and without any gun stoppages ... It is significant that during firing of 101,343 rounds not one jam or stoppage occurred due to loss of round control in the gun or feeder mechanism ... [this] is in our experience very unusual in any weapon of any caliber or type.

The time that the chain takes to move around a complete loop of the rectangle controls the rate of fire. Accordingly, varying the motor-speed allows a chain gun, in principle, to fire at a continuously variable rate from single rounds to the maximum safe rate. The maximum rate depends on the pressure drop rates in the barrel after firing a cartridge, on mechanical tolerances, and other factors. For example, the 7.62mm NATO version EX-34 was advertised to fire 570 rounds per minute, and developmental work was underway for a 1,000-rounds-per-minute version. In practice, chain guns usually have two or three set firing speeds.

== Examples ==
Chain gun	Calibre	Uses
L94A1	7.62×51mm	AFVs such as Challenger 2 and FV510 Warrior (coaxial gun)
AAI In-Line	7.62×51mm	Prototype multiple-barrel externally driven machine gun using a chain
Profense PF 50	12.7×99mm	
Northrop Grumman Sky Viper	20×102mm	Experimental derivative of the M230
M242 Bushmaster	25×137mm	AFVs such as the M2 Bradley and LAV-25, Mk 38 mount on warships
Mk44 Bushmaster II	30×173mm	AFVs such as CV90, as the DS30M and Mk 46 mounts on warships
M230	30×113mmB	AH-64 Apache
Bushmaster III	35×228mm	AFVs such as CV90
Bushmaster IV	40×365mmR	Uses the same ammunition as the Bofors 40mm L/70 cannon
XM813 Bushmaster II	40×180mm	
XM913 Bushmaster III	50x228mm	Designed to fire the programmable XM1204 High Explosive Air Burst round

== See also ==
- Polybolos
- Revolver cannon
- Rotary cannon

== Bibliography ==
- Chinn, George M. (Lt.Col. USMC Retd), ed. (1987). The Machine Gun: History, Evolution, and Development of Manual, Automatic, and Airborne Repeating Weapons (PDF). Vol. V. Ann Arbor, Michigan: Edward Brothers Publishing Co.
- Richardson, Doug & Peacock, Lindsay (1992). Combat Aircraft: AH-64 Apache. London: Salamander Books. ISBN 0-86101-675-0.
- U.S. Army Field Manual 3-22.1
