= Bushmaster IV =

- Type: Chain-driven autocannon
- Place of origin: United States

Production history
- Designer: Alliant Techsystems
- Manufacturer: Alliant Techsystems

Specifications
- Mass: Receiver: 198 kg (437 lb); Feeder: 29 kg (64 lb); Barrel: 138 kg (304 lb); Total: 365 kg (805 lb)
- Length: 4,018 mm (158.2 in)
- Width: 430 mm (17 in)
- Height: 478 mm (18.8 in)
- Cartridge: 40×365mmR
- Action: Open bolt
- Feed system: Linkless feed

The Bushmaster IV is a 40 mm chain-driven autocannon designed and built by Alliant Techsystems, based on the M242 Bushmaster, Bushmaster II and Bushmaster III. The Bushmaster IV fires 40×365mmR 3P (Prefragmented, Programmable, Proximity-fuzed), APFSDS-T Mk I, and APFSDS-T Mk II rounds. The 3P round will provide air burst capability and the APFSDS-T Mk II can penetrate armor with a thickness in excess of 150 mm (5.9 in).

== Specifications ==
The Bushmaster IV requires 5 hp (3.7 kW) at 24 volts to operate, fires from a cook off safe open bolt with absolute hangfire protection, and ejects forwards. It fires NATO standard 40×365mm ammunition from an integral linkless feed and has a recoil force of 62,272 N (13,999 lbf). The ammunition was originally developed for the Bofors 40mm L/70 cannon.

== See also ==
- M230 30 mm autocannon
- M242 Bushmaster 25 mm chain gun
- Bushmaster II 30 mm chain gun
- Bushmaster III 35 mm chain gun
- Bofors 40 mm L/70
