= Bushmaster III =

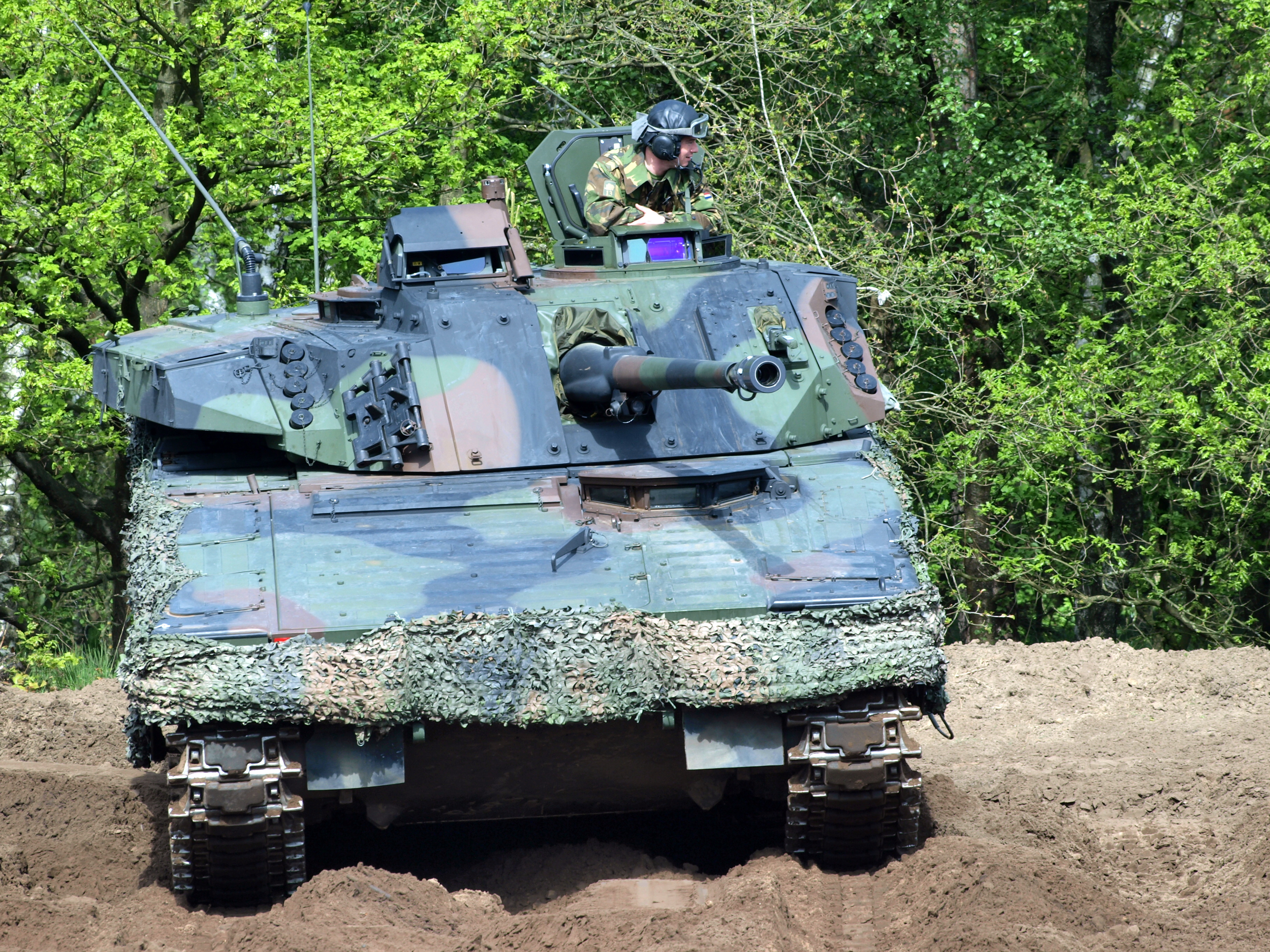
- CV9035 in Dutch service
- Type: Automatic cannon
- Place of origin: United States

Service history
- In service: 2008–present
- Used by: Danish Defence, Armed forces of the Netherlands, Estonian Defence Forces

Production history
- Manufacturer: Alliant Techsystems (now Northrop Grumman)
- Produced: 1998–present

Specifications
- Mass: Total: 480 lb (218 kg); Barrel: 250 lb (113 kg)
- Length: 158.19 in (4,018 mm)
- Shell: 35 × 228 mm 50 × 228 mm (XM913); 50 × 319 mm
- Caliber: 35 mm (1.4 in)
- Action: Chain gun: open bolt, forward ejection
- Rate of fire: Cyclic: 200 rounds/minute
- Muzzle velocity: 1,180 m/s (3,871 ft/s)
- Feed system: Dual linked and linkless, 24 volts

The Bushmaster III is a 35 mm automatic/semi-automatic cannon designed and built by Alliant Techsystems, based on the 25 mm M242 Bushmaster. The weapon has been selected as primary armament for the CV9035 export versions of the CV90 infantry fighting vehicles (IFV) currently in service with the Danish, Dutch and Estonian armies. The Bushmaster III is a chain gun, like the other members of the Bushmaster family, which grants it great dependability and safety from ammunition cook-off even though it does result in lower rates of fire. The caliber is the NATO standard 35×228 introduced by the Oerlikon KD in the 1950s.

== 50 mm version ==
The U.S. Army is testing the Bushmaster 50 mm cannon as a counter rocket, artillery, and mortar (C-RAM) and counter unmanned aerial vehicle (C-UAV) weapon. Initially developed under the Extended Area Protection and Survivability Integrated Demonstration (EAPS ID), it fires a 50×319 mm cartridge and has been successfully tested in tracking distant moving targets using interferometric radar as a sensor, fire control computer, and radio frequency transmitter and receiver to launch a course-correcting projectile. The command guided interceptors have a thruster that receives commands for maneuvering and warhead detonation, with a tantalum-tungsten alloy liner to form forward propelled penetrators to defeat C-RAM targets, and steel body fragments to destroy UAVs. The systems can destroy UAVs at a range of 1 km (0.62 mi) and at a height of 1,500 m (4,900 ft). Converting the Bushmaster III to the 50 mm version can be accomplished by changing the barrel and a few key parts allowing it to fire the SuperShot 50 cartridge.

Separately, under the Army's Advanced Lethality and Accuracy System for Medium Caliber (ALAS-MC) effort, Northrop Grumman (which had acquired Alliant Techsystems) was contracted to develop a 50 mm derivative of the Bushmaster III called the XM913 for the Next Generation Combat Vehicle (NGCV), later designated the XM30 Mechanized Infantry Combat Vehicle (MICV), that would replace the Bradley Fighting Vehicle. Although a further evolution of the Bushmaster III, this weapon fires the 50×228 mm cartridge rather than the 50×319 mm SuperShot 50 cartridge of the previous up-gunned variant. Various rounds include the XM1203 armor piercing sabot round and XM1204 high explosive round with a programmable fuse including delay and airburst.

== Specifications ==
- Recoil: 14,000 lb (6300 kg)
- Weight:

Receiver: 150 lb (68 kg)
Feeder: 80 lb (36 kg)
Barrel: 250 lb (113 kg^{1})
Total: 480 lb (218 kg)

- Rate of Fire: Semi-automatic or 200 rpm
- Power Required: 3.0 horsepower (2.2 kW) at 24 volts
- Clearing Method: Open Bolt, semi-closed bolt
- Safety: Absolute hangfire protection
- Case Ejection: Forward

^{1} Includes gun barrel, drive motor, recoil system and integral dual feeder.

== See also ==
- M230 30 mm automatic cannon
- Bushmaster II 30 mm chain gun
- XM913 chain gun
- Bushmaster IV 40 mm chain gun
- Oerlikon GDF
- Bofors 40 mm Automatic Gun L/70
