= L94A1 chain gun =

L94A1
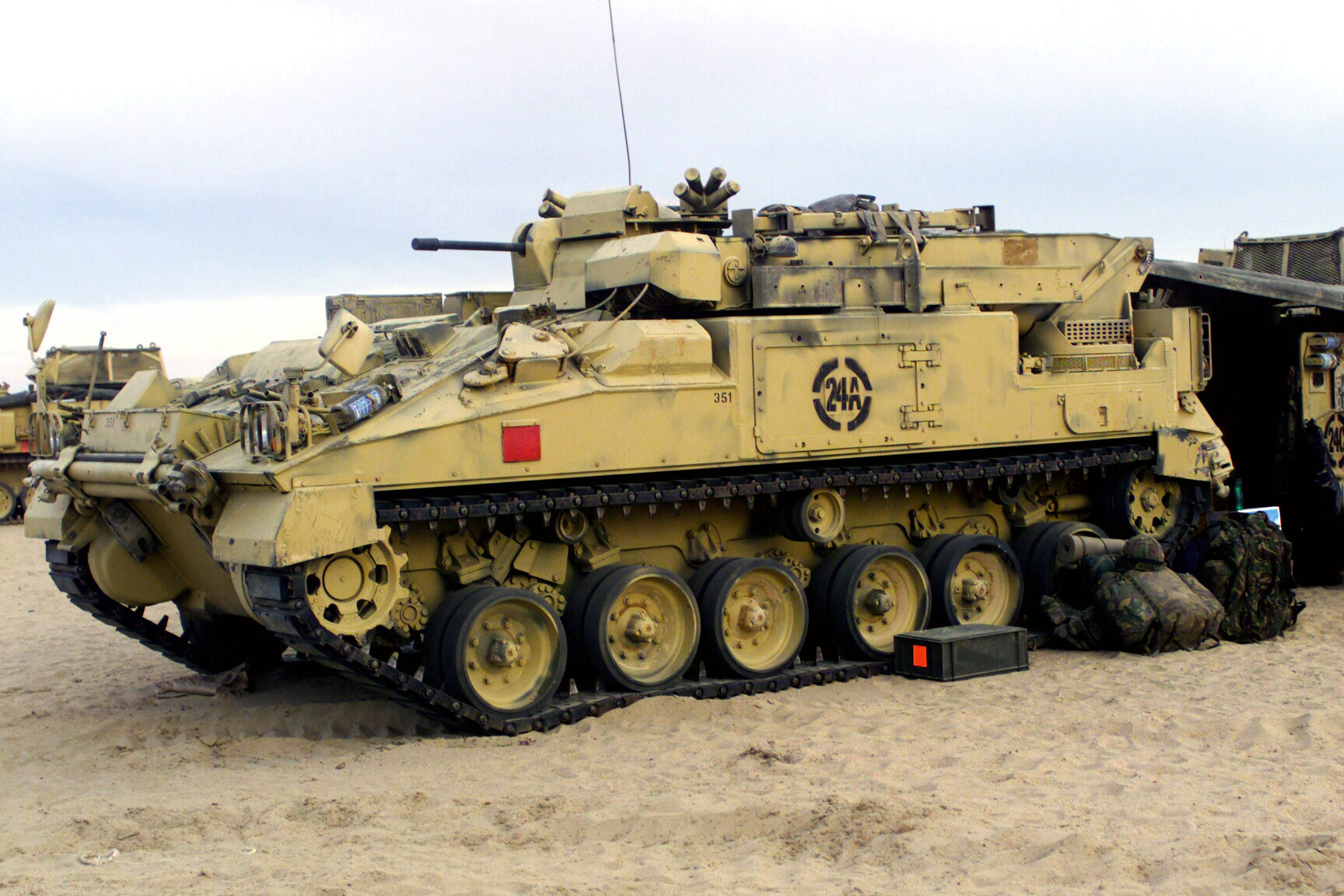
- L94A1 mounted in the turret of an FV512.
- Type: Chain gun
- Place of origin: United Kingdom

Service history
- Used by: British Army
- Wars: Gulf War, 2003 invasion of Iraq

Production history
- Manufacturer: Heckler & Koch
- Unit cost: £ 7,920
- Produced: 1980 to early 1990s, 1996–1998
- Variants: EX-31, L95A1 (short-barrelled version)

Specifications
- Mass: 17.86 kg
- Length: 1.25 m
- Barrel length: 703 mm
- Cartridge: 7.62 × 51 mm NATO (linked)
- Calibre: 7.62 mm
- Action: Electrically driven
- Rate of fire: 520 to 550 rounds per minute
- Muzzle velocity: 862 m/s
- Feed system: Disintegrating-link belt

L94A1 is the British Ministry of Defence designation for the long-barrelled version of the Hughes EX-34 7.62 mm chain gun, which is fitted to several British Army armoured fighting vehicles, including the Challenger 2 and the Warrior. A second version with a shorter barrel, designated L95A1, was also procured in small numbers.

The weapon was produced by Heckler & Koch in the UK.

== Design ==
The EX-34 was specifically designed for use as a coaxial weapon in armoured vehicles, and has a number of features that make it suitable for this role. The gun is externally powered, meaning that misfires do not need to be manually cleared; instead, the rounds are simply ejected. All spent cases are ejected forwards out of the turret. This prevents any build-up of spent shell cases causing stoppages. Additionally, all gas generated by firing is vented through the barrel and ejection tube, preventing the build-up of toxic gases inside the armoured vehicle. The weapon is cooled by a venturi system, which draws cool air down the jacket and acts as a fume extractor.

The weapon was originally intended as a replacement for the coaxial weapon in the American M60 tank. The weapon was evaluated by both the US Army and the US Naval weapon center, who reported that the performance of the weapon was outstanding during all phases of testing. However, neither chose to adopt the weapon.

During testing conducted by Hughes, the weapon proved extremely reliable, firing two 10,000 round bursts lasting 20 minutes at 500 rounds per minute. It has a reported rounds between failure rate of approximately 50,000 rounds.

== Problems ==
Problems with the electrical systems in the Warrior IFV have caused the weapon to fire without warning several times, resulting in the army issuing a safety notice. In at least one incident, this has resulted in injury to a British soldier and in others injuries to civilians. The MoD denied the problem initially.

Additionally, the Challenger 2 mounting of the weapon cannot be accurately aimed using the main sight below a minimum range of 200 meters, which has led to at least one death from "friendly fire".
