= Rheinmetall Seahawk =

Maritime weapon system

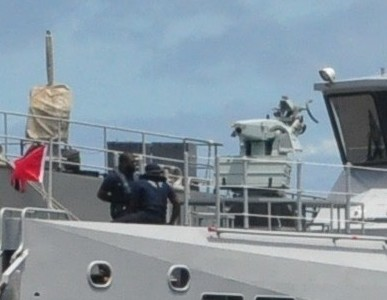
Trinidad and Tobago used a Rheinmetall Seahawk mounting system, bearing a 20mm autocannon, as the main armament on some of its patrol vessels.

The Rheinmetall Seahawk is the maritime adaptation of Rheinmetall's remotely controlled weapon system. A range of calibers can be mounted on the system.

According to Jane's Defence Weekly the system uses the same sensors and servos as the manufacturer's larger naval guns. The manufacturer can provide its low-weight version, mounting an autocannon of up to 40mm, or an ultralight version of the mounting, suitable for mounting machine guns or automatic grenade launchers on small patrol boats.

The mounting is capable of allowing the operator to electronically switch ammunition from two different magazines.

Sensors include an infrared camera, a low-light camera, and a laser range finder.
