= M242 Bushmaster =

American autocannon

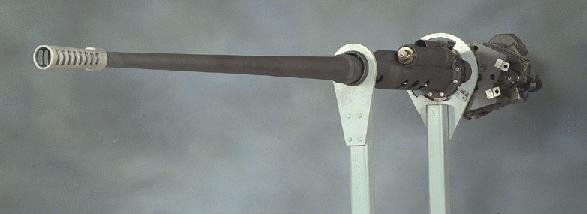
- U.S. Army press photo of a M242 Bushmaster
- Type: Chain gun autocannon
- Place of origin: United States

Service history
- In service: 1981–present
- Used by: See Operators

Production history
- Designer: Hughes Helicopters
- Designed: 1976
- Manufacturer: Hughes Helicopters (1981–1985); McDonnell Douglas Helicopters (1985–2002); Alliant Techsystems (2002–2015); Orbital ATK (2015–2018); Northrop Grumman Innovation Systems (2018–present)
- Produced: 1981–present
- No. built: >11,000
- Variants: See variants

Specifications
- Mass: 119 kilograms (262 lb)
- Length: 2,672 mm (105.2 in)
- Barrel length: 2,175 mm (85.6 in)
- Width: 318 mm (12.5 in)
- Height: 373 mm (14.7 in)
- Shell: 25 × 137 mm
- Barrels: Single barrel (progressive RH parabolic twist)
- Action: Externally powered, chain driven, open bolt
- Rate of fire: Cyclic: 200 rpm with 1 hp or 500 rpm with 8 hp
- Muzzle velocity: 1,100 metres per second (3,600 ft/s)
- Effective firing range: 3,000 metres (9,800 ft)
- Maximum firing range: 6,800 metres (22,300 ft)

The M242 Bushmaster chain gun is a 25 mm (25×137mm) single-barrel chain-driven autocannon. It is used extensively by the U.S. military, such as in the Bradley fighting vehicle, as well as by other NATO members and some other nations in ground combat vehicles and various watercraft. Hughes Helicopters in Culver City, California, was the original designer and manufacturer. As of 2019, Northrop Grumman Innovation Systems produces the gun.

It is an externally-powered, chain-driven, single-barrel weapon that may be fired in semi-automatic, burst, or automatic modes. It is fed by a metallic link belt and has dual-feed capability. The term chain gun derives from the use of a roller chain that drives the bolt back and forth. The gun can destroy lightly armored vehicles and aerial targets such as helicopters and other slow-flying aircraft. It can also apply suppression fire against exposed troops, dug-in positions, and occupied built-up areas. The standard rate of fire is 200 rounds per minute. The weapon has an effective range of 2,000 metres (6,600 ft), depending on the type of ammunition used. With over 11,000 units sold worldwide, it is one of the most successful modern autocannons.

== Description ==
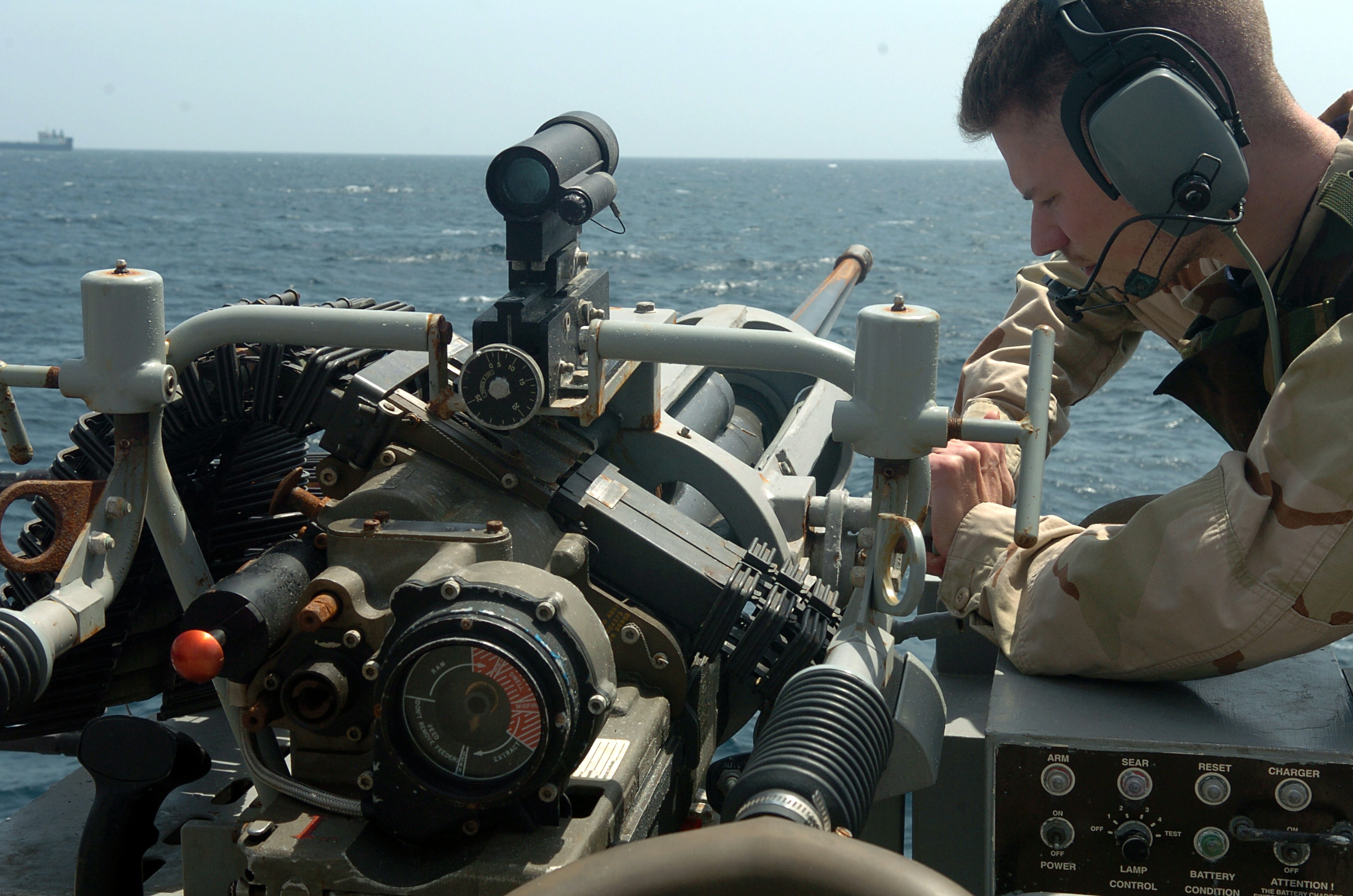
Close up of the MK 38 naval variant

Unlike most automatic firearms, the M242 does not depend on gas or recoil to actuate its firing system. Instead, it uses a 1 hp (0.75 kW) DC motor, positioned in the receiver, to drive the chain and dual-feed system. This system uses sprockets and extractor grooves to feed, load, fire, extract, and eject rounds. A system of clutches provides for an alternate sprocket to engage and thus allows the gunner to switch between armor-piercing and high-explosive rounds.

The weapon assembly consists of three parts: the barrel assembly, the feeder assembly, and the receiver assembly. The three-part structure makes it possible for a two-person team to install or remove the system (under ideal conditions) despite its considerable total weight.

The M242 weapon system has both electrical and manual fire control and can be operated electrically or manually. The gunner can choose from three rates of fire:

- Single shot semi-automatic, in which the gunner can shoot as fast as the trigger can be operated, limited only by the electrical drive speed (it cannot exceed the "high rate" firing speed).
- Low rate fully automatic, in which the weapon fires 100 rounds per minute, ± 25 rounds.
- High rate fully automatic, in which the weapon fires 200 rounds per minute, ± 25 rounds.

== History ==
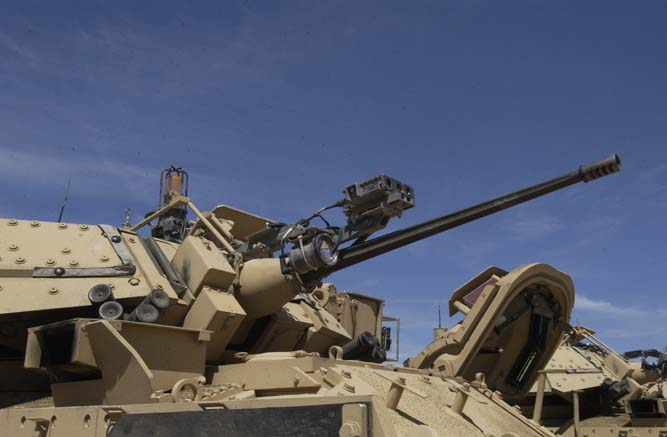
An enhanced M242 with a fluted barrel on an M2 Bradley (the top-mounted metal box and spotlight are MILES training attachments, not part of the gun system).

The Bushmaster project started as an offshoot of the US Army's MICV-65 program that was attempting to introduce a new infantry fighting vehicle to replace their existing M113 armored personnel carriers. Part of this program called for a new scout vehicle to replace the M114, a parallel development taking place under the XM800 Armored Reconnaissance Scout Vehicle. Both the XM800 and the cavalry version of the XM701 MICV vehicles were armed with the M139, a US-built version of the Hispano-Suiza HS.820 20 mm autocannon. During the testing phase, the Army eventually rejected the XM701 and started work on a newer design known as the XM723. Soon after the XM800 was also rejected. This led to the combination of the two programs, moving the scout role to the cavalry version of the XM723.

At the same time, the M139 proved to be disappointing and a contract for a new weapon to replace it started as a competitive development in 1972 simultaneously at Ford's Aeronutronic Division with the PFB-25 (self-powered weapon) and the Hughes Helicopters' Ordnance Division (externally-powered,) under the Summa Corporation as the Vehicle Rapid-Fire Weapons System-Successor, or VRFWS-S. This was essentially a power-driven gun firing similar 20 mm ammunition to the HS.820, the power-driven mechanism was to ensure operation even in the case of a misfire.

Progress on the VRFWS-S was slow, and eventually resulted in a switch to a much more powerful, 25 mm, round. Similar delays in the MICV program meant the ultimate vehicles descending from their efforts, the M2/M3 Bradley fighting vehicle, did not enter production until 1981, by which point the Bushmaster had matured. Since 1990, there have been several enhancements made upon the weapon, resulting in the enhanced 25 mm gun.

To date, more than 10,500 weapons are in service. One of the major reasons for this popularity is the extremely reliable nature of the weapon. It has a rating of 22,000 mean rounds between failure (MRBF), much higher than many comparable devices.

== Ammunition ==
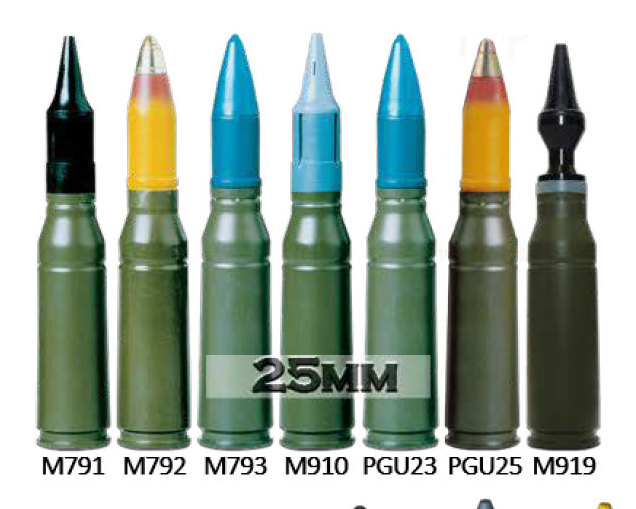

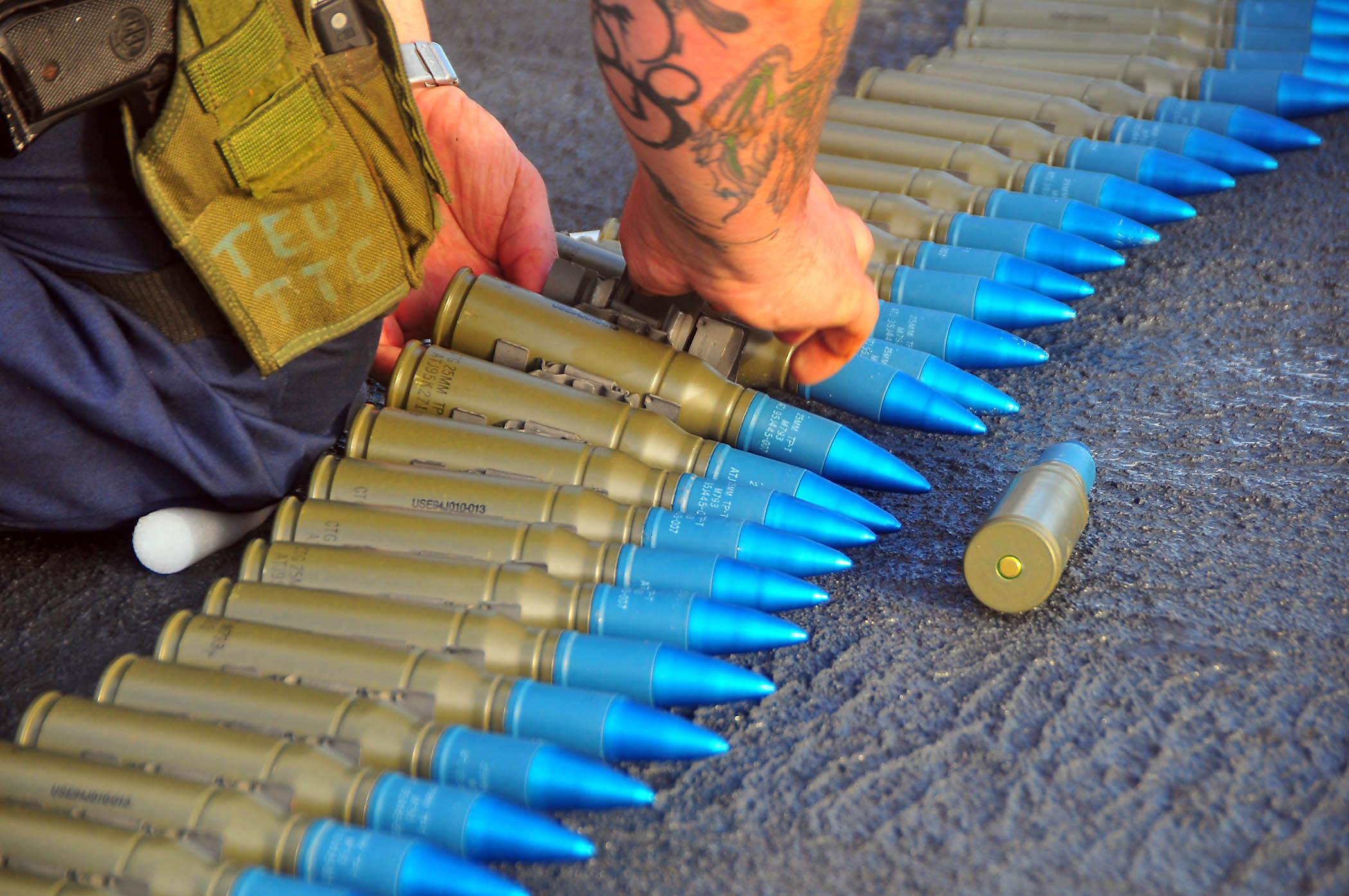
M793 target practice with tracer (TP-T) rounds for the MK-38 being inspected

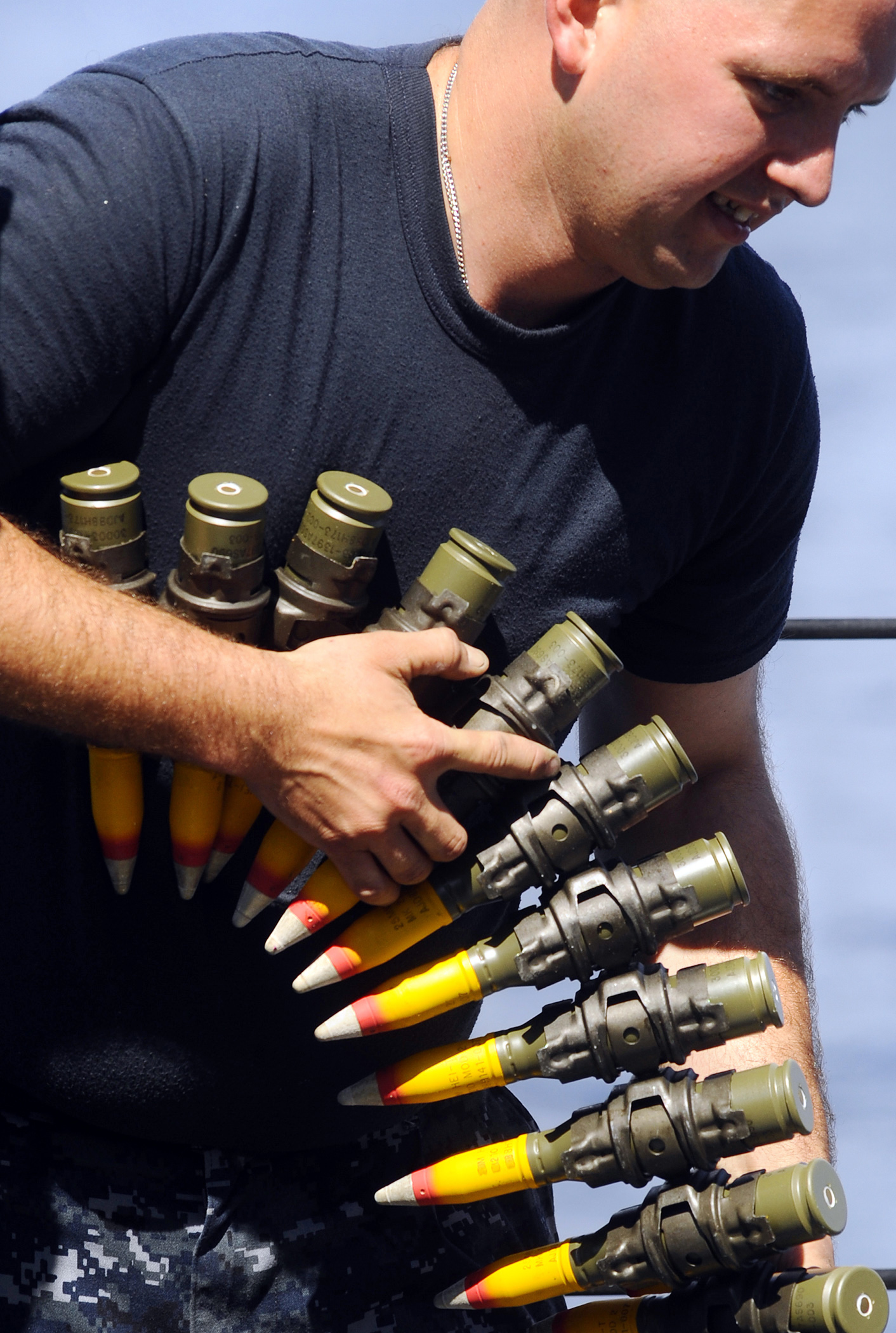
MK210 high explosive incendiary with tracer (HEI-T)

A wide range of ammunition has been developed for this weapon, providing it with the capability to defeat the majority of armored vehicles it is likely to encounter, up to and including some light tanks. The ammunition used in the M242 may also be used in a variety of weapons such as the GAU-12 Equalizer, the French Giat M811, or the Swiss Oerlikon KBA weapon system. It has the capability to fire U.S. manufactured ammunition as well as the NATO equivalents thereof. Primarily though, it fires six types of rounds: the M791, M792, M793, M910, MK210, and M919.

M791 armor-piercing discarding sabot with tracer
The APDS-T penetrates lightly armored vehicles, self-propelled artillery, and aerial targets such as helicopters and various slow-moving, fixed-wing aircraft. Reported velocity of 1,345 m/sec.
M792 high explosive incendiary with tracer and self destruct
The HEI-T can destroy unarmored vehicles and helicopters and suppress anti-tank missile positions and enemy squads out to a maximum effective range of 2,200 meters. Uses the M758 fuse, reported velocity of 1,100 m/sec.
M793 target practice with tracer
The TP-T cartridge is a fixed-type, percussion-primed training round that matches the high explosive incendiary with tracer (HEI-T M792) round ballistically. The TP-T's tracer is visible out to 2,000 meters, however, the round has a maximum effective range (accuracy-limited) of 1,600 meters. Reported velocity of 1,100 m/sec.
M910 target practice discarding sabot with tracer
The TPDS-T replicates the flight pattern of the M791 armor piercing discarding sabot with tracer (APDS-T) round. The TPDS-T allows units to realistically practice sabot engagements. Reported velocity of 1,515 m/sec.
MK210 high explosive incendiary with tracer
Used by the U.S. Navy in their Mk38 naval weapon system.
M919 armor-piercing, fin-stabilized discarding sabot with tracer.
The APFSDS-T round penetrates lightly armored vehicles, self-propelled artillery, and aerial targets, which include helicopters and slow-moving fixed-wing aircraft. The dart is made of depleted uranium.

== Variants ==
The M242 is currently in use by the United States Army, the United States Navy, the United States Marine Corps, the United States Coast Guard, the New Zealand Army, the Royal New Zealand Navy, the Norwegian Army, the Spanish Army, the Sri Lanka Navy, the Swiss Army, the Canadian Army, the Royal Canadian Navy, the Australian Army, the Royal Australian Navy, the Israeli Navy, the Philippine Navy, the Philippine Army, the Singapore Army, and the Republic of Singapore Navy as well as several others, including since 2023 the Armed Forces of Ukraine. The wide usage has resulted in several variations and modifications on the standard M242 weapon system.

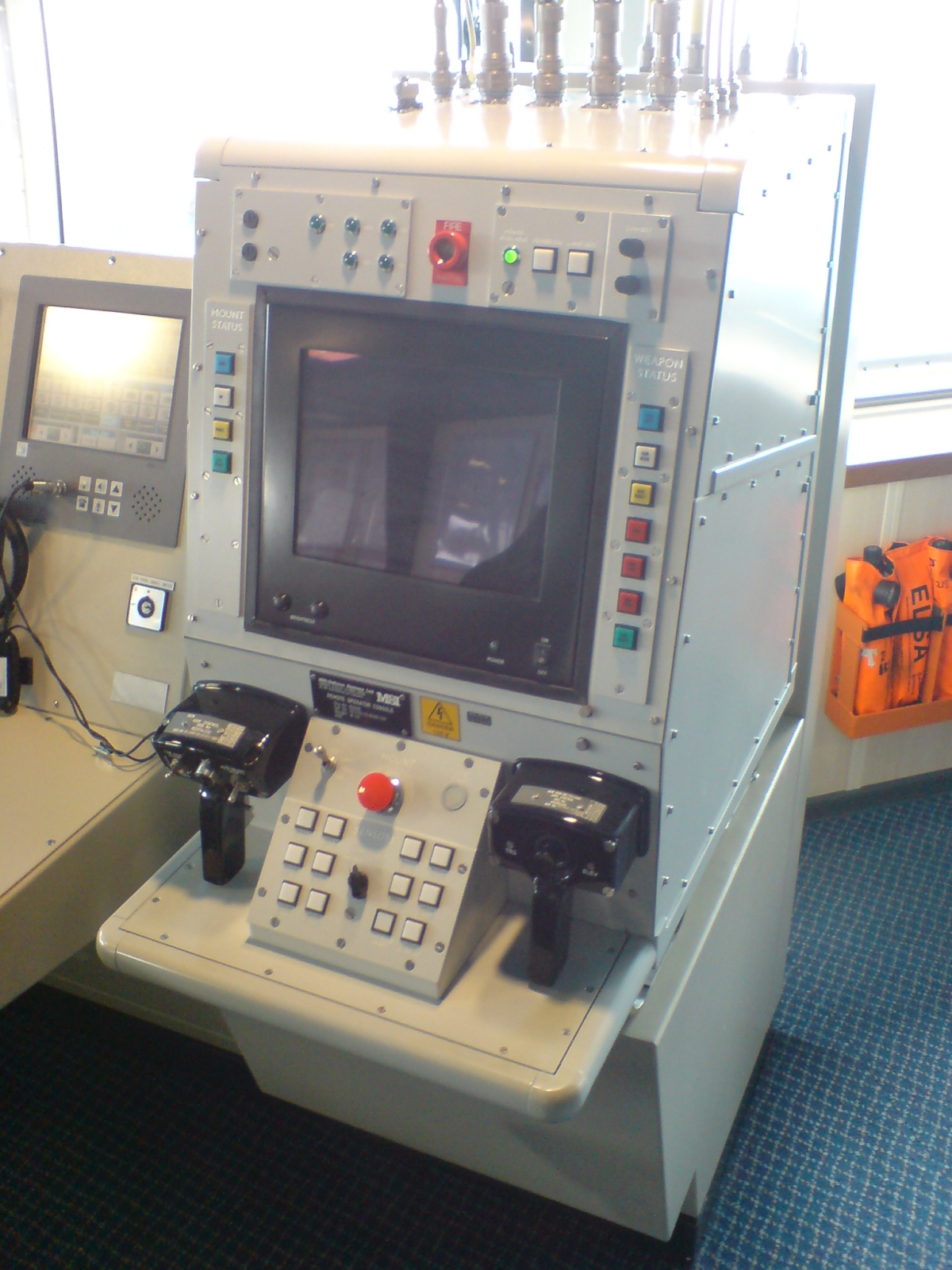
Weapons station for the remote controlled M242 on the multi-role vessel HMNZS Canterbury

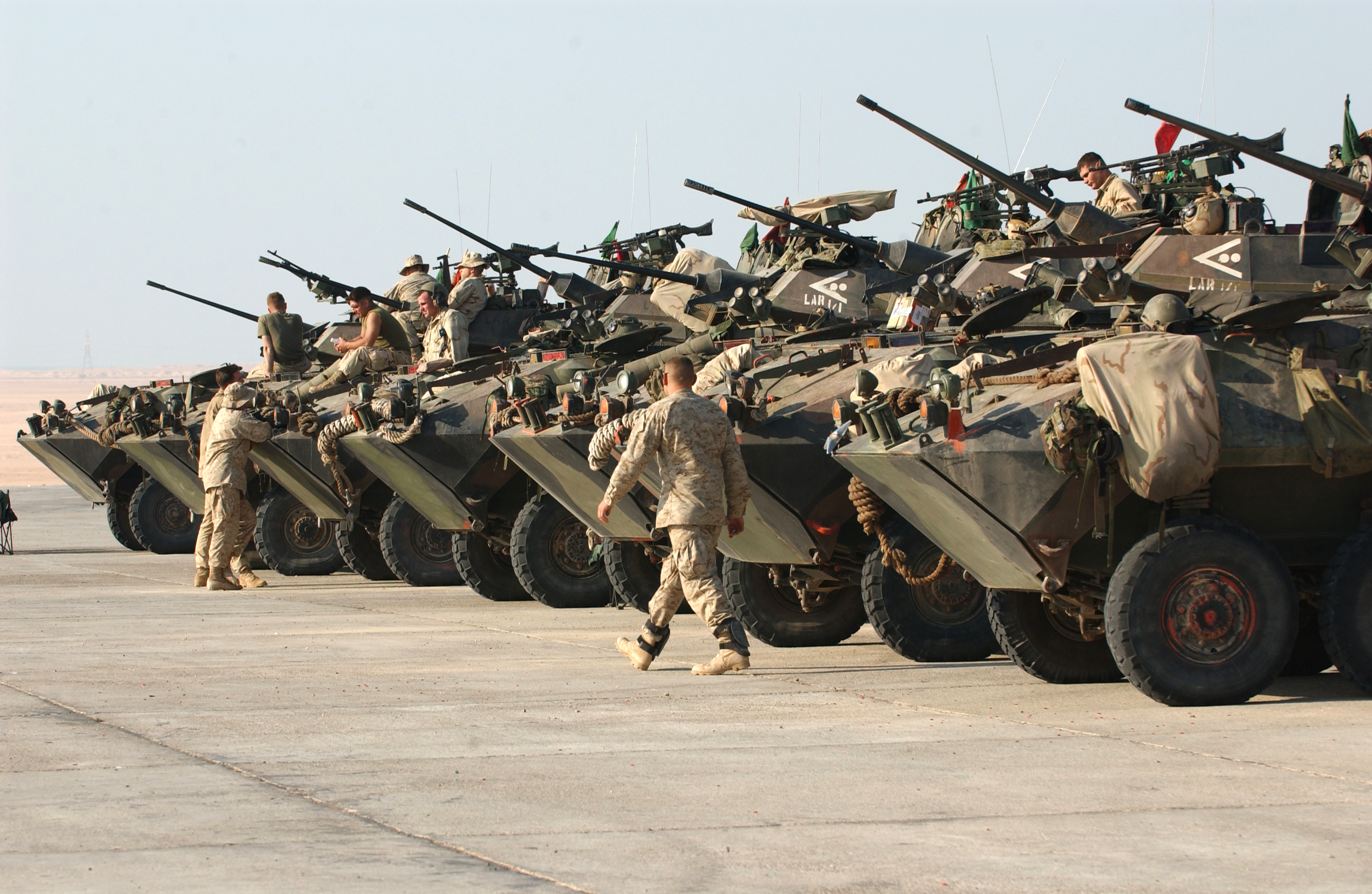
The United States Marine Corps' LAV-25.

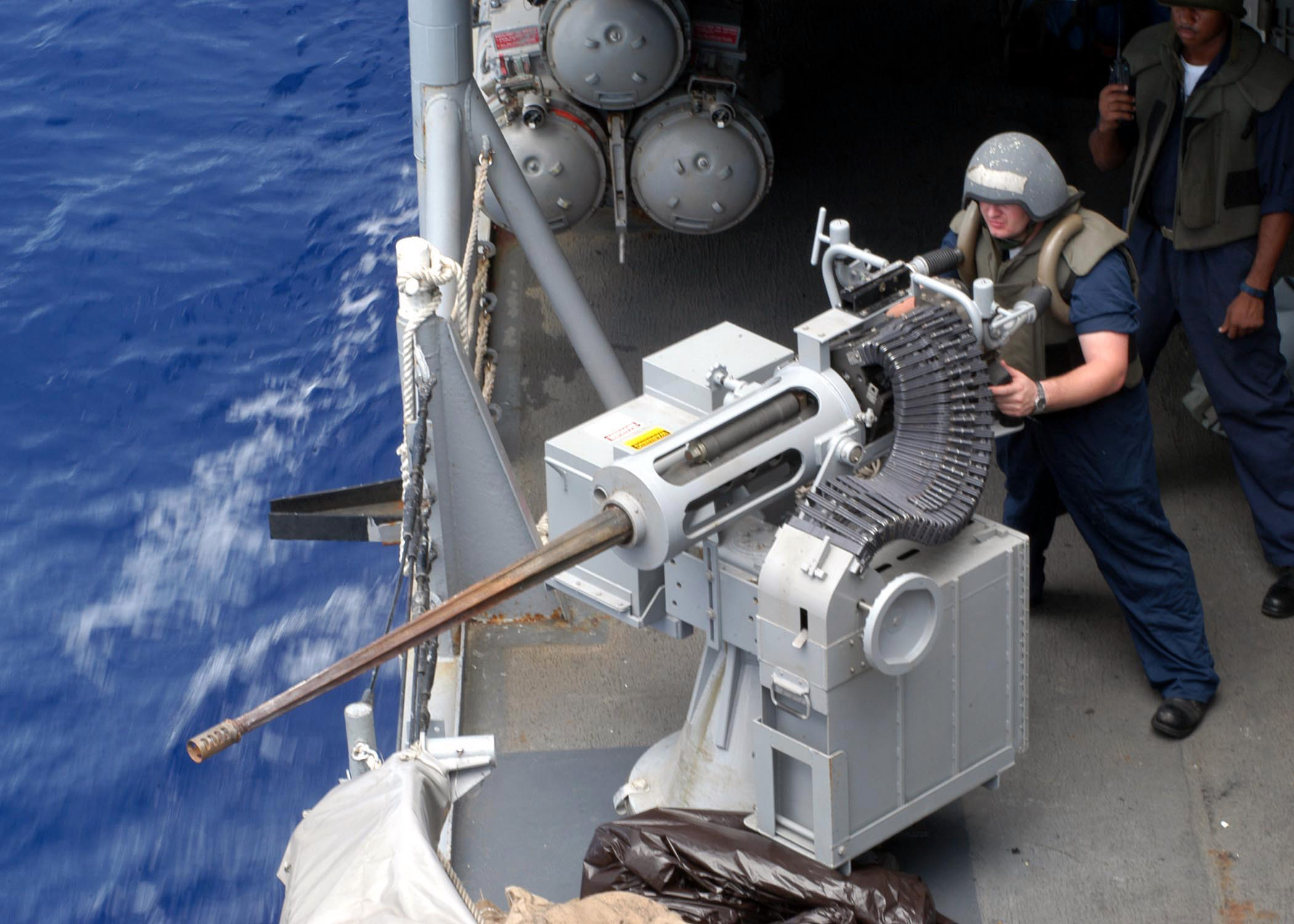
An Mk38. The M242 has a characteristic fluted gun barrel to reduce weight and assist cooling.

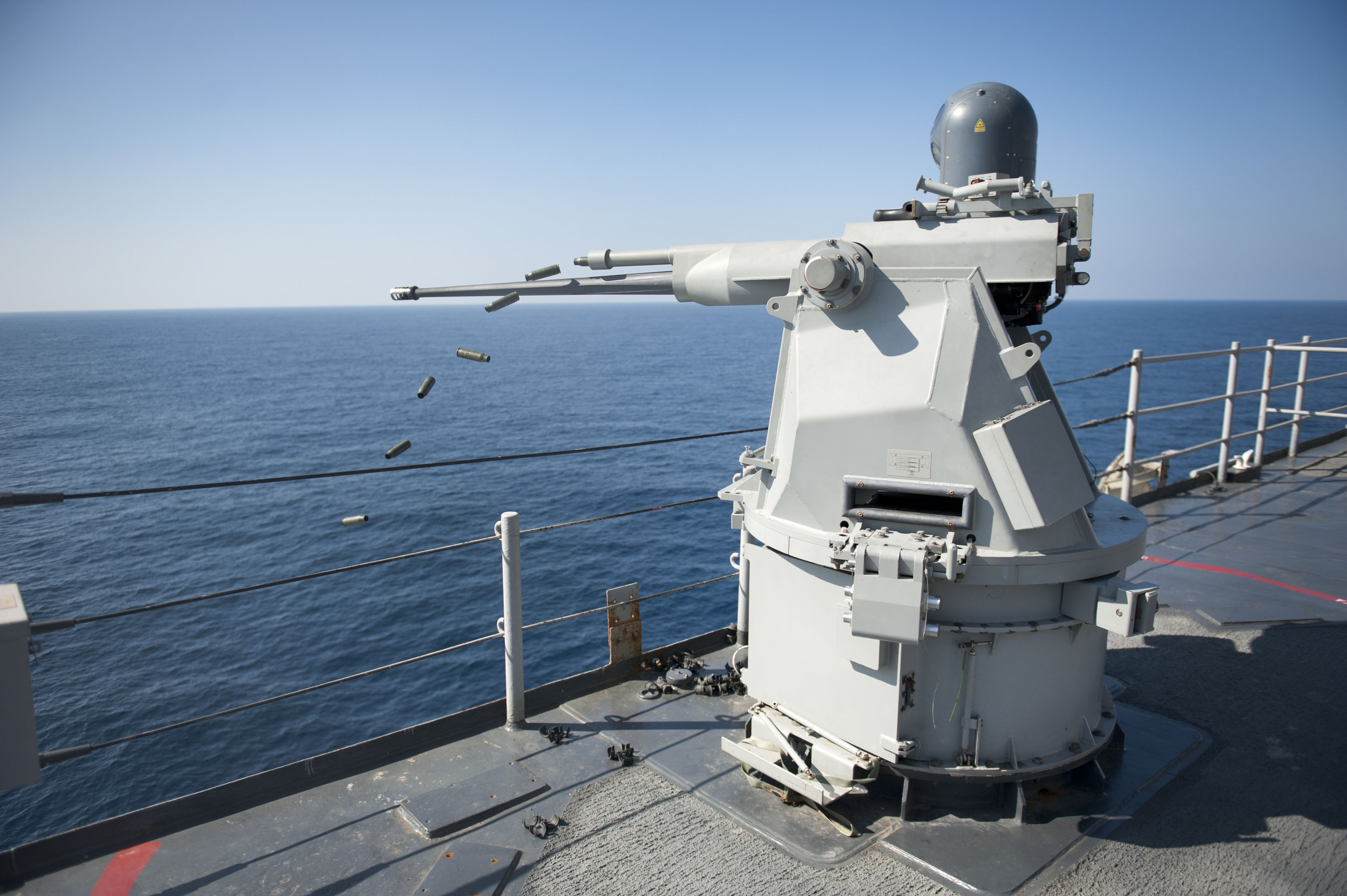
A Mk 38 MOD 2 25 mm autocannon gun system aboard the amphibious dock landing ship USS Pearl Harbor forward ejecting the spent casings.

=== Ground vehicles ===
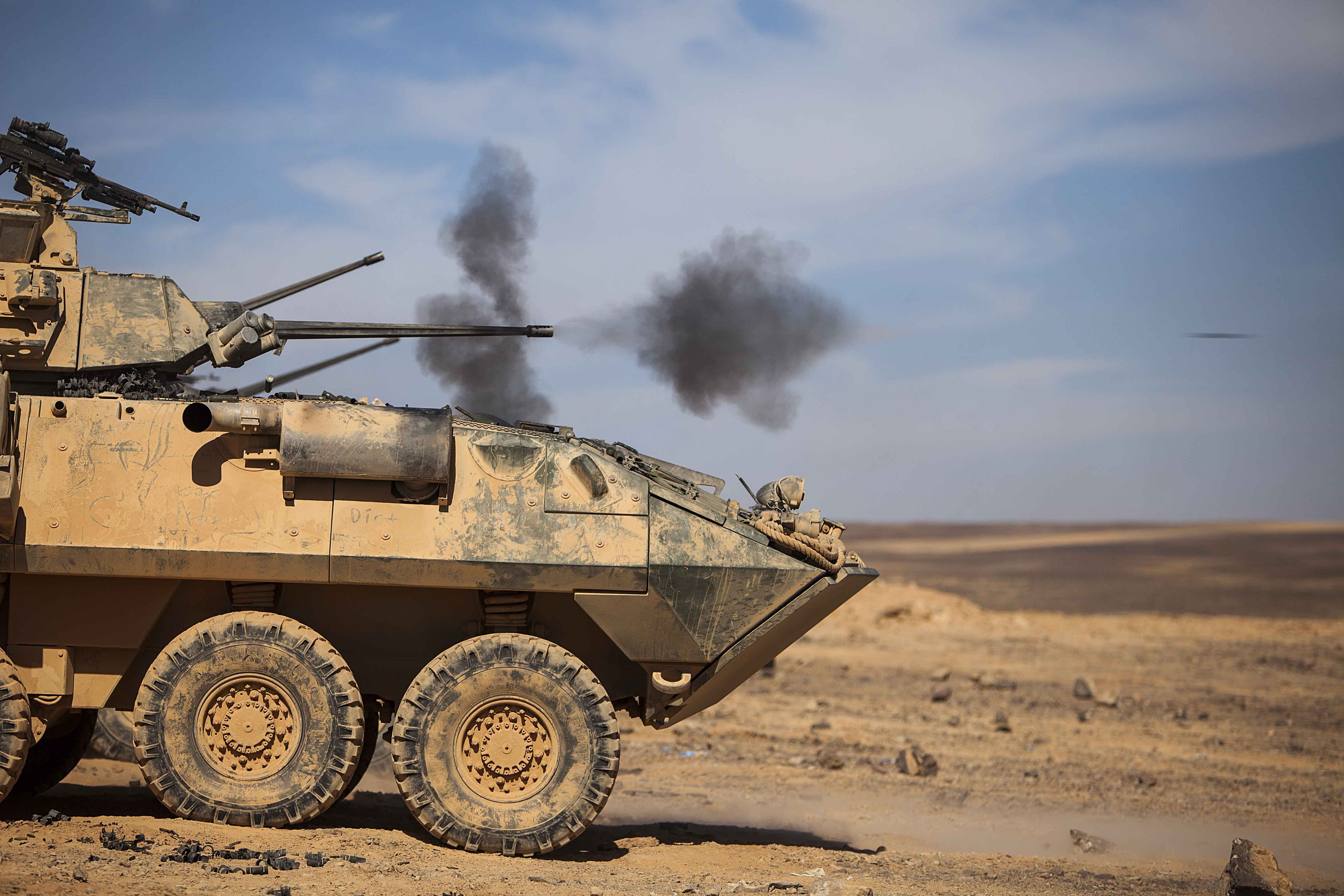
A U.S. Marine Corps LAV-25A2 firing its M242 Bushmaster during a live-fire exercise, c. 2014

The M242 is standard equipment on the U. S. Army M2 and M3 Bradley fighting vehicles; it is also in use on the LAV-25. Before the project was cancelled, the Mk44 Bushmaster II 30 mm chain gun (a successor to the M242) was used on the Marine Corps' Expeditionary Fighting Vehicle (EFV).

The M242 is also a popular choice of primary armament for armored fighting vehicles manufactured around the world, such as Singapore's Bionix AFVs and as the Rafael Overhead Weapon Station-25 mounted on upgraded M113A2 Ultra IFVs.

=== Enhanced 25 mm gun ===
Work on an upgraded weapon began in 1990. In the upgrade program, all three major systems and seven minor systems were improved. The modifications began with introducing a chrome-lined barrel, an enhanced feeder, and an enhanced receiver. The weapon systems also received minor upgrades such as quick-detachable link covers, a larger breech assembly, a high efficiency muzzle brake, longer recoil, an integral round counter, an extended life firing pin and spring, and a triple-spring drive clutch. Upgraded weapons were first put to use on the M2A3 Bradley, the fourth version of the M2 Bradley fighting vehicle.

=== Naval ===
In 1977, the U. S. Navy realized that it needed a replacement for the Oerlikon 20 mm Mk 16 series of guns. In 1986, this requirement was satisfied with the introduction of the Mk 38 Mod 0 weapons system. A derivative of the M242 system, the Mk 38 consists of the M242 chain gun and the Mk 88 Mod 0 machine gun mount. It provides ships with defensive and offensive gunfire capability for the engagement of a variety of surface targets. Designed primarily as a close-range defensive measure, it provides protection against patrol boats, floating mines, and various shore-based targets.

==== Mk 38 Mod 2 and Mod 3 ====
Recently, several US Navy platforms have been outfitted with a newer version, the Typhoon Weapon System designated Mk 38 Mod 2, which is remotely operated and includes an electronic optical sight, laser range-finder, FLIR, and a more reliable feeding system, enhancing the weapon system's capabilities and accuracy. In 2006 the Sri Lanka Navy added the M242 to its fleet of fast attack craft.

The system is also in use by the Republic of Singapore Navy's Formidable-class frigates and Endurance-class landing platform dock ships and were deployed as part of coalition forces' port security efforts in Iraq as well as anti-piracy roles in the Gulf of Aden. Aside from that, the Singapore Police Coast Guard's new coastal patrol craft (NCPC) has adopted the system as its main armament.

The Mod 3 updates electronics and adds a coaxial 7.62 mm machine gun with a 570-round-per-minute rate of fire.

==== Aselsan STOP ====
The Turkish-made Aselsan STOP stabilized weapon station can be fitted with an M242 Bushmaster.

BAE and Boeing teamed together after a March 2011 contract to add a directed energy weapon to the Mk 38 Mod 2 gun mount, known as the Mk 38 Mod 2 tactical laser system. The TLS combines a Boeing-designed solid-state laser with the existing BAE-manufactured Mk 38 mount to deliver high-precision accuracy against fast surface and air threats including speed boats and unmanned aerial vehicles (UAVs). Laser power levels can be adjusted depending on the target and mission objectives. Originally, the system was armed with a 10 kW laser, but in April 2017 BAE announced they had increased power to 60 kW.

==== Proposed upgrades ====
In April 2012, BAE unveiled a potential version of the system mount, developed in collaboration with Israel's Rafael Advanced Defense Systems. It is visually distinctive from previous versions with its stealthy housing, which also protects the gun from weather and allows for easier access to internal components through large access panels. The upgrade mounts a larger Alliant Techsystems Mk44 Bushmaster II 30 mm cannon for a 500-meter range increase, as well as a coaxial .50 caliber M2 heavy machine gun. Elevation is increased to +75 degrees for engaging UAVs and helicopters, and ammunition storage is greater at 420 30 mm rounds. Other features include a larger manual fire control panel, an offset mode specifically for firing warning shots, and a surveillance mode where the gun can be pointed away from a target but the EO sensor remains pointed in the target direction. Although it has a high degree of commonality and has the same footprint as previous models, the upgrade is 20 percent heavier due to the greater ammo load.

== Operators ==
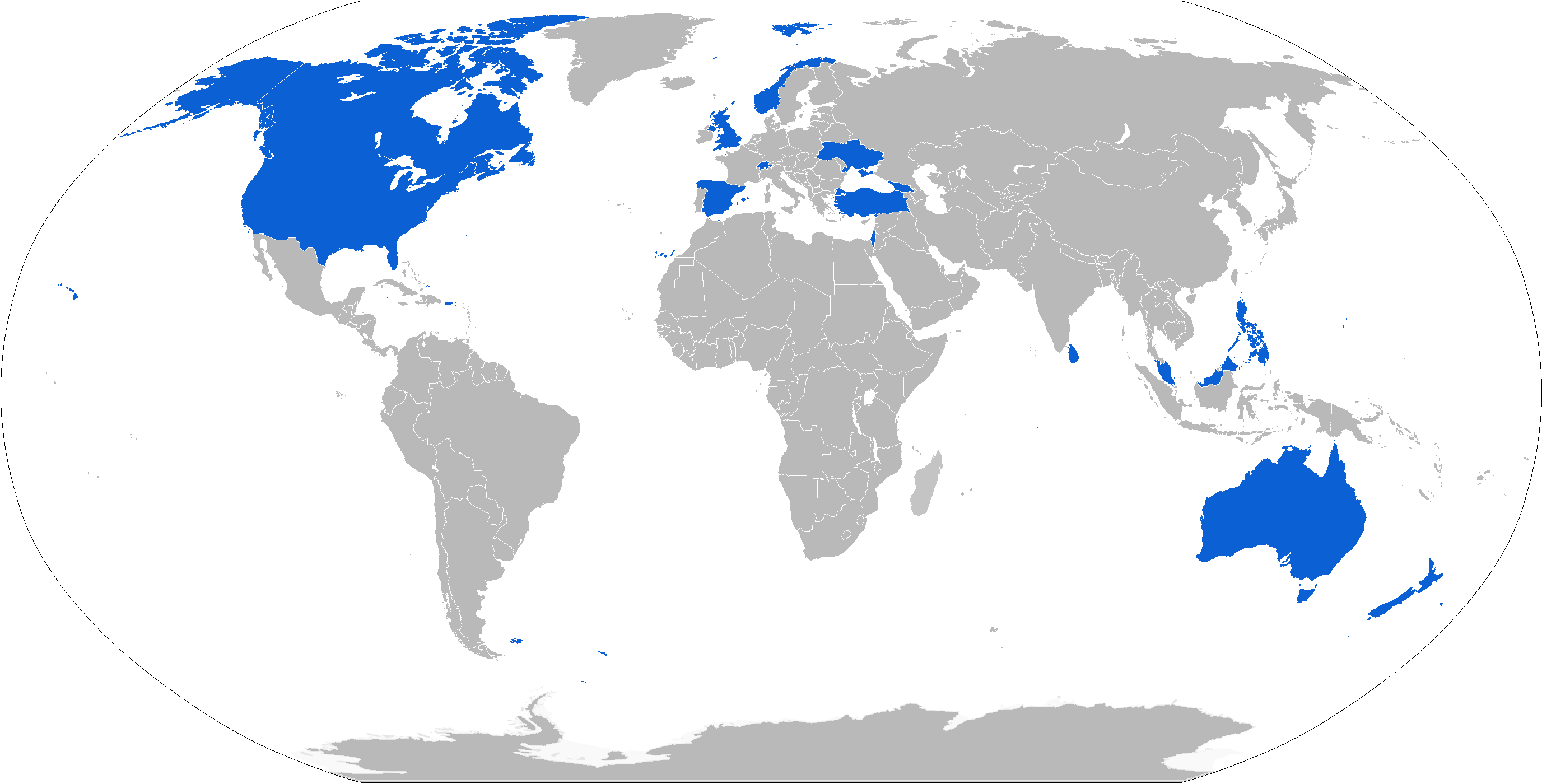
Map with M242 operators in blue

- Australia
  - Army: ASLAV-25
  - Navy: Armidale-class patrol boats, Hobart-class destroyers, Canberra-class landing helicopter docks
- Canada
  - Army: Coyote reconnaissance vehicle, LAV VI APC
  - Navy: Harry DeWolf-class offshore patrol vessel
- Croatia
  - Army: M2 Bradley
- Georgia
  - Coast Guard: Island-class patrol boat
- Israel
  - Navy: Super Dvora Mk III-class patrol boat, Shaldag-class fast patrol boat
- Malaysia
  - Army: ACV-300 IFV
- New Zealand
  - Army: NZLAV
  - Navy: HMNZS Canterbury multi-role vessel and Protector-class offshore patrol vessels
- Norway
- Philippines
  - Army: GKN Simba AIFV, M113 APC
  - Navy: Del Pilar-class offshore patrol vessel, Jacinto-class patrol vessel, Mariano Alvarez-class coastal patrol vessel, and Jose Andrada-class patrol craft
- Singapore
  - Army: Bionix 25 (replaced by the 30 mm Bushmaster II on the Bionix II), M113A2 Ultra IFV
  - Navy: Endurance-class landing platform dock, Formidable-class frigate
  - Police Coast Guard: New coastal patrol craft (NCPC)
- Spain
  - Army: VEC-M1
  - Navy: Meteoro-class offshore patrol vessel
- Sri Lanka
  - Navy: Hamilton-class cutter, Reliance-class cutter
- Switzerland
- Turkey
- Ukraine
  - Army: Bradley M2A2 ODS & M7 Bradley fire support vehicle,LAV VI
  - Ukrainian Navy: Island-class patrol boat (2019)
- United States
  - Army: M2/M3 Bradley
  - Navy (Mk. 38 Mod 0, Mk. 38 Mod 2 and Mk. 38 Mod 3): Nimitz-class aircraft carrier, Arleigh Burke-class destroyer, Ticonderoga-class cruiser, Oliver Hazard Perry-class frigate, Wasp-class amphibious assault ship, Tarawa-class amphibious assault ship, Whidbey Island-class dock landing ship, Harpers Ferry-class dock landing ship, Austin-class amphibious transport dock, Blue Ridge-class command ship, Cyclone-class patrol ship, Mark VI patrol boat
  - Marine Corps: LAV-25
  - Coast Guard (Mk. 38 Mod 0, Mk. 38 Mod 2 and Mk. 38 Mod 3): Reliance-class cutter, Hamilton-class cutter, Sentinel-class cutter, Island-class cutter, USCGC Alex Haley, future Heritage-class cutter

== See also ==
- 30mm DS30M Mark 2 Automated Small Calibre Gun British automated mount with 30 mm Bushmaster II
- Bushmaster III 35/50 mm chain gun
- Bushmaster IV 40 mm chain gun
- List of crew-served weapons of the U.S. Armed Forces
- List of weapons of the United States Marine Corps
- M230 30 mm automatic cannon
- Mark 38 25 mm Machine Gun System
- Bushmaster II 30 mm chain gun
- Oerlikon KBA 25 mm automatic cannon
- Shipunov 2A42 30mm automatic cannon
