= VENOM LR 30 mm gun =

VENOM LR cannon
- Type: Revolver cannon for RCWS
- Place of origin: United Kingdom

Production history
- Designer: AEI Systems
- Manufacturer: AEI Systems (UK); Canik Arms (Turkey) (both are subsidiaries of the Turkish company Samsun Yurt Savunma Group)
- Produced: 2019–present

Specifications
- Mass: 122 kg (269 lb)
- Length: 2,044 mm (6 ft 8.5 in)
- Barrel length: 1,400 mm (4 ft 7 in)
- Width: 315 mm (1 ft 0.4 in)
- Height: 310 mm (1 ft 0 in)
- Shell: 30×113mm
- Calibre: 30 mm (1.2 in)
- Action: Gas operated, electrically primed, self-loading revolver weapon
- Rate of fire: Single shot, 220-230 rpm (spm firing mode), 1200 rpm
- Muzzle velocity: 765–830 m/s (2,510–2,720 ft/s)
- Effective firing range: 2,000 m (1.2 mi)
- Maximum firing range: 3,000 m (1.9 mi)

The VENOM LR is a rotary autocannon derived from the ADEN 30 mm gun, although most of its components and working principle are different. The LR stands for low recoil. It is designed to be fired from remote controlled weapon stations (RCWS) that can mount 12.7 mm machine guns.

== Description ==
The VENOM LR is designed for RCWS integration where reduced recoil forces permit installation onto light reconnaissance vehicles and fast patrol vessels. The guns' recoil mitigation system is based on the same principles as applied to the aircraft mounted ADEN cannon. Recoil force has been reduced from around the 22 kilo Newtons (kN) of the standard VENOM 30 to about 7 kN (9 kN maximum). The company claimed that it is up to 50% cheaper than the Orbital ATK M230LF, thus making it a highly competitively priced, and non-ITAR (International Traffic in Arms Regulations), alternative to the M230. The cannon is able to use AP (Armour Piercing) ammunitions, AP-T (Armour Piercing - Tracer), HEDP (High Explosive Dual Purpose), HEI (High Explosive Incendiary), HEI-T (High Explosive Incendiary - Tracer), and both standard and tracer training ammunition. The VENOM LR is designed for both land and naval use, with its naval version having some minor changes. The cannon has been tested on the Midgard 300 RCWS built by Valhalla Turrets and the Electro Optic Systems R400S MK.2 Single RCWS.

== Users ==
Bangladesh

- Bangladesh Navy

== See also ==
- VENOM 30 mm gun – lighter cannon built by the same company but with higher recoil
- GIAT 30 - comparable French design, also at 113mm long, & the longer 150mm
- DEFA cannon - comparable older French design, also at 113mm long
- ADEN cannon – older comparable British design, shorter at 111mm
- Oerlikon KCA - comparable Swiss design but much longer at 173mm
- Mauser BK-27 – comparable German design, 27×145mm
- R-23 cannon – comparable Russian design, 23×260mm (telescoped)
- M39 cannon – comparable older US design, 20×102mm
