= Rheinmetall RMK30 =

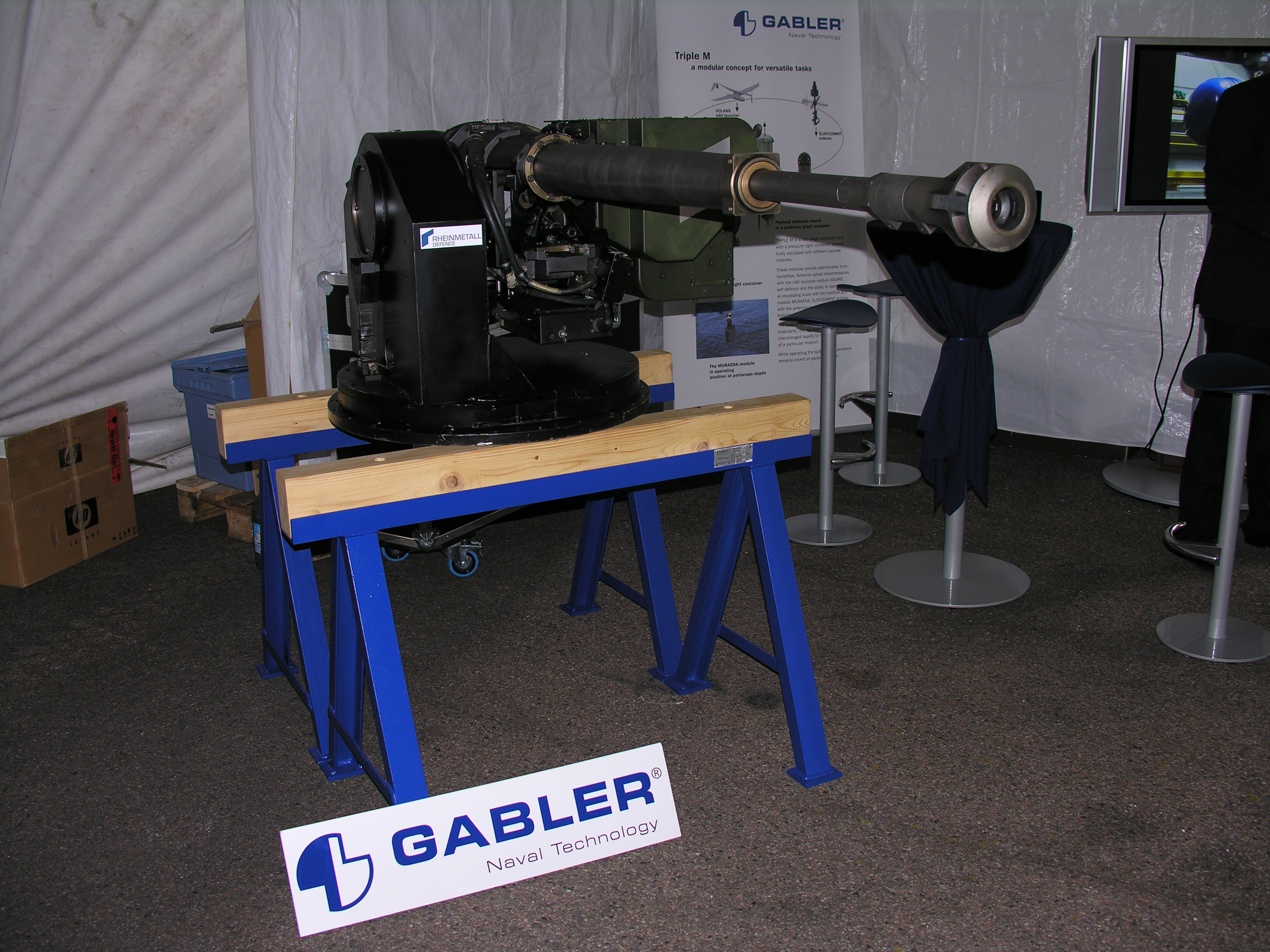
- Rheinmetall RMK30 (TechDemo 2008 exhibition)
- Type: Autocannon
- Place of origin: Germany

Production history
- Produced: 1997

Specifications
- Mass: 100 kg (220.5 lb)
- Length: 2,340 mm (92.1 in)
- Barrel length: 1,700 mm (66.9 in)
- Shell: 30 × 250 mm caseless
- Barrels: 1
- Action: three-chamber revolver cannon
- Rate of fire: 300 rpm

The RMK 30 (Rückstoßfreie Maschinenkanone 30; recoilless autocannon) is a recoilless 30 mm caliber autocannon firing caseless 30 × 250 mm ammunition cartridges. The gun was developed by the German company Mauser, which is now a subsidiary of the Rheinmetall group.

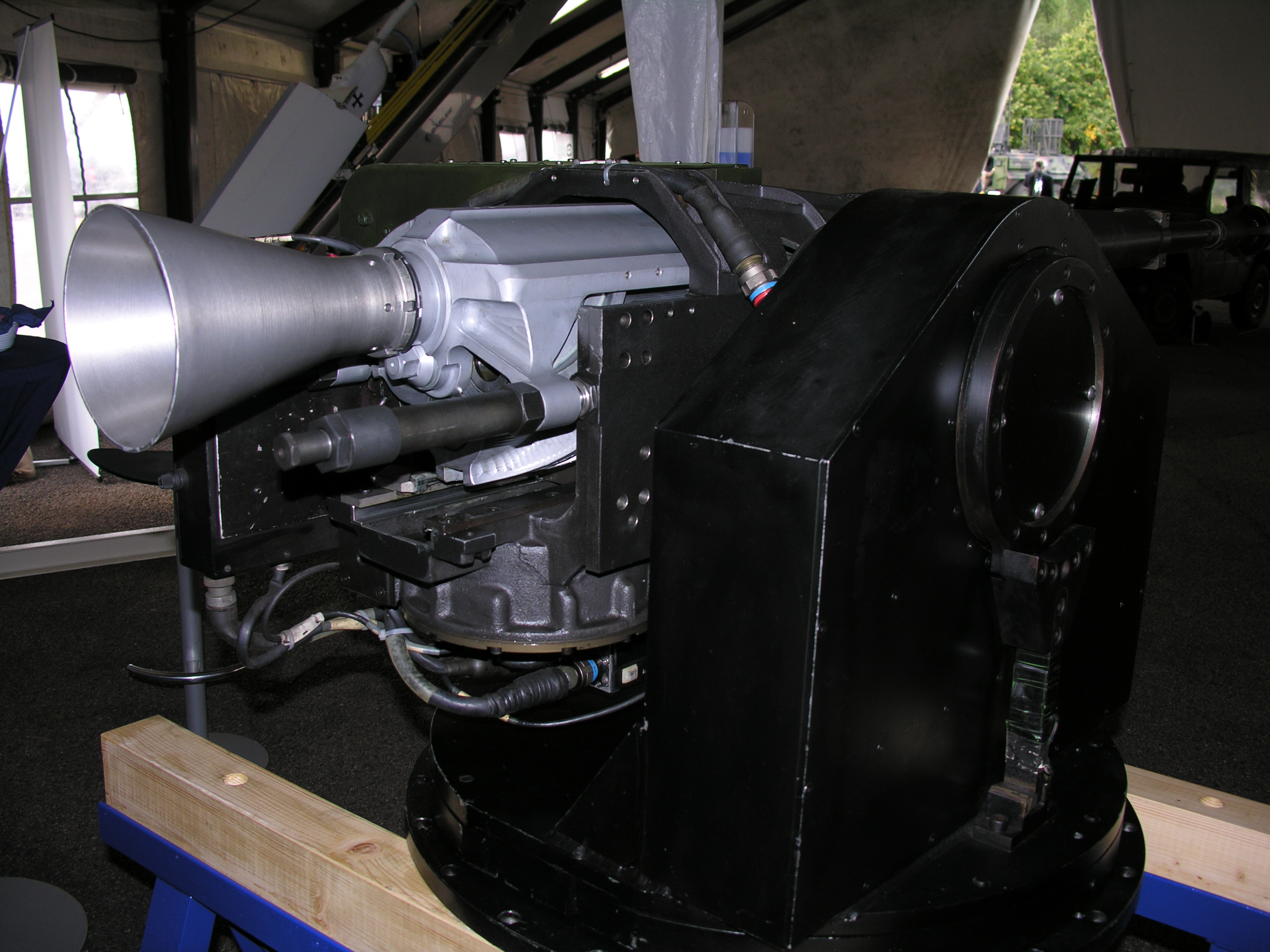
Back view of Rheinmetall RMK30 (TechDemo 2008)

The German Bundesamt für Wehrtechnik und Beschaffung (BWB) required a new recoilless autocannon, therefore the development of the RMK 30 started in 1993. Unlike former recoilless weapons it is capable of firing salvos or in fully automatic mode without producing recoil. It is a three-chamber revolver cannon; the revolver and firing mechanism are driven by an electric motor, allowing variable rates of fire of up to 300 rounds/min. A fraction of the propellant gases is ejected to the rear of the cannon, compensating for the recoil and allowing lightweight and less rigid mounts.

Though recoilless, the RMK 30 has a higher muzzle energy than conventional 30 mm autocannons.

RMK 30 cannons have been proposed as upgrade for the Bundeswehr's (German armed forces) Tiger UHT attack helicopters. The UHT version currently lacks a gun, since the German Army was not happy with the recoil, accuracy and the range of the French GIAT 30 mm cannon which is fitted to other Tiger versions.

In 1996 it was tested mounted on a Wiesel AWC.

An unusual study (Project MORAINE) suggests mounting an RMK 30 gun in a retractable mast on a Type 212 submarine. Such masts would extend the capabilities of submarines, which currently lack appropriate means to fight small surface targets or just give warning shots. This study has directly led to the Muraena concept.

== Gallery ==
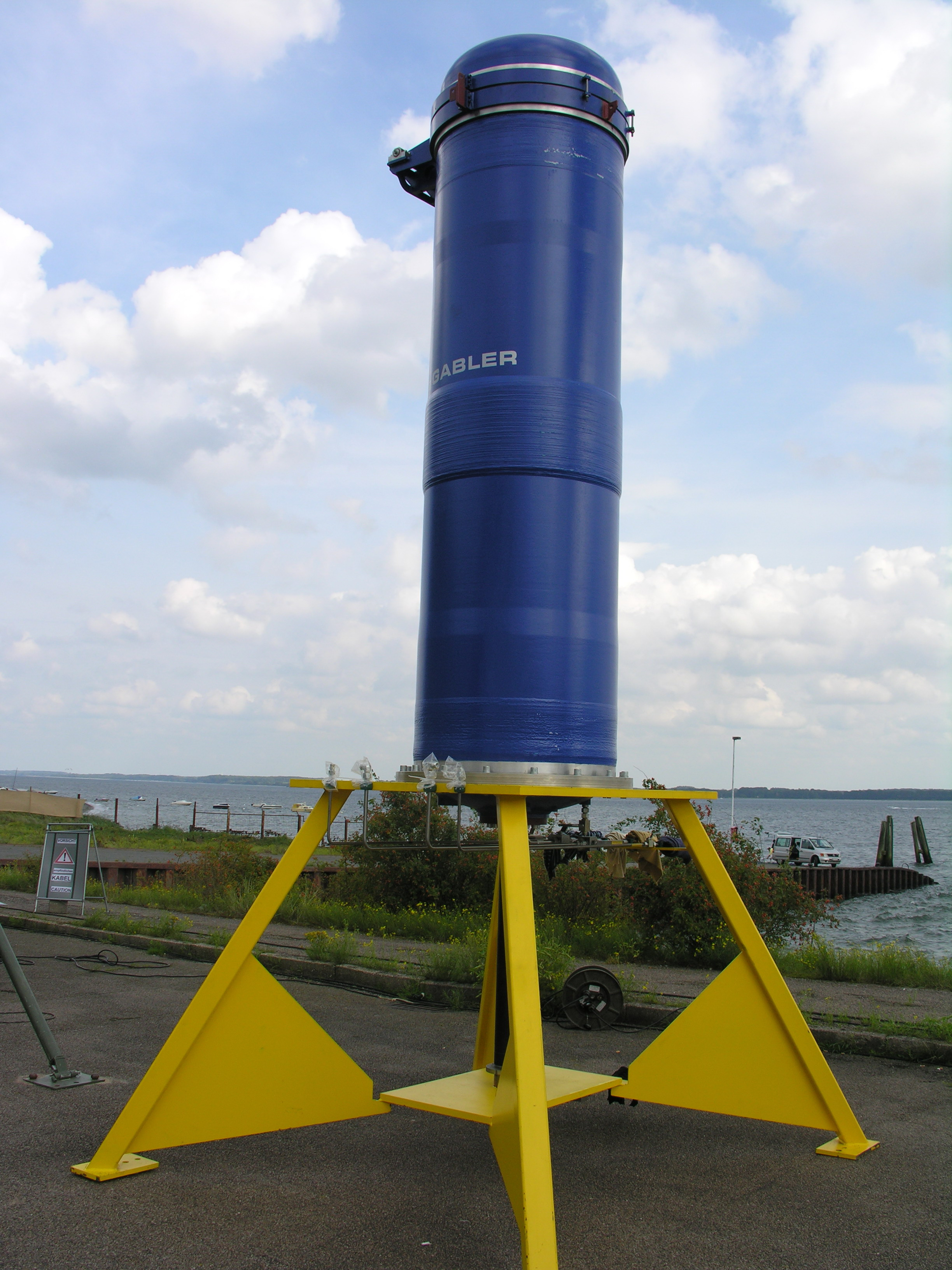
MURAENA mast for RMK30 (Project MORAINE) on TechDemo 2008
