= ADEN cannon =

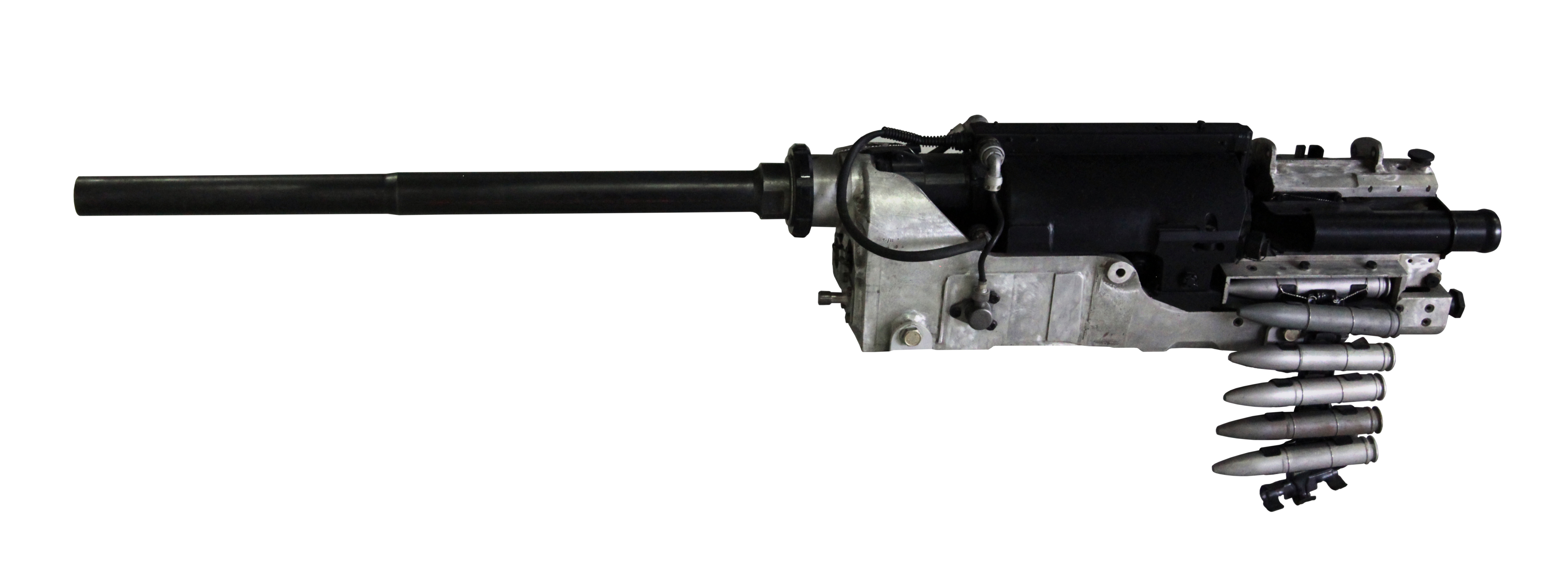
- 30 mm ADEN Mk 4 on display at the Imperial War Museum Duxford
- Type: Revolver cannon
- Place of origin: United Kingdom

Service history
- Used by: See users

Production history
- Designer: Armament Development Establishment
- Designed: 1946
- Manufacturer: Royal Small Arms Factory
- Produced: 1953–present

Specifications
- Mass: 196 kg (432 lb) with 200 rounds
- Length: 1,590–1,639 mm (5 ft 2.6 in – 5 ft 4.5 in)
- Barrel length: 1,080 mm (3 ft 7 in)
- Shell: 30×113mm belted
- Calibre: 30 mm (1.2 in)
- Action: gas operated revolver
- Rate of fire: 1,200–1,700 rpm
- Muzzle velocity: 795 m/s (2,610 ft/s)

The Royal Small Arms Factory ADEN cannon (ADEN being an acronym for "Armament Development, Enfield") is a 30 mm revolver cannon used on many military aircraft, particularly those of the British Royal Air Force and Fleet Air Arm. Developed post-World War II primarily to meet British Air Ministry's requirement for increased lethality in aircraft armament, the cannon is fired electrically, and is fully automatic once loaded.

== Design and development ==
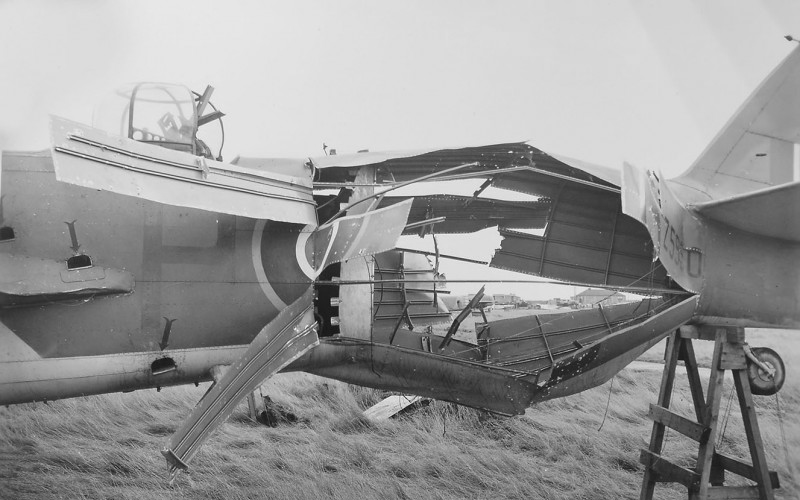
British testing of German 30 mm mine shell on a Bristol Blenheim. Single shot test.

During World War II, the German firm Mauser began development of a radically new 20 mm autocannon using a motorised firing mechanism in order to improve the rate of fire. The weapon was designed for 20mm mine shell rounds (designated the Mauser MG 213 and for 30mm rounds (the Mauser MK 213). However, production of the MK 213 never commenced due to development problems such as excessive barrel wear and to the Allied Combined Bomber Offensive campaign against German industry. At the end of the war only 5 prototypes (V1 to V5) of either 20 mm MG 213 or 30 mm MK 213 had been finished.

In the post-war era, the MK 213 became well-known in armament circles, and a number of companies took up development. This included the Armament Development Establishment in the UK and GIAT in France. A common 30×111mm round was developed that offered a dramatic improvement in muzzle velocity from the MK 108's 500 m/s to the new design's 790 m/s (2,600 ft/s). This was only slightly lower than contemporary 20 mm cannon like the Hispano Mk. V's 840 m/s (2,800 ft/s), making the new round suitable for use during dogfights as well as against larger, slower-manoeuvring targets. The mechanism improved the rate of fire significantly, from the Mk. V's 750 rpm to 1,300 rpm. The new weapon was quickly developed, and production was set up at the Royal Small Arms Factory in Enfield. The name ADEN was created by combining the two first initials of Armament Development Establishment with the first two letters of Enfield, producing ADEN. The ADEN cannon entered service on the British Hawker Hunter in 1954, and was subsequently used on every British gun-armed aircraft until the advent of the Panavia Tornado in the 1980s. The last version produced was the Mk. 4. An improved version, the Mk. 5, incorporates a multitude of small changes to improve reliability and increase rate of fire to 1,500–1,700 rounds per minute. No new Mk 5s were built, but many older weapons were converted and redesignated "Mk 5 Straden".

GIAT also introduced their version of the design as the DEFA cannon; the two weapons are very similar.

=== ADEN 25 ===
The ADEN Mk 5 became the basis for the planned ADEN 25, which was to be a somewhat larger 203 pounds (92.1 kg) weapon 90 in (2.3 m) long, firing the new range of 25×137mm NATO STANAG 4173 ammunition (as developed for M242 Bushmaster) at a much higher muzzle velocity of 3,445 feet per second (1,050 m/s). The lighter ammunition was also to produce a higher rate of fire, 1,650 to 1,850 rounds per minute.

The ADEN 25 was selected for British Harrier GR.5 aircraft. After initial weight problems and persistent difficulties in integrating the cannon with the pod, and the pod with the aircraft, the MoD considered the cost of fixing the problems excessive, and the project was cancelled in 1999. The Harrier GR.7 was cleared for emergency use of the ADEN 25, no attempt apparently having been made to retrofit the older ADEN 30 mm pods. Fleet Air Arm Sea Harriers retained the 30 mm weapon until their retirement in 2006.

== Aircraft use ==
=== Built-in armament ===
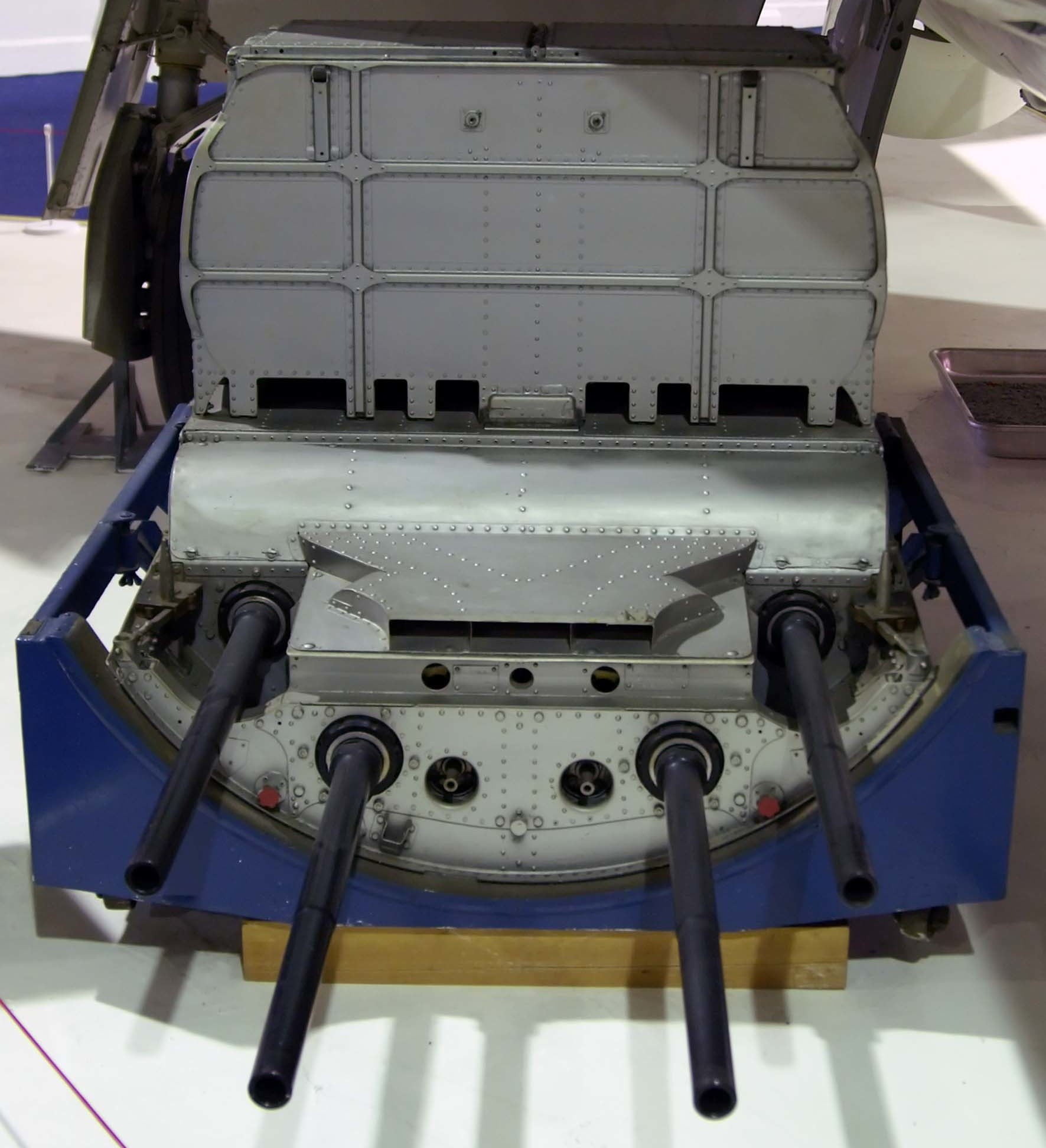
A quad 30 mm ADEN cannon pack removed from a Hawker Hunter

- CAC Sabre
- English Electric Lightning
- Folland Gnat
- Gloster Javelin
- HAL Ajeet
- HAL Marut
- Hawker Hunter
- Saab Draken
- Saab Lansen
- SEPECAT Jaguar
- ST Aerospace A-4S Skyhawk
- Supermarine Scimitar
- Supermarine Swift

=== As external armament ===
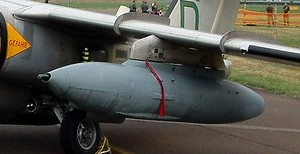
FFV 30 mm ADEN gun pod fitted to a Saab 105Ö

The ADEN gun has seen use in several gun pods including:

- British Hawker Siddeley Harrier and BAE Sea Harrier, as well as the US Marine Corps AV-8A/Cs, carried two 30 mm ADEN gun pods below the fuselage of the aircraft.
- The FFV 30 mm and Matra SA-10 gunpods produced for Swedish Air Force by collaboration with FFV and S. A. Engins Matra used on Saab AJ 37 and Saab Sk 60B/C attack aircraft during the early 1970s used guns taken from scrapped Swedish Saab J 32Bs and Hawker Hunter J 34s. The FFV pod has also been sold to the Austrian Air Force for use on their Saab 105Ös.
- A centreline gun pod containing ADEN gun and 100 rounds on the BAE Systems Hawk in RAF service. It is still in service with, among others, the South African Air Force.

== Specifications ==
The Aden is belt-fed using a disintegrating belt of open-type links.

- Type: Single-barrel aircraft autocannon
- Action: Revolver drum with 5 chambers
- Operation: Gas operation
- Cocking-system: Pneumatic
- Priming: Electronic firing
- Firing-system: Electrical 26 volts DC
- Rifling: Progressive RH parabolic twist, 16 grooves
- Cartridge: 30 × 113 mm
- Calibre: 30 mm (1.18 in)
- Weight of complete weapon: 87.1 kg (192 lb), 196 kg (432 lb) with 200 rounds
- Length of complete weapon: 1,590–1,639 mm (5 ft 2.6 in – 5 ft 4.5 in)
- Weight of barrel: 12.25 kg (27.0 lb)
- Length of barrel: 1,080 mm (3 ft 6.5 in)
- Recoil load: 31.4 kN
- Rate of fire: 1,200–1,500 rpm (ADEN Mk. 4), 1,500–1,700 rpm (ADEN Mk.5)

=== Ammunition ===
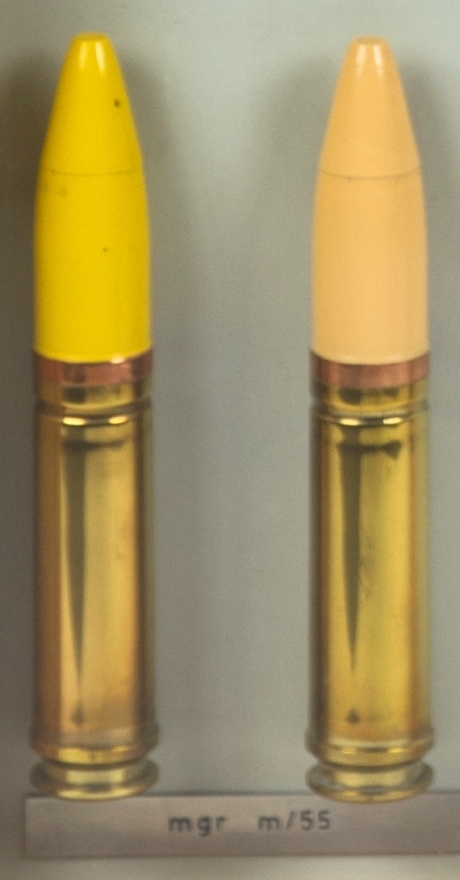
Swedish 30 mm High Explosive Mk.3Z 30 mm mgr m/55 (Note: Full designation: 30 mm skarp patron m/55 mingranat m/55. Swedish production is painted yellow and British production is painted buff.)

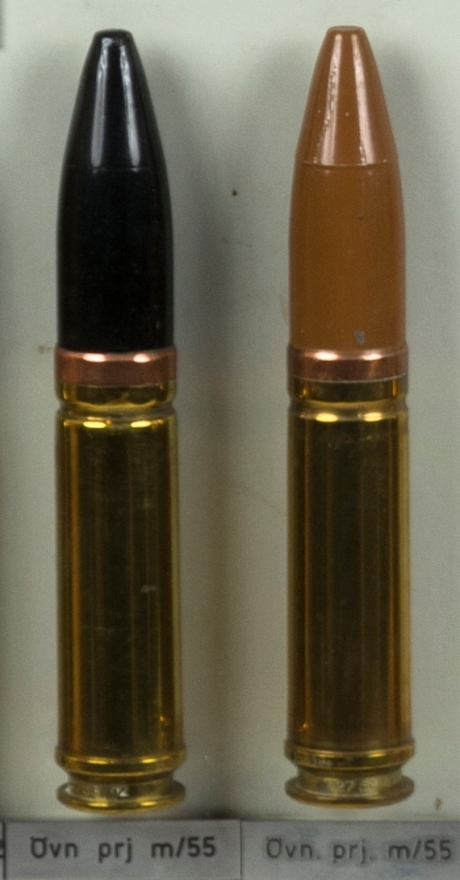
Swedish 30 mm Practice Mk.2Z 30 mm övnprj m/55 (Note: Full designation: 30 mm skarp patron m/55 övningsprojektil m/55. Early production is painted black and later production is painted brown.)

Ammunition for the ADEN included.

High Explosive (High Explosive Mk.3Z (Note: Full designation: "Cartridge, 30mm, Aden gun, High Explosive Mk. 3Z"))

- Projectile type: "High-Explosive, High-Capacity"
- Fuze type: Nose fuze
- Explosive filling: 52.5 g (1.85 oz) Torpex 5 (Hexotonal)
- Cartridge weight: 440 g (15.5 oz)
- Projectile weight: 220 g (7.76 oz)
- Propellant weight: 46 g (1.62 oz)
- CU-pressure: 2930 bar
- Muzzle velocity: 795 m/s (2,610 ft/s)

Armour-piercing (30 mm pprj m/55 (Note: Full designation: 30 mm skarp patron m/55 pansarprojektil m/55) Sweden)

- Projectile type: Armour-Piercing, Composite Rigid
- Fuze type: None
- Core type: Tungsten penetrator
- Cartridge weight: 511 g (18.0 oz)
- Projectile weight: 270 g (9.52 oz)
- Core weight: 150 g (5.29 oz)
- Propellant weight: 47 g (1.66 oz)
- CU-pressure: 2930 bar
- Muzzle velocity: 795 m/s (2,610 ft/s)

Target practice (Practice Mk.2Z (Note: Full designation: "Cartridge, 30mm, Aden gun, Practice Mk. 2Z"), UK )

- Projectile type: Inert solid metal plug in place of fuze and explosive charge
- Cartridge weight: 440 g (15.5 oz)
- Projectile weight: 220 g (7.76 oz)
- Core weight: 80.5 g (2.84 oz)
- Propellant weight: 46 g (1.62 oz)
- CU-pressure: 2930 bar
- Muzzle velocity: 795 m/s (2,610 ft/s)

== Users ==
Australia

- Royal Australian Air Force

Bahrain

- Royal Bahraini Air Force

Belgium

- Belgian Air Component

Chile

- Chilean Air Force

Denmark

- Danish Air Force

Finland

- Finnish Air Force

Iraq

- Iraqi Air Force

India

- Indian Air Force
- Indian Naval Air Arm

Indonesia

- Indonesian Air Force (TNI-AU)

Jordan

- Royal Jordanian Air Force

Kenya

- Kenyan Air Force

Kuwait

- Kuwait Air Force

Lebanon

- Lebanese Air Force

Netherlands

- Royal Netherlands Air Force

Malaysia

- Royal Malaysian Air Force

Oman

- Royal Air Force of Oman

Peru

- Peruvian Air Force

Qatar

- Qatar Emiri Air Force

Rhodesia (now Zimbabwe)

- Royal Rhodesian Air Force (later to Air Force of Zimbabwe)

Saudi Arabia

- Royal Saudi Air Force

Singapore

- Republic of Singapore Air Force

South Africa

- South African Air Force

Republic of Korea

- Republic of Korea Air Force

Somalia

- Somali Air Corps

Spain

- Spanish Naval Air Arm

Sweden

- Swedish Air Force – designated 30 mm akan m/55

Switzerland

- Swiss Air Force

Thailand

- Royal Thai Navy Flying Unit

United Arab Emirates

- United Arab Emirates Air Force

United Kingdom

- Fleet Air Arm
- Royal Air Force

== See also ==
- VENOM LR 30 mm – British 21st century derivative of ADEN, 113mm long variant
- DEFA cannon – comparable French design, 113mm long
- GIAT 30 - comparable French design, 113mm & 150mm long
- Oerlikon KCA - comparable Swiss design, 173mm long
- VENOM 30 mm – British 173mm long variant
- Mauser BK-27 – comparable German design, 27mm diameter
- R-23 cannon – comparable Russian design, 23mm
- M39 cannon – comparable US design, 20mm diameter
