= GIAT 30 =

GIAT 30M 791
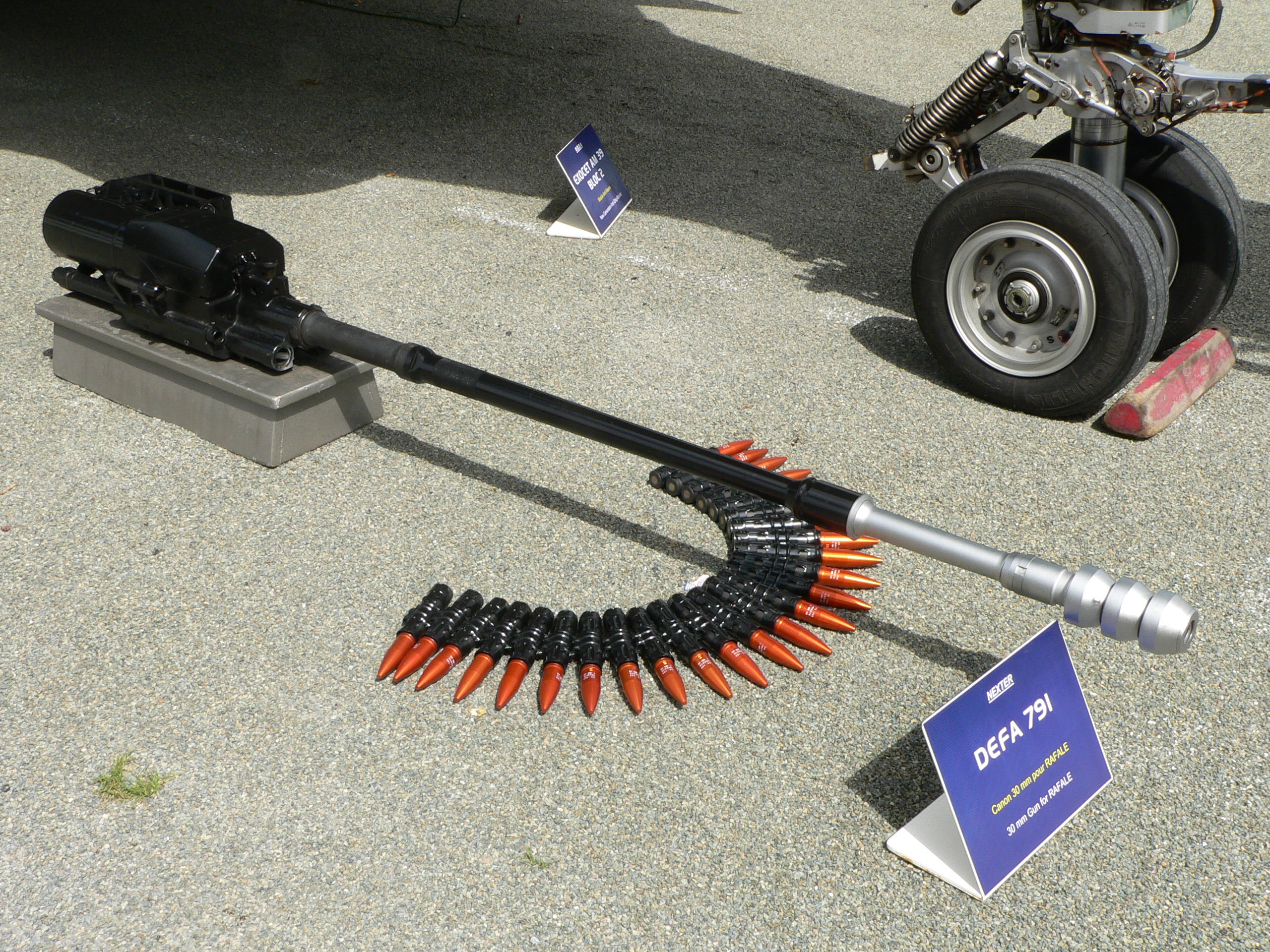
- GIAT 30M 791 cannon for the Dassault Rafale fighter
- Type: Revolver cannon
- Place of origin: France

Service history
- In service: 1980s-present
- Used by: France

Specifications
- Mass: M 791: 120 kg (260 lb); M 781:65 kg (143 lb)
- Length: M 791: 2.4 m (7 ft 10 in); M 781:1.875 m (6 ft 1.8 in)
- Width: 290 mm (11 in)
- Height: 240 mm (9.4 in)
- Shell: M 791: 30×150mm B M 781: 30×113mm B
- Barrels: 1
- Action: Seven-chamber revolver
- Rate of fire: M 791: variable anti-aircraft mode 1500 or 2500 rounds/min or grounding mode 300 or 600 rpm M 781: 750 rounds/min
- Muzzle velocity: 1,025 m/s (3,360 ft/s)

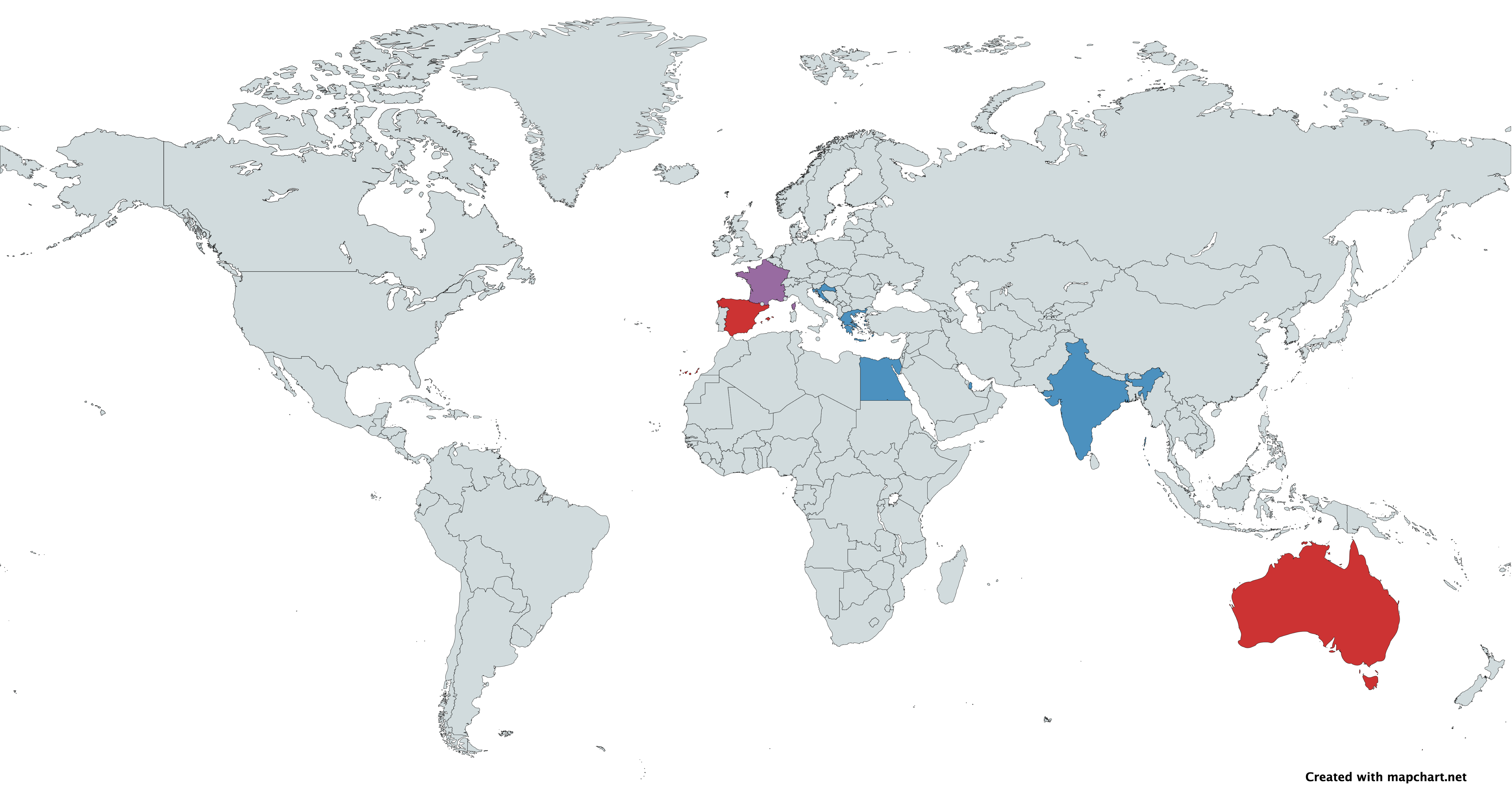
Map with GIAT 30 users. Users of only the 30M 791 are in blue, users of only the 30M 781 are in red, and users of both are in purple.

The GIAT 30 is a series of 30 mm cannon developed to replace the DEFA 550 series weapons on French military aircraft.

Introduced in the late 1980s, the GIAT 30 is a revolver cannon with electric ignition and automatic recocking. Unlike the DEFA cannon, the revolver chamber is electrically operated, rather than gas operated, improving both reliability and rate of fire.

Two versions of the GIAT 30 are offered.

== GIAT 30M 781 ==
Primarily intended for helicopter use and offered in several fixed, podded, and turreted installations. It is 1.87 m (6 ft 2 in) long with a total system weight of 65 kg (143 lb). It is designed to fire the ADEN/DEFA 30×113mm B rounds. The weight of the projectile varies from 244 g (8.6 oz) for HEI to 270 g (9.5 oz) for APHEI-SD. Typical muzzle velocity is 810 m/s (2,700 ft/s) with a rate of fire of 750 rounds per minute.

Given its considerable recoil, it is typically used for single shots or controlled bursts rather than continuous fire. The 30 M781 is used on the Eurocopter Tiger and is also offered for naval use as part of the NARWHAL (NAval Remote Weapon High Accuracy and Light) system.

Ammunition: HEI; SAPHEI; APHEI-SD; API-T; TP.

== GIAT 30M 791 ==
Intended for fighter aircraft such as the Dassault Rafale. It uses a new range of 30×150mm B ammunition in a variety of types. It has a muzzle velocity of 1,025 m/s (3,360 ft/s), which amounts to a muzzle energy of more than 127 kJ (94,000 ft⋅lbf) from the mass of the projectile alone (not taking into account explosive chemical energy). A variable rate of fire allows cyclic rates of 300, 600, 1500, or 2500 rounds per minute. It can fire continuous bursts or controlled 0.5 or 1 second bursts.

== Military operators ==
=== Current operators ===
==== Eurocopter Tiger ====
Operators of the Tiger equipped with the GIAT 30M781:

- Australia
- France
- Spain

==== Rafale ====
Operators of the Rafale equipped with the GIAT 30M791:

- Croatia
- Egypt
- France
- Greece
- India
- Qatar

=== Future operators ===
==== Rafale ====
- Indonesia
- Serbia
- United Arab Emirates

== See also ==
- VENOM LR 30 mm – British 21st century derivative of ADEN, 113mm long variant
- Oerlikon KCA - comparable Swiss design, 173mm long
- VENOM 30 mm – British 173mm long variant
- DEFA cannon – comparable older French design, 113mm long
- ADEN cannon – comparable older British design, 111mm
- Mauser BK-27 – comparable German design, 27×145mm
- R-23 cannon – comparable Russian design, 23×260mm (telescoped)
- M39 cannon – comparable older US design, 20×102mm
