= DEFA cannon =

French-made aircraft weapon

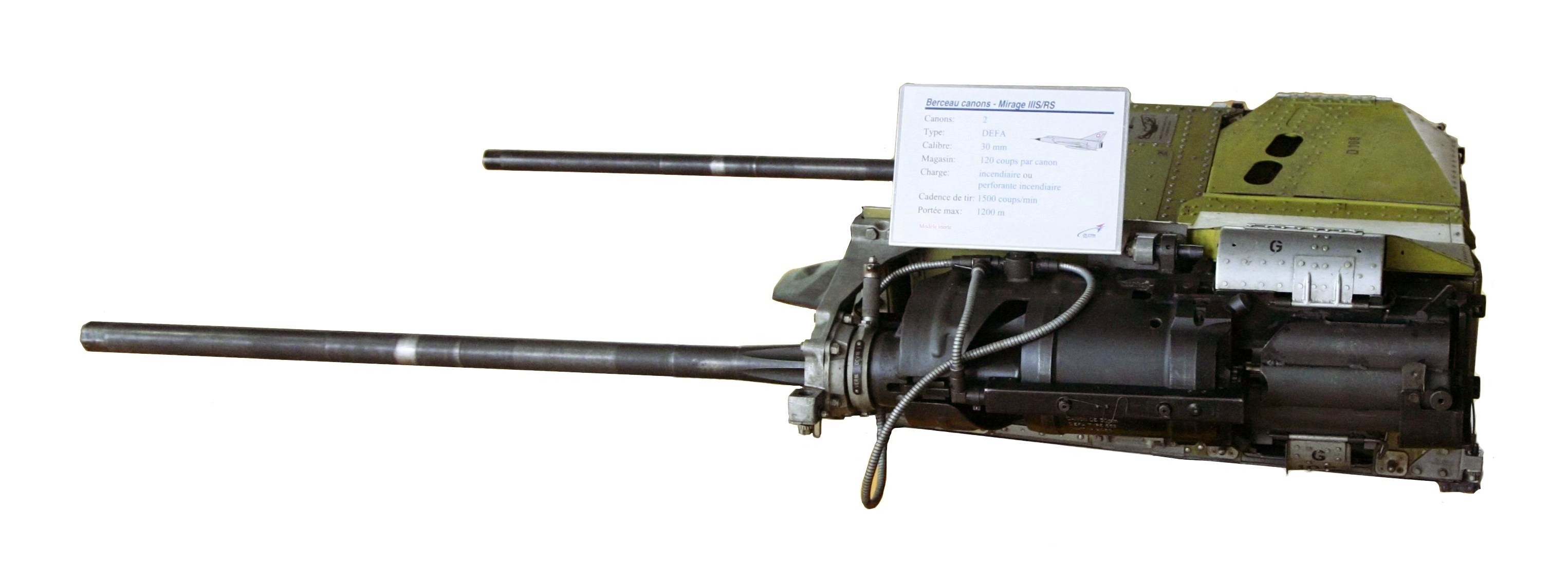
- DEFA cannon in a Mirage III twin mount
- Type: Revolver cannon
- Place of origin: France

Service history
- In service: 1954–present
- Used by: France, Switzerland, Israel, Italy, South Africa and others.

Production history
- Designer: DEFA
- Designed: Late 1940s
- Manufacturer: CASA, Dassault Aviation, Matra, AEi Systems.
- Produced: 1954

Specifications
- Mass: 552: 80 kg (180 lb); 553: 83 kg (183 lb); 554: 85 kg (187 lb)
- Length: 552: 1.66 m (5 ft 5 in); 553: 1.86 m (6 ft 1 in); 554: 2.01 m (6 ft 7 in)
- Barrel length: 552: 1.4 m (4 ft 7 in)
- Shell: 30 × 113 mm
- Calibre: 30 mm (1.2 in)
- Action: Five-chamber revolver
- Rate of fire: 552: 1,100-1,500 rpm 553: 1,300 rpm 554: 1,100 rpm (low) or 1,800 rpm (high)
- Muzzle velocity: 765–815 m/s (2,510–2,670 ft/s)

The DEFA cannon (Direction des Études et Fabrications d'Armement) is a family of widely used French-made aircraft revolver cannon firing 30 mm caliber NATO standard rounds.

== Design history ==
The initial DEFA 551 was developed in the late 1940s. It is based on the German Mauser MG 213C, an experimental revolver cannon developed for the Luftwaffe. The MG 213 never reached production, but inspired the DEFA, the very similar British ADEN cannon, and the smaller American M39 cannon. As the DEFA 552 it entered production in 1954. In 1968 an upgraded version, Canon 550-F3, was developed, entering production in 1971 as the DEFA 553. The new version provided a new feed system, nichrome plated steel barrel, forged drum casing, and improved electrical reliability.

== Overview ==
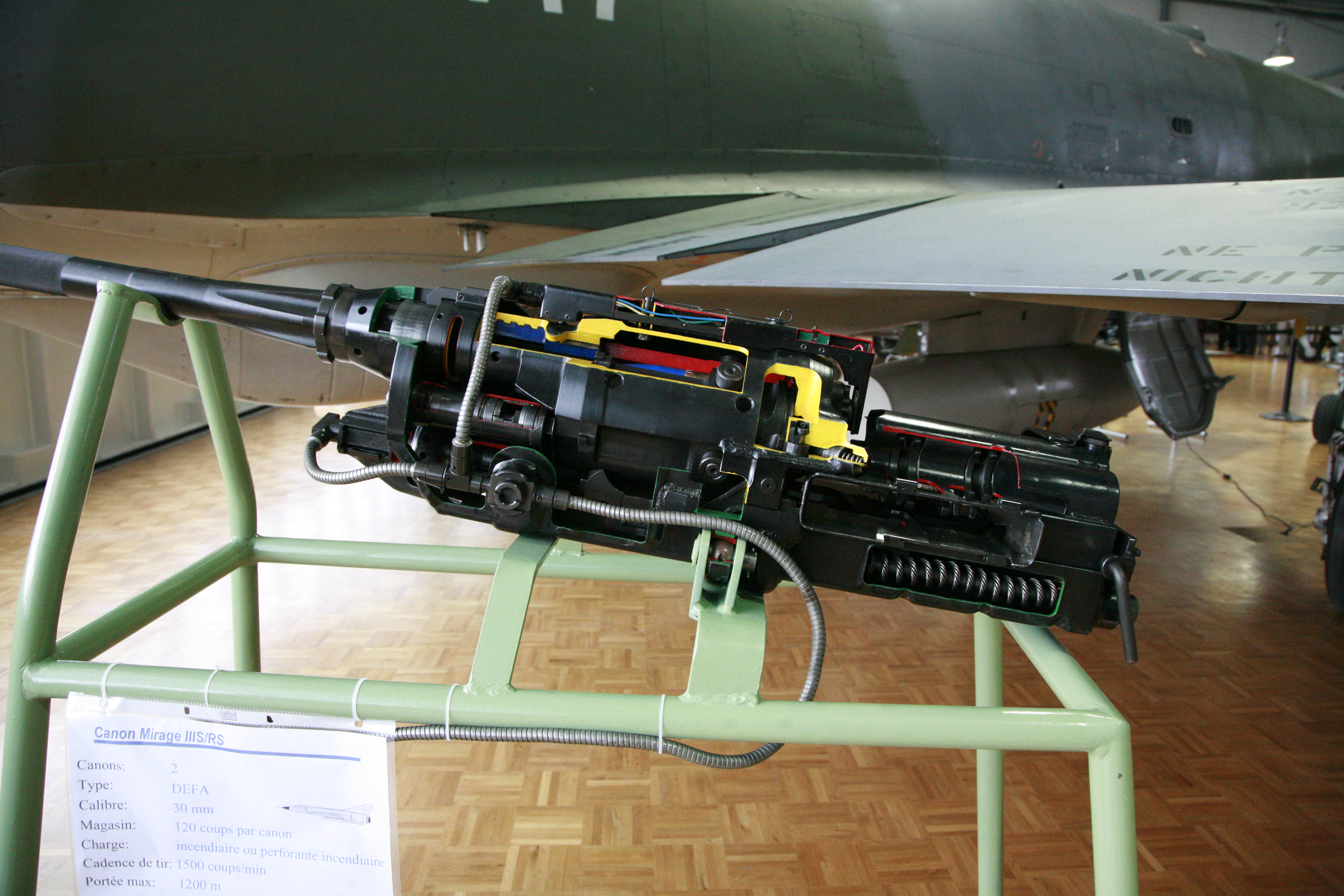
Cut-away model of a DEFA cannon for instruction

The DEFA 553 is a gas-operated five-chamber revolver cannon using pyrotechnic cocking and electrical ignition. It fires a range of 30 mm ammunition of various types, and is capable of continuous fire or 0.5-second or 1-second bursts.

The 553 was superseded by the DEFA 554, which incorporates a number of detail improvements. The DEFA 554 uses three, rather than two, of the chambers for reloading, increasing the rate of fire. Barrel life and mechanical reliability are improved, and an electrical control unit allows the pilot to select two rates of fire: 1,800 rounds per minute for air-to-air use or 1,200 rounds per minute for air-to-ground attacks. The 554 also provides three pyrotechnic cocking charges rather than one, allowing the pilot to cock the weapon after take-off and have two cartridges to re-cock the weapon if necessary in flight.

== Service use ==
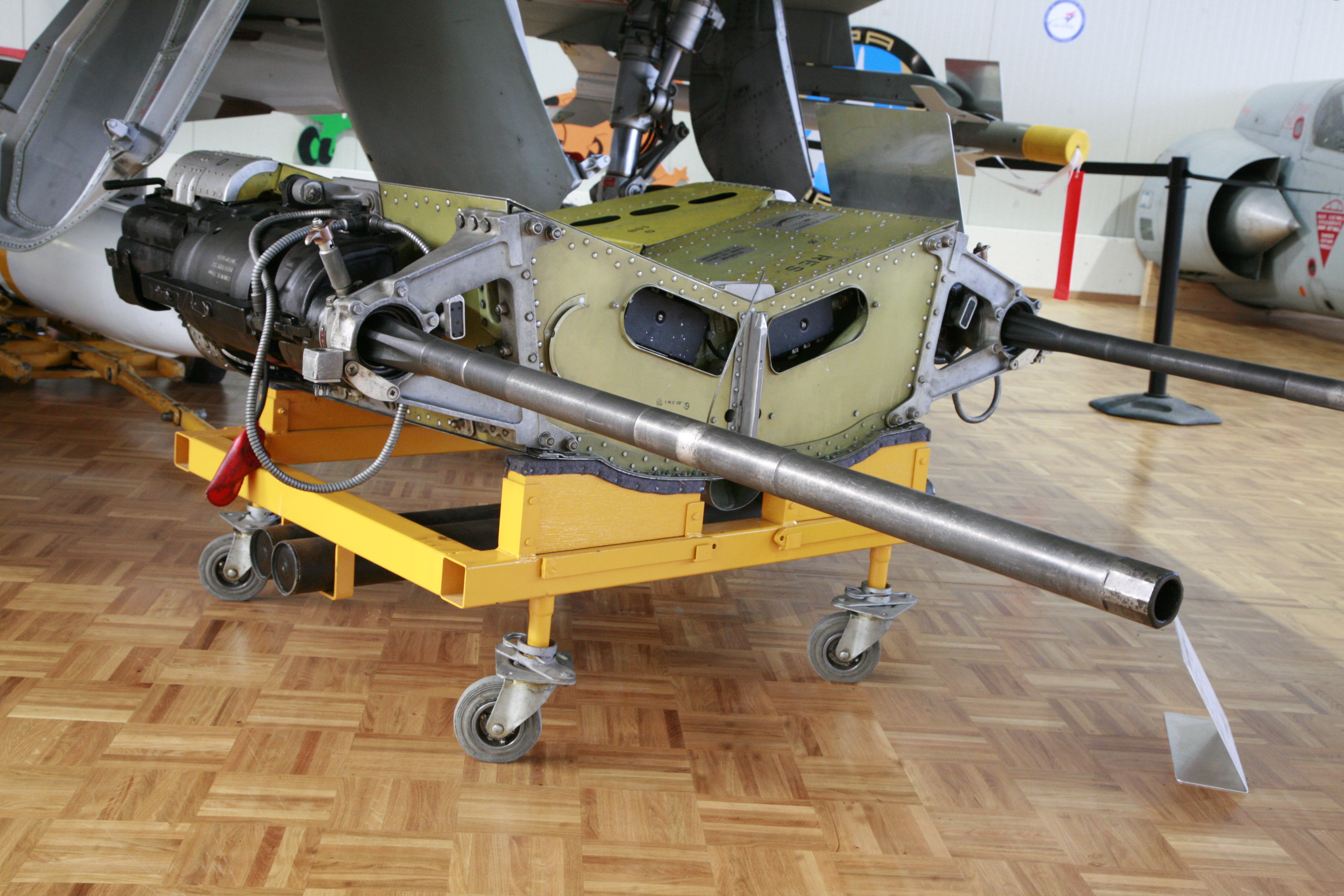
DEFA cannon of a Mirage III in twin mount

The DEFA 550 series was the standard cannon armament of all gun-armed French fighters from 1954 until the advent of the Dassault Rafale in the 1980s. A pair of these weapons, with 125–135 rounds per gun, is standard fit on the Brazilian ground-attack aircraft AMX International AMX, the French Dassault MD 450 Ouragan, Dassault Mystere, Mirage III/V, Dassault Étendard IV and Dassault Super Étendard, Sud Aviation Vautour, Mirage F1, SEPECAT Jaguar, and the Mirage 2000 series. It was also used on Israeli Douglas A-4E/F/H/N Skyhawks, IAI Nesher, IAI Kfir, and IAI Lavi, the Italian Fiat G.91Y and Aermacchi MB-326K, the Indonesian A-4, and the South African Atlas Cheetah and Impala Mk.II. Various gun pod installations are available from CASA, Dassault Aviation, and Matra.

The DEFA 550 is very similar to the British ADEN cannon, and can use the same ammunition.

The DEFA 550 series has given way to the GIAT 30 series used on the Dassault Rafale, although it is likely to remain in widespread use for many years.

On 2 October 2026, an Ukrainian Mirage 2000-5F shot down a Russian S8000 Banderol cruise missile with its onboard 30 mm DEFA 554, in a first kill of its kind.

== Variants ==
- DEFA 551 for the Dassault Mystère IV, the Dassault Mystère IIC, and the Sud Aviation Vautour
- DEFA 552 for the Dassault Super Mystère B2, the Dassault Étendard IV, and the Aeritalia G.91Y
- DEFA 552A for the Mirage III/5/50, the Nesher/Dagger/Finger, the IAI Kfir, and the IAI Lavi
- DEFA 553 for the Dassault Mirage F1, the Alpha Jet, the SEPECAT Jaguar, the Dassault-Breguet Super Étendard, the Mirage 2000D RMV, the Aermacchi MB-326K, the CASA C-101, the Atlas Cheetah, the Impala Mk II, the IA-58B/C, and the IA-63
- DEFA 554 for the single-seat Mirage 2000, the AMX A-1, the IA-58D, and the IA-63

== Operators ==
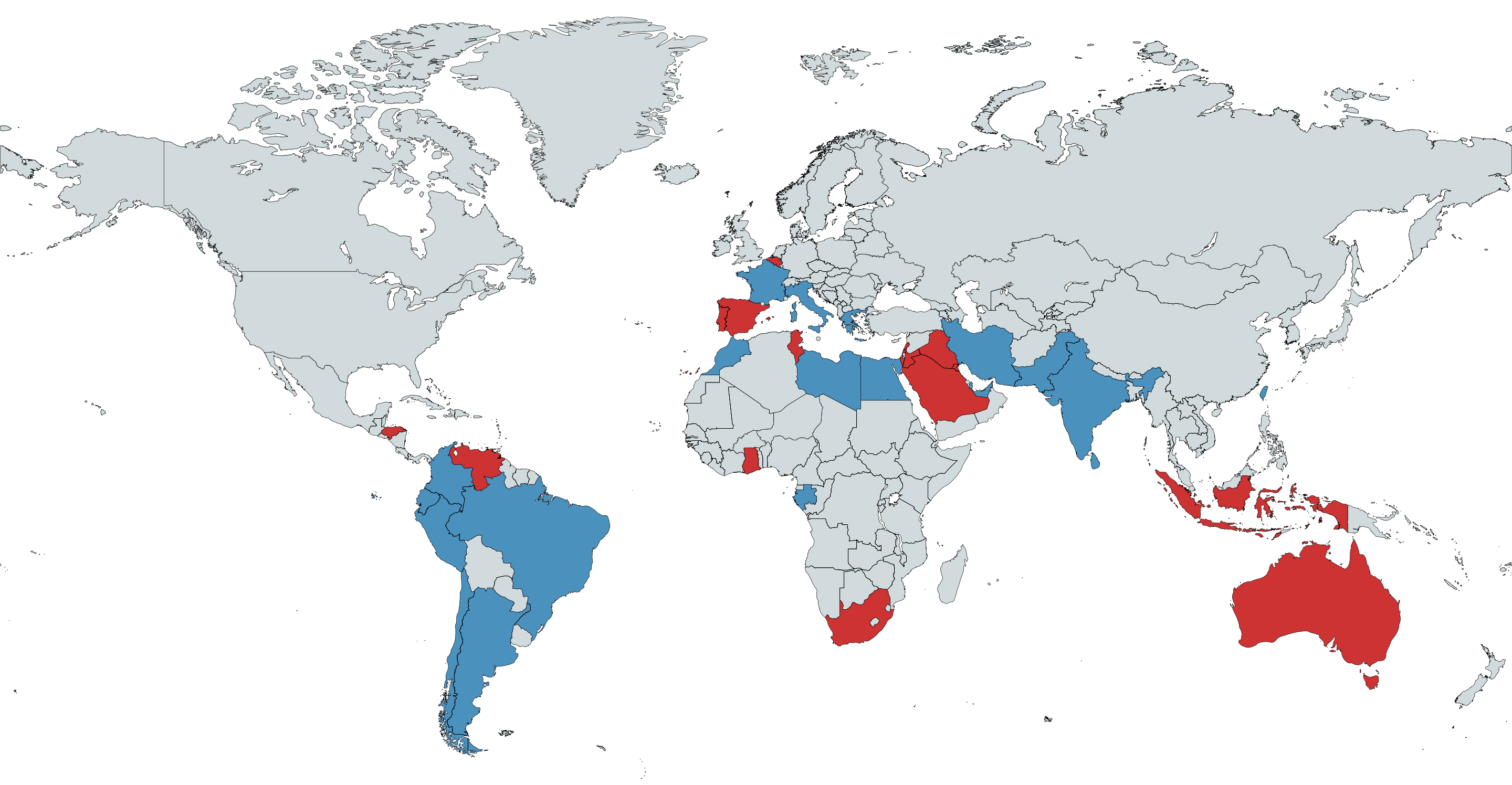
Map with operators of the DEFA cannon in blue and former operators in red

=== Current operators ===
- Argentina: A-4 and IA-63, previously IA-58, Finger, Dagger, Mirage 5P, Super Étendard Modernisé, and Mirage III
- Brazil: AMX, previously Mirage 2000C/B and Mirage III
- Chile: A-36 Toqui/C-101CC, previously Mirage 50, Mirage 5 and Mirage III
- Colombia: Kfir Block 60, previously Mirage 5
- Ecuador: Cheetah, previously Mirage F1, Kfir, Mirage 50 and Impala Mk II
- Egypt: Mirage 2000EM/BM and Mirage 5
- France: Mirage 2000, previously Super Étendard, Mirage F1, Jaguar, Mirage 5, Étendard IVM, Mirage III, Super Mystère B2, Mystère IV, Mystère IIC, and Vautour II
- Gabon: Mirage F1, previously Mirage 5
- Greece: Mirage 2000-5 Mk2, previously Mirage F1
- India: Mirage 2000I/TI, previously Mystère IV
- Iran: Mirage F1
- Italy: MB-339A & CD
- Libya: Mirage F1, previously Mirage 5
- Morocco: Mirage F1 ASTRAC
- Pakistan: Mirage 5 ROSE and Mirage III
- Peru: Mirage 2000P/DP, previously Mirage 5P
- Qatar: Mirage 2000-5, previously Mirage F1
- Sri Lanka: Kfir
- Taiwan: Mirage 2000-5
- UAE: Mirage 2000-9, previously Mirage 5, Mirage III, and MB-326K

=== Former operators ===
- Australia: Mirage III
- Belgium: Mirage 5
- Ghana: MB-326K
- Honduras: Super Mystère B2
- Indonesia: A-4
- Iraq: Super Étendard and Mirage F1
- Israel: A-4, Lavi, Kfir, Nesher, Mirage 5, Mirage IIIC, Super Mystère B2, Mystère IV, and Vautour II
- Italy: G.91Y
- Jordan: C-101CC and Mirage F1
- Kuwait: Mirage F1
- Lebanon: Mirage III
- Portugal: G.91 R/3
- Saudi Arabia: Mirage 5
- South Africa: Cheetah, Mirage F1, Nesher, Mirage III and Impala Mk II
- Spain: Mirage F1 and Mirage III
- Tunisia: MB-326K
- Venezuela: Mirage 50, Mirage 5 and Mirage III
- Zaire: Mirage 5 and MB-326K

== See also ==
- ADEN cannon – comparable British design, shorter 111mm long variant
- VENOM LR 30 mm – British 21st century derivative of ADEN, 113mm long variant
- GIAT 30 - comparable French design, 113mm & 150mm long
- Oerlikon KCA - comparable Swiss design, 173mm long
- VENOM 30 mm – British 173mm long variant
- Mauser BK-27 – comparable German design, 27mm diameter
- R-23 cannon – comparable Russian design, 23mm
- M39 cannon – comparable US design, 20mm diameter
