= Oerlikon KCA =

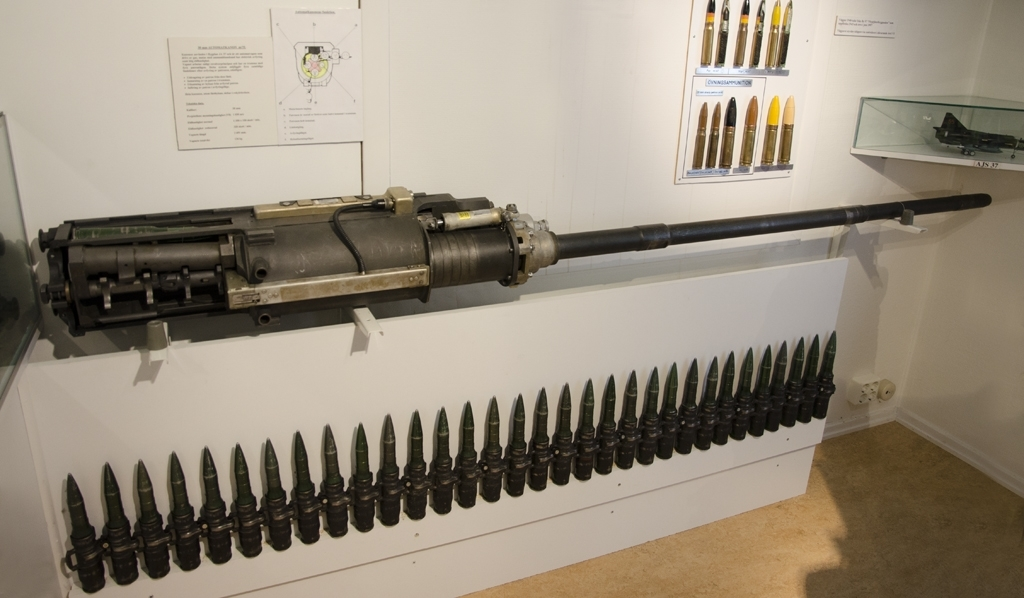
- Type: Automatic cannon
- Place of origin: Switzerland

Service history
- Used by: Swedish Air Force, Saab 37 Viggen

Production history
- Designer: Oerlikon Contraves (now Rheinmetall Air Defence)
- Designed: 1950s - 1960s

Specifications
- Mass: 136 kg (300 lb)
- Length: 2.69 m (8 ft 10 in)
- Barrel length: 1.98 m (6 ft 6 in)
- Shell: 30×173 mm
- Calibre: 30mm
- Barrels: 1
- Action: Four-chamber revolver
- Rate of fire: 1,350 rounds/min
- Muzzle velocity: 1,030 m/s (3,400 ft/s)

The Oerlikon KCA is a Swiss 30 mm (1.2 in) gas-operated single-barrel revolver cannon. This gun lead to the development of several successors.

== Oerlikon KCA development and use ==
During its development, the Oerlikon KCA was internally known as the 304-Rk. This cannon was developed to be used by aircraft. The development took place in the 1950s and the 1960s, and the production started in the 1970s.

This variant uses 30×173 mm rounds. The KCA round is 50% heavier than the NATO standard 30×113 mm ammunition used on ADEN and DEFA cannon. It can fire up to 1350 rounds per minute at a muzzle velocity of 1030 m/s, with an effective range of 2,500 m (8,200 ft). This variant uses percussion primed rounds.

=== Use of the KCA ===
The weapon began production for the Swedish Air Force in the 1970s. The Oerlikon KCA became the gun of the JA 37 Viggen fighter.

It was selected after testing several cannons, including the British ADEN cannon, the American M61 Vulcan, and French DEFA cannon. The KCA was carried, along with 126 rounds of ammunition, in a conformal pod under the fuselage. It was known as the akan m/75 by the Swedish armed forces.

The KCA was offered to the US military and was tested against the GAU-8 which became the cannon of the A-10 Warthog. The KCA received the GAU-9/A designation by the US military.

== Further developments ==
=== Oerlikon KCE ===
The Oerlikon KCE was developed by Rheinmetall Air Defence in Switzerland.

Some of the differences with the KCA include:

- a slower rate of fire with 1,200 rounds per minute (nominal rate), and 200 rounds per minute (single shots)
- equipped with an electromagnetic muzzle programing unit for KETF ammunition:
  - PMC308 - AHEAD munitions
  - PMC455 - AHEAD munitions
- a new trigger assembly and a new electric cocking device.

==== Use of the KCE ====
The KCE is used with two main systems:

- Rheinmetall Sea Snake 30, a CIWS system
- Skyranger 30, a SHORAD system

== Operators ==
=== Current operators ===
==== Sea Snake 30 ====
Brazil
Sea Snake 30 used with the Tamandaré-class frigate (MEKO A-100). One cannon per frigate, with 8 frigates planned in total, and 3 already in service.

==== Skyranger 30 ====
Germany (1 + 18)
The German Army ordered 19 systems on GTK Boxer vehicles for €595 million in February 2024 and 30 more are planned. They will be armed with Stinger missiles. The first 19 systems package includes a test vehicle, followed by 18 production vehicles. The variant of the German Army will carry 9 SADM missiles.
The test vehicle was delivered to the German Army in February 2025.

=== Future operators ===
==== Skyranger 30 ====
Austria (36 ordered + 9 in option)

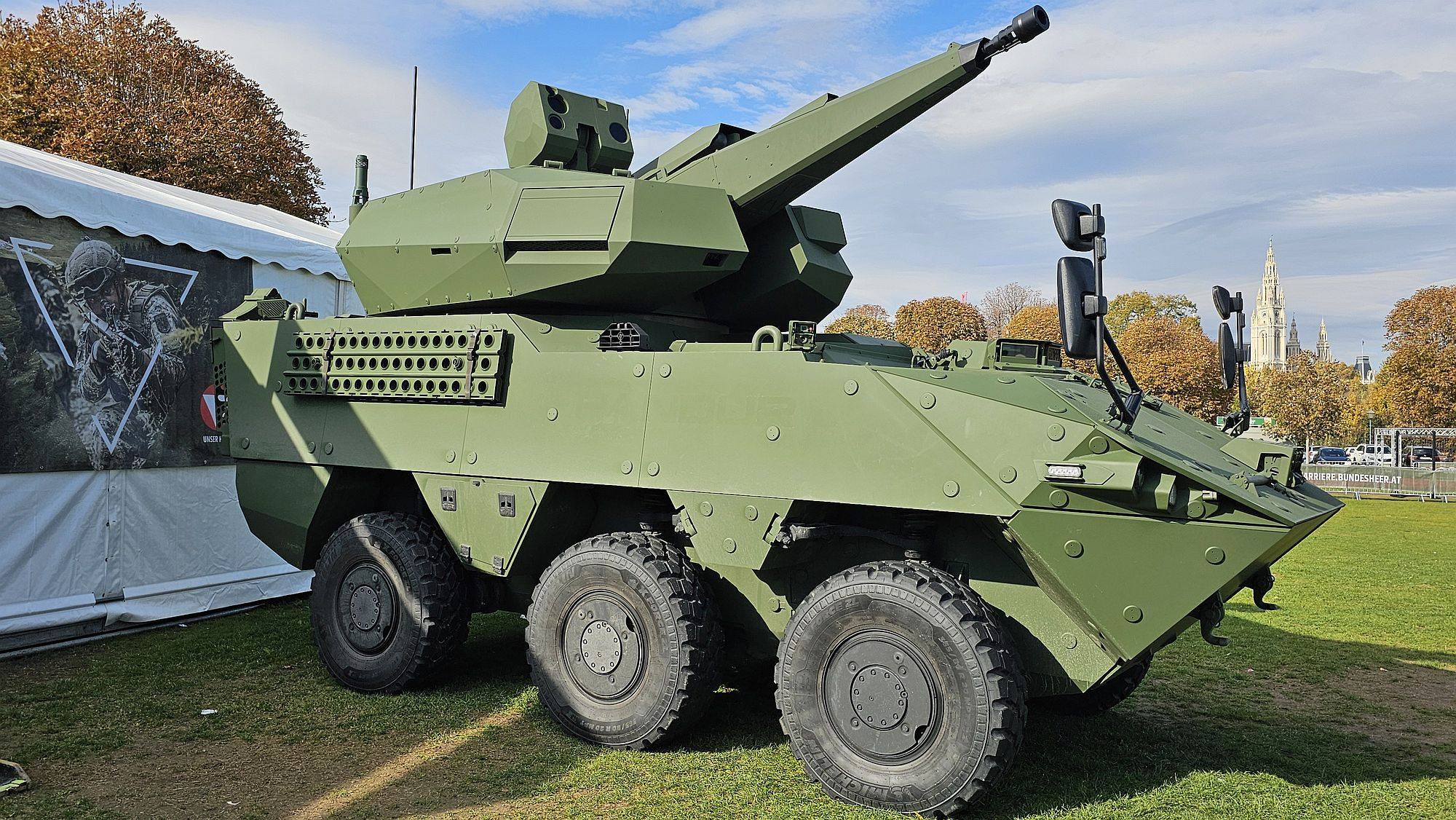
Pandur EVO Skyranger 30 prototype of the Austrian Armed Forces

The Austrian Armed Forces signed a contract in February 2024 for 36 systems mounted on Pandur EVO vehicles. The short-range air defence system will be delivered from 2026 and the turrets will be equipped with Mistral missiles. The order includes also an option for 9 additional systems. The turret of the Austrian version is one ton lighter than the standard turret and carries only two missiles due to the lower load capacity 6×6 chassis.
Denmark (4 prototypes + 12 systems ordered)
The Danish Defence Acquisition and Logistics Organisation announced, on 16 May 2023, that it had chosen Skyranger 30 to be mounted on Danish Mowag Piranha V, for air defence. It will be equipped with the Mistral 3 missiles.
In September 2024, the Danish authorities commissioned Rheinmetall Air Defence for 16 turrets:
- 4 prototypes and pre-production turrets to be delivered by the end of 2026
- 12 to be delivered in 2027 and 2028
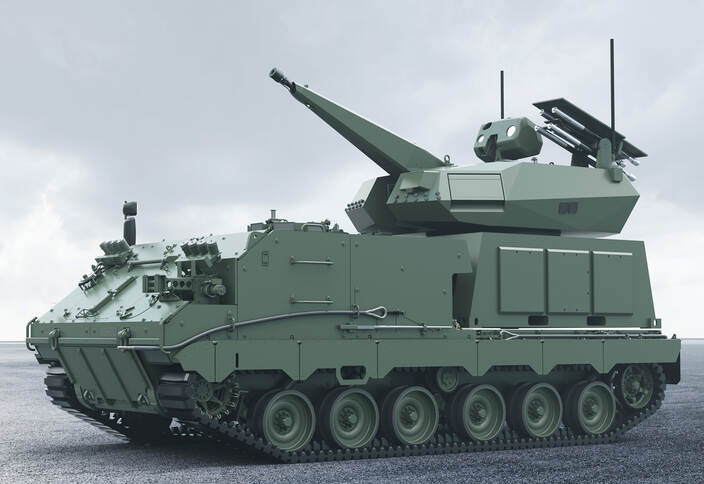
  Netherlands' Skyranger 30 on ACSV G5 chassis
Netherlands (22 systems ordered)
The Netherlands Army has ordered 22 systems, which will be built on the Armoured Combat Support Vehicle (ACSV) tracked platform. The contract will be signed in 2025, and the delivery of the first systems is planned for 2028.
Sweden (8 systems ordered)

- CB90 – Ship class Combat Boats, together with the Hensoldt Spexer 2000 3D MK III Naval radar system

=== Potential sales ===
==== Sea Snake 30 ====
Germany
The Sea Snake 30 might be selected as part of the programme qNFMLG (querschnittliche Nachfolgelösung für das Marineleichtgeschütz). This programme will see the purchase of 75 RCWS for the German Navy, and 100 in option.

==== Skyranger 30 ====
Belgium
In June 2025, the minister of defence announced that the Belgian Land Component would purchase Skyranger 30 systems. The plan is for 20 systems, but the vehicle has not been specified yet.
Czech Republic
The Czech Army showed interest for the Skyranger 30 which was presented at IDET 2025. It might be installed on the Pandur II 8×8 Evolution.
Germany
As of early July 2025, the Bundeswehr is expected to purchase 500 to 600 Skyranger 30 in total. With it, 30 full weapon packages per weapon.
In order to reach this goal, the orders with 500 to 600 systems would include:
- 4,500,000 to 5,400,000 (300 rounds of 30mm AHEAD per system)
- 135,000 to 162,000 MBDA Deutschland DefendAir (9 missiles per system) At the end of July, the government told Reuters that well over 100 systems would be ordered at the moment.
Hungary
The government of Hungary signed a memorandum of understanding in 2021 about developing a Lynx-based air defence vehicle, using the Skyranger 30 turrets with Mistral missiles. Rheinmetall receives development order from Hungary for Skyranger 30 turret for the future Lynx KF41. The value of the order is €30 million and covers the integration of the Mistral missiles as well. Colonel-General Gábor Böröndi, Chief of the General Staff of the Hungarian Armed Forces, said in a late 2023 interview: "We are also planning to purchase the SkyRanger system, which is suitable for destroying aerial targets and drones. We are developing it together with the Germans and the Danes, it will be ready and adopted within a year or two." This means that the Hungarian Armed Forces should receive their first Skyrangers in 2025 or 2026.
According to unconfirmed press reports, Hungary plans to purchase 18 Skyranger air defence vehicles.
Italy
As part of the programme planning to purchase 1,050 KF-41 Lynx, the Italian Army is planning to purchase a variant for air-defence, equipped with a cannon.

=== Former operators ===
Sweden
The Oerlikon KCA was used with the Saab 37 Viggen.

== See also ==
- VENOM 30 mm – British 113mm long variant
- GIAT 30 - comparable French design, 150mm & 113mm long
- VENOM LR 30 mm – British 21st century derivative of ADEN, 113mm long variant
- DEFA cannon – comparable older French design, 113mm long
- ADEN cannon – comparable older British design, 113mm
- Mauser BK-27 – comparable German design, 27×145mm
- R-23 cannon – comparable Russian design, 23×260mm (telescoped)
- M39 cannon – comparable older US design, 20×102mm
