= Revolver gun =

Revolver gun may refer to:

- revolver, a type of handgun
- revolver cannon, a type of automatic gun firing large-caliber shells
