= Mauser MG 213 =

German autocannon

Mauser MG 213 cannon
- Type: Aircraft cannon
- Place of origin: Nazi Germany

Service history
- Wars: World War II

Production history
- Manufacturer: Mauser
- Variants: 20 mm and 30 mm caliber

Specifications
- Mass: 75 kg (165 lb); 96 kg (212 lb) assembled
- Length: 1,907 mm (75.1 in) (20 mm); 1,630 mm (64 in) (30 mm)
- Barrel length: 1,394 mm (54.9 in) (20 mm); 1,295 mm (51.0 in) (30 mm)
- Cartridge: 20x135mm (112g); 30×85mmB (330g)
- Calibre: 20 mm (0.79 in) (112g); 30 mm (1.2 in) (330g)
- Action: Short recoil gas outlet, revolving cartridge feed
- Rate of fire: 1300-1400 rounds/min (~21 rounds/s) (20 mm); 1100-1200 rounds (30 mm)
- Muzzle velocity: 1,050 m/s (3,400 ft/s) (20 mm); 530 m/s (1,700 ft/s) (30 mm)
- Feed system: Belt

The Mauser MG 213 was a 20 mm aircraft-mounted revolver cannon developed for the Luftwaffe during World War II. A further development using a 30 mm round was developed as the MG 213C, alternately known as the MK 213. Neither design was put into service before the war ended.

The designs were studied by the Allies after the end of war. The 30 mm version was copied almost without change to form the British ADEN and French DEFA, while the 20 mm version was used by the US as the basis for the M39 cannon.

== Background ==
During World War II, the German firm Mauser began development of a radically new 20 mm autocannon using a motorised firing mechanism in order to improve the rate of fire. The weapon got the preliminary designation Mauser MG 213 and by the late-war period the design was beginning to mature. However the presence of large heavy bombers such as the Boeing B-17 Flying Fortress and Avro Lancaster led to the need of to arm Luftwaffe fighter aircraft with heavier cannons. Mauser responded by adapting the MG 213 to fire the 30 mm rounds from the MK 108 cannon. This variant was given the preliminary designation Maschinenkanone 213, as the 30 mm caliber meant that the weapon was classed as a cannon in German nomenclature. The 30 mm rounds on the MK 108 cannon had a fairly short cartridge with limited propellant capacity (30×90mm), providing a low muzzle velocity of around 550 m/s (1,800 ft/s). However, as they were adapted with mine shells, which could effectively knock out any aircraft at the time with just a few hits, they did not need high velocity to be effective against non-manoeuvering targets like bombers. Despite frantic efforts, production of the MK 213 never commenced due to development problems such as excessive barrel wear, and to the Allied Combined Bomber Offensive campaign against German industry. At the end of the war only 5 prototypes (V1 to V5) of either 20 mm MG 213 or 30 mm MK 213 had been finished.

== Operation ==
The gun was developed by Mauser but, as far as known, was never deployed. It was developed from an earlier design: the MG 213A. The MG 213A utilized a gas-driven operation. In the MG 213, the direct movement of the revolver cassette was changed to a diagonal cam with a follower. This actuated a rammer that both fed cartridges into the cylinders and revolved the cassette. Sealing was accomplished by packing the cylinder and breech with heat resistant steel. This innovation allowed chamber movement while the gas pressure was very high. The revolver cassette had five chambers and at least 3 chambers were full during operation, feeding, firing, and extracting. The cylinder was fed at the 5 o'clock position and fired at the 12 o'clock position. Upon discovery of examples of the gun, it caught the attention of autocannon developers in Switzerland, France, Britain, and the US. The British ADEN cannon was developed eight years later, while the US M39E cannon, first designated T-160, was rushed into combat evaluation during the Korean War.

== 20mm MG 213 ==
- Caliber: 20 × 135mm
- Weight: 75 kg (165 lb); assembled 96 kg (212 lb)
- Length: 1,930 mm (76 in)
- Barrel length: 1,600 mm (63 in)
- Rate of fire: 1200–1400 rounds/min (~21 rounds/s)
- Muzzle velocity: 1,050 m/s (3,400 ft/s)

== 30mm MK 213 ==
- Caliber: 30 × 85R mm
- Weight: 75 kg (165 lb); assembled 96 kg (212 lb)
- Length: 1,630 mm (64 in)
- Barrel length: 1,300 mm (51 in)
- Rate of fire: 1000–1200 rounds/min
- Muzzle velocity: 530 m/s (1,700 ft/s)

== See also ==
- BK 5 cannon (MK 214)
- MG 151 cannon
- MK 108 cannon
