= M39 cannon =

M39
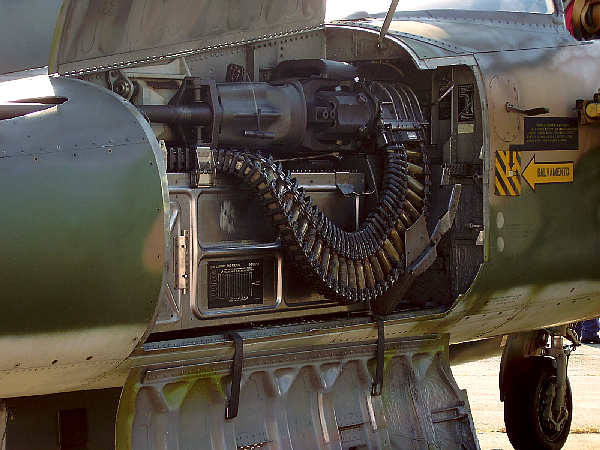
- M39 cannon in the nose of a Brazilian F-5
- Type: Single-barrel autocannon
- Place of origin: United States

Service history
- In service: 1952–present

Production history
- Designer: Ford Motor Company
- Designed: 1951
- Manufacturer: Pontiac, Ford, FMC Corporation, and others
- No. built: 35,500+
- Variants: M39, M39A1, M39A2, M39A3

Specifications
- Mass: 80.9 kg (178.5 lb)
- Length: 1.83 m
- Cartridge: 20×102mm
- Caliber: 20 mm (0.8 in)
- Barrels: Single barrel (progressive RH parabolic twist, 9 grooves)
- Action: five-chamber revolver
- Rate of fire: 1,500 rpm
- Muzzle velocity: 1,030 m/s (3,300 ft/s)

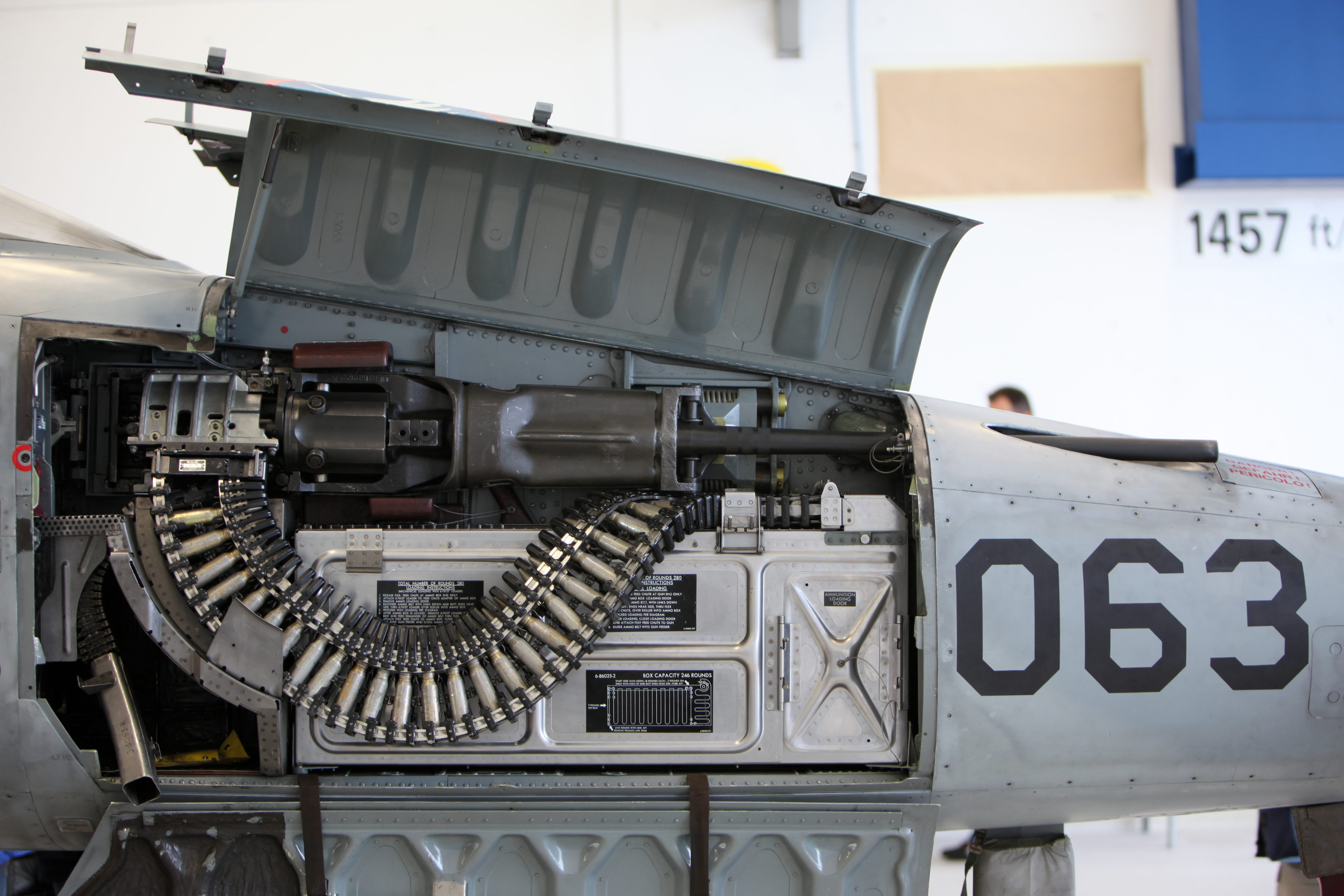
The M39 cannon with its 20 mm ammunition chute

The M39 cannon is a 20 mm caliber single-barreled revolver cannon developed for the United States Air Force in the late 1940s. It was used on a number of fighter aircraft from the early 1950s through the 1980s. The M61 Vulcan has replaced it in most roles.

== Development ==
The M39 was developed by the Springfield Armory, based on the World War II–era design of the German Mauser MG 213, a 20 mm (and 30 mm) cannon developed for the Luftwaffe, which did not see combat use. The same design inspired the 30 mm British ADEN cannon and the French DEFA, but American designers chose a smaller 20 mm round to increase the weapon's rate of fire and muzzle velocity at the expense of hitting power. The 20×102mm round was later chosen by France for the M621 cannon.

Initially designated the T-160, the new gun was installed for combat testing on a number of F-86 Sabre aircraft under the "GunVal" program in late 1952, and used in action over Korea in early 1953. The results of the program were startling, with the GUNVAL F-86F's having downed 6 MIG fighters and damaged 12 others. This signaled the end of the M3 .50 caliber as the preferred fighter weapon system ongoing. It was subsequently adopted as standard armament of the F-86H fighter-bomber, F-100 Super Sabre, F-101A and F-101C Voodoo, and the F-5 Freedom Fighter. The M39 was also used on the B-57B tactical bomber. Current models of the F-5 Tiger II still use the M39A2 version of this weapon. The M39A2 was introduced in 1964.

The weapon is gas operated and consists of a five–chamber magazine running parallel to the barrel. Sealing was provided by a forcing cone that was pressed into the barrel. The sealing movement was at no time more than 1/4". A feeder mechanism ensured the proper placement of the rounds for ramming. This was powered by a feeder shaft that received kinetic force via the rotating magazine drum. This in turn was powered by propellant gas. The exterior of the 5-cylinder drum was studded with bearings that acted on a shifting cam located below the rammer/extractor platform. The gun could be set up for either right- or left-hand feed by switching the feeder head around. Some 35,000 were produced before being superseded by the M61 cannon which outperformed the M39 in almost every way. The only US aircraft still flying with the M39 is the Northrop F-5, an aircraft now only used for training. Extensive work had to be done on the forcing cone, heat dissipation, cook-off prevention, link testing, and reinforcement, to raise the mean time between failures to 1-in-1000 rounds fired. Four arms manufacturers, three independent companies, and a university research department, were involved in getting the weapon working correctly.

In Vietnam in 1967 the 116th Assault Helicopter Company operating out of Củ Chi Base Camp used the M39 mounted inverted on the forward hardpoints on the underside of a UH-1 helicopter, with ammunition feed out the left cargo door through a chute. The unit's report for May through July 1967 states, "A low-level type of attack has been used on bunker lines with a good deal of success. It consists of locating and pinpointing the target area, then turning out, dropping down to about 50 feet (15 m) (at 120 knots [220 km/h]) and when about 500 metres (1,600 ft) from the target, popping up to about 150 feet (46 m), turning hell, death and destruction onto the target, turning off, and being gone before Charlie recovers from the shock....It is most effective on huts or heavily wooded tree lines. A hut is almost totally destroyed, i.e., to the point of setting it on fire and reducing it to ashes, and a tree line is so effectively covered that many of the trees are defoliated or limbs, etc., blown off. In situations where the enemy is using less than bunker-type cover, the 20mm coverage is so effective that it is quite reasonable to assume that those individuals who were in the area are either dead or severely wounded." As to the ammunition, the same unit report says, "The ammunition is M-56AZ high explosive incendiary #12 link. It weighs almost one pound per round and has a bursting radius of 9 metres (30 ft). It is spin-actuated at about 50 metres (160 ft). It detonates upon contact with anything."

While a major leap forward in aircraft armament, all revolver cannon suffer from the effects of barrel wear, heat dissipation, and parts life. The final improved version of the M39 had barrel changes mandated at 4000 rounds. The system would be replaced by the M61 Vulcan in aircraft for this and MTBF as well as weight considerations.

== T-75 cannon ==
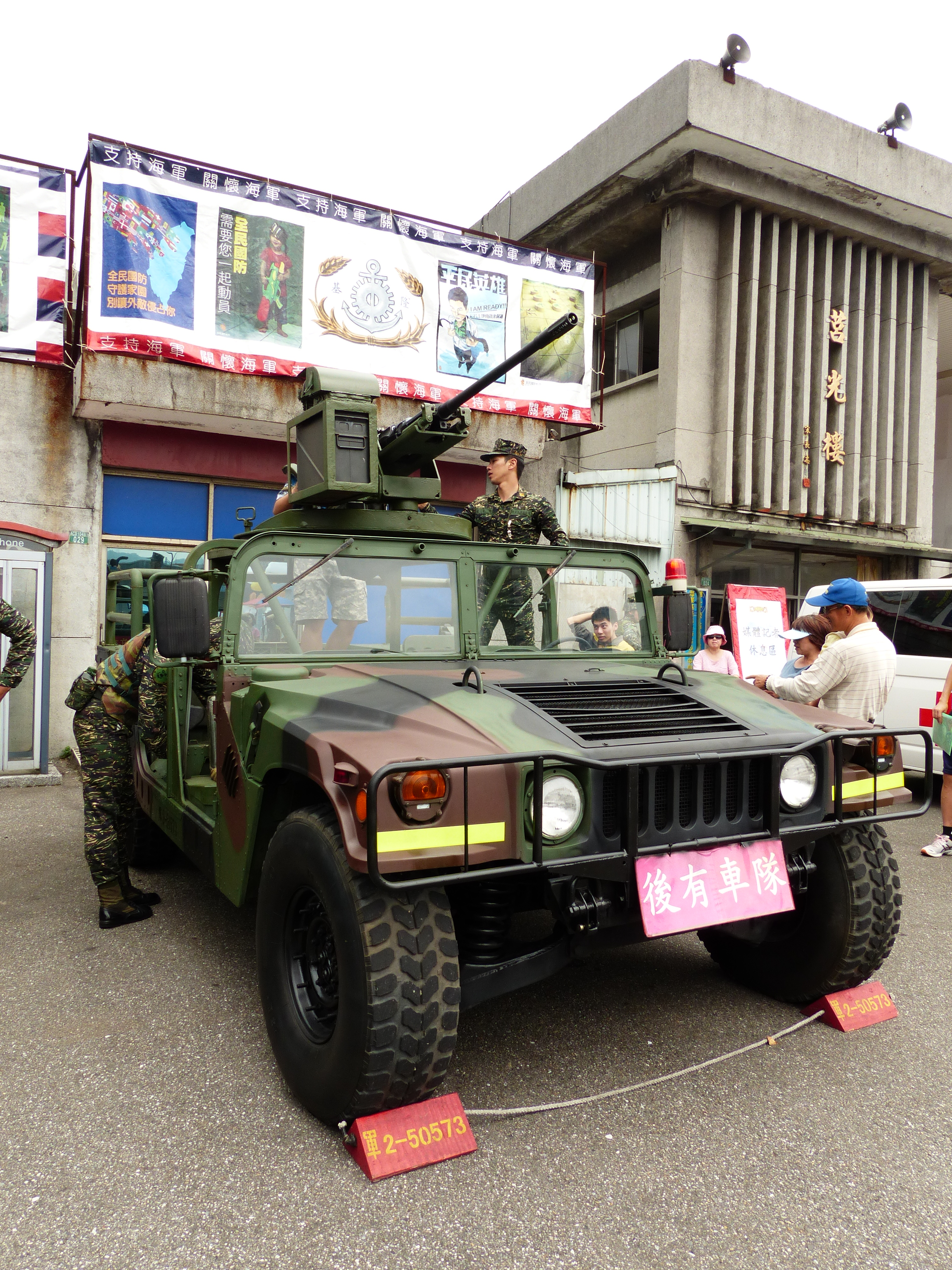
ROCMC Humvee with T-75M 20mm Cannon

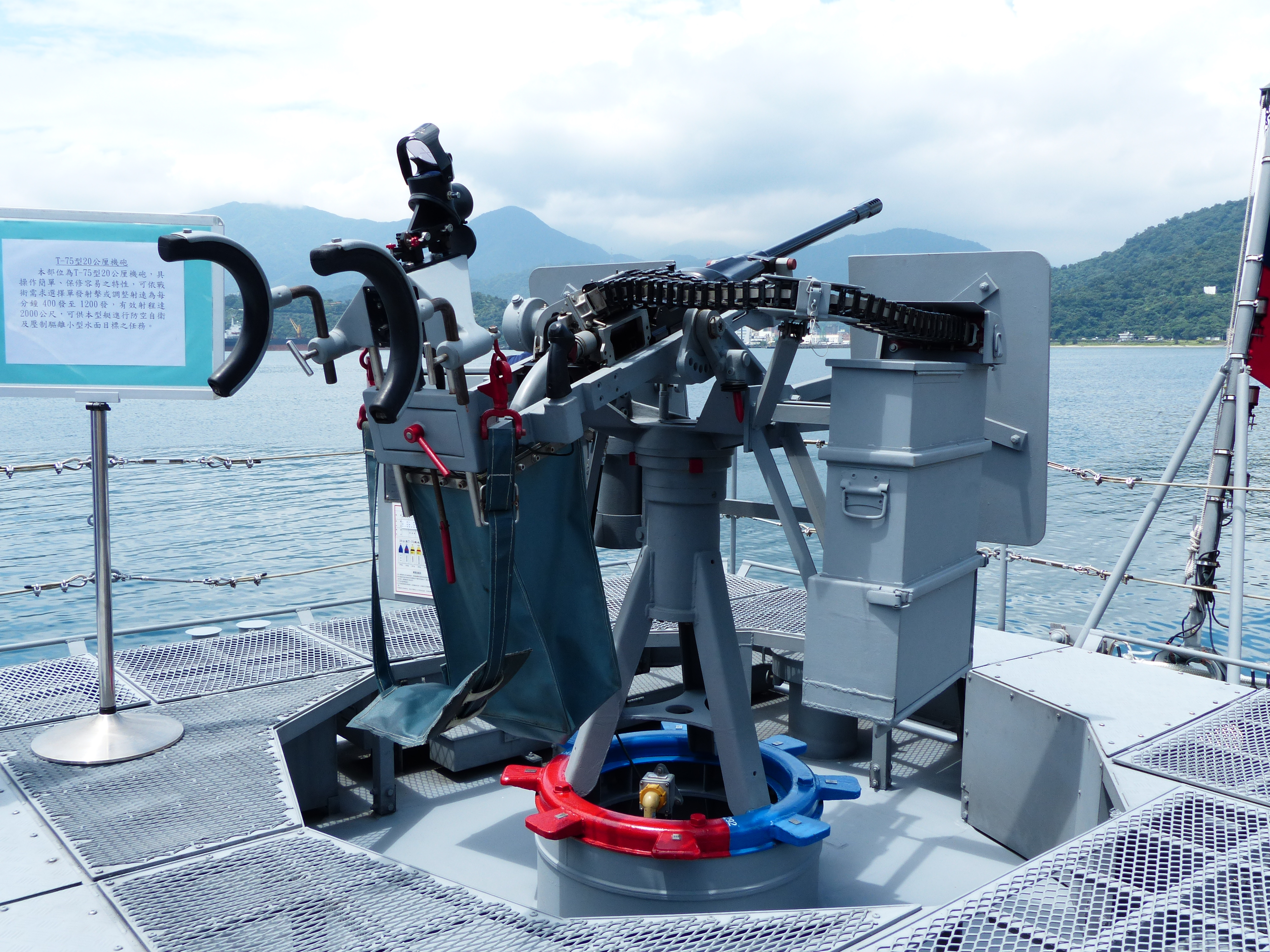
T-75S 20mm Cannon Mounted on FACG-77

The M39 served as the basis for the T-75 autocannon developed by Taiwan (Republic of China), as a more-powerful partial replacement for the M2HB machine gun onboard naval vessels and the HMMWV tactical vehicle, with its latest use being within the XTR-101 and XTR-102 weapon stations.

=== T-82T 20mm Twin Anti-Aircraft Cannon ===
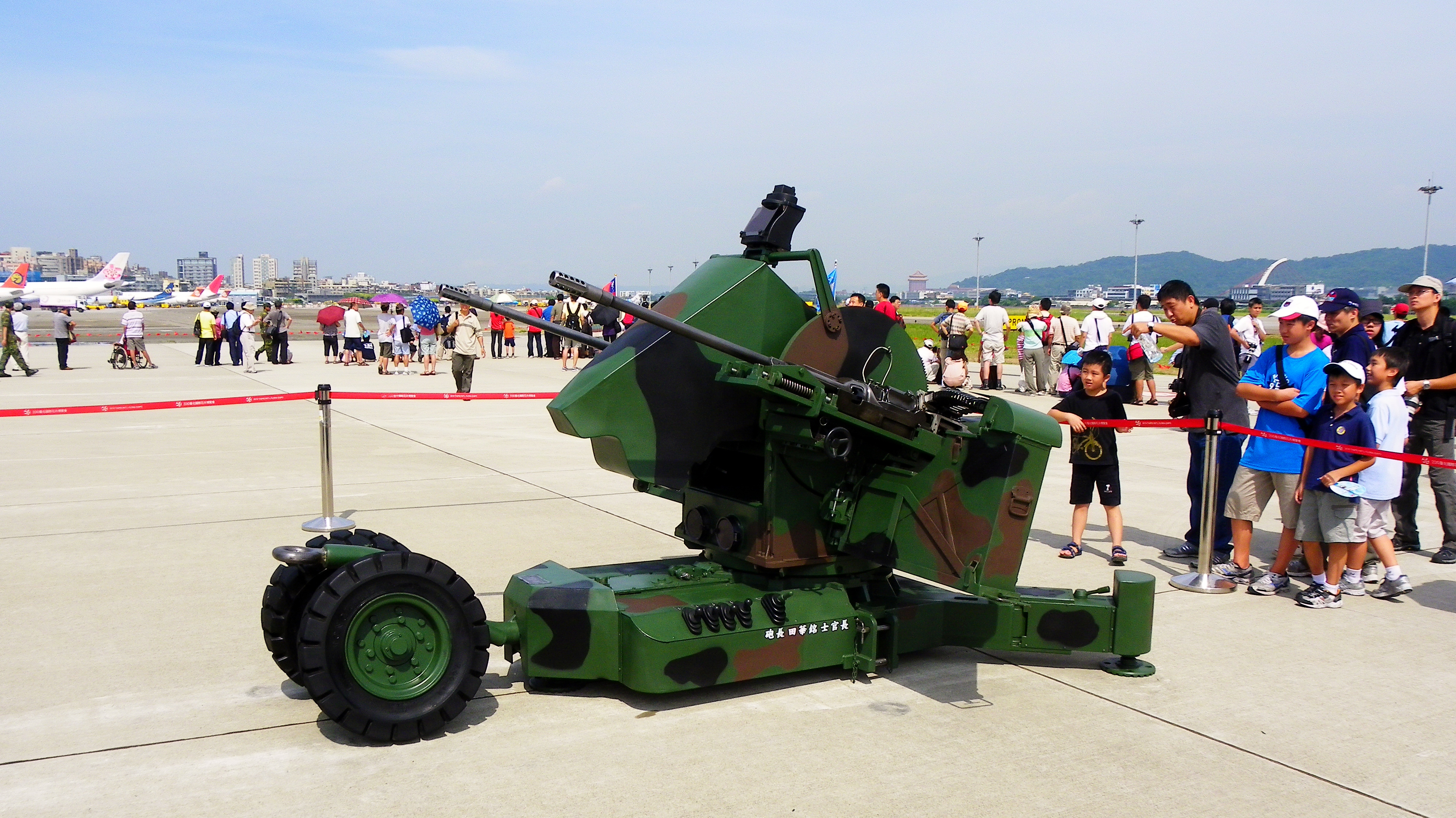
T-82T 20mm Twin Cannon

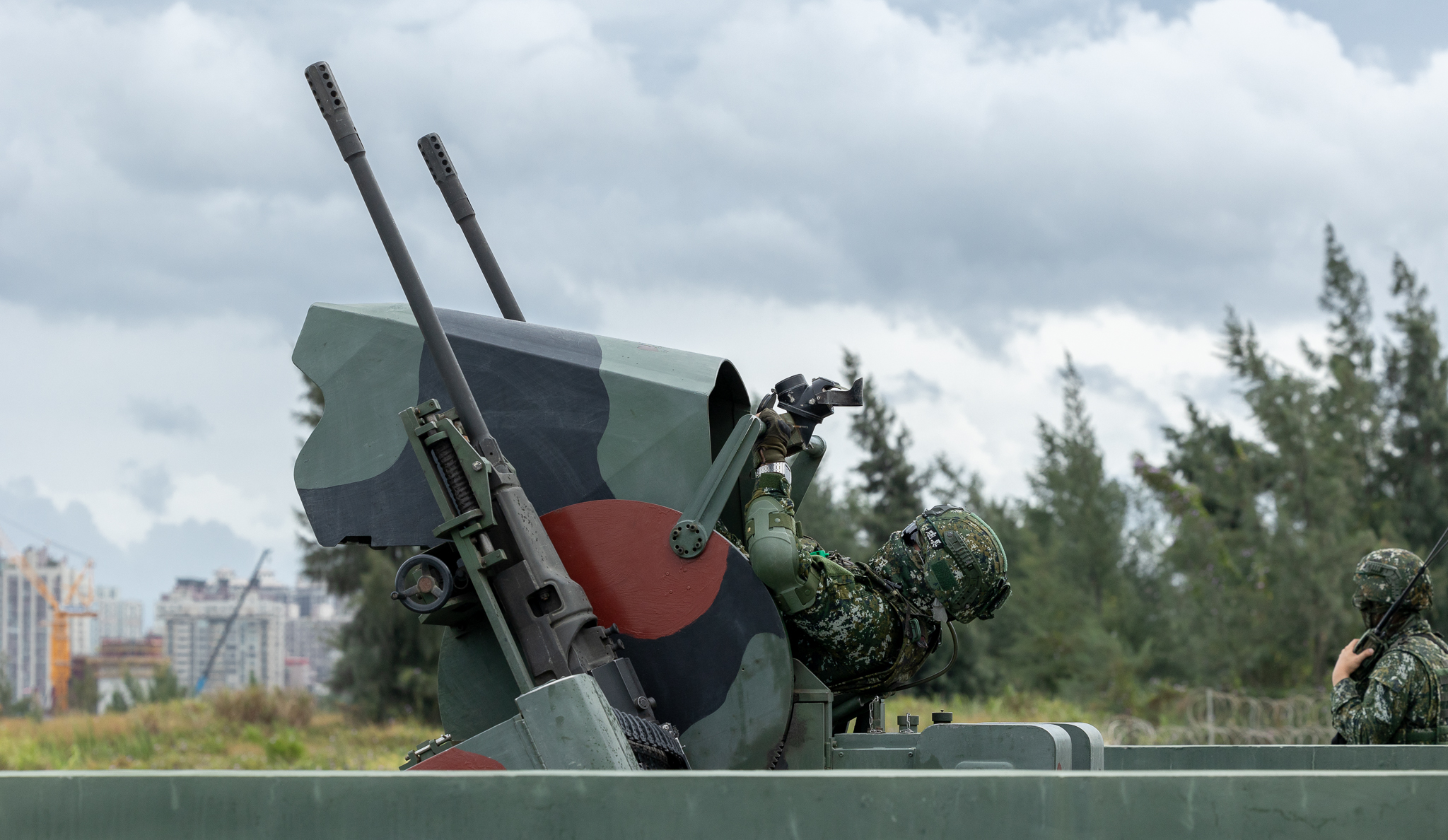
T-82 20mm Twin Cannon

The T-82 20mm Twin Anti-Aircraft Cannon as the basis for the T-75 autocannon developed by Taiwan (Republic of China).

== Projectile specifications ==
- Projectile weight: 101 grams (3.6 oz)
- Types

M56A3
HE-I with a 10.7 grams (0.38 oz) RDX explosive charge and a 1.3 grams (0.046 oz) incendiary charge
M242
HE-I-T
M53
AP-I steel tip has a 50% chance of penetrating 6.3 millimetres (0.25 in) of rolled homogenous armor at a range of 1,000 metres (3,300 ft) and striking angle of 0°.
M52
AP-I-T
M55A2
TP
M220
TP-T

== See also ==
- List of U.S. Army weapons by supply catalog designation (SNL A-91)
- Mauser BK-27—comparable German design
- Oerlikon KCA—comparable Swiss design
- R-23 cannon—comparable Russian design
