= Revolver cannon =

Type of autocannon commonly used as an aircraft gun

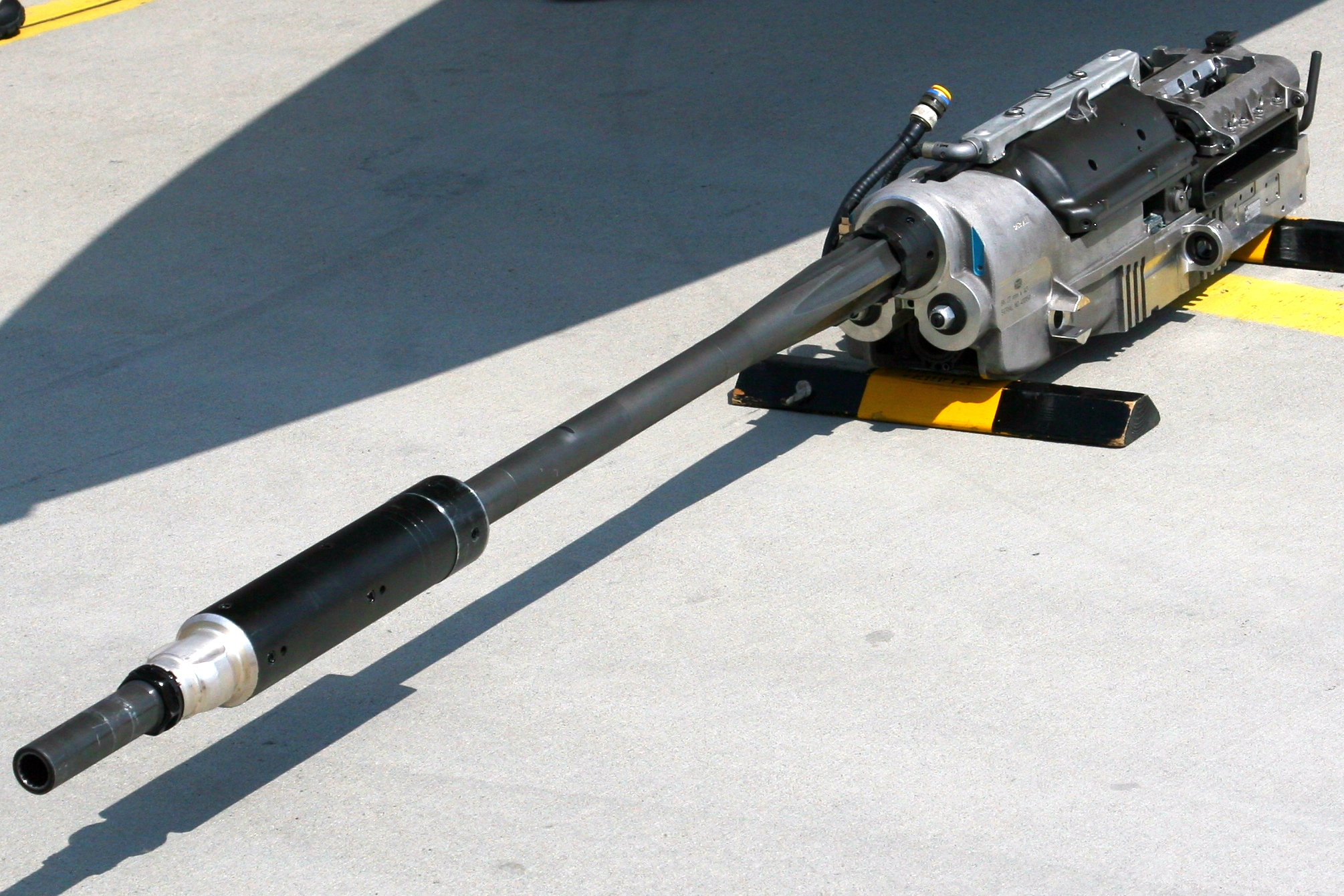
Modern Mauser BK-27 aircraft revolver cannon

A revolver cannon is a type of autocannon, commonly used as an aircraft gun. It uses a cylinder with multiple chambers, similar to those of a revolver handgun, to speed up the loading-firing-ejection cycle. Some examples are also power-driven, to further speed the loading process. Unlike a rotary cannon, a revolver cannon only has a single barrel, so its spun weight is lower. Automatic revolver cannons have been produced by many different manufacturers.

== History ==
=== Precursors ===
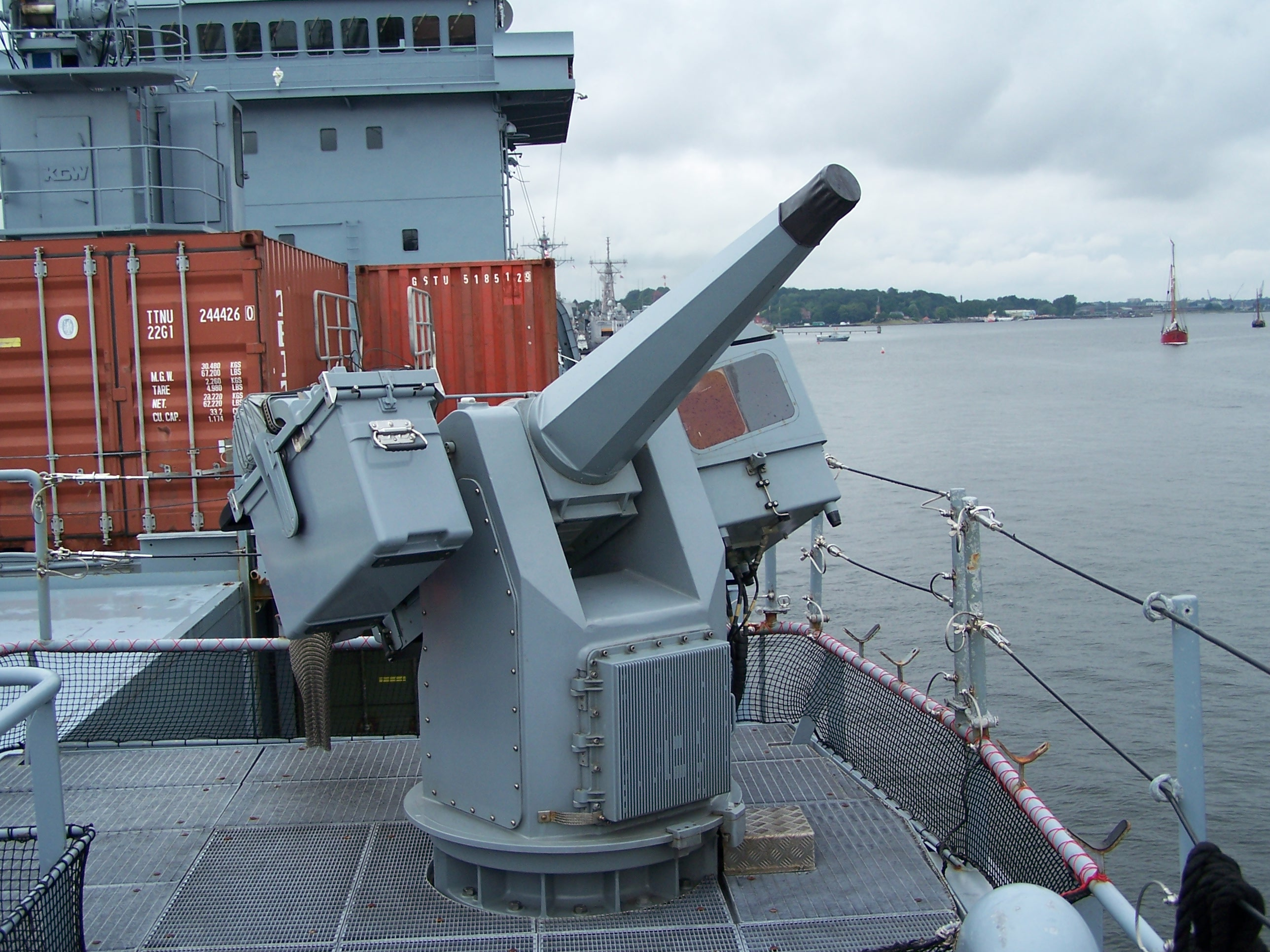
MLG 27 remote controlled revolver cannon on board an Elbe-class replenishment ship of the German Navy

An early precursor was the Puckle gun of 1718, a large flintlock revolver gun, manually operated. The design idea was impractical, far ahead of what 18th century technology could achieve.

During the 19th century, Elisha Collier and later Samuel Colt used the revolver action to revolutionize handguns.

William A. Alexander of Mobile, Alabama, invented a Rapid Firing Cannon Gun made from a design by Captain Weingard, both of whom also helped build the submarine H.L. Hunley. The gun was the prototype for the Gatling gun. It was made in Mobile and was first used in the defense of the city. When the Confederate States of America had to evacuate Mobile, the weapon was placed on the ship Magnolia to be transported for use upriver. Union forces were closing in on the ship so to prevent its capture, it was pushed overboard into the river. Union forces discovered the gun underwater and recovered it. In 1864 Alexander was called back to Mobile from Charleston, South Carolina, to build one of his Rapid Firing Guns.

The Confederate States used a single 2-inch, 5-shot revolver cannon with manually rotated chambers during the Siege of Petersburg. The gun was captured in Danville, Virginia by Union forces on April 27, 1865.

The Hotchkiss revolving cannon of the late 19th century was not a revolver cannon in the modern sense but was rather a rotary cannon, with multiple barrels allowing for feeding and extraction operations in parallel in different barrels.

In 1905, C. M. Clarke patented the first fully automatic, gas-operated rotary chamber gun, but his design was ignored at the time. Clarke's patent came as reciprocating-action automatic weapons like the Maxim gun and the Browning gun were peaking in popularity.

In 1932, the Soviet ShKAS machine gun, 7.62 mm caliber aircraft ordnance used a twelve-round capacity, revolver-style feed mechanism with a single barrel and single chamber, to achieve firing rates of well over 1,800 rounds per minute, and as high as 3,000 rounds per minute in special test versions in 1939, all operating from internal gas-operated reloading. Some 150,000 ShKAS weapons were produced for arming Soviet military aircraft through 1945.

Around 1935, Silin, Berezin and Morozenko worked on a 6,000 rpm 7.62 mm aircraft machine gun using revolver design, called SIBEMAS (СИБЕМАС), but this was abandoned.

=== Modern ===
It was not until the mid-1940s that the first practical revolver cannon emerged.

The archetypal revolver cannon is the Mauser MK 213 from World War II, from which almost all current weapons are derived. However, various problems, such as only moderate improvements in rate of fire and muzzle velocity, coupled with excessive barrel wear, and the effects of the Allied bombing campaign against German industry, meant that at the end of the war only five prototypes (V1 to V5) of either 20 mm MG 213 or 30 mm MK 213 were finished. In the immediate post-war era the unfinished weapon, and the engineers who worked on it, were seized by the Allies to continue development; Both the British and French worked on the 30 mm versions of the MK 213, producing the ADEN and DEFA, respectively. Switzerland produced the Oerlikon KCA. The American M39 cannon used the 20 mm version, re-chambered for a slightly longer 102 mm cartridge, intermediate between the MK 213's 82 mm and Hispano-Suiza HS.404's 110 mm case lengths. Several generations of the basic ADEN/DEFA weapons followed, remaining largely unchanged into the 1970s.

Around that time, a new generation of weapons developed, based on the proposed NATO 25 mm caliber standard and the Mauser 27 mm round. A leading example is the Mauser BK-27. In the 1980s, the French developed the GIAT 30, a newer generation power-driven revolver cannon. The Rheinmetall RMK30 modifies the GIAT system further, by venting the gas to the rear to eliminate recoil.

Larger experimental weapons have also been developed for anti-aircraft use, like the Anglo-Swiss twin barrel but single chamber 42 mm Oerlikon RK 421 given the code name "Red King" and the related single-barrel "Red Queen" - all of which were cancelled during development. The largest to see service is the Rheinmetall Millennium 35 mm Naval Gun System.

Soviet revolver cannon are less common than Western ones, especially on aircraft. A mechanism for a Soviet revolver-based machine gun was patented in 1944. The virtually unknown Rikhter R-23 was fitted only to some Tu-22 models, but later abandoned in favor of the two-barrel, Gast gun Gryazev-Shipunov GSh-23 in the Tu-22M. The Rikhter R-23 does have the distinction of being fired from the space station Salyut 3. The Soviet navy has also adopted a revolver design, the NN-30, typically in a dual mount in the AK-230 turret.

== Characteristics ==
With a single barrel mated to a cylinder with multiple chambers, this type of autocannon uses the revolver principle to accelerate the cycle of loading, firing and ejecting multiple rounds of ammunition, achieving a very high rate of fire compared to conventional cannon of the same calibre.

=== Compared to rotary autocannon ===
Automatic revolver cannons generally have a lower maximum sustained rate of fire than that of rotary cannons because their barrel suffers from much higher heating loads, as it alone must fire every round. Rotary autocannons are capable of a rate of fire of up to 10,000 rounds per minute (such as the Gryazev-Shipunov GSh-6-23), while revolver cannons are capable of a rate of fire of up to 2,500 rounds per minute (such as the GIAT 30). However, revolver cannons are generally able to be made much lighter than rotary autocannons, requiring less support and mounting hardware—rotary autocannons spin the whole multiple barrel and breech assembly, which, in equal caliber versions, can weigh hundreds of kilograms more in comparison (though the weight per rounds fired per minute is lower for the rotary). The firing rate of a rotary autocannon is directly related to the rotational speed of the barrel cluster. The need to accelerate this cluster generally requiring a large, external power supply means that the maximum attainable rate of fire is not immediately available. In addition, rotaries suffer from lower accuracy, due to dispersion caused by multiple barrels rotating at a varying speed. As a result of their design, revolver cannons do not suffer from these issues.

== Examples ==
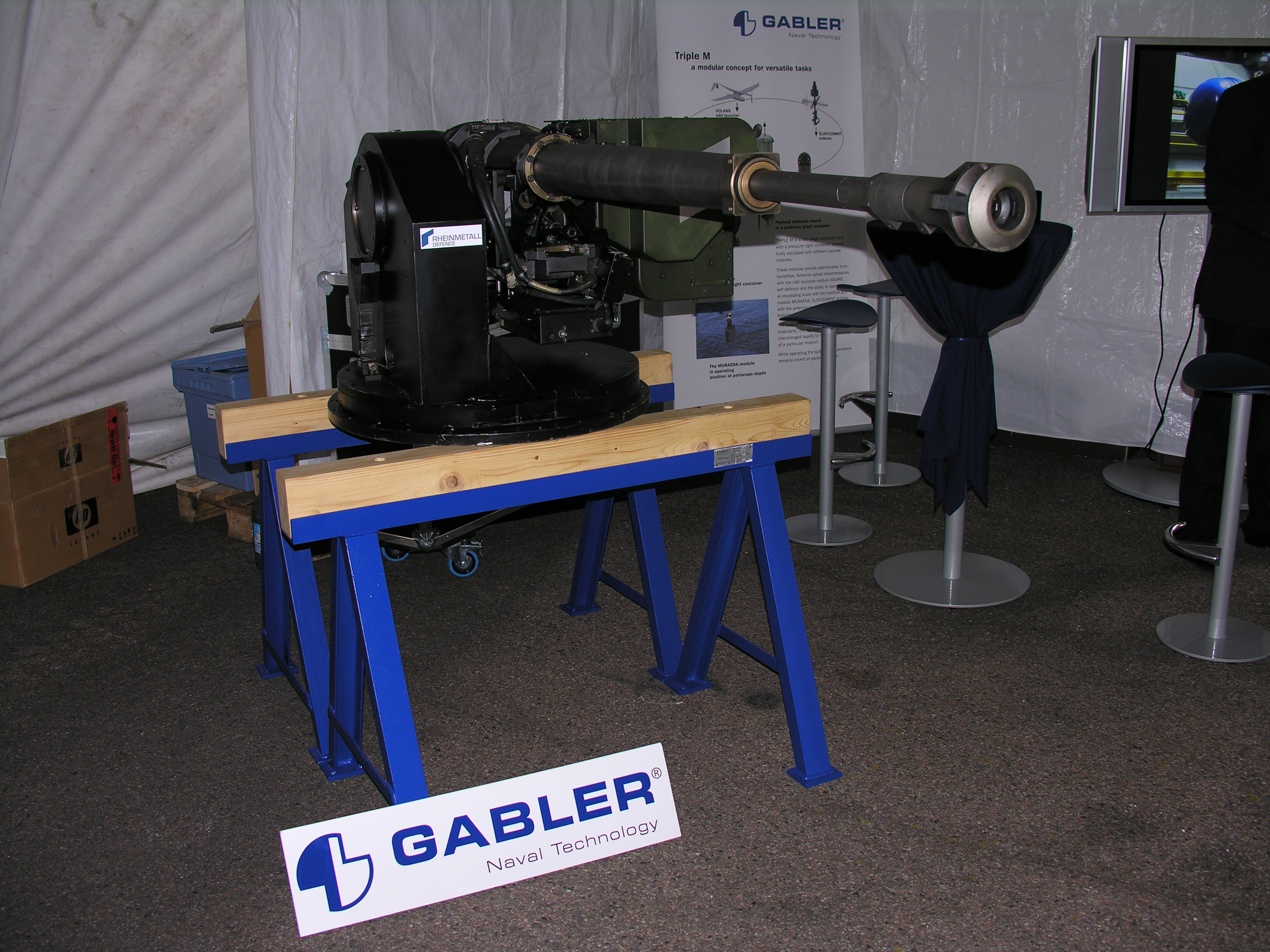
Rheinmetall RMK30 (TechDemo 2008 exhibition)

- ADEN cannon
- DEFA cannon
- GIAT 30
- M39 cannon
- Mauser BK-27
- Mauser MK 213
- Oerlikon KCA
- Rheinmetall Oerlikon Millennium Gun
- Rheinmetall RMK30
- Rikhter R-23

== See also ==
- MANTIS
- ShVAK cannon
- ShKAS machine gun
- Skyshield
