= Rikhter R-23 =

R-23 Aircraft Cannon
- Type: Single-barrel revolver cannon
- Place of origin: Soviet Union

Service history
- Used by: Soviet Union, Russia

Production history
- Designer: Aron Abramovich Rikhter
- Designed: 1964
- Manufacturer: Tulamashzavod, Tula
- No. built: 500+

Specifications
- Mass: 58.5 kg (129 lb)
- Length: 1,468 mm (4 ft 10 in)
- Barrel length: approx. 1,140 mm (45 in) barrel length
- Width: 170 mm (7 in)
- Height: 165 mm (6 in)
- Cartridge: 23 x 260 mm reverse chambered telescoped ammunition
- Caliber: 23 mm (0.91 in)
- Barrels: 1
- Action: gas operated four-chamber revolver
- Rate of fire: 2,500 rpm
- Muzzle velocity: 850 m/s (2,800 ft/s)
- Feed system: belt

The Rikhter R-23 is an aircraft autocannon developed for the Soviet Air Force starting in the late 1950s. It was designed to be as short as possible to avoid problems found on high-speed aircraft when the guns were pointed into the airstream. The R-23 was a gas operated revolver cannon that used gas bled from holes in the barrel to provide the motive force. Firing up to 2,500 rpm, the R-23 was the fastest firing single-barrel cannon ever introduced into service.

The R-23 took some time to develop and was not used operationally until 1964. It was used only in the tail turret of the Tu-22, and experimentally on the Salyut 3 space station. Its role was taken over by the twin-barrel Gryazev-Shipunov GSh-23.

A modified version of the weapon was the only cannon to have been fired in space.

== Development ==
In the late 1940s and the early 1950s tests with defensive bomber turret cannons resulted in problems caused by the air flow affecting the weapons' barrel. Among these were the widely used Nudelman-Rikhter NR-23, found in many bomber installations, with barrels that extended far past their mounting points. A contest for a new design that was much shorter led to entries from Aron Abramovich Rikhter at A.E. Nudelman's OKB-16 in Moscow, and a competing design from Igor Dmitriev's TsKB-14 in Tula.

Rikhter's design was radical; he selected a revolver cannon layout, but chose a front-loading design where the rounds were fed rearward into the revolver chambers. This allowed the feed mechanism to be placed in front of the rotating block, under the barrel. This created a gun with shorter overall length, and greatly improved the balance, with the center of gravity almost directly under the middle of the barrel. Despite some initial problems, the first 261-P prototype cannon was produced in 1957. On 7 August 1964 the cannon was adopted and received the official designation R-23. By this time the competing design from TsKB-14 had also been put into production as the Afanasev Makarov AM-23.

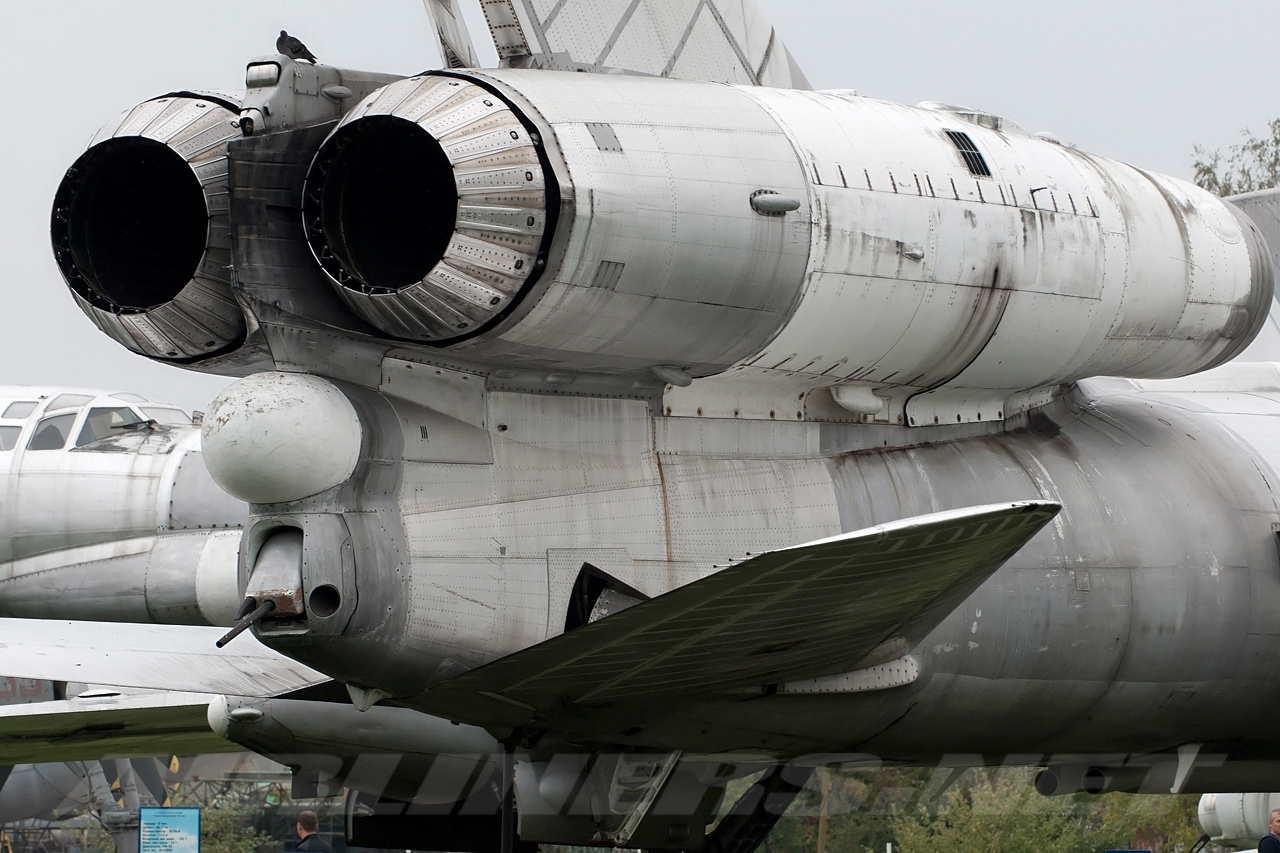
R-23 in a Tu-22PD tail turret, with the 'Argon' radome above it.

The R-23 is installed in the DK-20 tail turret of the "A", "B", "K" and "R" versions of the Tu-22 bomber only. The hydraulically elevated and traversed DK-20 turret uses the "Krypton" radar sight and TP-1 or TP-1A television sights. Spent cartridge cases are ejected outside the aircraft. The DK-20 turret weighs 593 kg (1,307 lb) including the R-23 cannon and 500 rounds of ammunition.

A subsequent application found the cannon in the Soviet space program. It was mounted on the military space station Almaz Salyut 3 (also known as OPS-2) as a self-defence weapon. At the end of the mission, when the station flew unmanned, it was tested and successfully fired. This "space cannon" had a supply of 32 rounds.

== Mechanism ==
The 23 mm R-23 is a gas-operated revolver cannon. The revolving cylinder has four cartridge chambers. Three separate gas systems are used; one ejects the fired cartridge case from the chamber, another chambers a fresh round, and the last drives the revolver cylinder and the feed mechanism.

In most gun designs, rounds are fed from the rear and rammed forward into the chamber. This leads to the traditional cartridge layout with the bullet or shell at the front, and a tapering cylindrical casing behind it. As the round is pushed forward, the tapering shape of the bullet and casing guides it into the center of the chamber. Rikhter's 261P design did the opposite, feeding the round rearward. To accomplish this, GSKB-398 (now GNPP PRIBOR) designed a round with the bullet completely enclosed in a galvanized steel casing, which was tapered to a bullet-like ogee at the rear and tipped by the electrically-fired primer. The front of the round was open, with the tip of the shell even with the end of the opening. The shell was held into the case by heavy crimping near the end of the shell.

The ammunition is fed from the right side only and consists of a belt that contains the cartridges in disintegrating belt links. The latter drop out on the left side of the receiver. Fired cases are ejected forwards on the right side of the receiver.

The R-23 cannon has an automatic charging mechanism that fires the cannon in case of a misfire. When one of the two pyrotechnical cartridges is fired, a small bolt inside that cartridge is accelerated to penetrate the side wall of the R-23 cartridge. The hot propellant gases of the pyrotechnical cartridge follow the bolt into the dud R-23 cartridge and ignite the propellant charge to fire the round. This unique and curious mechanism was used in the R-23 cannon for the first time. The same kind of mechanism with a single pyrotechnical cartridge was later incorporated into the 30 mm GSh-30-1 aircraft cannon.

== Secrecy ==
The R-23 cannon and its unique telescoped ammunition remained a military secret for a long time. This can be partially explained by the fact that the R-23 cannon was used in outer space, arming Salyut 3. The R-23 cannon was known only in the Soviet Union until the Tu-22 bomber was exported to Iraq and Libya during the 1970s. Various customers in the Middle East were the first outside the Soviet Union to learn about the R-23.

The Israeli army had discovered the 23 mm ammunition without knowing what kind of weapon it was for. During the Israeli occupation of South Lebanon from June 1982 to June 1985, the Israeli army captured a crate of R-23 ammunition. This crate was delivered by mistake within a shipment of Soviet 23 mm cartridges for the ZSU-23-4. This anti-aircraft ammunition was originally shipped to Syria and ended up in Lebanon, where it was found by the Israeli army.

The first examination of the gun by Western forces took place in 1987 when French bomb disposal personnel were called in to clear the wreckage of a Libyan Tu-22B shot down over Chad by a French MIM-23 Hawk battery.

== Ammunition specifications ==
- Cartridge dimensions: caliber 23×260 mm (telescoped) with a steel case
- Projectile weight: 175 grams (6.2 oz)
- Propellant charge: 67 grams (2.4 oz) of 4/7fl VBP smokeless powder
- Types of ammunition: HEI (nose fuzed), HEI (base fuzed), TP airburst, TP (inert)

== See also ==
- Here Is the Soviet Union's Secret Space Cannon (R-23M Kartech)
