= List of aircraft weapons =

This is a list of weapons (aircraft ordnance) carried by aircraft.

== Guns ==
In World War I, aircraft were initially intended for aerial reconnaissance, however some pilots began to carry rifles in case they spotted enemy planes. Soon, planes were fitted with machine guns with a variety of mountings; initially the only guns were carried in the rear cockpit supplying defensive fire (this was employed by two-seat aircraft all through the war). Seeing a need for offensive fire, forward-firing weapons were devised. The Airco DH.2 pusher plane had its gun in the front while the engine was in the back, some experimented with mountings on the (side) wing or on the biplane's upper wing (above the cockpit), until by 1916 most fighter aircraft mounted their guns in the forward fuselage using a synchronization gear so that the bullets did not strike the propeller.

In World War II, fighter aircraft carried machine guns and cannons mounted in the wings, engine cowlings, nose, or between the banks of the engine, firing through the propeller spinner. Night fighters sometimes utilized guns firing upwards as well. Bombers typically carried from one to 14 flexible machine guns and/or autocannons as defensive armament, while certain types added fixed offensive guns as well.

While missiles have been the primary armament since the early 1960s, the Vietnam War showed that guns still had a role to play and most fighters built since then are fitted with cannons (typically between 20 and 30 mm in caliber) as an adjunct to missiles. Modern European fighter aircraft are usually equipped with the revolver cannon, whereas the United States and to some extent Russia generally favor the Gatling gun. The Gatling gun quickly became the weapon of choice for most air forces.

- ADEN cannon (UK)
- 20 mm Becker (Germany)
- Berezin B-20 (USSR)
- Berezin BS (USSR)
- Berezin UB (USSR)
- 40 mm gun (Sweden)
- Bofors m/45 (Sweden)
- Bofors m/47 (Sweden)
- Bofors m/49 (Sweden)
- Bordkanone BK 3,7 cannon (37mm, a.k.a. 3,7 cm) (Germany)
- Bordkanone BK 5 cannon (50mm, a.k.a. 5 cm) (Germany)
- Bordkanone BK 7,5 cannon (75mm a.k.a. 7,5 cm) (Germany)
- Breda-SAFAT machine gun (Italy)
- Browning Model 1919 machine gun (United States)
- Colt Mk 12 cannon (United States)
- COW 37 mm gun (UK)
- DEFA cannon (France)
- FN Browning machine gun (Belgium)
- GAU-7 cannon (United States)
- GAU-8 Avenger (United States)
- GAU-12 Equalizer (United States)
- GIAT 30 (France)
- Gryazev-Shipunov GSh-23L (Russia)
- Gryazev-Shipunov GSh-6-23 (Russia)
- Gryazev-Shipunov GSh-6-30 (Russia)
- Gryazev-Shipunov/Izhmash GSh-30-1 (Russia)
- Gryazev-Shipunov GSh-30-2 (Russia)
- Hispano 20 mm cannon (Switzerland)
- Ho-1/Ho-3 cannon (20mm) (Japan)
- Ho-5 cannon (20mm)(Japanese army)
- Ho-103 machine gun (12.7mm) (Japan)
- Ho-155 cannon (30mm), (Japan)
- Ho-203 cannon (37mm) (Japan)
- Ho-204 cannon (37mm) (Japan)
- Ho-301 cannon (caseless 40mm) (Japan)
- Ho-401 cannon (57mm) (Japan)
- Ho-402 cannon (57mm) Japan)
- Karabin maszynowy obserwatora wz.37 (Poland)
- Ksp m/22 (Sweden)
- Lewis gun (USA/UK)
- M2 Browning machine gun (United States)
- M4 cannon (United States)
- M39 cannon (United States)
- M61 Vulcan (United States)
- M134 Minigun (United States)
- M197 Gatling gun (United States)
- MAC 1934 (France)
- Mauser BK-27 (Germany)
- MG 08 (Germany)
- MG 15 machine gun (Germany)
- MG 17 machine gun (Germany)
- MG 131 machine gun (Germany)
- MG 151 cannon (Germany)
- MG FF cannon (Germany)
- MK 103 cannon (Germany)
- MK 108 cannon (Germany)
- Nudelman-Suranov NS-23 (Russia)
- Schwarzlose MG M.07/12 (Austria-Hungary)
- Shipunov 2A42 (Russia)
- ShKAS machine gun (Russia)
- ShVAK cannon (Russia)
- Oerlikon KCA (Switzerland)
- Ordnance QF 6-pounder(DH Mosquito 57mm anti-submarine gun) (UK)
- Parabellum MG14 (Germany)
- Spandau machine gun (Germany)
- Semi Automatique Moteur Canon d'aviation (37mm) (France)
- 75 mm gun (US) (T13E1 / M5) (United States)
- Type 1 machine gun (7.92mm)(Japan)
- Type 2 cannon (30mm) (Japan)
- Type 2 machine gun (13mm) (Japan)
- Type 3 machine gun (13.2mm) (Japan)
- Type 5 cannon (30mm) (Japanese navy)
- Type 88 cannon (75mm) (Japan)
- Type 89 machine gun (7.7mm) (Japan)
- Type 92 machine gun (7.7mm) (Japan)
- Type 97 machine gun (7.7mm) (Japan)
- Type 98 machine gun (7.92mm) (Japan)
- Type 99 cannon (20mm) (Japan)
- 1.59 inch Breech-Loading Vickers Q.F. Gun, Mk II ("Vickers-Crayford rocket gun") (UK)
- Vickers machine gun (UK)
- Vickers K machine gun (UK)
- Vickers S (UK)
- Volkov-Yartsev VYa-23 (USSR)

== Air-dropped bombs ==
- AASM (France)
- AN-22 bomb (France)
- AN-52 bomb (French tactical nuclear bomb)
- B28 nuclear bomb See Mark 28 nuclear bomb
- B39 nuclear bomb (USA)
- B41 nuclear bomb (USA)
- B43 nuclear bomb (USA)
- B46 nuclear bomb (USA)
- B53 nuclear bomb (USA)
- B57 nuclear bomb (USA)
- B61 nuclear bomb (USA)
- B90 nuclear bomb See Mark 90 Betty nuclear depth bomb (USA)
- Daisy cutter (BLU-82B)
- BLU-107 Durandal (USA)
- BLU-109 (USA)
- BLU-114/B "Soft-Bomb"
- BLU-116 (USA)
- Blue Danube (nuclear weapon) (UK)
- Fritz X
- GBU-10 Paveway 2000 lbs (USA)
- GBU-12 Paveway 500 lbs (USA)
- GBU-15 (USA)
- EGBU-15
- GBU-24 Paveway III (USA)
- GBU-28 (USA)
- GBU-57A/B MOP (USA)
- HGK (Hassas Gudum Kiti - Precision Guidance Kit) Turkey
- HOPE/HOSBO
- Joint Direct Attack Munition (JDAM) (USA)
- Joint Standoff Weapon (JSOW) (USA)
- Mark 2 nuclear bomb (USA)
- Mark 4 nuclear bomb (USA)
- Mark 5 nuclear bomb (USA)
- Mark 6 nuclear bomb (USA)
- Mark 7 nuclear bomb (USA)
- Mark 8 nuclear bomb (USA)
- Mark 10 nuclear bomb (USA)
- Mark 11 nuclear bomb (USA)
- Mark 12 nuclear bomb (USA)
- Mark 15 nuclear bomb (USA)
- Mark 15/39 nuclear bomb (USA)
- Mark 18 nuclear bomb (USA)
- Mark 24 nuclear bomb (USA)
- Mark 28 nuclear bomb (USA)
- Mark 36 nuclear bomb (USA)
- Mark 77 bomb incendiary bomb (USA)
- Mark 81 bomb (USA)
- Mark 82 bomb (USA)
- Mark 83 bomb (USA)
- Mark 84 bomb (USA)
- Mark 90 Betty nuclear depth bomb
- Mark 101 NDB (nuclear depth bomb)
- Mark 105 Hotpoint bomb U.S. Navy tactical laydown bomb.
- Massive Ordnance Air Blast bomb (USA)
- Matra Durandal (France)
- Flechette (WWI)
- Ranken dart (World War I British)
- Blockbuster bomb (World War II British, also known as "cookies")
- Bouncing bomb (World War II British)
- SC250 bomb (World War II Germany)
- Tallboy bomb (World War II British, "earthquake bomb")
- Grand Slam bomb (World War II British, "earthquake" bomb)
- T-12 Cloud Maker (44,000 lb U.S. development of the Grand Slam bomb)
- Butterfly bomb
- Blue Rosette (UK strategic nuclear bomb for a supersonic bomber)
- Red Beard (nuclear weapon) (UK tactical nuclear bomb)
- Violet Club (UK emergency capability strategic nuclear bomb)
- Interim Megaton Weapon (UK emergency capability strategic nuclear bomb)
- WE.177A (UK dual-purpose tactical nuclear bomb and nuclear depth bomb)
- WE.177B (UK strategic nuclear bomb)
- WE.177C (UK tactical nuclear bomb)
- Yellow Sun Mk.1 (UK strategic nuclear bomb)
- Yellow Sun Mk.2 (UK strategic nuclear bomb)

== Air-launched missiles ==
- AGM-28 Hound Dog (USA)
- AGM-65 Maverick (USA)
- AGM-69 SRAM (USA)
- AGM-84 Harpoon (A-D See SLAM) (United States)
- AGM-86 ALCM (USA)
- AGM-88 HARM (USA)
- AGM-114 Hellfire (USA)
- AGM-122 Sidearm (USA)
- AGM-129 Advanced Cruise Missile (USA)
- AGM-130 (USA)
- AGM-142 Raptor (USA)
- AGM-154 JSOW (USA)
- AGM-158 JASSM (USA)
- AIM-4 Falcon (USA)
- AIM-7 Sparrow (USA)
- AIM-9 Sidewinder (USA)
- AIM-47 Falcon (USA)
- AIM-54 Phoenix (USA)
- AIM-120 AMRAAM (USA)
- AIM-132 ASRAAM (UK)
- Air-Sol Moyenne Portée (France)
- ALARM (UK)
- AS.34 Kormoran (Germany)
- Astra BVRAAM (India)
- Barq (Pakistan)
- BGM-71 TOW (USA)
- Blue Steel missile (UK)
- Fairey Fireflash (UK)
- Fairey Firestreak (UK)
- FIM-92 Stinger (ATAS version)
- Hawker Siddeley Red Top (UK)
- HJ-8 (China)
- HJ-9 (China)
- HJ-10 (China)
- IRIS-T (Germany)
- MBDA Exocet (France)
- MBDA Meteor (Europe)
- MBDA MICA (Europe)
- MBDA Magic II (France)
- PARS 3 LR (Germany)
- PL-9 (China)
- PL-10 (China)
- PL-12 (China)
- PL-15 (China)
- PL-21 (China)
- Kongsberg Penguin (AGM-119) (Norway)
- R550 Magic (France)
- R-73 AA-11 Archer (Russia)
- Raduga KS-1 Komet (Russia)
- Rafael Python series (Israel)
- RB 04 (Sweden)
- Rb 05 (Sweden)
- RBS-15 (Sweden)
- Red Dean (UK)
- Red Hebe
- Red Top (UK)
- Silkworm (China)
- Skybolt ALBM (USA)
- Skyflash (UK)
- Standoff Land Attack Missile (SLAM AGM-84E, H, K) (United States)
- Storm Shadow (UK)
- Super 530 (France)
- Taurus KEPD 350 (Germany)
- Vympel K-13 (Russia)
- Vympel R-23 (Russia)
- Vympel R-27 (Russia)
- Vympel R-33 (Russia)
- Vympel R-37 (Russia)
- Vympel R-73 (Russia)
- Vympel R-77 (Russia)
- X-4 missile (Germany WW2)
- YJ-82 (China)

== Air-launched rockets ==
- AIR-2 Genie(USA)
- Hydra 70 (USA)
- HVAR rocket (USA)
- CRV7 (Canada)
- Le Prieur rocket (France)
- R4M rocket (Germany)
- RP-3 (UK)
- RS-82, RS-132, M-8, M-13 (Russia)
- SNEB 68 mm rocket projectile (France)
- Oerlikon SNORA and SURA-D type rockets
- S-5 rocket (Russia)
- S-8 rocket (Russia)
- S-13 rocket (Russia)
- S-24 rocket (Russia)
- S-25 rocket (Russia)

== Air-launched torpedoes ==
- Mark 44 torpedo (USA)
- Mark 46 torpedo (USA)
- Stingray torpedo (UK)
- Pentane torpedo (UK)
- MU90 Impact (EU)
- Type 91 torpedo (WW II Japan)

== See also ==
- Weapons
- Firearms
- List of firearms
- WW2 Luftwaffe aircraft weapons
