= List of weapons of World War II Japanese aircraft =

This is a complete list of weapons deployed on Japanese combat aircraft during the Second World War.

== Army aircraft ==
=== Machine guns ===
- Type 89 7.7 mm machine gun (copy of Vickers Class E)
- Ho-103 12.7 mm machine gun (based on Browning M1921)

=== Cannons ===
- Mauser MG 151/20 20 mm cannon
- Ho-1 20 mm cannon
- Ho-3 20 mm cannon
- Ho-5 20 mm cannon (based on Browning)
- Ho-155 cannon (a.k.a. Ho-105) 30 mm cannon (based on Browning)
- Ho-155-II 30mm cannon
- Ho-203 37 mm cannon
- Ho-204 37 mm cannon (based on Browning)
- Ho-301 40 mm cannon (caseless ammunition, sometimes considered a "rocket launcher")
- Ho-401 57 mm cannon
- Ho-402 57 mm cannon
- Type 88 75 mm cannon

=== Bombs ===
The Japanese army used a number of different types of bombs during World War II, ranging from 15 to 500 kilograms.

=== Rear armament (for defensive use) ===
- Type 89 7.7 mm machine gun (based on Type 11)
- Type 98 7.92 mm machine gun (copy of MG 15)
- Ho-104 12.7 mm machine gun (based on Browning M1921)

=== Combat head (for special use) ===
- Combat head of 800 kg
- Combat head of 2,900 kg
- Combat head of 6,393 lbs (thermite bomb)

== Navy aircraft ==
=== Machine guns ===
- Type 92 7.7 mm machine gun (British Lewis)
- Type 97 7.7 mm machine gun (Vickers)
- Type 3 13.2 mm machine gun (Browning with Hotchkiss 13.2mm cartridge)

=== Cannons ===
- Type 99 cannon 20 mm cannon (Oerlikon FF)
- Type 2 30 mm cannon
- Type 5 30 mm cannon

=== Rear armament (for defensive use) ===
- Type 92 7.7 mm machine gun (British Lewis)
- Type 1 7.92 mm machine gun (German MG 15)
- Type 2 13 mm machine gun (German MG 131)
- Type 99-1/Type 99-2 20 mm cannon (Oerlikon FF)

== See also ==
- List of Japanese military equipment of World War II
- List of weapons of military aircraft of Germany during World War II
