= Kawasaki Ki-96 =

Japanese WWII fighter aircraft

Ki-96
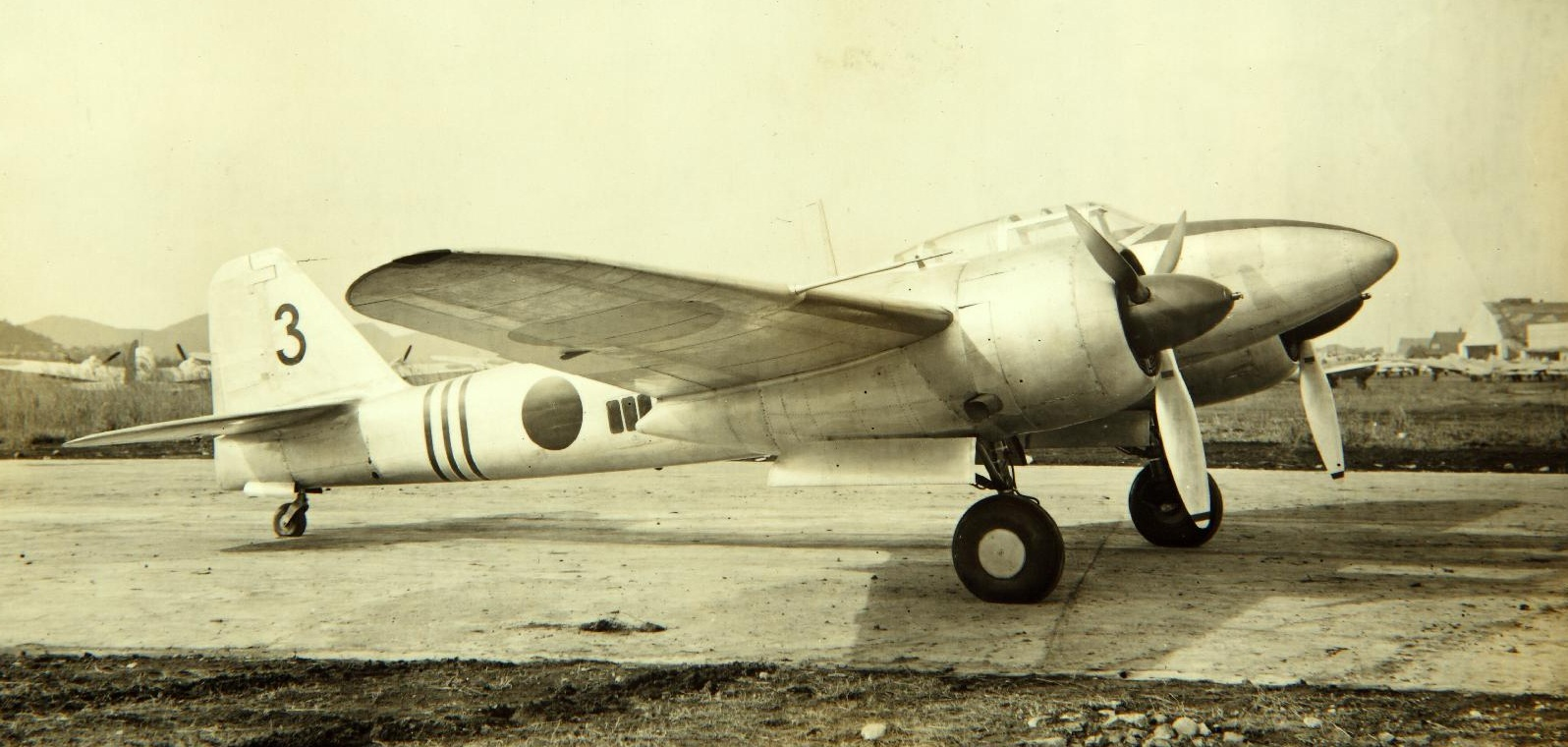

General information
- Type: Twin engine heavy fighter
- National origin: Japan
- Manufacturer: Kawasaki Kōkūki Kōgyō K.K.
- Number built: 3

History
- First flight: September 1943
- Developed from: Kawasaki Ki-45
- Developed into: Kawasaki Ki-102

The Kawasaki Ki-96 was a Japanese single seat, twin-engine heavy fighter of World War II. It was intended to replace the Kawasaki Ki-45s of the Imperial Japanese Army Air Service. However, it was not adopted, and only three prototypes were built.

== Design and development ==
The success of the Kawasaki Ki-45 led Kawasaki to start development of an evolved version, on Kawasaki's own authority, in August 1942. Like the Ki-45, the proposed design was a two-seat, twin-engine fighter but larger and using more powerful engines. In December 1942, the Koku Hombu (Imperial Japanese Army Aviation Bureau) showed interest but asked Kawasaki to complete the aircraft as single-seat fighters. The first prototype, which was converted while being produced and which retained the larger cockpit canopy intended for the two-seater, flew in September 1943. The two remaining prototypes were built from the start as single-seaters and were fitted with a smaller canopy.

Despite demonstrating performance exceeding estimates and excellent handling, the Army's requirements had changed back to a two-seat fighter, so further development of the Ki-96 was stopped. The wings and tail unit of the Ki-96 would however form part of the structure of the Ki-102 two-seat fighter.

== Specifications (Kawasaki Ki-96) ==
Data from War Planes of the Second World War - Fighters - Vol. 3; WW2 Aircraft Fact Files: Japanese Army Fighters, Part 1; Japanese Aircraft of the Pacific War

General characteristics

- Crew: 1
- Length: 11.45 m (37 ft 7 in)
- Wingspan: 15.57 m (51 ft 1 in)
- Height: 3.7 m (12 ft 2 in)
- Wing area: 34 m^{2} (370 sq ft)
- Airfoil: root: NACA 24015; tip: NACA 23010
- Empty weight: 4,550 kg (10,031 lb)
- Gross weight: 6,000 kg (13,228 lb)
- Powerplant: 2 × Mitsubishi Ha112-II 14-cylinder air-cooled radial engines, 1,125 kW (1,509 hp) each
- Propellers: 3-bladed constant-speed propellers

Performance

- Maximum speed: 600 km/h (370 mph, 320 kn) at 6,000 m (20,000 ft)
- Ferry range: 1,600 km (990 mi, 860 nmi)
- Service ceiling: 11,500 m (37,700 ft)
- Time to altitude: 6,000 m (20,000 ft) in 6 minutes
- Power/mass: 0.38 kW/kg (0.23 hp/lb)

Armament

- Guns: 1 × 37 mm (1.46 in) Ho-203 cannon, 2 × 20 mm (0.79 in) Ho-5 cannon.

== See also ==
Related development

- Kawasaki Ki-45
- Kawasaki Ki-102

Aircraft of comparable role, configuration, and era

- Nakajima J5N
