= Warhead =

Section of a device that contains the explosive agent or toxic material

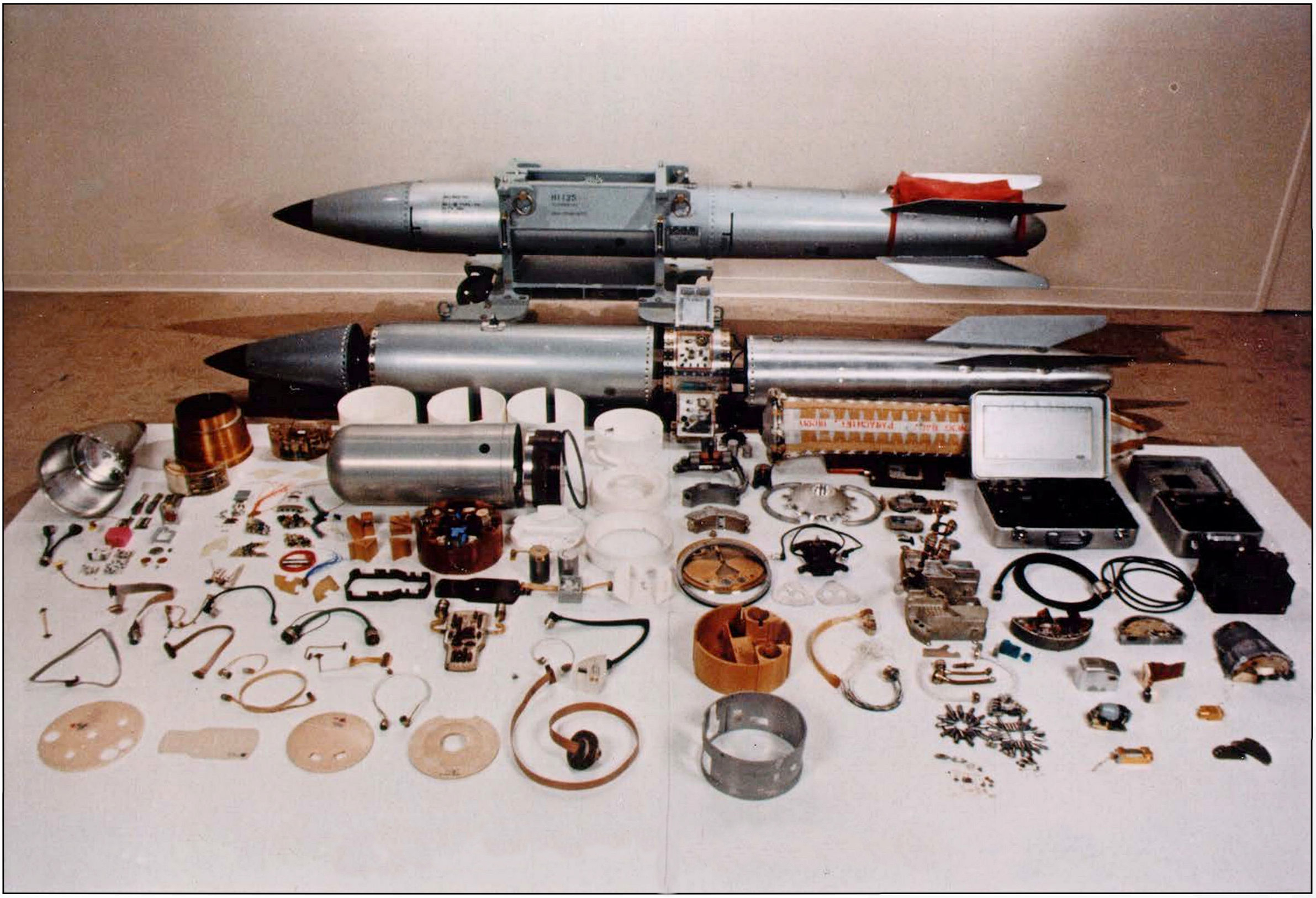
A B61 nuclear bomb in various stages of assembly; the nuclear warhead is the bullet-shaped silver canister in the middle-left of the photograph.

A warhead is the section of a device that contains the explosive agent or toxic (biological, chemical, or nuclear) material that is delivered by a missile, rocket, torpedo, or bomb.

== Classification ==
Types of warheads include:

- Explosive: An explosive charge is used to destroy the target and damage surrounding areas with a blast wave.
  - Conventional: Chemicals such as gunpowder and high explosives store significant energy within their molecular bonds. This energy can be released quickly by a trigger, such as an electric spark. Thermobaric weapons enhance the blast effect by utilizing the surrounding atmosphere in their explosive reactions.
    - Blast: A strong shock wave is provided by the detonation of the explosive.
    - Fragmentation: Metal fragments are projected at high velocity to cause damage or injury.
    - Continuous rod: Metal bars welded on their ends form a compact cylinder of interconnected rods, which is violently expanded into a contiguous zig-zag-shaped ring by an explosive detonation. The rapidly expanding ring produces a planar cutting effect that is devastating against military aircraft, which may be designed to be resistant to shrapnel.
    - Shaped charge: The effect of the explosive charge is focused onto a specially shaped metal liner to project a hypervelocity jet of metal, to perforate heavy armour.
      - Explosively formed penetrator: Instead of turning a thin metal liner into a focused jet, the detonation wave is directed against a concave metal plate at the front of the warhead, propelling it at high velocity while simultaneously deforming it into a projectile.
  - Nuclear: A runaway nuclear fission (fission bomb) or nuclear fusion (hydrogen bomb) reaction causes immense energy release.
- Incendiary: Produces a fire intended to ignite nearby materials.
- Chemical: A toxic chemical, such as poison gas or nerve gas, is dispersed, which is designed to injure or kill human beings.
- Biological: An infectious agent, such as anthrax spores, is dispersed, which is designed to sicken or kill humans.

Often, a biological or chemical warhead will use an explosive charge for rapid dispersal and enhanced damage.

== Detonators ==
Explosive warheads contain detonators to trigger the explosion.

Types of detonators include:

Type	Definition
Contact	When the warhead makes physical contact with the target, the explosive is detonated. Sometimes combined with a delay, to detonate a specific amount of time after contact.
Proximity	Using radar, sonar, a magnetic sensor, or a laser, the warhead is detonated when the target is within a specified distance. It is often coupled with directional explosion control system that ensures that the explosion sends the fragmentation primarily towards the target that triggered it.
Timed	Warhead is detonated after a specific amount of time.
Altitude	Warhead is detonated once it falls to a specified altitude, usually in an air burst.
Remote	Remotely detonated via signal from operator. (Not normally used for warheads except for self-destruction)
Combined	Any combination of the above.

== See also ==
- Guidance system
- List of aircraft weapons
- List of missiles
- Nuclear weapon yield
- Missile
