= Nakajima Ki-44 Shōki =

1940 fighter aircraft family by Nakajima

Ki-44 Shōki
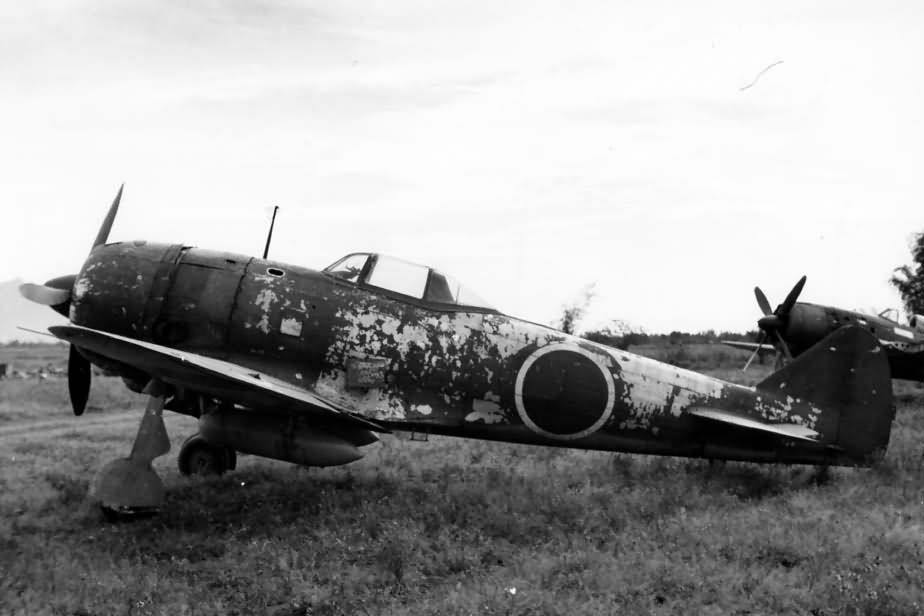

General information
- Type: Fighter
- National origin: Japan
- Manufacturer: Nakajima Aircraft Company
- Primary users: Imperial Japanese Army Air Service Manchukuo Air Force; Chinese Nationalist Air Force
- Number built: 1,225

History
- Manufactured: 1940–1944
- Introduction date: 1942
- First flight: August 1940
- Retired: 1946

The Nakajima Ki-44 Shōki (鍾馗, "Devil Queller") was a single-seat fighter-interceptor which was designed and produced by the Japanese aviation manufacturer Nakajima Aircraft Company. Operated by the Imperial Japanese Army (IJA) from 1942 to 1945 during World War II, its official designation was Army Type 2 Single-Seat Fighter (二式単座戦闘機) and its Allied reporting name was Tojo. The name Shōki refers to Zhong Kui (鍾馗), a Taoist deity in the Chinese mythology, traditionally regarded as a vanquisher of ghosts and evil beings.

The development of the Ki-44 was launched in 1939 as a dedicated heavy fighter aircraft. Performing its maiden flight in August 1940, the initial prototypes initially failed to attain the demanding airspeed requirement of 600 km/h (370 mph); a redesign effort centred around decreasing drag proved the aircraft could exceed this speed. The Ki-44 differed greatly from the typical Japanese fighters of the era, its design prioritising both speed and rate-of-climb in preference to maneuverability. In contrast to its predecessor, the lighter and nimbler Nakajima Ki-43, the Ki-44 was far less maneuverable and, as a consequence of its use of relatively small wings giving the aircraft a relatively high wing loading, possessed a higher landing speed, which many Japanese pilots disliked. These were concerns for pilots that were more use to more agile and responsive aircraft, such as the Ki-43 and the Ki-27. As a result, the Ki-44 was first restricted to pilots with at least 1,000 hours of flying time due to its tricky handling characteristics. However, it was later found that younger pilots who had not been instilled with the extensive aerobatic training of earlier cadres could manage the aircraft perfectly well, thus this restriction was removed.

The Ki-44 was the fastest climbing Japanese fighter upon its introduction. It was the only interceptor in IJA service when the B-29 Superfortresses flown by the United States Army Air Force (USAAF) began bombing the Japanese mainland in June 1944. While there were performance restrictions at high altitude, the aircraft was superior to the Ki-43 in that it was capable of matching Allied aircraft in both climbs and dives, which gave pilots more flexibility in combat and greater confidence than the Ki-43. The basic armament of four 12.7mm machine guns or two 12.7mm guns and two 20 mm cannons (or, in a few aircraft, two Ho-301 40mm cannons of limited range) was far more powerful than the older Ki-43's twin 12.7mm machine guns.

Production of the Ki-44 was terminated in late 1944 in favour of the more advanced Nakajima Ki-84, and when the war ended, only three sentai units were still equipped with them. Following the Surrender of Japan, several Ki-44s were captured and briefly operated by the Chinese Nationalist Air Force.

Out of all the examples produced, none survive today.

== Design and development ==
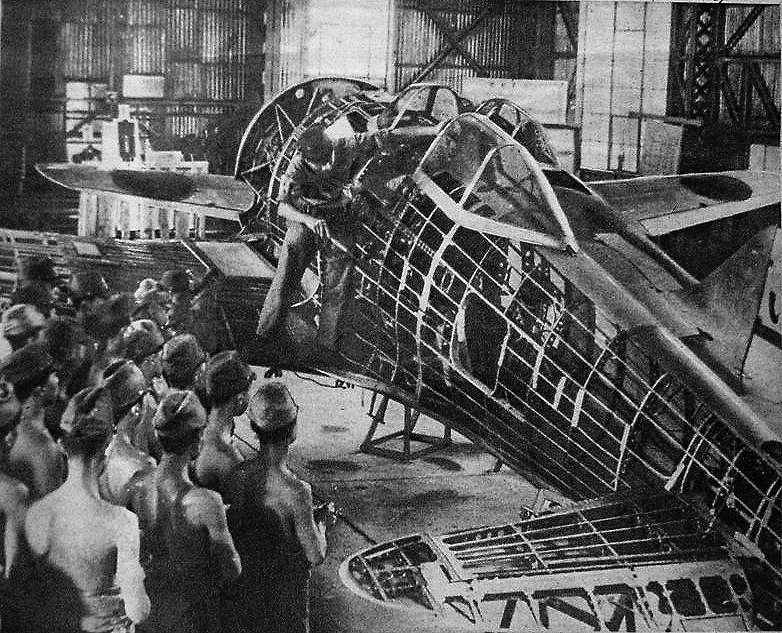
A Ki-44 at the Tokorozawa Army Maintenance School.

The origins of the Ki-44 can be traced back to 1939, shortly after the Nakajima Aircraft Company received the instruction to launch quantity production of the Nakajima Ki-43 Hayabusa fighter, the company was issued with a new specification by the Koku Hombu (Note: Koku Hombu was the Technical Branch of the Imperial Army Air Headquarters.) that called for a dedicated Interceptor aircraft. In contrast to conventional Japanese fighter performance preferences, emphasis was placed on both airspeed and rate of climb rather than maneuverability. Specific stipulations of the specification included a maximum speed of 600 km/h (370 mph) at 4,000 m (13,130 ft), with a climb-rate to attain such altitude from ground level within five minutes. The armament was also specified to include a pair of 7.7 mm (.303 in) along with a pair of 12.7 mm (.50 in) machine guns. These criteria were the result of a need for a heavy fighter aircraft that followed a more offensive doctrine; as such, the Ki-44 has often been referred to as an Air Defence Fighter.

Recognising that the then-standard Nakajima Ha-25 engine would not provide sufficient power to meet the performance required, Nakajima's design team instead selected the Nakajima Ha-41. (Note: The Ha-41 engine was a development of the Nakajima Ha-5) 14-cylinder double-row radial, originally intended for bomber aircraft. Although the Ha-41 was not the ideal choice due to its large-diameter cross section, the design team was able to marry this engine to a much smaller fuselage with a narrow cross section. At 1,260 mm in diameter, the Ha-41 was 126 mm larger in diameter than the 1,144 mm Nakajima Sakae (used in the Mitsubishi A6M "Zero" and Nakajima Ki-43 "Hayabusa".) However, this engine was only 27.8L in displacement and 1,000 hp, while the Ha-41 was 37.5L and produced 1,260 hp (1,440 hp in the later Ha-109 version). In any case, since the Ha-41 wasn't powerful enough, the only alternative available was the Mitsubishi Kinsei, which was slightly smaller than the Ha-41 in diameter, five liters smaller in displacement, and was less powerful. Unfortunately, this was already in demand for many other aircraft, so the Ha-41 was chosen as the best available powerplant.

In order to achieve its design goals, the wing area was relatively small leading to a high wing loading and a comparatively high landing speed that could be daunting to the average Japanese pilot, who was more used to aircraft with a low wing loading, such as the Ki-44's predecessors, the Ki-43 and Ki-27. To improve the aircraft's suitability as a gun platform, the fuselage possessed a relatively large side area while the fin and rudder were both mounted well aft of the horizontal tail surfaces. Possessing an all-metal structure, the Ki-44 was metal-skinned except for the control surfaces, which were fabric covered. A set of Ki-43-like "butterfly" combat flaps was fitted in order to improve its maneuverability.

In August 1940, the first prototype performed its maiden flight from Ojima Airfield; it was promptly followed by two further prototypes. Despite relatively high wing loading, initial test flights were considered to be encouraging, the aircraft's handling was considered to be acceptable even with the high wing loading necessitating a relatively high landing speed. One issue identified early on was the pilot's poor forward visibility during taxiing, caused by the large radial engine, although this was not an issue during flight. The prototypes did not satisfy during performance trials, where the aircraft was only capable of attaining 550 km/h (342 mph), raising the prospects of the Ki-44 being cancelled altogether. Modifications were made to improve performance, which included a more rigid engine mounting, changes to the cowling flaps, reshaping the intake for the supercharger, redesign of the firewall for increased engine cooling, and dispensing of five cooling vents on either side of the forward fuselage. Following these modifications, which substantially decreased drag, the prototype demonstrated its new ability to exceed the speed requirement, attaining a maximum speed of 626 km/h (360 mph).

An initial batch of seven pre-production aircraft were produced, the last of which was delivered in September 1941. These featured a revised two-section canopy, redesigned rudder, and provision for the installation of up to two underwing drop tanks. On 15 September 1941, all seven pre-production aircraft, along with two modified prototypes, were handed over to conduct service trials. Shortly thereafter, a second pre-production batch of 40 aircraft was ordered; these aircraft featured four 12.7mm machine guns, a relocated air cooler and main gear doors.

== Operational history ==
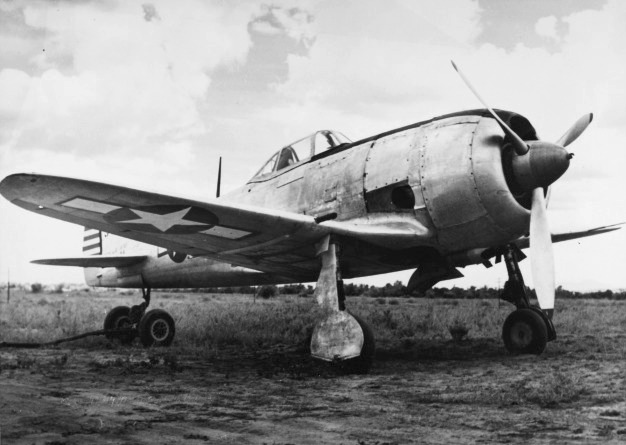
Captured Ki-44 with USAAF markings

The Nakajima Ki-44 at one point equipped 12 sentai ("groups/wings") of the Imperial Japanese Army Air Service: 9, 22, 23, 29, 47, 59, 64, 70, 85, 87, 104 and 246 Sentai. The Manchukuo Air Force also operated some Ki-44s.

In December 1941, the Ki-44 commenced operations following the delivery of nine aircraft to an experimental unit, 47th Chutai "Kawasemi Buntai" ("Kingfisher Flight, 47th Squadron"), commanded by Major Toshio Sakagawa and station at Saigon, Indochina. The Ki-44 would see significant action with 87th Sentai in the air defense role while based at Palembang, Sumatra, where oil fields considered vital to the Japanese war effort were located. Other units equipped with the Ki-44 during the early part of the conflict were stationed in China, Burma, the Philippines and Korea.

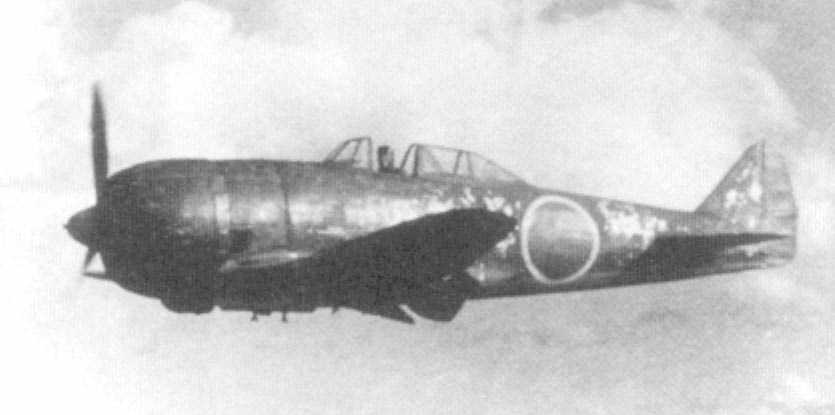
A Japanese Ki-44.

Later in the war, the type saw action in an air defense role over the home islands – mainly around Japan's large industrial cities. 47 Chutai, after it was transferred to air defense roles in Japan, was expanded to become 47 Sentai.

The Ki-44-II Otsu (also known as the Ki-44-IIb) could be armed with a Ho-301 40 mm autocannon. While this was a relatively high-caliber weapon, it used caseless ammunition with a low muzzle velocity and short range, which was effective only in close attacks. Some of these aircraft were used against USAAF bombers by a special Shinten Seiku Tai (air superiority unit), comprising at least four aircraft, that was part of 47th Sentai, based at Narimasu airfield in Tokyo. Pilots from such units attempted to shoot down B-29 Superfortresses and, once their ammunition was expended, to ram them – effectively a suicide attack. While the concept appeared straightforward, ramming a B-29 at high altitudes was difficult to achieve in practice.

By the end of the war, Ki-44 variants were being replaced by the Nakajima Ki-84 Hayate, which was regarded as vastly superior in aspects other than maintenance and reliability.

During 1946–49, both sides in the Chinese Civil War operated Ki-44s surrendered or abandoned by Japanese units. Air units of the People's Liberation Army obtained aircraft formerly belonging to 22 and 85 Sentai, which had disbanded in Chosen. Some of these aircraft were reportedly flown by Japanese veterans. Within the Republic of China Air Force, 18th Squadron (12th Fighter Group) was equipped with Ki-44s, formerly of 9th Sentai, which had disbanded in Nanking, and 29th Sentai, which had disbanded at Formosa Following the retreat of the Nationalists, the People's Liberation Army Air Force (formed in 1949) used the Ki-44 until the early 1950s.

=== Surviving aircraft ===
No complete surviving examples of the Ki-44 exist today. However, a wing center section is preserved at the Northwestern Polytechnical University Aviation Museum at Xi'an in China.

== Variants ==
Ki-44 Production: Ota Aircraft Plant
Year	Month	Aircraft Produced	Government Order
1940	August	1	pre-production
1940	September	1	pre-production
1940	October	1	pre-production
1941	June	1	
1941	July	4	
1941	August	1	
1940–1	Annual Production	9	9
1942	January	1	
1942	February	4	
1942	March	4	
1942	April	5	
1942	May	7	
1942	June	5	
1942	July	3	
1942	August	13	
1942	September	12	
1942	October	13	
1942	November	34	
1942	December	30	
1942	Annual Production	131	168
1943	January	30	
1943	February	33	
1943	March	42	
1943	April	37	
1943	May	37	
1943	June	40	
1943	July	30	
1943	August	51	
1943	September	51	
1943	October	47	
1943	November	56	
1943	December	65	
1943	Annual Production	519	506
1944	January	73	
1944	February	54	
1944	March	75	
1944	April	85	
1944	May	72	
1944	June	65	
1944	July	39	
1944	August	33	
1944	September	29	
1944	October	22	
1944	November	11	
1944	December	7	
1945	January	2	
1944–5	Annual Production	567	543
Total		1223	1223

Ki-44
First prototype (s/n 4401) with Ha-41 engine with a complex cooling system, unique for the first prototype.
Ki-44
Nine pre-production aircraft (s/n 4402-4410), the first of which were quite different than the later ones. These aircraft were used for combat evaluation with the 47th Independent Fighter Chutai at the start of the Pacific War. Their armament consisted of two 7.7 mm (.303 in) Type 89 machine guns in the nose and two 12.7 mm (.50 in) Ho-103 machine guns in the wings. Type 89 telescopic gunsight protruding through the windscreen. Provision for a single drop tank under the fuselage centre line or two drop tanks under the wings. Recognisable by their pointed spinner caps.
Ki-44-I
Powered by a 930 kW (1,250 hp) Nakajima Ha-41 engine with annular oil cooler, with a maximum speed of 580 km/h (363 mph). Armament and gunsight were unchanged from the pre-production models. Provision for two drop tanks under the wings. Rounded spinner caps with provision for Hucks starter. Late models had external fuel coolers. Forty produced (s/n 111-150).
Ki-44-II Ko (Ki-44-IIa)
Powered by a 1,074 kW (1,440 hp) Nakajima Ha-109 engine with external oil cooler and a top speed of 604 km/h (378 mph). Armament, gunsight and drop tank provision as for Ki-44-I. Rectangular cockpit access doors replaced the rounded version of earlier models. 355 produced (s/n 1001-1355).
Ki-44-II Otsu (Ki-44-IIb)
Standard armament reduced to just two 12.7 mm (.50 in) Ho-103 machine guns in the nose. Optional provision for two 40 mm (1.57 in) Ho-301 cannons in the wings. These were not always installed due to disappointing combat results and were sometimes replaced with two 12.7 mm (.50 in) Ho-103 machine guns. This variant retained the Type 89 telescopic gunsight as standard. 394 produced (s/n 1356-1749).
Ki-44-II Hei (Ki-44-IIc)
Standard armament of four 12.7 mm (.50 in) Ho-103 machine guns, two in the nose and two in the wings. Type 100 reflector gunsight mounted as standard. 427 produced (s/n 1750-2176).
Ki-44-III
A single prototype built, powered by a Ha-145 two-row 18-cylinder engine of 1,491 kW (2,000 hp).
Ki-44-III Ko (Ki-44-IIIa)
Proposed variant with an armament of four 20 mm Ho-5 cannons.
Ki-44-III Otsu (Ki-44-IIIb)
Proposed variant with armament of two 20 mm Ho-5 cannons and two 37 mm (1.46 in) Ho-203 cannons.

Total production: 1,227

== Operators ==
Wartime
Manchukuo

- Manchukuo Air Force

Japan

- Imperial Japanese Army Air Service
- No. 9 Hikō Sentai IJAAS
- No. 22 Hikō Sentai IJAAS
- No. 23 Hikō Sentai IJAAS
- No. 29 Hikō Sentai IJAAS
- No. 47 Dokuritsu Hikō Chutai IJAAS/Hikō Sentai IJAAS
- No. 59 Hikō Sentai IJAAS
- No. 64 Hikō Sentai IJAAS
- No. 70 Hikō Sentai IJAAS
- No. 85 Hikō Sentai IJAAS
- No. 87 Hikō Sentai IJAAS
- No. 104 Hikō Sentai IJAAS
- No. 246 Hikō Sentai IJAAS
- Akeno Army Flight Training School
- Hitachi Army Flight Training School

Postwar
China

- Chinese Nationalist Air Force operated some captured aircraft
  - No. 18 Chungtui (中隊 ~ Squadron) CNAF October 1945 – August 1946

== Specifications (Ki-44-II Otsu) ==

Data from Nakajima Ki-44 Shoki, Japanese Aircraft of the Pacific War

General characteristics

- Crew: One
- Length: 8.84 m (29 ft 0 in)
- Wingspan: 9.45 m (31 ft 0 in)
- Height: 3.25 m (10 ft 8 in)
- Wing area: 15 m^{2} (160 sq ft)
- Airfoil: root: NN-2 mod. (14.8%); tip: NN-2 mod. (9%)-->
- Empty weight: 2,106 kg (4,643 lb)
- Gross weight: 2,764 kg (6,094 lb)
- Max takeoff weight: 2,993 kg (6,598 lb)
- Powerplant: 1 × Nakajima Ha-109 (Army Type 2 1,450hp Air Cooled Radial / unified - Nakajima Ha-34) 14-cylinder air-cooled radial piston engine, 1,133 kW (1,519 hp) for take-off

1,070 kW (1,440 hp) at 2,150 m (7,050 ft)
980 kW (1,320 hp) at 5,250 m (17,220 ft)

- Propellers: 3-bladed constant-speed metal propeller

Performance

- Maximum speed: 605 km/h (376 mph, 327 kn) at 5,200 m (17,100 ft)
- Cruise speed: 400 km/h (250 mph, 220 kn) at 4,000 m (13,000 ft)
- Stall speed: 150 km/h (93 mph, 81 kn)
- Range: 1,200 km (750 mi, 650 nmi)
- Ferry range: 1,600 km (990 mi, 860 nmi)
- Service ceiling: 11,200 m (36,700 ft)
- Time to altitude: 5,000 m (16,000 ft) in four minutes and 17 seconds
- Wing loading: 184 kg/m^{2} (38 lb/sq ft)
- Power/mass: 0.38 kW/kg (0.23 hp/lb)

Armament

- Guns: 2 × fixed, forward-firing, synchronised 12.7 mm (0.500 in) Ho-103 machine guns + 2 × wing mounted 12.7 mm (0.500 in) Ho-103 machine guns

Optional provision for two 40 mm (1.575 in) Ho-301 cannon in the wings, firing caseless ammunition.

- Hardpoints: 2 with a capacity of 2 × 130 L (34 US gal; 29 imp gal) drop tanks

== See also ==
Related development

- Nakajima Ki-84

Aircraft of comparable role, configuration, and era

- Focke-Wulf Fw 190
- Lavochkin La-5
- Mitsubishi J2M Raiden
- Republic P-43 Lancer

Related lists

- List of fighter aircraft
- List of aircraft of World War II
- List of aircraft of Japan, World War II
