= Rikugun Ki-93 =

Japanese WWII fighter prototype

- The prototype before flying

General information
- Type: Heavy fighter
- National origin: Japan
- Manufacturer: Army Aerotechnical Research Institute
- Status: Cancelled
- Primary user: Imperial Japanese Army Air Service (intended)
- Number built: 1

History
- First flight: 8 April 1945

The Rikugun Ki-93 was a prototype, Japanese, twin-engined fighter aircraft of the Second World War. Designed by the Army Aerotechnical Research Institute to be a heavy fighter armed with large calibre cannon to serve in the anti-shipping or bomber destroyer roles, only one example of the Ki-93 was completed; this was damaged on its maiden flight and destroyed by American bombing before it could be flown again.

== Development and design ==
In mid 1941, a team was set up at the Japanese Army Aerotechnical Research Institute (or Rikugun Kokugijutsu Kenkyujo, known by the abbreviation Giken) to study advanced military aircraft. The team drew up preliminary designs for a twin-engined, heavy fighter for the Imperial Japanese Army Air Service to be powered by two Mitsubishi Ha-211 radial engines and estimated to reach a speed of 680 km/h (422 mph). In July 1942, the design, along with some of the team from Giken, was passed to the First Army Air Arsenal (Dai-Ichi Rikugun Kokusho or Kosho) at Tachikawa for further development. Here, the design was refined, with more powerful Mitsubishi Ha-214 radials substituted and a heavy cannon armament added.

Approval to build prototypes of the new fighter, designated Ki-93, was given on 22 February 1943. The Ki-93 was a low-winged monoplane of all metal construction, with the crew of two sitting in tandem under a canopy at the front of the fuselage and a ventral gondola slung under the fuselage to accommodate large cannons. The wing was of laminar flow section. Two variants were planned, the Ki-93-Ia bomber destroyer, armed with a 57 mm and two 20 mm cannon, and the Ki-93-Ib anti-shipping aircraft, which would have a 75 mm gun in the gondola and would also carry two 250 kg (550 lb) bombs.

For long after the war it was accepted that the Ki-93 prototype was equipped with the 57mm Ho-401 automatic cannon used by the Kawasaki Ki-102. However, further research has since shown that the 57mm that equipped the Ki-93 prototype was in fact the Ho-402, an experimental version of the Ho-401 that had been elongated by half a metre in length to achieve higher muzzle velocities. Designed specifically for the prototype, two examples of the weapon were produced; it was intended to have a rate of fire of 80 rpm (equal to the Ho-401) but failed to achieve adequate performance in testing. It is possible that the Ho-402 autocannon was designed and incorporated into the Ki-93 project as a direct reaction to the relative high speed and advanced fire control systems of the B-29 Superfortress; by using a weapon with increased muzzle velocity, a bomber could in theory be engaged at longer ranges, thus reducing the possible risk to the interceptor aircraft as well as extending the time of an engagement in a single pass.

The first prototype proved to be overweight, while the new engines gave much less power than expected, delivering only 1,970 hp compared with the expected 2,400 hp. The Ki-93 made its first flight on 8 April 1945 from Tachikawa airfield; a successful 20 minute test of its low-speed handling characteristics, piloted by Lt. Moriya of the Koku Shinsa-bu (Air Examination Department) with 2nd Lt. Ikebayashi in the second seat. Upon landing, the pilot undershot the runway and touched down in soft soil, ground-looping the aircraft and tearing off the port undercarriage leg and engine mount, also bending the six-blade propeller. Repairs were completed in four weeks but, the night before the scheduled second test flight, a B-29 bombing raid on Tachikawa destroyed the hangar housing the aircraft.

== Specifications (performance estimated, Ki-93-Ia armament) ==
Data from Japanese Aircraft of the Pacific War.

General characteristics

- Crew: 2
- Length: 14.215 m (46 ft 8 in)
- Wingspan: 19.00 m (62 ft 4 in)
- Height: 4.85 m (15 ft 11 in)
- Wing area: 54.75 m^{2} (589.3 sq ft)
- Empty weight: 7,686 kg (16,945 lb)
- Gross weight: 11,440 kg (25,221 lb)
- Powerplant: 2 × Mitsubishi Ha-214 18-cylinder air-cooled radial engine, 1,470 kW (1,970 hp) each (take-off power)
- Propellers: 6-bladed VDM, 3.80 m (12 ft 6 in) diameter

Performance

- Maximum speed: 624 km/h (388 mph, 337 kn) at 8,300 m (27,200 ft)
- Cruise speed: 350 km/h (220 mph, 190 kn) at sea level
- Range: 3,000 km (1,900 mi, 1,600 nmi)
- Service ceiling: 12,050 m (39,530 ft)
- Time to altitude: 9 min 3 sec to 6,000 m (19,700 ft)

Armament

- Guns:
  - 1× 57 mm Ho-402 cannon in ventral gondola
  - 2× 20 mm Ho-5 cannon in wing roots
  - 1× 12.7 mm Ho-103 machine gun on flexible mounting in rear cockpit

== See also ==
Aircraft of comparable role, configuration, and era

- Bristol Brigand
- de Havilland Mosquito FB Mk XVIII
- Henschel Hs 129B-3
- Kawasaki Ki-102
- Junkers Ju 88P
- Mansyū Ki-98
- North American B-25G/H
