= Mark 10 nuclear bomb =

The Mark 10 nuclear bomb was a proposed American nuclear bomb based on the earlier Mark 8 nuclear bomb design. The Mark 10, like the Mark 8, is a gun-type nuclear weapon, which rapidly assembles several critical masses of fissile nuclear material by firing a fissile projectile or "bullet" over a fissile "target", using a system which closely resembles a medium-sized cannon barrel and propellant.

The Mark 10 was intended to be a general purpose airburst nuclear weapon, unlike the Mark 8 which was intended to penetrate into the ground as a Nuclear bunker buster. The removal of the requirement for ground penetration allowed the bomb to be much lighter. It was nicknamed the "Airburst Elsie"; the Mark 8 had been nicknamed the LC or Light Casing bomb, which was then expanded to "Elsie." The bomb was 12 inches (30 cm) in diameter and weighed 1,500 or 1,750 pounds (680 or 790 kg). It had a design yield of 12 to 15 kilotons.

The deign process for the mark 10 began in January 1949 with a study of an improved air burst gun type weapon based upon the Mark 8 as a possible replacement for the then still stockpiled Little Boy bomb.The Mark 10 design was cancelled in may 1952, replaced by the implosion-type Mark 12 which was lighter and used considerably less fissile material.

This is a photo of the exterior of the TX-10 nuclear bomb

== See also ==
- List of nuclear weapons
- Mark 1 Little Boy nuclear bomb
- Mark 8 nuclear bomb

== Bibliography ==
- Coster-Mullen, John (2012). Atom Bombs: The Top Secret Inside Story of Little Boy and Fat Man. Waukesha, Wisconsin: J. Coster-Mullen. OCLC 298514167.
- Complete list of all US nuclear weapons
