= Kawasaki Ki-102 =

Heavy fighter aircraft in Japan

Ki-102
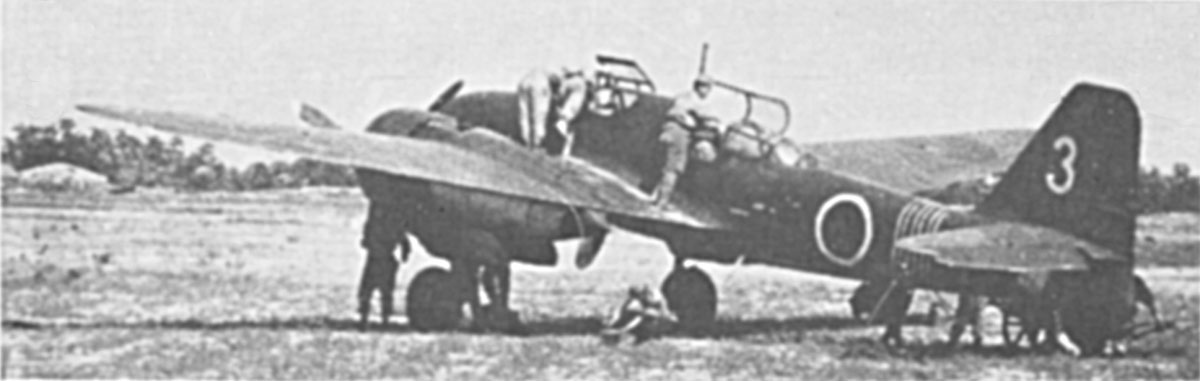
- Kawasaki Ki-102 B attack plane

General information
- Type: Attacker, fighter, night fighter
- National origin: Japan
- Manufacturer: Kawasaki Kōkūki Kōgyō K.K.
- Status: Retired
- Primary user: Imperial Japanese Army Air Force
- Number built: 238

History
- Introduction date: 1944
- First flight: 1944
- Retired: 1945
- Developed from: Kawasaki Ki-96

The Kawasaki Ki-102 or Type 4 Attack Plane (四式襲撃機, Yonshiki shūgeki-ki) was a twin-engine, two-seat, long-range heavy fighter developed to replace the Ki-45 Toryū. Three versions were planned: the Ki-102 Kō day fighter, Ki-102 B ground-attack, and Ki-102 C night fighter. This aircraft's Allied reporting name was "Randy".

== Design and history ==
The Ki-102 entered service in 1944 but saw limited action. The main type (Ki-102 B) was kept in reserve to protect Japan, although it did see some limited duty in the Okinawa campaign. It was kept out of front line service because it was hoped that it would be the carrier of the Ki-148 air-to-surface guided missile when the Allied invasion of Japan occurred.

== Variants ==
Ki-102
prototypes, three built
Ki-102 A (kō/甲)
Externally similar to the Ki-102 B, but with turbosuperchargers that enabled the engines to maintain their rating at higher altitudes. The 57 mm (2.24 in) cannon was swapped in favor of a 37 mm (1.46 in) cannon, and the 12.7 mm (.50 in) rear gun was deleted, 26 built.
Ki-102 B (otsu/乙)
Ground-attack variant similar to prototypes, except with revised tail wheel, 207 built
Ki-102 C (hei/丙)
Night fighter version with lengthened fuselage and span. Radar under a Plexiglas dome, oblique-firing 20 mm cannons, and the 20 mm cannons in the belly replaced with 30 mm (1.18 in) cannons in Schräge Musik behind the cockpit, two built.
Ki-108
High-altitude fighter prototype with pressurised cabin, two conversions from Ki-102 B aircraft using the structural improvements used on the Ki-102 C.
Ki-108 Kai
Improved version of the Ki-108 with longer fuselage and enlarged wings. Two built.

== Specifications (Ki-102 B) ==
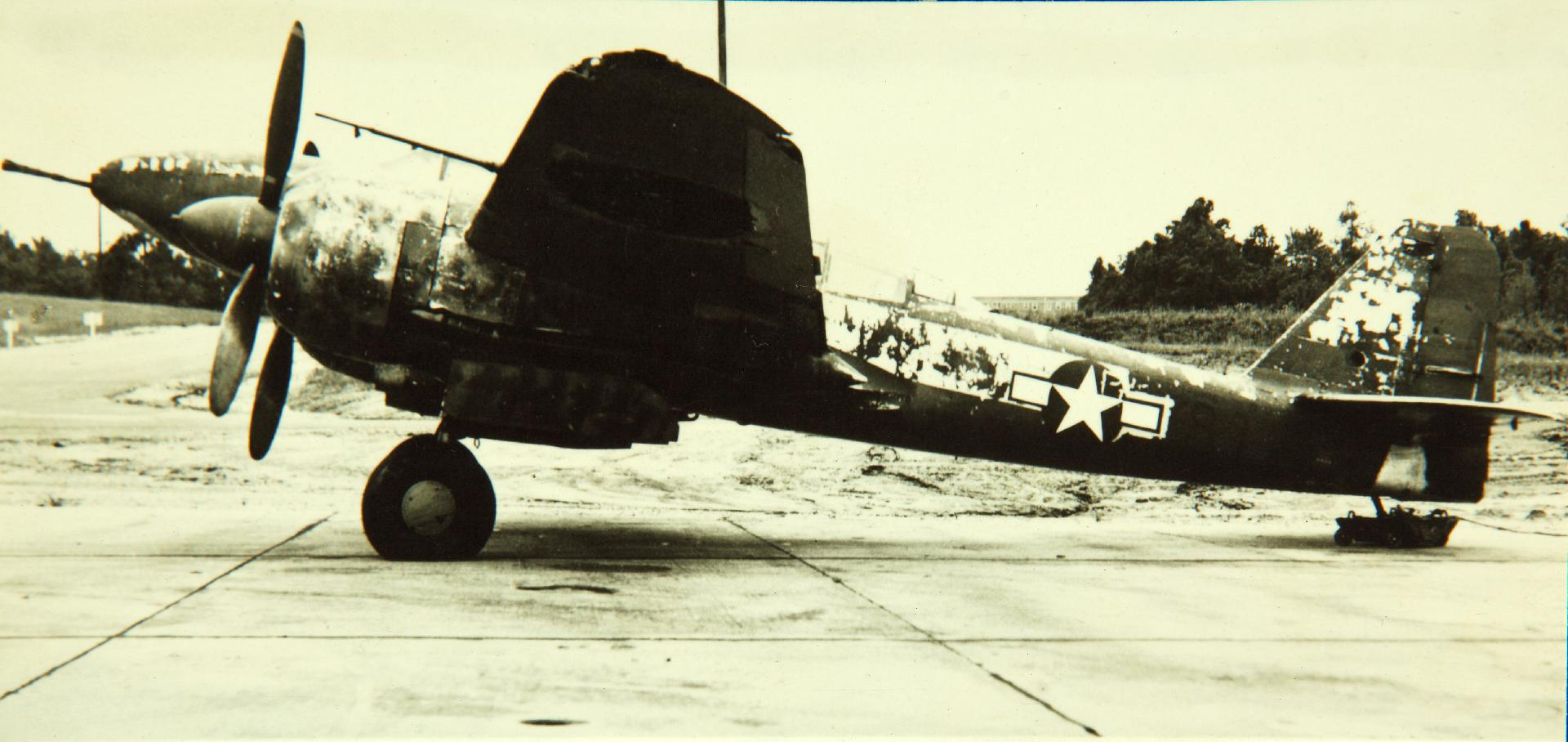
Ki-102 Kō in USAAF markings after the war

Data from Japanese Aircraft of the Pacific War

General characteristics

- Crew: 2
- Length: 11.45 m (37 ft 7 in)
- Wingspan: 15.57 m (51 ft 1 in)
- Height: 3.7 m (12 ft 2 in)
- Wing area: 34 m^{2} (370 sq ft)
- Airfoil: root: NACA 24015; tip: NACA 23010
- Empty weight: 4,950 kg (10,913 lb)
- Gross weight: 7,300 kg (16,094 lb)
- Powerplant: 2 × Mitsubishi Ha112-II Ru 14-cylinder air-cooled radial engine, 1,120 kW (1,500 hp) each
- Propellers: 3-bladed constant-speed propellers

Performance

- Maximum speed: 580 km/h (360 mph, 310 kn)
- Range: 2,000 km (1,200 mi, 1,100 nmi)
- Service ceiling: 10,000 m (33,000 ft)
- Rate of climb: 11.9 m/s (2,340 ft/min)
- Power/mass: 0.417 kW/kg (0.254 hp/lb)

Armament

- Guns:
  - 1 × 57 mm (2.24 in) Ho-401 cannon—replaced in the 102a with a 37 mm (1.46 in) Ho-204 cannon, deleted in the 102 C
  - 2 × 20 mm Ho-5 cannon in the belly—replaced in the 102 C with 30 mm (1.18 in) cannon in the package, plus oblique-firing 2 × 20 mm cannon
  - 1 × 12.7 mm (0.50 in) Ho-103 machine gun (deleted in the Ki-102a and Ki-102)
- Bombs:
  - 2 × 200 L (53 US gal) drop tanks; or
  - 2 × 250 kg (551 lb) bombs or
  - 1 × Kawasaki Igo-1b guided missile

== See also ==
Related development

- Kawasaki Ki-96

Aircraft of comparable role, configuration, and era

- Bristol Beaufighter
- de Havilland Mosquito
- Douglas A-26 Invader
- Grumman F7F Tigercat
- Henschel Hs 129
- Messerschmitt Me 410
- Mitsubishi Ki-83
- Nakajima J1N
- Rikugun Ki-93

Related lists

- List of aircraft of Japan during World War II
- List of aircraft of World War II
