= Type 97 automatic cannon =

Japanese anti-tank rifle

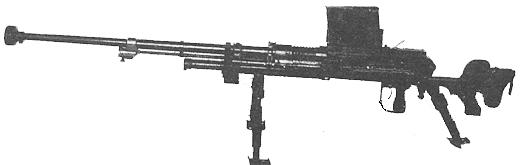
- Type: Anti-tank rifle
- Place of origin: Empire of Japan

Service history
- Used by: Imperial Japanese Army
- Wars: Second Sino-Japanese War; Soviet–Japanese border conflicts World War II

Production history
- Designed: 1935–1938
- Manufacturer: Kokura Arsenal
- Unit cost: ¥6,400
- Produced: 1939–1943
- No. built: 1108

Specifications
- Mass: 52 kg (115 lb)
- Length: 2.09 m (6 ft 10 in)
- Barrel length: 1.065 m (3 ft 5.9 in)
- Cartridge: 20×124mm
- Cartridge weight: about 320 g (11 oz) (AP-T)
- Action: Gas-operated, open bolt, semi-automatic
- Rate of fire: 12 rounds/min
- Muzzle velocity: 792 m/s (2,600 ft/s) (AP-T)
- Maximum firing range: 2,000 m (2,200 yd)
- Feed system: 7-round box magazine

The Type 97 automatic cannon (九七式自動砲, Kyū-nana-shiki-jidōhō) is a 20-millimeter (0.8 in) Japanese anti-tank rifle that began development in the 1930s. It was used by the Imperial Japanese Army (IJA) during the Second Sino-Japanese War, the Soviet–Japanese border conflicts and the Pacific War. Improvements in armour thicknesses on tanks rendered the Type 97 obsolete by about 1942. This weapon was not related to the Type 97 heavy tank machine gun used in armored vehicles or the Type 97 aircraft machine gun used in Japanese Navy aircraft.

== Development and description ==
Concerned by reports of Chinese purchases of Vickers six-ton tanks and rising tensions with the Soviet Red Army along the Manchurian border, the IJA issued a requirement for an anti-tank rifle in 1935. The Nagoya Arsenal submitted a weapon derived from their copy of the 13.2-millimetre (0.52 in) Hotchkiss M1929 machine gun while the Kokura Arsenal submitted a new design using a 20×124 mm cartridge. The first round of testing in March 1936 was not satisfactory and both guns were returned to their designers to rectify problems encountered during the trials. The Kokura Arsenal built eight prototypes for the second round of trials held at the Army Infantry School in 1937, after which the IJA rejected the Nagoya weapon. It identified several problems that required fixing, and a batch of fifty guns was built for operational trials in 1938. After another round of trials in December at the infantry and cavalry schools, the weapon was accepted as the Type 97 Automatic Cannon.

The gun has a gas-operated delayed-blowback mechanism in which the barrel and receiver also recoiled to help steady the weapon. Despite reports that it can fire in full-automatic mode, the weapon is semi-automatic only as it lacks a selector to disable the semi-auto disconnector. The Type 97 was the heaviest anti-tank rifle of World War II and weighs 52 kilograms (115 lb) ready to fire, minus the gun shield, and 68 kilograms (150 lb) including the shield and four carrying handles, exceeding its design weight of 40 kilograms (88 lb). It uses a seven-round removable box magazine mounted above the receiver. The gun can fire a dozen rounds per minute. It has an overall length of 2.09 metres (6 ft 10 in) and the removable barrel, including the muzzle brake, was 1.065 metres (3 ft 5.9 in) (53-calibers) long.

The Type 97 fired solid-steel armour-piercing-tracer (AP-T), high-explosive-tracer and high-explosive incendiary-tracer shells, weighing about 132 grams (4.7 oz). The initial AP-T round was the Type 97 and it had a softer grade of steel than the later Type 100. The 162-gram (5.7 oz) AP-T projectiles had a muzzle velocity of 792 m/s (2,600 ft/s). Based on a captured Japanese ammunition table, the Type 97 round was credited with the ability to penetrate 30 mm (1.2 in) of armour at 90° at a range of 250 metres (270 yd). The same table credited it with the ability to penetrate 9 mm (0.35 in) of armour at 2,000 metres (2,200 yd).

== Production and service ==
Production of the Type 97 began in 1939 at the Kokura Arsenal with the first of 950 that were made through 1941. Production ceased that year, although a further 100 rifles were built by the Nihon Seikosho Company in the first half of 1943. Including prototypes, a total of 1,108 rifles were manufactured. The anti-tank rifle cost ¥6,400 at a time when a normal rifle cost ¥77. Beginning in 1940, the barrels were chrome-plated to extend their service lives.

The Type 97 was assigned to IJA infantry battalions, normally on the basis of a single anti-tank platoon allocated to each infantry company. Each platoon had two 11-man sections each with a single Type 97. In addition to the section leader, there were four men assigned to carry the gun, four ammunition bearers and two horse-holders for the nine horses nominally assigned to the section. Over long distances, the Type 97 was broken down into three parts to be carried by the horses.

The weapon first saw combat during the Battles of Khalkhin Gol in 1939, where it reportedly disabled a number of the lightly armoured vehicles used by the Soviets at that time. The Type 97 was not extensively deployed in China until the following year, by which time they were mostly used as infantry support weapons. Reflecting this change, most of the ammunition produced in 1941–1942 was high-explosive, not armour-piercing. (Note: This is not confirmed by the figures in Ness.) The rifle was not widely deployed in the Southwest Pacific during World War II, although it was used by the Teishin Shudan paratroopers of the Imperial Japanese Army Air Force. The Type 97's 20 mm round was no longer effective against modern tanks after 1942. The Ho-1 and Ho-3 autocannon were developed from the Type 97 for use on aircraft.

== See also ==
- Lahti L-39
- Mauser 1918 T-Gewehr
- Panzerbüchse 39
- PTRD-41
- PTRS-41
- Solothurn S-18/100
- Wz. 35 anti-tank rifle
- MG 18 TuF
