= Mark 8 nuclear bomb =

American nuclear bomb

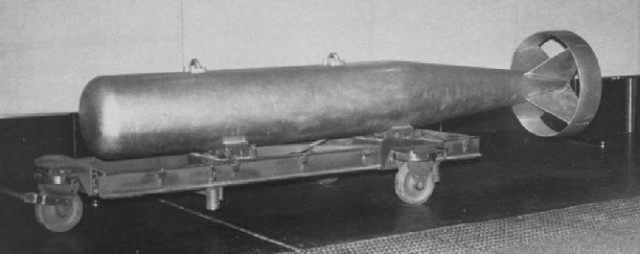
- A Mark 8 nuclear bomb
- Type: Nuclear weapon
- Place of origin: United States

Production history
- Designer: Los Alamos Scientific Laboratory
- Produced: 1951–1953
- No. built: 40

Specifications
- Mass: 3,230–3,280 pounds (1,470–1,490 kg)
- Length: 116 to 132 inches (290 to 340 cm)
- Diameter: 14.5 inches (37 cm)
- Filling: Highly enriched uranium
- Blast yield: 25–30 kilotons of TNT (100–130 TJ)

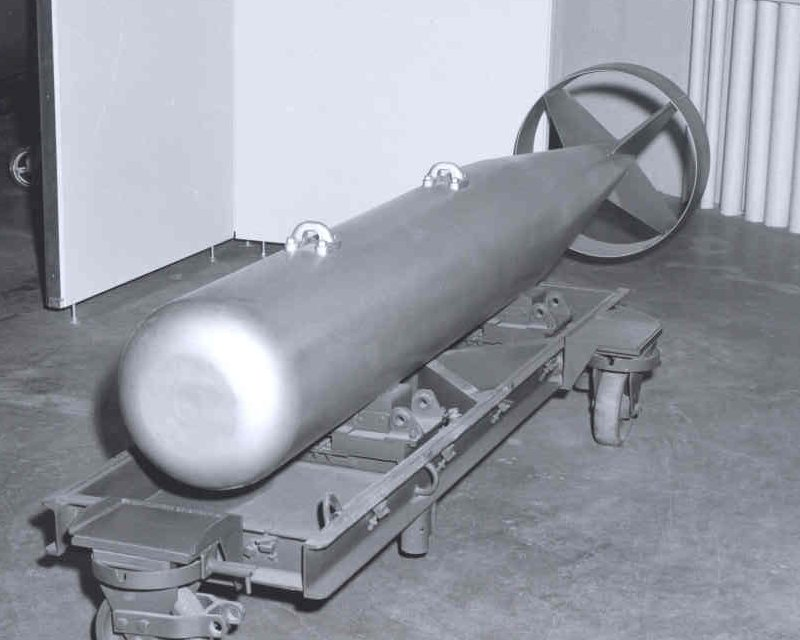
Closeup of the nose of a Mark 8

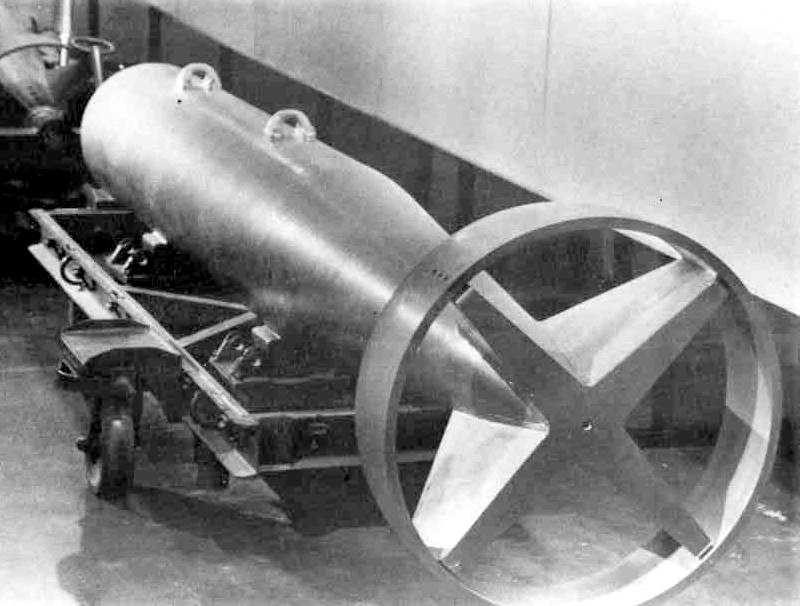
Closeup of the tail of a Mark 8

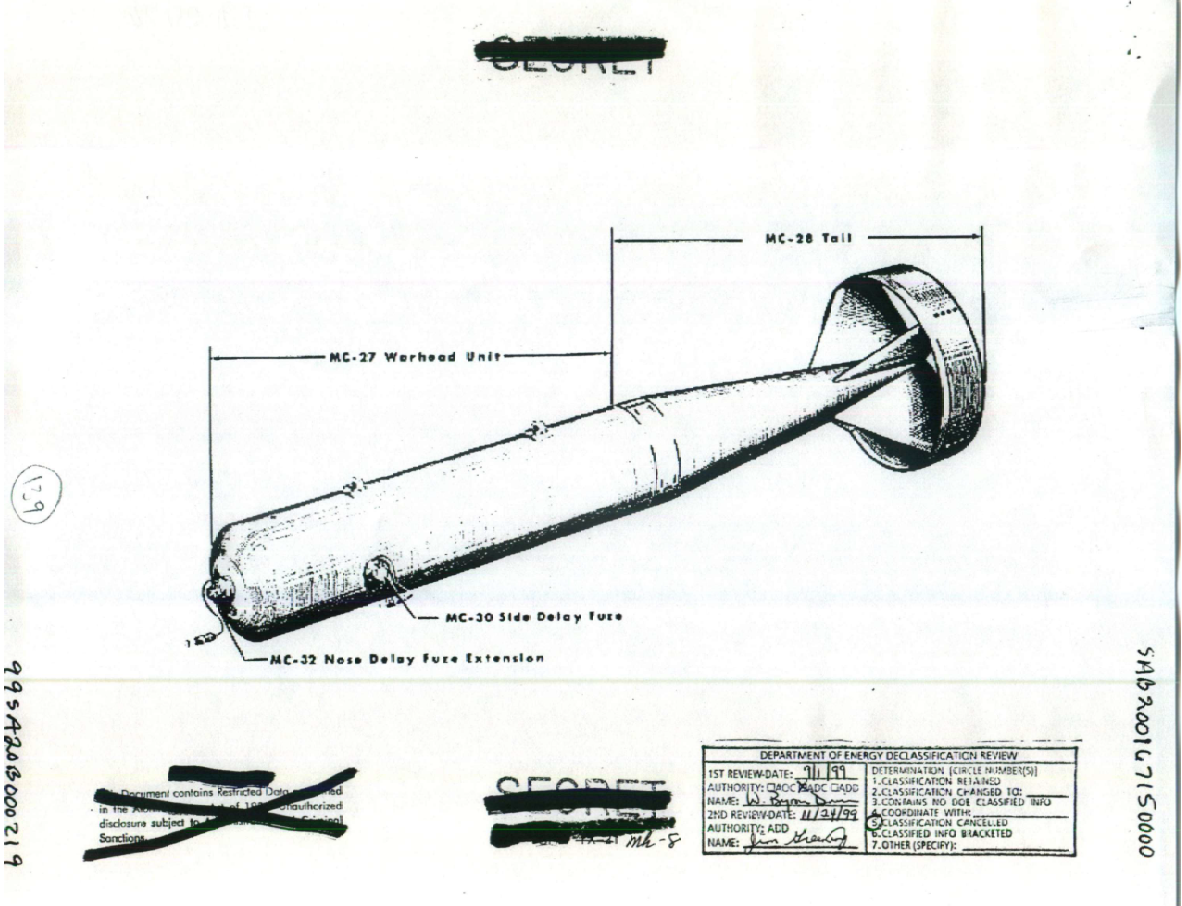
Diagram of the Mk8

The Mark 8 nuclear bomb was an American nuclear bomb, designed in the late 1940s and early 1950s, which was in service from 1952 to 1957.

== Description ==
The Mark 8 was a gun-type nuclear bomb, which rapidly assembles several critical masses of fissile nuclear material by firing a fissile projectile or "bullet" over and around a fissile "target", using a system which closely resembles a medium-sized cannon barrel and propellant.

The Mark 8 was an early earth-penetrating bomb (see nuclear bunker buster), intended to dig into the earth some distance prior to detonating. According to one government source, the Mark 8 could penetrate 22 feet (6.7 m) of reinforced concrete, 90 feet (27 m) of hard sand, 120 feet (37 m) of clay, or 5 inches (13 cm) of hardened armor-plate steel.

The Mark 8 was 14.5 inches (37 cm) in diameter across its body and 116 to 132 inches (290 to 340 cm) long depending on submodel. It weighed 3,230 to 3,280 pounds (1,470 to 1,490 kg), and had a yield of 25-30 kilotons.

A total of 40 Mark 8 bombs were produced, with 2 variants: an internally carried Mod 0 which had a blunt nose and an externally carried Mod 1 version which had an extension with a more aerodynamic nose.

The Mark 8 was succeeded by an improved variant, the Mark 11 nuclear bomb. Both the Mark 8 and the Mark 11 could use the same fissile material "gun cores."

== Variants ==
The Mark 8 was considered a cratering warhead for the SSM-N-8 Regulus cruise missile. This W8 variant was cancelled in 1955.

A lighter Mark 8 variant, the Mark 10 nuclear bomb, was developed as a lightweight airburst (surface target) bomb. The Mark 10 project was cancelled prior to introduction into service, replaced by the much more fissile-material-efficient Mark 12 nuclear bomb implosion design.

== On display ==
A Mark 8 casing is on display at the National Museum of Nuclear Science & History

== See also ==
- List of nuclear weapons
- Mark 1 Little Boy nuclear bomb
