= GAU-7 cannon =

Ford-Philco GAU-7 cannon
- Type: Gatling-type machine gun
- Place of origin: United States

Production history
- Designer: Ford-Philco

Specifications
- Cartridge: 25mm caseless
- Caliber: 25mm

The Ford-Philco GAU-7/A was an abortive program initiated by United States Air Force in the late 1960s to develop a new cannon for the proposed F-14 ADC interceptor and replace the M61 Vulcan on the then-upcoming F-15 Eagle. The GAU-7/A was a 25 mm Gatling gun using telescoped ammunition with a combustible case developed by the Brunswick Corporation. It was intended to have greater range and hitting power than the 20 mm Vulcan, while the caseless ammunition would have alleviated the problems of either storing or ejecting spent cartridges, both of which present considerable problems for jet aircraft.

Despite great expenditure, the project and its ammunition proved to be a failure, and it was canceled in 1974. The F-15 therefore retained the M61A1 cannon, as have most U.S. fighter aircraft since 1956.

== See also ==
- GAU-12 Equalizer
