= Ho-204 cannon =

- Type: Aircraft cannon
- Place of origin: Imperial Japanese army

Service history
- Wars: World War II

Specifications
- Mass: 130 kg (290 lb)
- Length: 2,390 mm (94 in)
- Barrel length: 1,260 mm (50 in)
- Cartridge: 37 x 144mm
- Calibre: 37 mm (1.5 in) (475 g)
- Action: Short recoil-operated
- Rate of fire: 400 rounds/min
- Muzzle velocity: 710 m/s (2,300 ft/s)

Ho-204 was a Japanese aircraft autocannon that saw limited use during World War II. It was the largest gun to see active service derived from the Model 1921 Aircraft Browning. It was used as upward-oblique armament in the Ki-46-III.

== Specifications ==
- Caliber: 37 mm (1.45 in)
- Overall length: 2,390 mm (94 in)
- Barrel length: 1,260 mm (49.6 in)
- Ammunition: 37 x 144 (475 g)
- Weight: 130 kg (285 lb)
- Rate of fire: 400 rounds/min
- Muzzle velocity: 710 m/s (2,330 ft/s)

== See also ==
- Ho-5 cannon
- MK 108 cannon
- Ho-155 cannon
- Ho-203 cannon
- Ho-301 cannon
- Ho-401 cannon

== Bibliography ==
- Gustin, Emmanuel; Williams, Anthony G. (2003). Flying Guns: The Development of Aircraft Guns, Ammunition and Installations 1933–1945. Marlborough, UK: Airlife. ISBN 978-1-84037-227-4.
