= Kawasaki Ki-45 =

Japanese WW2 heavy fighter

Ki-45
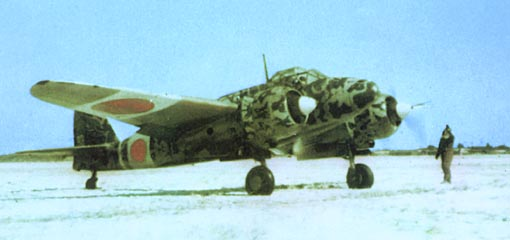
- Kawasaki Ki-45 Toryū

General information
- Type: Heavy fighter; Interceptor; Night fighter; Escort fighter; Fighter-bomber/Strike fighter
- Manufacturer: Kawasaki Kōkūki Kōgyō K.K.
- Designer: Takeo Doi
- Primary users: Imperial Japanese Army Air Service People's Liberation Army Air Force
- Number built: 1,701

History
- Introduction date: October 1941
- First flight: January 1939
- Retired: 1945
- Developed into: Kawasaki Ki-96

The Kawasaki Ki-45 Toryū (屠龍, Dragonslayer) is a two-seat, twin-engined, heavy fighter used by the Imperial Japanese Army in World War II. The army gave it the designation "Type 2 Two-Seat Fighter" (二式複座戦闘機, Ni-shiki fukuza sentōki); the Allied reporting name was "Nick". Originally serving as a long-range escort-fighter, the design — as with most heavy fighters of the period — fell prey to smaller, lighter, more agile, single-engined fighters. As such, the Ki-45 instead served as a day and night interceptor and strike fighter.

== Design and development ==
In response to the rapid emergence in Europe of twin-engined heavy fighters such as the Messerschmitt Bf 110, the army ordered development of a twin-engined, two-seat fighter in 1937, and assigned the proposal by Kawasaki Shipbuilding the designation of Ki-38. This only went as far as a mock up, but by December of that year, the army ordered a working prototype as the Ki-45, which first flew in January 1939. Results from the test flights, however, did not meet the army's expectations. The Ha-20 Otsu engine was underpowered and failure-prone, while the airframe suffered from nacelle stall.

The Ki-45 did not enter service, but the army, insistent on having a working twin-engined fighter, ordered Kawasaki to continue development. Kawasaki responded by replacing the engines with the proven Nakajima Ha-25. Flight tests were promising.

In October 1940, the army ordered continued improvements such as switching to 805 kW (1,080 hp) Mitsubishi Ha-102 engines. This craft, designated Ki-45 Kai, was completed in September 1941 and was officially adopted for use by the army in February 1942 as the "Type 2 two-seat fighter".

The prototype of a single-seat fighter variant, the Ki-45 II, was also built; development continued under the designation Ki-96.

== Operational history ==
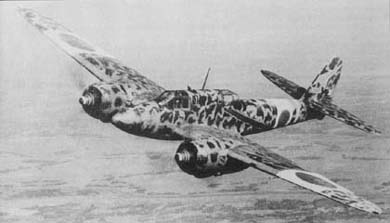
Kawasaki Ki-45 Kai C; Army Type 2 two-seat fighter Model C of the 53rd Hiko Sentai

The Ki-45 was initially used as a long-range bomber escort. The 84th Independent Flight Wing (Dokuritsu Hikō Chutai) used them in June 1942 in attacks on Guilin, where they encountered, but were no match for, Curtiss P-40s flown by the Flying Tigers. In September of the same year, they met P-40s over Hanoi with similar results. The Ki-45 was soon found that it clearly could not hold its own against single-engined fighters in aerial combat.

It was subsequently deployed in several theaters in the roles of interception, attack (antiground as well as antishipping), and fleet defense. Its greatest strength turned out to be as an antibomber interceptor, as was the case with the Bf 110 in Europe. In New Guinea, the IJAAF used the aircraft in an antiship role, where the Ki-45 was heavily armed with one 37 mm (1.46 in) and two 20 mm (0.79 in) cannons and could carry two 250 kg (550 lb) bombs on hard points under the wings; 1,675 Ki-45s of all versions were produced during the War.

The first production type (Ko) was armed with two 12.7 mm (0.50 in) Ho-103 machine gun in the nose, a single Type 97 20 mm (0.79 in) cannon in the belly offset to the right, and a trainable 7.92 mm (0.312 in) machine gun in the rear cabin; this was followed by the Otsu with the lower 20 mm (0.79 in) cannon replaced by a 37 mm (1.46 in) Type 94 tank gun, to counter B-17 Flying Fortress bombers. While the firepower was devastating, manual reloading meant that typically only two rounds could be fired on each gunnery pass. The next type (Hei) restored the 20 mm (0.79 in) cannon, and this time placed an automatic 37 mm (1.46 in) gun in the nose. A later addition in the Tei type were twin obliquely-firing 20 mm (0.79 in) Ho-5 cannons behind the cockpit and often propulsive exhaust stacks.

Soon after entering service, the Ki-45 was assigned to home defense, and several were dispatched against the Doolittle Raid, though they did not see action. The craft's heavy armament proved to be effective against the B-29 Superfortress raids, which started in June 1944. However, its performance was insufficient to counter B-29s flying at 10,000 m (32,800 ft). Modifications, such as reduction of fuel and ordnance, were attempted to raise performance, to little avail, and in the end, the aircraft were used effectively in aerial ramming attacks.

They were also used in kamikaze attacks, such as the attack on USS Dickerson on 2 April 1945 off Okinawa. The commanding officer and 54 crew were killed when a Toryū clipped the stacks from astern and rammed the bridge. A second Toryū hit the foredeck, opening a 7 m (23 ft) hole in the deck. The ensuing fires demolished the ship, and, after the surviving crew was rescued by fellow fast transports, destroyer escort Bunch and destroyer-transport Herbert, the ship was towed out to sea and scuttled.

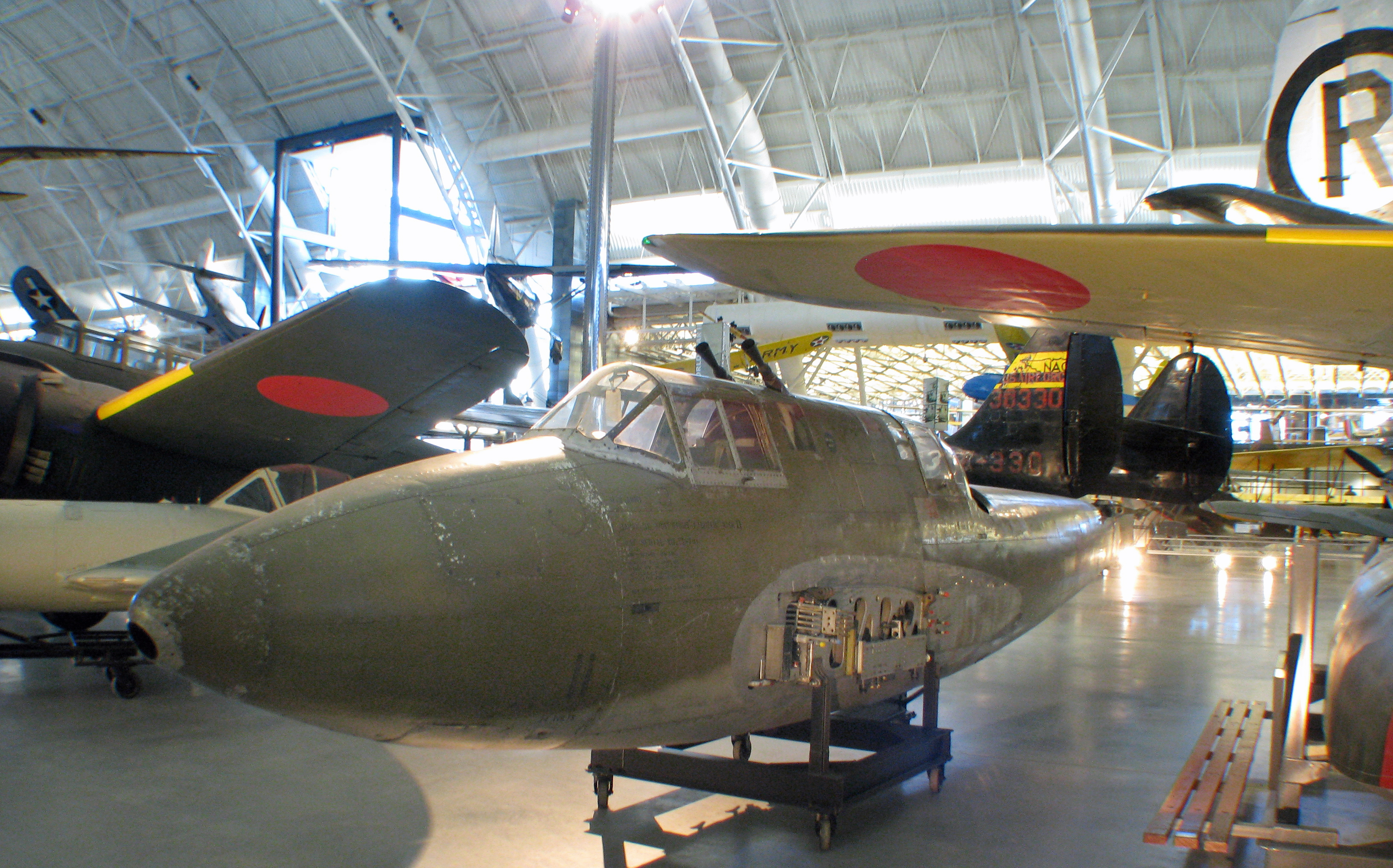
The fuselage of the sole surviving Ki-45 Kai C, on display at the Steven F. Udvar-Hazy Center in Chantilly, Virginia, with a Schräge Musik-type vertical cannon mount behind the cockpit

In 1945, the forward and upward-firing guns showed some results with the commencement of nighttime bombing raids, but the lack of radar was a considerable handicap. By the spring of 1945, the advent of American carrier-based fighters and Iwo Jima-based P-51s and P-47s escorting B-29s over the skies of Japan brought the Ki-45's career to an end.

The next version, the Kawasaki Ki-45 Kai D, was developed specifically as a night fighter, which was supposed to be equipped with centimetric radar in the nose; due to production difficulties, this did not occur. The aircraft took part in night defense of the Home Islands and equipped four sentais from the autumn of 1944 to the war's end. They obtained notable successes, and one Ki-45 sentai claimed 150 victories, including eight USAAF B-29 Superfortresses in their first combat.

The Ki-45 was to be replaced in the ground-attack role by the Ki-102 but was not wholly supplanted by the war's end.

Three Ki-45s fell into communist Chinese hands after World War II. Unlike most captured Japanese aircraft, which were employed in the training role, the three Ki-45s were assigned to the 1st Squadron of the Combat Flying Group in March 1949 and were used in combat missions. These aircraft were retired in the early 1950s.

== Variants ==
There is sometimes a confusion in the different subtypes. The information below is based on Japanese work, not on usual 'western' data. Even the NASM claims that the Ki-45 on display is a hei (c) type whereas Japanese press would read it is a tei (d) type nightfighter version with dorsal armament.

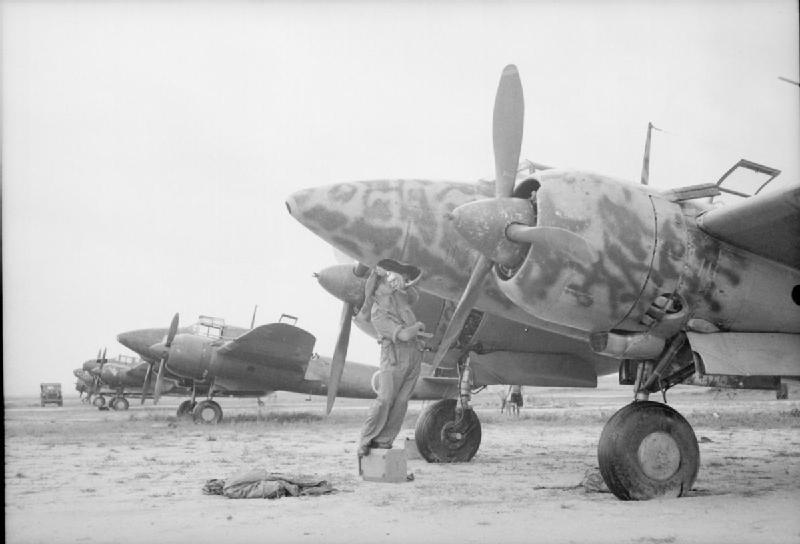
Abandoned Ki-45s of the 71st Dokuritsu Hiko Chutai at Kallang Airfield, Singapore, in September 1945.

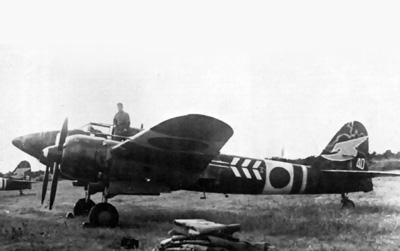
Another Kawasaki Ki-45 of the 53rd Hiko Sentai, active on home defence, as depicted by the wide white band surrounding the Hinomaru

Ki-45
Prototype aircraft
Ki-45 Type 1
Modified operative models
Ki-45 Kai
Prototype aircraft
Ki-45 Kai
Pre-series aircraft
Ki-45 Kai A (kō/甲)
Two-seat fighter Type 2 of the army (modified A) initial model of series, one 20 mm (0.79 in) Ho-3 in ventral position, two Ho-103 12.7 mm (0.50 in) in the nose and a flexible 7.92 mm (0.312 in) in the back position
Ki-45 Kai B (otsu/乙)
Retrofit version based on the Kai A, 20 mm (0.79 in) belly cannon replaced by a 37 mm Type 94 anti-tank gun
Ki-45 Kai C (hei/丙)
Modified C version against naval objectives, one 37 mm (1.46 in) Ho-203 automatic cannon in the nose, one 7.92 mm (0.312 in) machine gun in the back position.
Ki-45 Kai D (tei/丁)
Modified D, a modified Kai B, night fighter version, equipped with one 37 mm (1.46 in) Ho-203 cannon in nose and two fixed 20 mm (0.79 in) Ho-5 cannons in a Schräge Musik-style dorsal frontal position, and one 7.92 mm (0.312 in) Type 98 machine gun in the back position
Ki-45 II
Single-seat fighter prototype; later re-designated Ki-96

Total production: 1,691 or 1,701 units.

== Operators ==
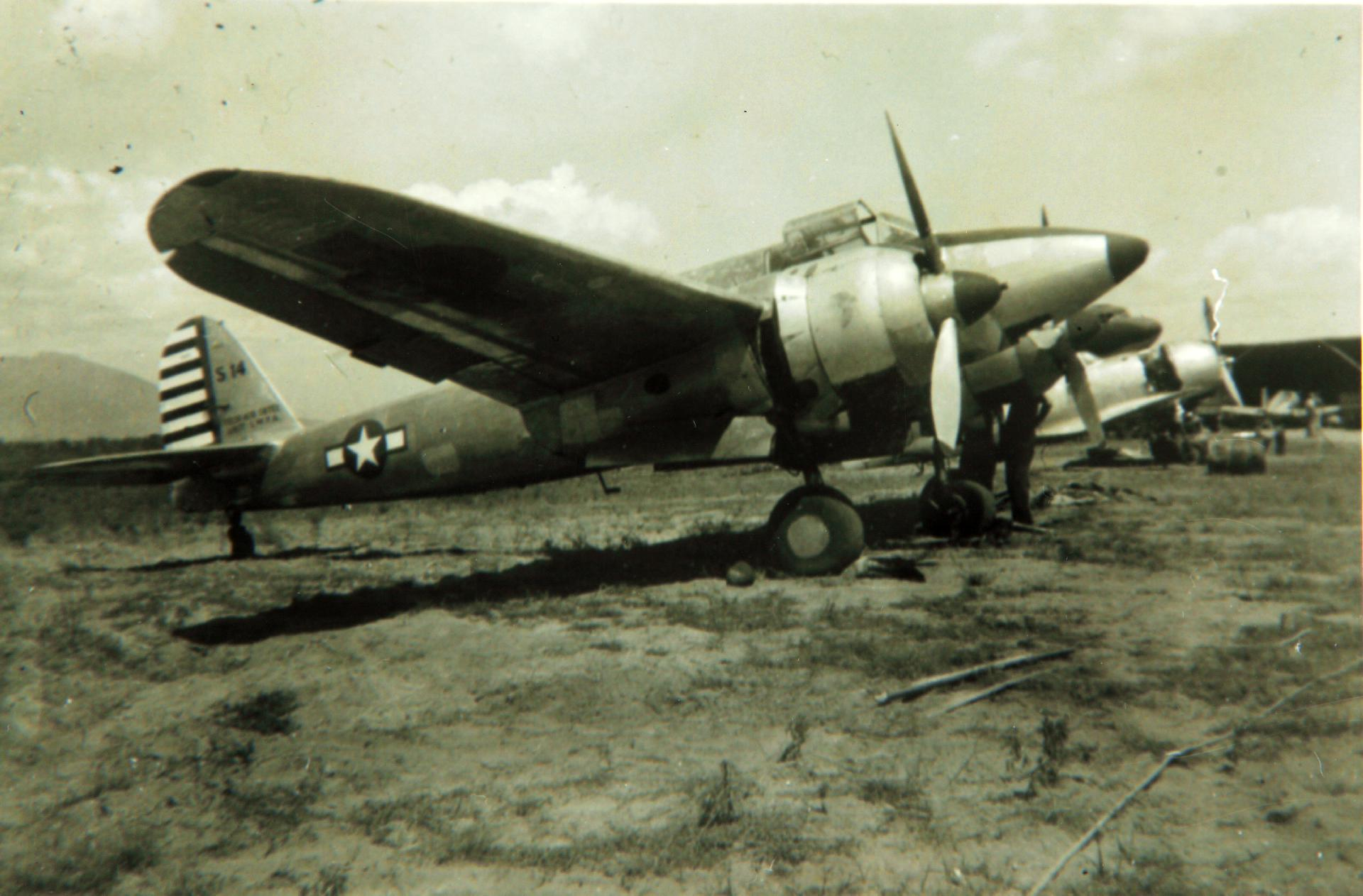
Captured Ki-45 following the end of the war

Japan

- Imperial Japanese Army Air Force
  - No. 25 Dokuritsu Hikō Chutai IJAAF
  - No. 71 Dokuritsu Hikō Chutai IJAAF
  - No. 84 Dokuritsu Hikō Chutai IJAAF
  - No. 4 Hikō Sentai IJAAF
  - No. 5 Hikō Sentai IJAAF
  - No. 13 Hikō Sentai IJAAF
  - No. 16 Hikō Sentai IJAAF
  - No. 21 Hikō Sentai IJAAF
  - No. 27 Hikō Sentai IJAAF
  - No. 45 Hikō Sentai IJAAF
  - No. 53 Hikō Sentai IJAAF
  - No. 65 Hikō Sentai IJAAF
  - No. 70 Hikō Sentai IJAAF
  - Akeno Army Fighter Training School

Manchukuo

- Manchukuo Air Force

China

- People's Liberation Army Air Force

== Surviving aircraft ==
Only one Ki-45 Kai C remains today. It was one of about 145 Japanese aircraft brought to the United States aboard the USS Barnes for evaluation after World War II. It underwent an overhaul at Middletown Air Depot, Pennsylvania, and was test-flown at Wright Field, Ohio, and Naval Air Station Anacostia in Washington, D.C.. The United States Army Air Forces donated the Toryū to the Smithsonian Institution in June 1946. The fuselage of this Ki-45 is currently on display at the Steven F. Udvar-Hazy Center, alongside other Japanese aircraft such as a Nakajima J1N, Kyushu J7W Shinden and Aichi M6A, while the rest of the aircraft is in storage at the Paul E. Garber Preservation, Restoration, and Storage Facility.

== Specifications (Ki-45 Kai C) ==
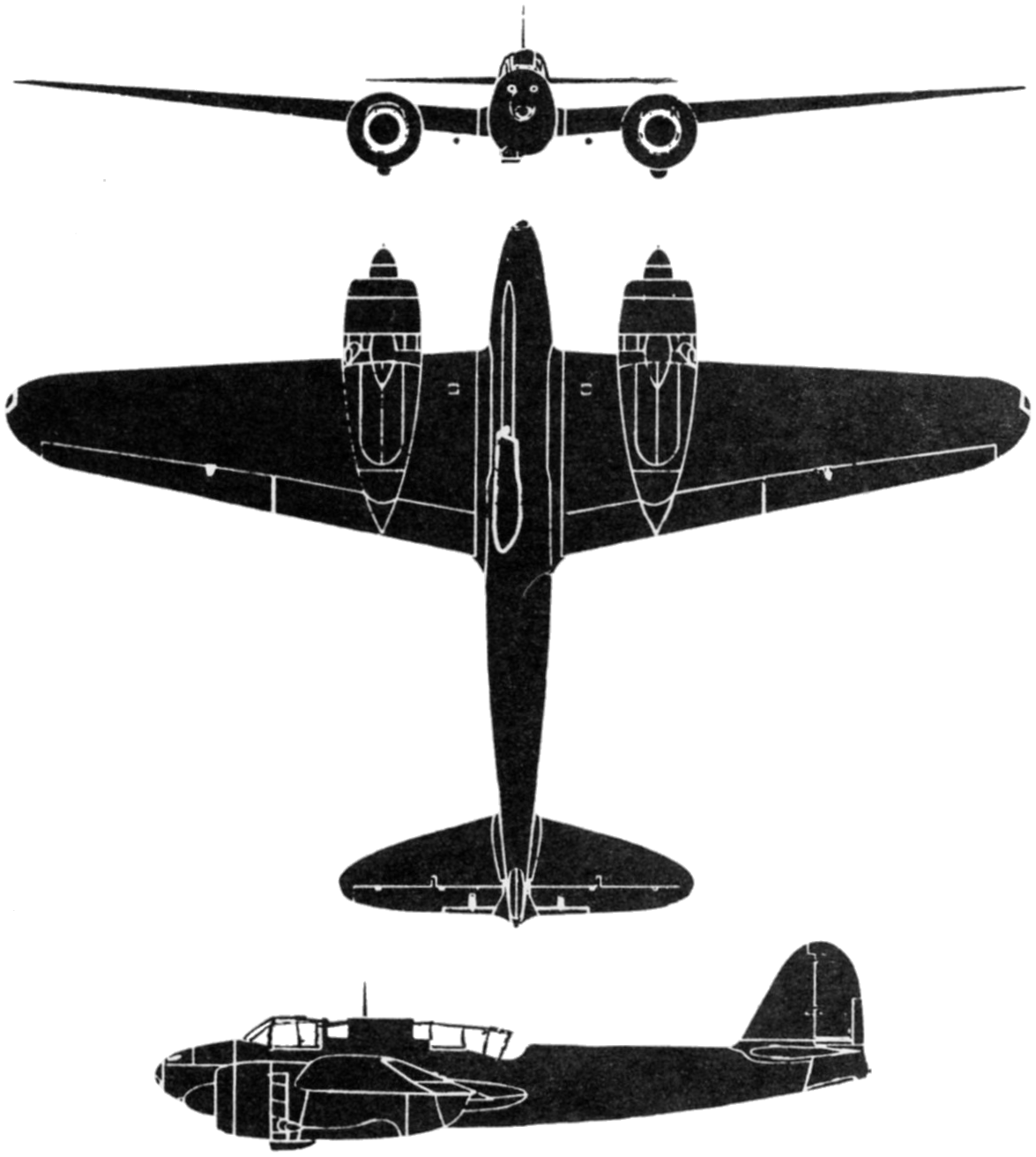
3-view silhouette of the Kawasaki Ki-45

Data from Japanese Aircraft of the Pacific War

General characteristics

- Crew: 2
- Length: 11 m (36 ft 1 in)
- Wingspan: 15.02 m (49 ft 3 in)
- Height: 3.7 m (12 ft 2 in)
- Wing area: 32 m^{2} (340 sq ft)
- Airfoil: root: NACA 24015; tip: NACA 23010
- Empty weight: 4,000 kg (8,818 lb)
- Gross weight: 8,820 kg (19,445 lb)
- Powerplant: 2 × Mitsubishi Ha-102 14-cylinder air-cooled radial piston engines, 783 kW (1,050 hp) each
- Propellers: 3-bladed constant-speed propellers

Performance

- Maximum speed: 540 km/h (340 mph, 290 kn)
- Range: 2,000 km (1,200 mi, 1,100 nmi)
- Service ceiling: 10,000 m (33,000 ft)
- Rate of climb: 11.7 m/s (2,300 ft/min)
- Wing loading: 171.9 kg/m^{2} (35.2 lb/sq ft)
- Power/mass: 0.26 kW/kg (0.16 hp/lb)

Armament

- 1 × 37 mm (1.457 in) Ho-203 cannon, or 1 × 20 mm (0.787 in) Ho-3 cannon
- 1 × 7.92 mm (0.312 in) Type 98 machine gun on a flexible mount in the rear cockpit

== See also ==
Aircraft of comparable role, configuration, and era

- Breda Ba.88
- Breguet 693
- Focke-Wulf Fw 187 Falke
- Fokker G.I
- Messerschmitt Bf 110
- Nakajima J1N
- Potez 630
- PZL.38 Wilk
- Tairov Ta-3
- Westland Whirlwind

Related lists

- List of aircraft of Japan during World War II
- List of aircraft of World War II
