= Mark 11 nuclear bomb =

American nuclear bomb

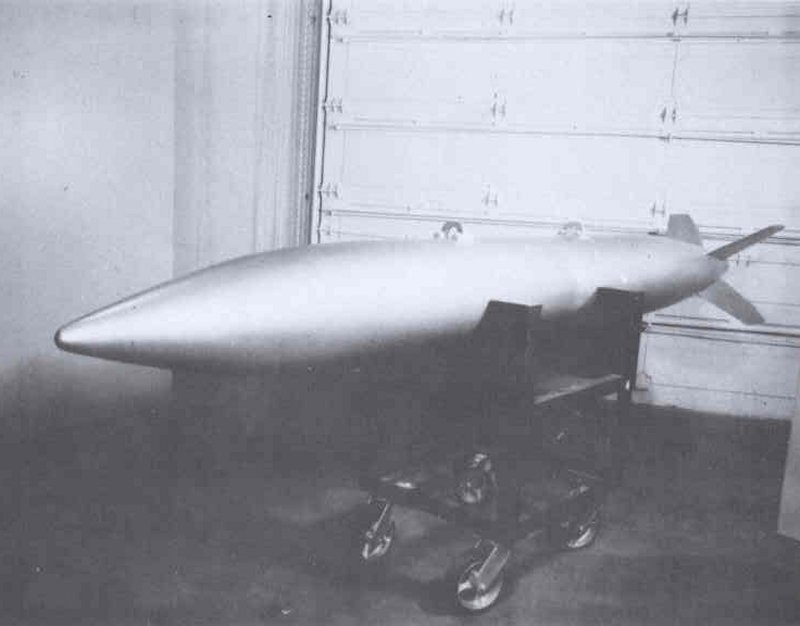
- The Mk-11 nuclear bomb
- Type: Nuclear weapon
- Place of origin: United States

Production history
- Developed from: mark 8 nuclear bomb
- Produced: 1956-1960
- No. built: 40

Specifications
- Mass: 3,210–3,500 pounds (1,460–1,590 kg)
- Length: 147 inches (370 cm)
- Diameter: 14 inches (36 cm)
- Filling: Highly enriched uranium
- Blast yield: 25–30 kilotons of TNT (100–130 TJ)

The Mark 11 nuclear bomb was an American nuclear bomb developed from the earlier Mark 8 nuclear bomb in the mid-1950s. Like the Mark 8, the Mark 11 was an earth-penetrating weapon, also known as a nuclear bunker buster bomb.

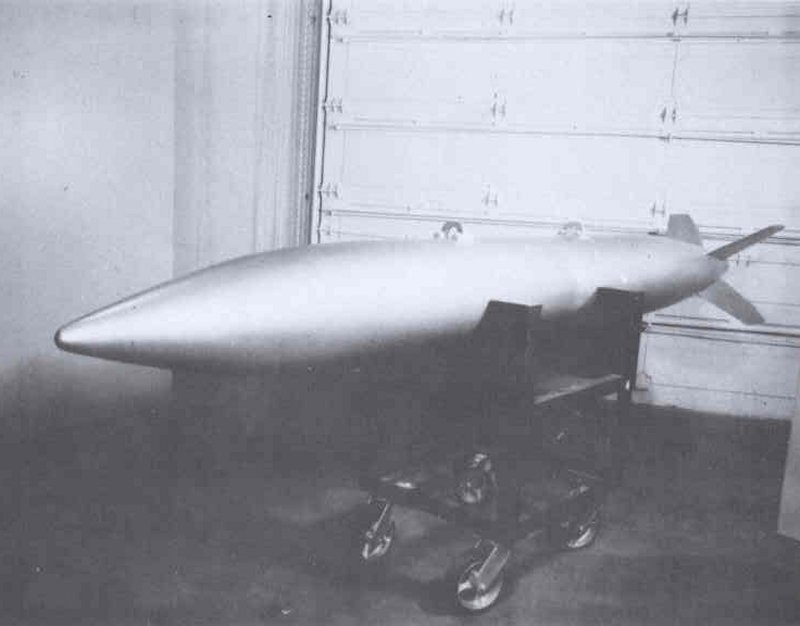
The Mk-11 nuclear bomb

== Description ==
As with the Mark 8, the Mark 11 was a gun-type nuclear bomb (see also: gun-type assembly weapon). It used a fixed large target assembly of highly enriched uranium (HEU), a gun-like barrel, and a powder charge and a uranium bullet or projectile fired up the barrel into the target.

The Mark 11 was first produced in 1956, and was in service until 1960. A total of 40 were produced, replacing but not expanding the quantity of Mark 8 bombs. It was 14 inches (36 cm) in diameter and 147 inches (3.7 m) long, with a weight of 3,210 to 3,500 pounds (1,460 to 1,590 kg). Yield was reportedly the same as the Mark 8, 25 to 30 kilotons.

Both the Mark 8 and the Mark 11 were compatible with the same fissile material "gun cores", but the Mark 11 had a much more modern external casing designed to penetrate further and more reliably into the ground. The Mark 8 had a flat nose, much like a torpedo. The Mark 11 nose was a pointed ogive shape.

The MK-11 also known as the MK-91 had variable yields by changing the target rings. A major difference over the MK-8 was that the MK-91 had an electric operated actuator as a safety device that would rotate a spline ring to prevent the projectile from being fired into the target rings. The MK-8 had no safety devices. Upon release from the delivery aircraft detonation would occur after the black powder fuzes burned 90-110 seconds. The MK-91 was a deep penetrating weapon in many surface materials. A "PHOEBE" polonium neutron initiator increased the nuclear detonation efficiency.

== See also ==
- List of nuclear weapons
- Mark 8 nuclear bomb
- Mark 1 Little Boy nuclear bomb

== Bibliography ==
- Complete list of all US nuclear weapons
