= Ho-203 cannon =

- Type: Aircraft cannon
- Place of origin: Empire of Japan

Service history
- Wars: World War II

Specifications
- Mass: 89 kg (196 lb)
- Length: 1,532 mm (60.3 in)
- Barrel length: 800 mm (31 in)
- Cartridge: 37 x 112R (475 g)
- Calibre: 37 mm (1.5 in)
- Action: Long recoil-operated
- Rate of fire: 120 rounds/min
- Muzzle velocity: 570 m/s (1,900 ft/s)
- Effective firing range: 900 m (3,000 ft)
- Feed system: 25-round drum

Ho-203 was a Japanese autocannon that saw considerable use during World War II. It was a long-recoil automation of the Year 11 Type direct-fire infantry gun. It was fed by a 25-round closed-loop ammunition belt. It was operationally used only as the nose gun of the Kawasaki Ki-45-KAIc and the Kawasaki Ki-102 heavy fighters of the Imperial Japanese Army Air Force.

== Specifications ==
- Caliber: 37 mm (1.45 in)
- Ammunition: 37×112mmR (475 g)
- Weight: 89 kg (196 lb)
- Rate of fire: 120 rounds/min
- Muzzle velocity: 570 m/s (1,870 ft/s)
- Effective range: 900 m (2,950 ft).

== Similar ordnance designs ==
- 37mm Bordkanone BK 3,7 (Nazi Germany)
- Oldsmobile M4 cannon (United States)

== See also ==
- Ho-5 cannon
- MK 108 cannon
- Ho-155 cannon
- Ho-204 cannon
- Ho-301 cannon
- Ho-401 cannon

== Bibliography ==
- Gustin, Emmanuel; Williams, Anthony G. (2003). Flying Guns: The Development of Aircraft Guns, Ammunition and Installations 1933–1945. Marlborough, UK: Airlife. ISBN 978-1-84037-227-4.
