= Ho-3 cannon =

20 mm autocannon

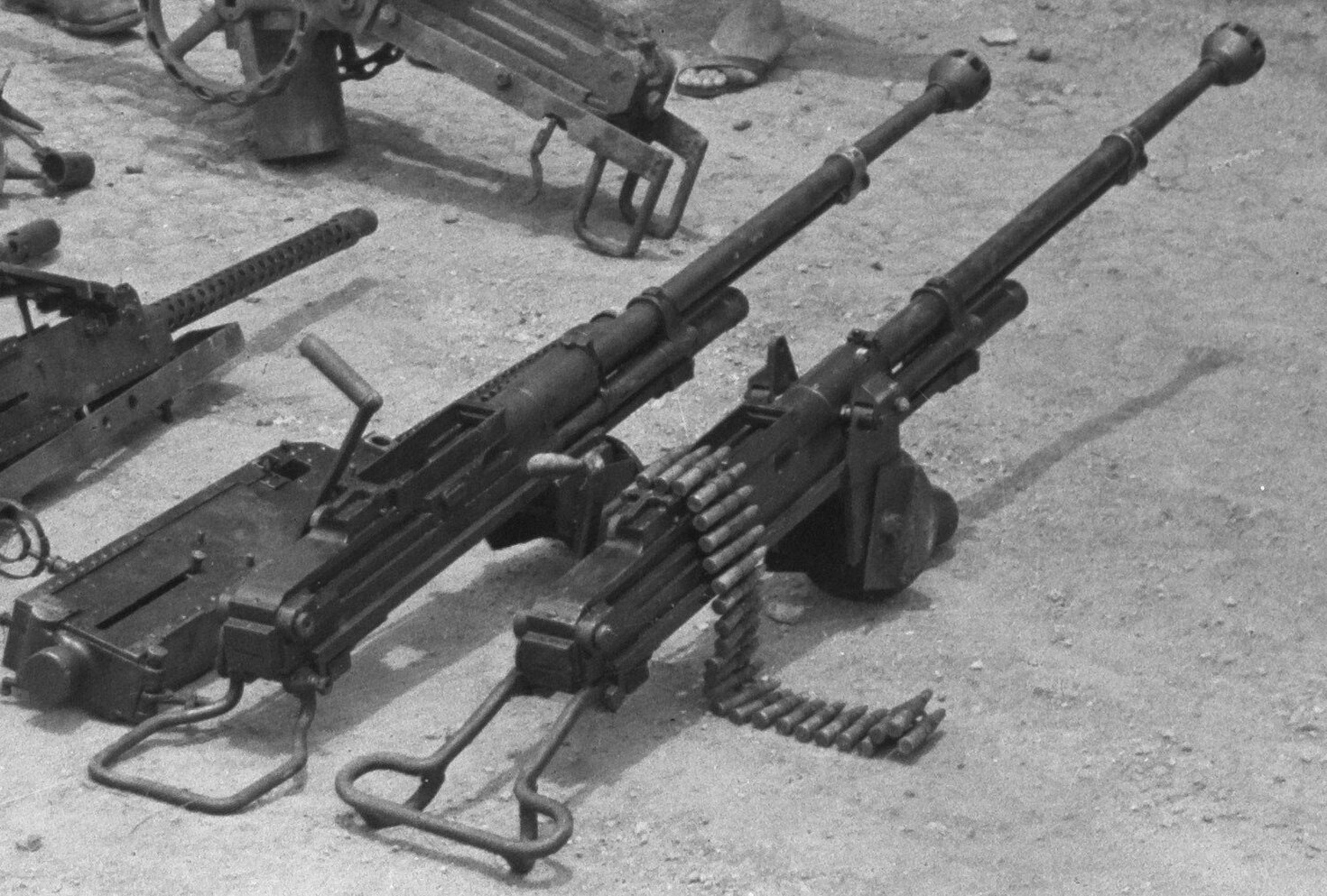
- Two dismounted Ho-3 cannons without the drum magazines. Note the ammunition belt.
- Type: Aircraft autocannon
- Place of origin: Empire of Japan

Service history
- Used by: Imperial Japanese Army Air Service; Imperial Japanese Navy Air Service
- Wars: World War II

Specifications
- Mass: 45 kg (99 lb)
- Length: 1,749 mm (68.9 in)
- Barrel length: 1,194 mm (47.0 in)
- Cartridge: 20x125mm (127)
- Calibre: 20 mm (0.79 in)
- Action: Short recoil-operated
- Rate of fire: 300-400 rounds/min
- Muzzle velocity: 830 m/s (2,700 ft/s)
- Feed system: 60-round drum magazine

Ho-3 was a Japanese autocannon used during World War II. It was a drum-fed improvement of the magazine-fed Ho-1 cannon, itself derived from the Type 97 antitank rifle. It was used by the Kawasaki Ki-45KAIc heavy fighter of the Imperial Japanese Army Air Force.

== Specifications ==
- Caliber: 20 mm (0.8 in)
- Ammunition: 20 x 125 (164 g)
- Weight: 43 kg (95 lb)
- Rate of fire: 300-400 rounds/min
- Muzzle velocity: 820 m/s (2,690 ft/s)

== Bibliography ==
- Gustin, Emmanuel; Williams, Anthony G. (2003). Flying Guns: The Development of Aircraft Guns, Ammunition and Installations 1933–1945. Marlborough, UK: Airlife. ISBN 978-1-84037-227-4.
