= Ho-1 cannon =

20 mm autocannon

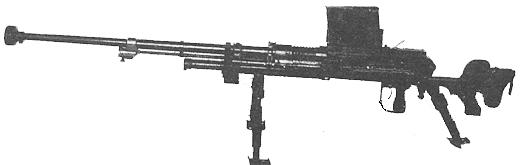
- A Type 97 20 mm anti-tank rifle, the base for the Ho-1 cannon.
- Type: Aircraft autocannon
- Place of origin: Empire of Japan

Service history
- Used by: Imperial Japanese Army Air Service; Imperial Japanese Navy Air Service
- Wars: World War II

Specifications
- Mass: 34 kg (75 lb)
- Length: 1,749 mm (68.9 in)
- Barrel length: 1,194 mm (47.0 in)
- Cartridge: 20x125mm (127)
- Calibre: 20 mm (0.79 in)
- Action: Short recoil-operated
- Rate of fire: 300-400 rounds/min
- Muzzle velocity: 820 m/s (2,700 ft/s)
- Feed system: 15-round box magazine

Ho-1 was a Japanese autocannon used during World War II, it was a Type 97 20 mm anti-tank rifle adapted for use in bomber turrets.

== Mounting ==
The cannon when fixed was known as the Ho-3, compared to its flexible brother the Ho-3 was fed with a 50-round double drum, while the Ho-1 was fed by a 15-round magazine.

== Specifications ==
- Caliber: 20 mm (0.8 in)
- Ammunition: 20 x 125 (164 g) Armor-piercing tracer or high-explosive incendiary
- Weight: 33 kg (72 lb)
- Rate of fire: 300-400 rounds/min
- Range 900 m
- Muzzle velocity: 820 m/s (2,690 ft/s)
