= Ho-301 cannon =

Ho-301 40 mm cannon
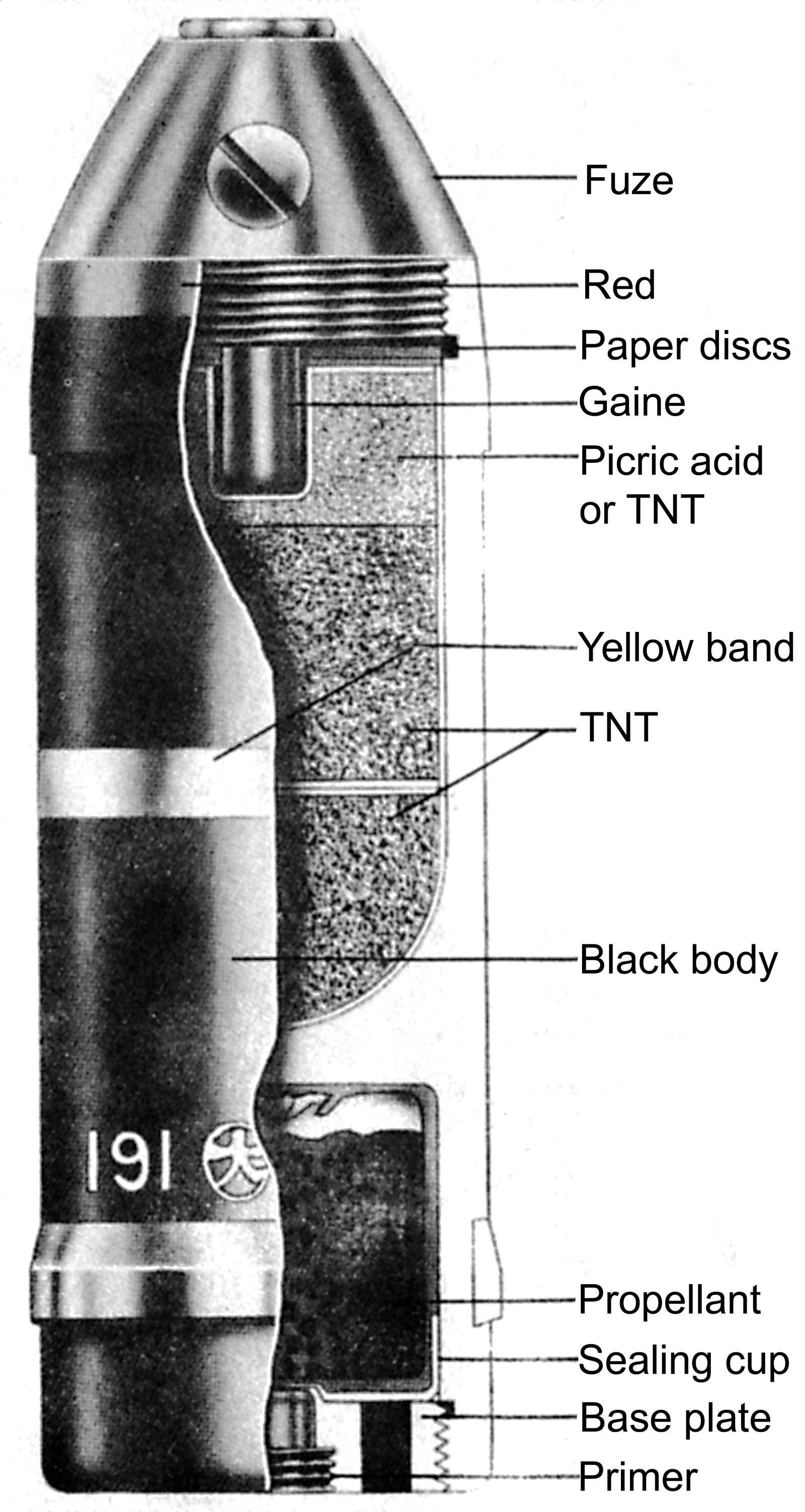
- A cutaway, showing the 40 mm caseless projectile.
- Type: Aircraft autocannon
- Place of origin: Japan

Service history
- Used by: Japan
- Wars: Second World War

Specifications
- Mass: 49 kg (108 lb)
- Length: 1,486 mm (58.5 in)
- Barrel length: 780 mm (31 in)
- Cartridge: 40 mm caseless (590g)
- Caliber: 40 mm (1.57 in)
- Action: API blowback
- Rate of fire: 475 rounds/min
- Muzzle velocity: 245 m/s (805 ft/s)
- Effective firing range: 150 meters (490 ft)
- Feed system: 10 round box

The Ho-301 was a Japanese 40 millimeter caliber autocannon that saw limited use during World War II, on Japanese Army Nakajima Ki-44 and Kawasaki Ki-45 KAI aircraft. It was unusual in using caseless ammunition. Although the effective range of the cannon was only 150 meters (490 ft), the Ho-301 was light and rapid-firing for its caliber.

The caseless design revolved around a specially designed projectile, that was in effect a small rocket. The round used an internal propellant chamber at the rear of the projectile containing a ten gram silk bag filled with smokeless powder. Drilled into the base plate of the round are twelve 3.8 millimeter diameter exhaust holes. The propellant chamber is sealed by a thin aluminum sealing cup, which covers the exhaust holes. When the primer is struck, the bag of propellant ignites, and the pressure rises until the aluminum cup bursts, allowing the exhaust gas to rush through the exhaust holes pushing the projectile forward. The propellant was exhausted before the projectile left the barrel.

Because of the low muzzle velocity (245 meters/second or about 804 ft/sec - equivalent to a moderately powerful air rifle) the weapon was only suited to attacking bombers; even here the extremely low muzzle velocity made it difficult to achieve hits from any position besides directly astern the target aircraft and well within the range of defensive counterfire.

The modern Russian VOG grenades fired by the GP-25 grenade-launcher use a similar principle.

== Ammunition specifications ==
- Length of projectile (fuzed): 129 mm
- Diameter of rotating band: 41 mm
- Diameter of body: 39 mm
- Wall thickness: 4 mm - 5 mm
- Weight: 0.590 kg
- Explosive content: 0.065 kg approx
- Fuze: Direct acting impact fuze

== See also ==
- MK 108 cannon
- High-Low System

== Citations ==
- Williams, Anthony G (2000). Rapid Fire. Airlife. ISBN 1-84037-435-7.
- TM 9-1985-5, Japanese Explosive Ordnance. Departments of the Army and the Airforce. 1953.
