= Mark 12 nuclear bomb =

American lightweight bomb (1954–1962)

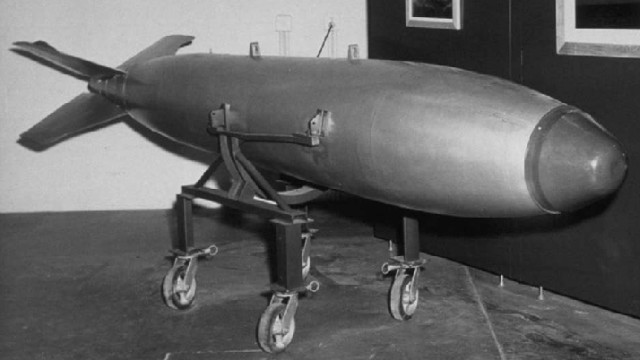
Mark-12 nuclear bomb

The Mark-12 nuclear bomb was a lightweight nuclear bomb designed and manufactured by the United States which was built starting in 1954 and which saw service from then until 1962.

The Mark-12 was notable for being significantly smaller in both size and weight compared to prior implosion-type nuclear weapons. For example, the overall diameter was only 22 inches (56 cm), compared to the immediately prior Mark-7 which had a 30 inches (76 cm) diameter, and the volume of the implosion assembly was only 40% the size of the Mark-7's.

There was a planned W-12 warhead variant which would have been used with the RIM-8 Talos missile, but it was cancelled prior to introduction into service.

== Specifications ==
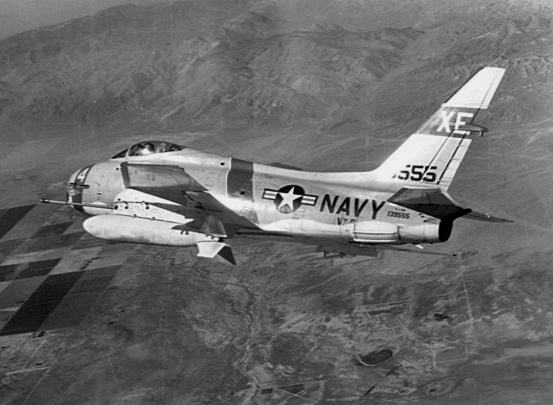
A North American FJ-4 Fury carrying a Mk 12 bomb (shape) over China Lake.

The complete Mark-12 bomb was 22 inches (56 cm) in diameter, 155 inches (3.94 m) long, and weighed 1,100 to 1,200 pounds (500 to 540 kg). It had a yield of 12 to 14 kilotonnes of TNT (50 to 59 TJ).

== Features ==
The Mark-12 has been speculated to have been the first deployed nuclear weapon to have used beryllium as a reflector-tamper inside the implosion assembly (see nuclear weapon design). It is believed to have used a spherical implosion assembly, levitated pit, and 92-point detonation. It used an automatic in-flight insertion system for safing, in which its nuclear material was kept inside of the weapon itself, but outside of the implosion sphere until a motor-driven mechanism activated by the plane crew signaled for it to be inserted.

== In popular culture ==
Though the weapon went out of service in 1962, it resurfaced in a fictional role in Tom Clancy's 1991 book The Sum of All Fears and the 2002 film, where the plot included an Israeli copy of the Mark-12 being lost by accident in 1973 during the Yom Kippur War in southern Syria near the Golan Heights, and then recovered by a terrorist organization.

== See also ==
- Nuclear weapon design
- Mark 7 nuclear bomb
- The Sum of All Fears
- The Sum of All Fears (film)
