= Ho-401 cannon =

- Type: Aircraft cannon
- Place of origin: Imperial Japanese army

Service history
- Wars: World War II

Specifications
- Mass: 150 kg (330 lb)
- Length: 2,000 mm (79 in)
- Barrel length: 800 mm (31 in)
- Cartridge: 57 x 121R (1,550 g)
- Calibre: 57 mm (2.2 in)
- Action: Short recoil-operated
- Rate of fire: 80 rounds/min
- Muzzle velocity: 495 m/s (1,620 ft/s)
- Feed system: 16-round drum

Ho-401 was a Japanese aircraft autocannon that saw limited, if any, use during World War II. It was a 57 mm caliber version of the 37 mm Ho-203 cannon. The cannon was used on the ground-attack, Kawasaki Ki-102b heavy fighter of the Imperial Japanese Army Air Force.

== Specifications ==
- Caliber: 57 mm (2.25 in)
- Ammunition: 57 x 121R (1,550 g)
- Weight: 150 kg (330 lb)
- Rate of fire: 80 rounds/min
- Muzzle velocity: 495 m/s (1,624 ft/s)

== Bibliography ==
- Gustin, Emmanuel; Williams, Anthony G. (2003). Flying Guns: The Development of Aircraft Guns, Ammunition and Installations 1933–1945. Marlborough, UK: Airlife. ISBN 978-1-84037-227-4.
