= Indonesian Air Force Academy =

Air Force Academy
- Akademi Angkatan Udara
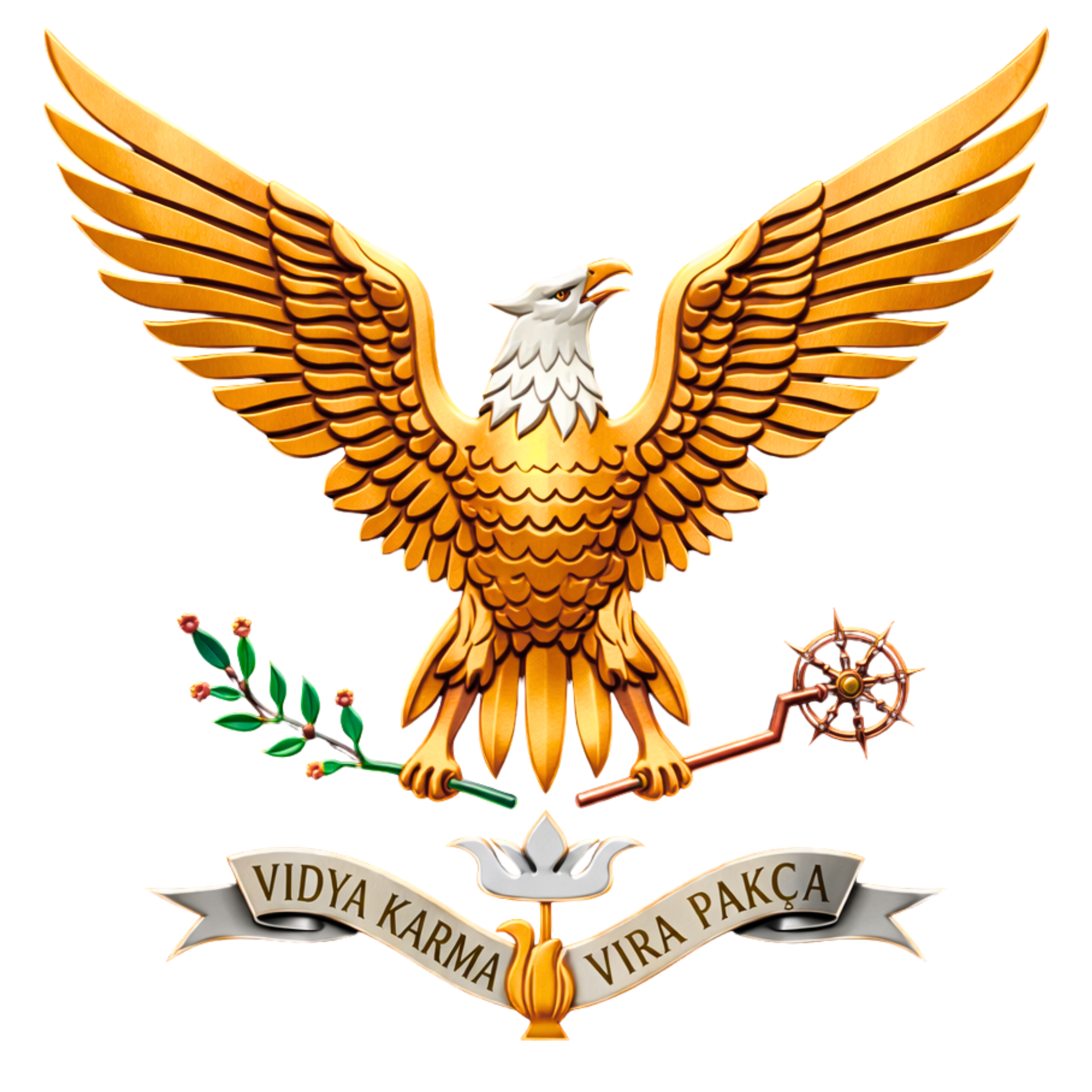
- Motto: Vidya Karma Vira Pakca
- Motto in English: Knowledge for deeds, brave to wards
- Type: Service academy
- Established: 1 August 1921 (Opening of the first aviation school in the Netherlands East Indies); 15 November 1945 (Official foundation)
- Affiliations: Indonesian National Armed Forces Academy System
- Superintendent: AVM Tatang Harlyansyah, S.E.
- Commandant of Cadets: AIRCDRE Fachri Adamy
- Students: 1,800 cadets
- Location: Yogyakarta, Special Region of Yogyakarta, Indonesia
- Colors: Blue and White
- Website: www.aau.ac.id

The Air Force Academy (Indonesian: Akademi Angkatan Udara or AAU) sometimes shortened as IDAFA, is a service academy of the Indonesian Air Force, the air force component of the Indonesian National Armed Forces Academy System or the AKABRI. Its campus is located in the Adisutjipto Air Force Base complex in Yogyakarta, Special Region of Yogyakarta and trains men and women to become commissioned officers of the Indonesian Air Force. Of all the service academies in Indonesia, despite the AAU having been opened in November 1945 (and thus is the second oldest), it has roots dating back to 1921.

== History ==
The academy's history began in 1921 in the Kalijati District of Subang Regency, West Java. The Dutch East Indies government officially opened the first military flying school in a makeshift airfield in the district for potential pilots in the Royal Netherlands East Indies Army Air Force (ML-KNIL) on 1 August 1921. The school moved to Bandung in 1939, and during Japanese occupation in 1942 there had been a number of native-born alumni who had previously trained in the Koninklijke Militaire Academie. One of them was the future first Chief of the Air Staff of the Air Force, then Flying Officer Suryadi Suryadarma of the Royal Netherlands East Indies Army Air Force who would in the independence era (and the Indonesian National Revolution) would be instrumental in the formation of the young air force. Assisted by Agustinus Adisucipto, another ML-KNIL veteran who served in the independence forces, the academy opened its doors on its current campus, what is now the Adisutjipto Air Force Base, on 15 November 1945, assuming its current name in 1965 and in the late 1960s adopted its present-day 4-year officer cadet course for air officer cadets.

=== Recent developments ===
Starting 2011, graduates of the academy were awarded a bachelor's degree (in applied defence sciences, Indonesian: Sarjana Sains Terapan Pertahanan) along with other military academy graduates. In 2017, the academy had its first female graduates.

=== History of the "Karbol" nickname of the cadets of the Cadet Wing ===
Lt. Col. Saleh Basarah, then the commander of 1st Training Wing, had just returned from the United States Air Force Academy as part of his tour of international air force academies in early 1963. It was there that he devised the inspiration of the nickname for the air force cadets in the AAU. Its fourth class cadets (freshmen) are sometimes referred to as "doolies," a term derived from the Greek word δοῦλος ("doulos") meaning "slave" or "servant."^{a} The Air Force officer, while on his visit, also dropped by General James H. "Jimmy" Doollitle, USAF, the hero of the Doolittle Raid of 1942, the very same year the Netherlands East Indies was occupied by Imperial Japanese military and naval forces, who was nicknamed "Mr.Doolly" and "The Doolles" by everyone, including the USAFA cadets and servicemen who served with him. Given that the air force officer had fellow officers who had been mentored by the late Group Captain Abdulrahman Saleh, who he regarded as one of the finest first generation officers of the air force and perished with several others when a transport plane was shot down by Dutch forces in 1947 in the current premises of the academy, he was bestowed posthumously, in honor of his sacrifice to the young air force and the republic, with the nickname Pak Karbol (Karbol shorthand for Intelligent Airman). When he later assumed command of the Air Education, Training and Doctrine Command in the mid-60s, he decided to use that Karbol name to become the official name for all cadets of the Air Force Academy.

== Current curriculum ==
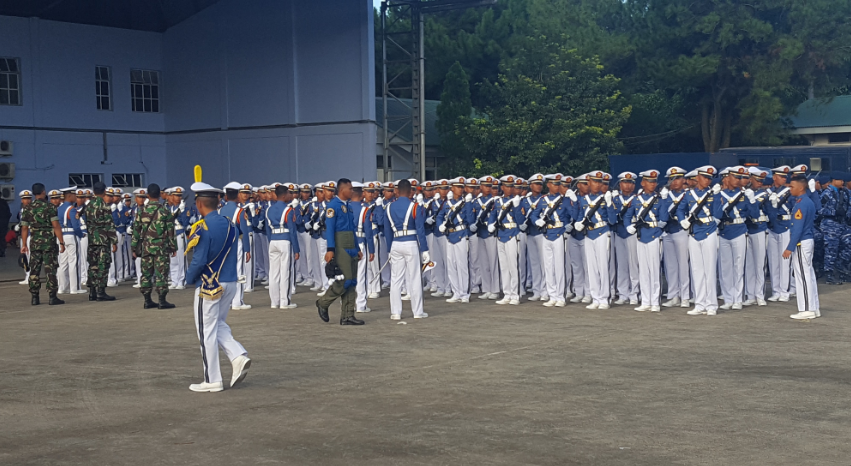
Indonesian air force academy cadets in formation before parade

The Air Force Academy, similar to most air force academies in the world, is a medium-sized, highly residential baccalaureate college, with a full-time, four-year undergraduate program that emphasizes instruction in the arts, sciences, and professions with no graduate program, preparing men and women to take on the challenge of being officers of the Air Force. The academy is accredited by the Ministry of Research, Technology and Higher Education. Cadets who passed the initial selection process will first attend a 1-year basic program in the Military Academy with students from the Army, Naval and Police academies, prior to 3 more years of specialized study in the Adisutjipto Air Force Base in Yogyakarta.

=== Undergraduate program – academic ===
The academic program consists of a structured core of subjects depending on the cadet's chosen specialty as a future Air Force officer, balanced between the arts and sciences, in his/her chosen speciality branch (combat commands, combat support, air materiel, aerospace engineering and administration). During the academic year, all cadets take formal classes in military theory, operations and leadership. Regardless of major, all cadets graduate with a Bachelor of Defense Science degree.

=== Undergraduate program – military ===
As all cadets are commissioned as second lieutenants upon graduation, aviation and leadership education is combined with academic instruction. Military training and discipline fall under the purview of the Office of the Commandant of Cadets. Entering freshmen, or 4th class cadets, are referred to as New Cadets, and enter the academy on Reception Day (in September) to start their military service training as future officers and are recognized as full cadets in a ceremony in January the following year alongside cadets from the other service branches and the National Police, where they receive ceremonial daggers. Additionally the cadets of the academy, which form the student body known as the Cadet Wing, given their duties as future officers of the Air Force, have additional emphasis on parachute training and for students aiming for pilot status, flight training with the 1st Training Wing's fixed-wing training aircraft to ensure preparedness to become future military aviators of the republic while for cadets aiming for service as officers in the ground establishments (Kopasgat, Air Defense and Military Police) these also receive additional training in their respective chosen specialty branches.

The academy also has links with the United States Air Force Academy, the Royal Military College of Canada and military academies in the Asia-Pacific. Thus it has a sizable number of foreign exchange cadets who graduate with a bachelor's degree and return to their countries of origin to serve as Second Lieutenants in their air forces. Given its Dutch heritage as a former Dutch colonial territory, the academy is also linked with the Koninklijke Militaire Academie in Breda, The Netherlands, the very academy where one of its founders had graduated.

== Cadet life ==
Cadets are not referred to as freshmen, sophomores, juniors, or seniors. Instead they are officially called fourth class, third class, second class, and first class cadets, or generally as Taruna-Taruni AAU or Karbol AAU (Air Cadets of the academy) as a whole. As the national air force college its cadets, male and female, come from all over Indonesia as well as foreign exchange cadets from many countries of the world. As part of their preparation for service in the Air Force, Cadets in the flying branches have the opportunity to take part in several airmanship activities to include soaring, parachuting (also done by potential cadets for service in the Paskhas corps), and powered flight. Select cadets are also granted leave if needed to explore historic Yogyakarta, the home city of the AAU.

Cadets are organized into a Cadet Wing with four Groups of 3 - 4 Cadet Squadrons each. Today the Cadet Groups are led by Cadet Flight Sergeants and Cadet Sergeants Major, similar to US service academies. In the past, these were staffed with military personnel until 2000 in keeping with the former Dutch practice of leading the 4th class cadets. Given its current curriculum and the joint service training program being done by the fourth class cadets the Groups are manned only by the third, second, and first class cadets in order of increasing precedence. The Air Force Academy cadet sabre, granted by the Chief of Staff of the Air Force, is carried by first class (senior) cadets in command positions in the Cadet Wing with Cadet Sergeant Major rank. All graduates are normally entitled to own no more than two sabres after their commissioning: one for personal use and one to be given as a gift.

=== Ranks of the Corps ===
- Prajurit Taruna (Air Officer Cadet), 1st year (4 months)
- Kopral Taruna (Corporal Cadet), 1st year (8 months)
- Sersan Taruna (Sergeant Cadet), 2nd year, most academy cadets begin their studies in this rank after their joint service training the year before
- Sersan Mayor Dua Taruna (2nd Sergeant Major Cadet), 3rd year - held by platoon commanders
- Sersan Mayor Satu Taruna (1st Sergeant Major Cadet), 4th year - held by company and battalion commanders

=== Organization of the Cadet Wing ===
- Wing HQ
  - Commandant
  - Assistant Commandant
  - Command Sergeant Major
- 1st to 4th Cadet Groups
- Support Group
- Special Troops Group
- Gita Dirgantara Cadet Drum and Bugle Corps
- Regimental Band of the Air Force Academy
- Dependencies
- Academy Museum

== Notes ==
^aAlthough the official literature from the US Air Force Academy still uses the word "doolie" extensively, the term was never particularly popular with cadets and fell into disuse. The term used more often is "SMACK" — originally a nonspecific derogatory term, but now a backronym for "Soldier Minus Ability Courage and Knowledge" or "Soldier Minus Ability Coordination and Knowledge." Other terms for fourth class cadets include "Squat," "Wad" (an acronym of 'Wise-Assed Doolie'), "Tool," and "Wedge" (the simplest tool.) Don Hall, USAFA Class of '76, created the popular character "Waldo F. Dumbsquat, whose Svejk-like innocence and good intentions overcome his abysmal ineptitude.

== See also ==
- Indonesian Military Academy
- Indonesian Naval Academy
- Indonesian Air Force
- Indonesian National Armed Forces
