= Air raids on Semarang–Salatiga–Ambarawa =

1947 Indonesian air strike during the National Revolution

- Part of the Indonesian National Revolution
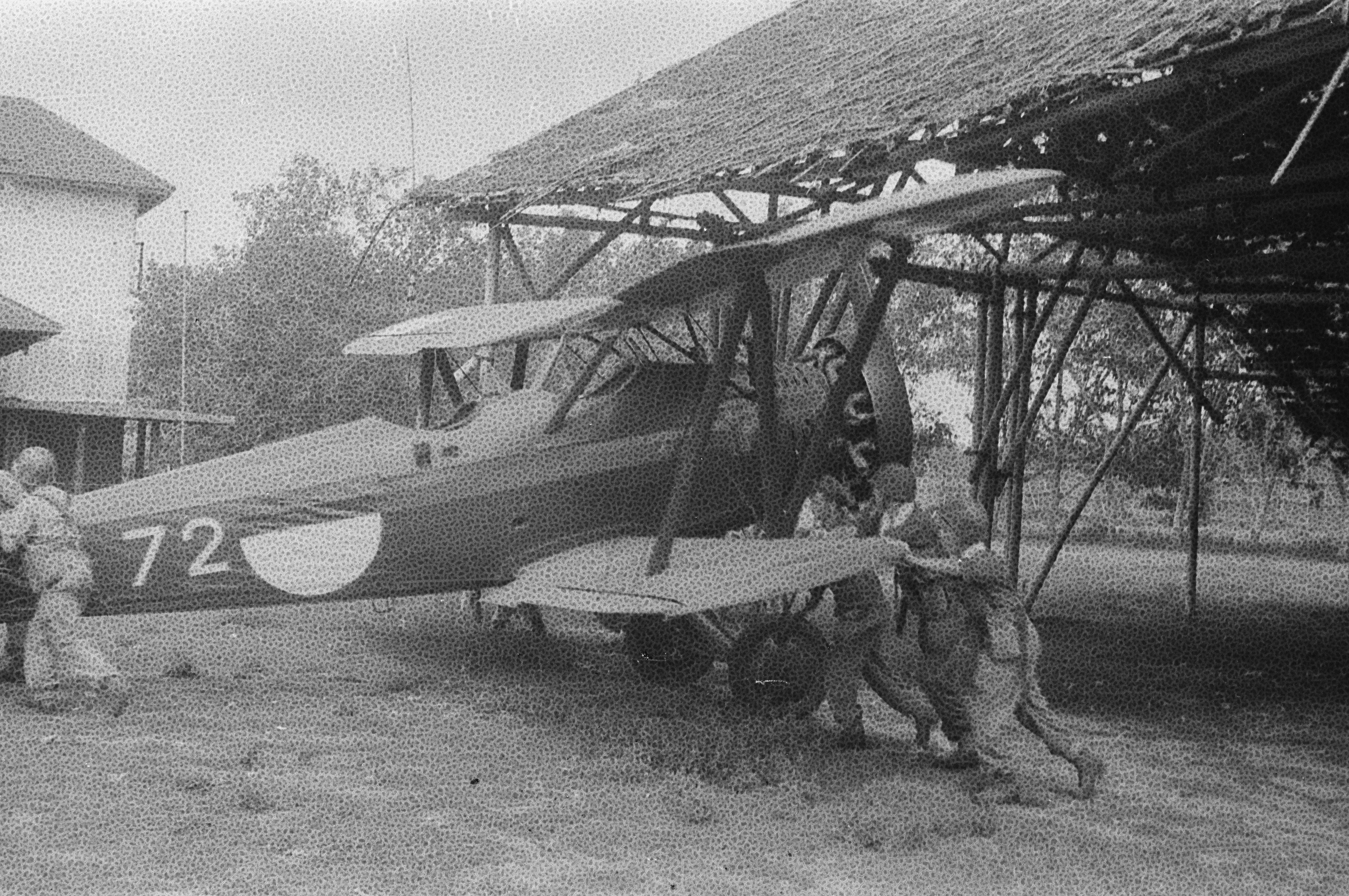
- An Indonesian Air Force Yokosuka K5Y, similar to those used during the air raids
Date	29 July 1947
Location	Semarang, Salatiga, and Ambarawa
Result	Indonesian victory; Indonesian operational bombing success; 1947 Yogyakarta Dakota incident

Belligerents
Indonesia	Netherlands

Commanders and leaders
Suryadi Suryadarma; Halim Perdanakusuma	unknown

Units involved
Indonesian Air Force	Royal Netherlands East Indies Army

Strength
2 K5Y1 "Willow"; 1 Ki-51 "Sonia"	unknown

Casualties and losses
No casualties	7 killed

The air raids on Semarang, Salatiga, and Ambarawa was an air strike launched by the Indonesian Air Force on early hours of 29 July 1947 against Dutch military targets located in the Central Javanese town of Ambarawa and cities of Semarang and Salatiga during the Indonesian National Revolution.

It was the first military operation conducted by the Indonesian Air Force. 29 July, the date of the air raids and the 1947 Yogyakarta Dakota incident, is commemorated in Indonesia as the "Air Force Service Day" (Hari Bakti Angkatan Udara).

== Background ==
On 21 July 1947, the Dutch forces launched Operation Product, a military offensive aimed to capture economically productive areas of the Indonesian Republican-held territories in the islands of Java and Sumatra, in violation of the Linggadjati Agreement previously signed in 1946.

As part of the offensive, the Royal Netherlands East Indies Army Air Force (ML-KNIL) launched Operation Pelikaan to attack Indonesian airfields and destroy aircraft belonging to the Indonesian Air Force, and so ensuring that no Indonesian aircraft would disrupt the offensive. 24 Indonesian aircraft were destroyed on 21–23 July period and ground facilities at several Indonesian airfields were disabled.

Seeing the firsthand destructive results of Operation Pelikaan, several Indonesian Air Force cadets were determined to take revenge by proposing to launch air strikes against Dutch-held territory. The idea was initially rejected by the Air Force commander Air Commodore Suryadi Suryadarma and one of his deputy then Group Captain Halim Perdanakusuma, although they later reluctantly approved the proposal.

== Mission ==
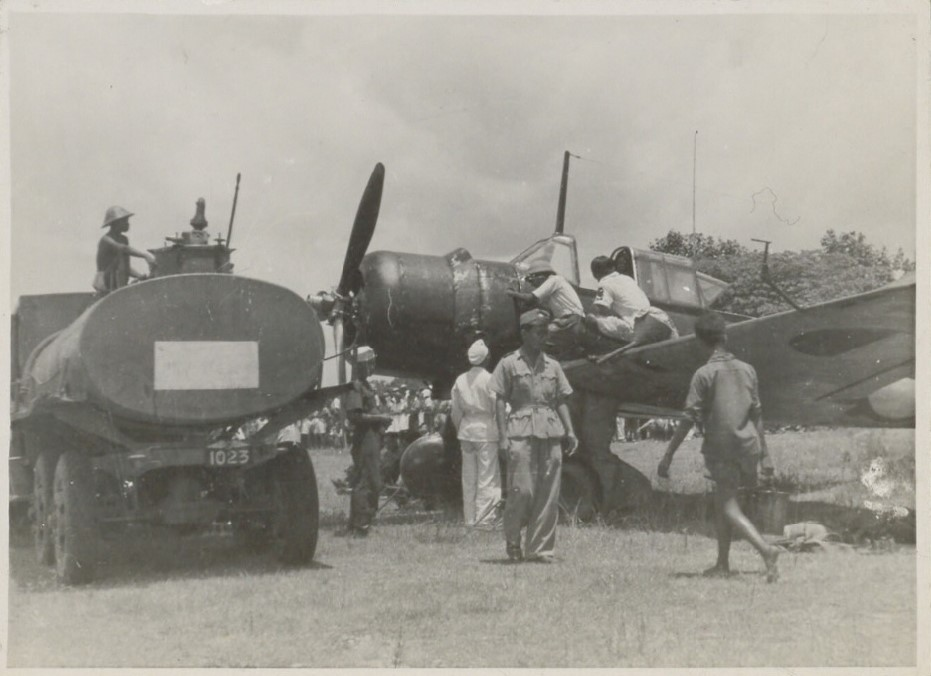
An Indonesian Air Force Ki-51 being refueled from a truck

Halim assigned the H-Hour of the raid at 05:00 in the morning of 29 July 1947, with Semarang and Salatiga as the targets. Four surviving aircraft at Maguwo airfield in the outskirts of Yogyakarta were allocated for this mission, which were two Yokosuka K5Y1 "Willow", one Mitsubishi Ki-51 "Sonia", and one Nakajima Ki-43 "Oscar". The two K5Y1s, to be flown by Flight Cadets Sutarjo Sigit and Suharnoko Harbani with Sutarjo and Kaput respectively as rear gunners, were assigned to target Salatiga, while Semarang were assigned to the Ki-51, flown by Flight Cadets Mulyono and rear gunner Dulrachman, and escorted by Ki-43 flown by Flight Cadet Bambang Saptoaji. At 19:00 on 28 July, the four pilot cadets were briefed on the mission by Suryadarma and Halim.

During the preparation on the early hours of 29 July, it was found that the machine gun synchronization system in the Ki-43 could not be repaired in time, and the raids were to go ahead with three aircraft instead. Problem also hampered Sutarjo Sigit's K5Y1, as the defensive machine gun could not be mounted on the aircraft.

The mission went ahead as planned, with aircraft departing Maguwo airfield at 05:00. Ki-51 flown by Mulyono was the first to take off, followed by K5Y1s of Sutarjo and Suharnoko.

During the flight to Salatiga, Suharnoko aircraft was separated from Sutarjo. Later Suharnoko saw a vast lake, and believing he was above Ambarawa, dropped his bombs and continued to rendezvous with Sutarjo. Above Salatiga, Sutarjo only managed to drop one of his bomb, which hit a local hospital and failed to explode, with another bomb dropped somewhere else due to technical malfunction. Mulyono were able to reach Semarang and dropped two bombs over the Port of Tanjung Emas, killing seven people.

All three aircraft returned safely to Maguwo and were quickly camouflaged to prevent them from being spotted by Dutch aircraft.

== Aftermath ==
As a response to the raids, the No. 120 Squadron of Dutch East Indies Army Air Force launched offensive counter air sorties against Indonesian airfields of Maguwo and Maospati. During one of the sorties, two Dutch P-40 Kittyhawks spotted a C-47 on landing approach to Maguwo and shot it down, culminating on the 1947 Yogyakarta Dakota incident.

== In popular culture ==
The air raids is one of the main plot of the 1981 film Serangan Fajar.

The 2021 Indonesian film Cadet 1947 was heavily inspired and dramatized retelling of the 29 July 1947 air raids and its participants.
