= Abdul Rachman Saleh Airport =

Airport in Malang, East Java, Indonesia

Abdul Rachman Saleh Airport Bandar Udara Abdul Rachman Saleh
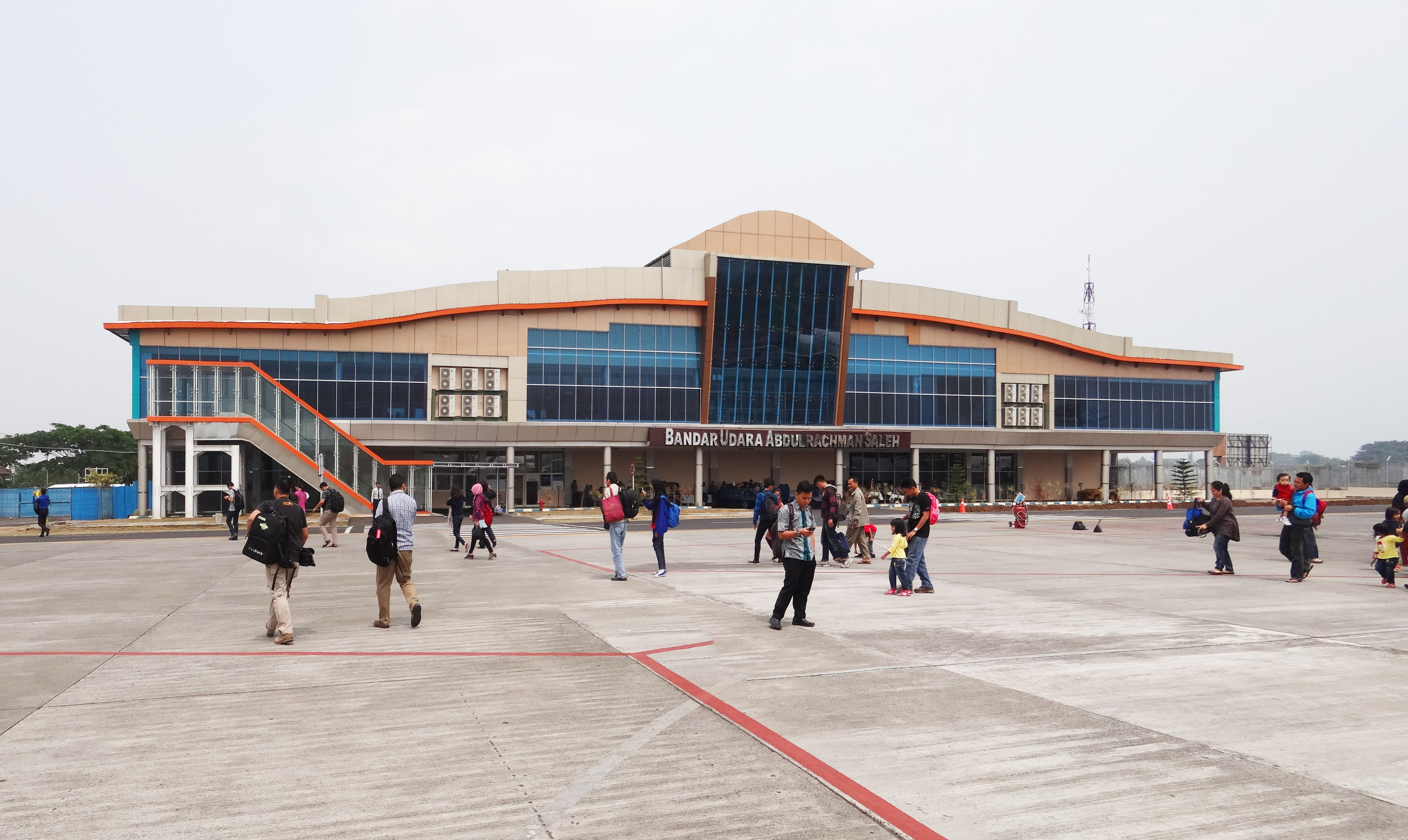
- IATA: MLG; ICAO: WARA

Summary
- Airport type: Public / Military
- Owner: Indonesian Air Force
- Operator: East Java Provincial Government
- Serves: Malang
- Location: Pakis, Malang Regency, East Java, Indonesia
- Built: 1937; 89 years ago
- Time zone: WIB (UTC+07:00)
- Elevation AMSL: 526 m (1,726 ft)
- Coordinates: 07°55′42″S 112°42′48″E

Map
- Location of airport in Java / Indonesia MLG/WARA (Indonesia)

Runways
Direction	Length		Surface
Direction	ft	m	Surface
17/35	8,202	2,500	Asphalt
~~17L/35R~~	~~4,921~~	~~1,500~~	~~Asphalt~~

Statistics (2024)
- Passengers: 511,524 (▲7.43%)
- Cargo (tonnes): 257.81 (▼4.98%)
- Aircraft movements: 3,854 (▲9.61%)
- Source: DGCA

Abdul Rachman Saleh Airport (IATA: MLG, ICAO: WARA) is a domestic airport serving Malang, the second-largest city in East Java, Indonesia. It is named after Abdul Rachman Saleh (1909–1947), an Indonesian aviator and physiologist, and a recognized national hero who was killed when his aircraft was shot down by Dutch forces while landing at Maguwo Airfield (now Adisutjipto Airport) in Yogyakarta during the Indonesian National Revolution. Located approximately 9.6 km (6.0 miles) from Malang city center, the airport serves as the main air gateway to the city and its surrounding areas. As of 2026, commercial passenger services are limited, with only a single route to Jakarta.

The airport is currently one of the few airports in Indonesia managed by a regional government, in this case the East Java Provincial Government, rather than by InJourney Airports or the Ministry of Transportation's Directorate General of Civil Aviation. Despite its civilian operations, the airport's land is entirely owned by the Indonesian Air Force, with the civilian terminal operating as an enclave within the military facility. In addition to serving commercial flights, the airport shares its infrastructure with Abdul Rachman Saleh Air Force Base, a Type A airbase of the Indonesian Air Force. The base hosts four squadrons: the 4th Light Transport Squadron, operating the CASA C-212 Aviocar; the 21st Combat Squadron, operating the Embraer EMB 314 Super Tucano; the 32nd Heavy Transport Squadron, operating the C-130 Hercules; and the 22nd Technical Squadron.

== History ==
=== Colonial era ===
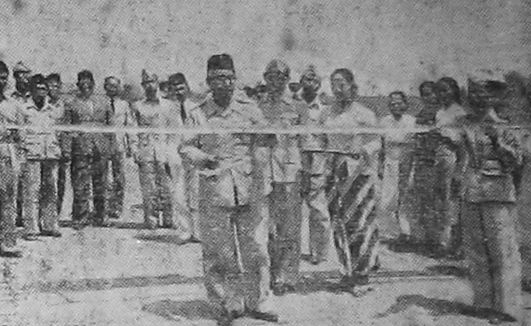
Opening of Abdul Rachman Saleh Air Force Base, 1952

Abdul Rachman Saleh Airport was originally built by the Dutch colonial government between 1937 and 1940 as a military airbase for the Royal Netherlands East Indies Army Air Force (ML-KNIL). It was developed alongside other key airfields in Java, including Maospati Airfield (now Iswahyudi Air Base) in Magetan, Panasan Airfield (now Adisumarmo International Airport) in Solo, and Maguwo Airfield (now Adisutjipto Airport) in Yogyakarta. At the time, the airport was known as Singosari Airfield, named after the nearby town of Singosari, located about 4 miles to the northwest. Strategically located at the foot of the mountain, the airfield benefits from natural fortifications that make it less visible from the air. Fog frequently obscures the area, making it difficult for enemy aircraft to detect the airbase when passing overhead. Recognizing its defensive advantages, the Dutch established an air defense zone in the area. To support military operations, the Dutch government constructed a long runway capable of accommodating large military aircraft. This airfield was constructed with two parallel runways, each measuring 4,000 feet in length, which were camouflaged to avoid aerial observation. The area was disguised to resemble farmland, complete with railway tracks and barricades to protect parked aircraft. Two hangars were also built and painted with camouflage to blend in with the surrounding vegetation.

When the Pacific War of World War II broke out in late 1941, the airfield became the home base of the IIe Vliegtuiggroep (VIG-II, 2nd Air Group) of the ML-KNIL. The unit comprised one afdeling (division) operating twelve Martin B-10 bombers with three reserve aircraft, as well as a patrouille (patrol unit) equipped with three additional Martin B-10s and one reserve aircraft. The patrol unit was mobilized at Kalijati Airfield from flight school personnel on 10 December 1941 and placed under the command of the Netherlands Naval Aviation Service (MLD). When the Japanese launched their invasion of the Dutch East Indies, the airfield became a joint Allied base, with aircraft of the United States Army Air Forces (USAAF) operating from it in support of Dutch forces. On 20 February 1942, the Tainan Air Group of the Imperial Japanese Navy Air Service carried out a raid on Singosari Airfield using nine Mitsubishi A6M Zero fighters, destroying five USAAF B-17 Flying Fortress aircraft and injuring several airmen. By early March, as the situation became increasingly untenable, most Allied aircraft were withdrawn to Broome, Australia. The airfield was ultimately captured by Japanese forces in late March 1942.

Following its capture, the airfield was used as a base by the Imperial Japanese Navy Air Service. Thousands of Allied prisoners of war were forced to pave the grass airstrip with tarmac and repair damaged sections of the facility, under threat of execution by their Japanese captors if they refused to comply.

Following Japan’s surrender in August 1945, the base was taken over by the Tentara Keamanan Rakyat (People’s Security Army), the predecessor of the Indonesian National Armed Forces, along with a number of remaining Japanese aircraft. The Japanese handed over weapons belonging to the airfield security detachment, anti-aircraft guns, and 105 aircraft, of which 12 were airworthy while the rest were damaged. At the time, the facility was known as Bugis Airfield. Some of the captured Japanese aircraft were later repaired and used to distribute propaganda leaflets. Many of the Indonesian aircraft stationed at Bugis Airfield were destroyed on the ground during Dutch air raids carried out as part of Operation Product in July 1947. Some of the surviving aircraft later took part in an attack on Dutch positions in Ambarawa, Central Java, on 29 July 1947. The airfield itself was captured by Dutch forces on 30 July 1947 following a major offensive. The airfield was subsequently reused as a base by the ML-KNIL for the remainder of the Indonesian National Revolution.

=== Post-independence era ===
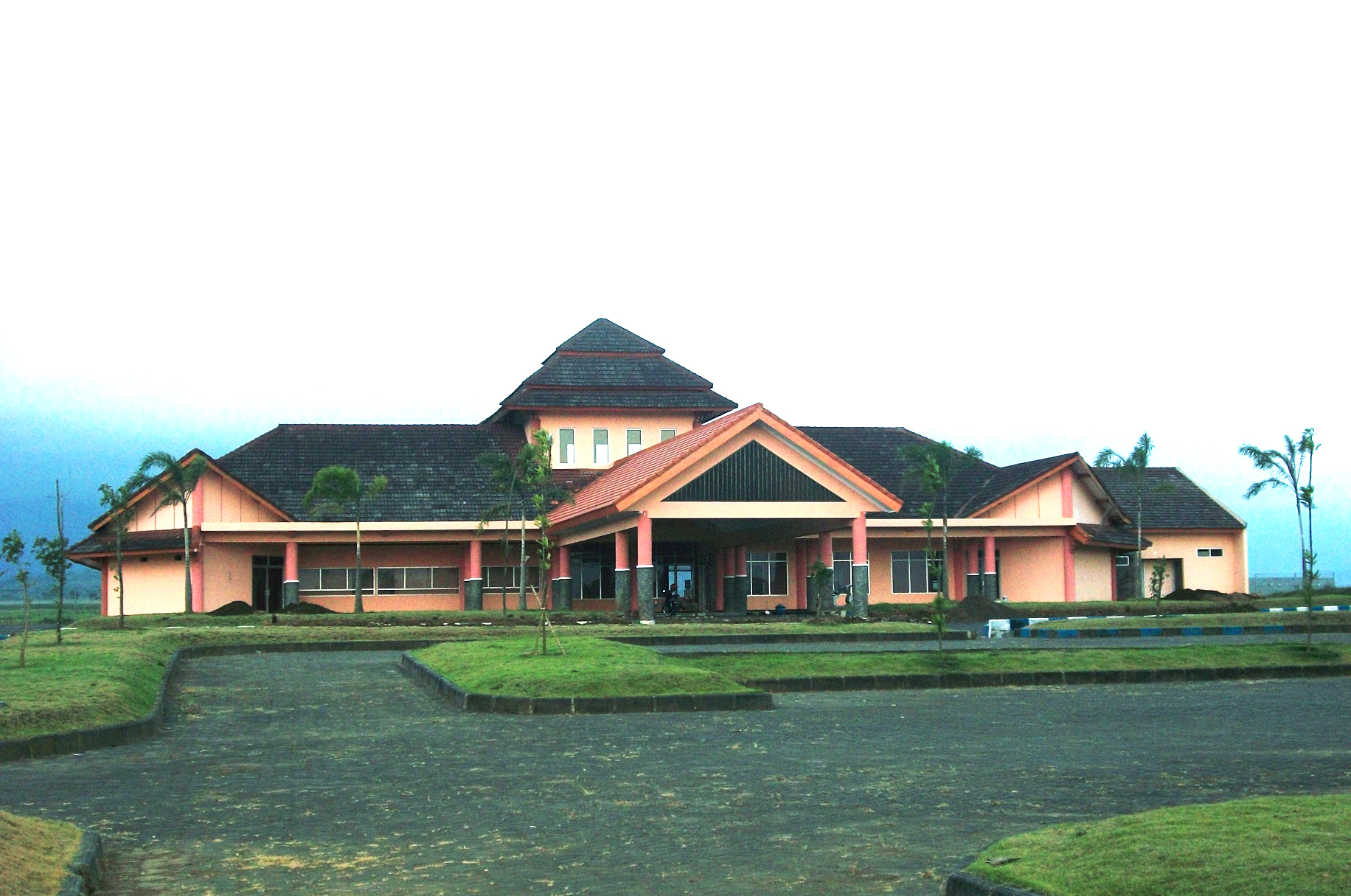
Former terminal, 2008

Following the Dutch recognition of Indonesian sovereignty, Dutch forces withdrew from the airfield. A handover ceremony between the ML-KNIL and the Indonesian Air Force (AURI) was held on 17 April 1950. In 1952, the airbase was officially renamed Abdul Rachman Saleh Air Force Base, in honor of Abdul Rachman Saleh, a national hero from the revolution and one of the pioneers of the Indonesian Air Force. For the following years, the airbase was used exclusively for military operations.

In 1982, the airport began serving commercial flights operated by Merpati Nusantara Airlines on the Jakarta–Malang–Denpasar route, but the service was discontinued shortly afterward. Commercial operations did not resume until 1994, when the airport began serving as a secondary airport to alleviate congestion at Juanda International Airport in Surabaya. At the time, Merpati Nusantara Airlines resumed operations at the airport using Fokker F28 aircraft. However, frequent flight delays between 1996 and 1997 led to a decline in passenger demand, with the airline's load factor falling to 14.54%. As a result, Merpati Nusantara Airlines officially ceased all scheduled services to the airport on 16 June 1997.

The airport was temporarily closed in October 2009 due to significant runway damage. It reopened after repairs were completed, funded by Rp 130 million from three local authorities.

From 25 May 2005, the airport's civil aviation services operated from a passenger terminal located within the Indonesian Air Force base complex. On 30 December 2011, however, civil flight operations were relocated to a separate passenger terminal outside the air base's operational area.

== Facilities and development ==
Due to overcrowding caused by increasing passenger traffic, construction of a new passenger terminal began in 2011. After four years of construction, the new terminal began operations on 28 May 2015 and was officially inaugurated by then-Minister of Transportation Ignasius Jonan on 25 June 2015. The two-storey terminal houses check-in counters on the first floor and departure facilities on the second floor. It is equipped with various passenger facilities, including lounges, a prayer room (mushola), designated waiting areas, toilets, and X-ray screening machines. Its boarding gates can accommodate up to 900 passengers during peak periods. The former terminal remains in use exclusively for arriving passengers. The construction of the new terminal cost approximately Rp41 million in total. Following the inauguration of the new departure terminal, the Ministry of Transportation also planned the construction of a new dedicated arrival terminal. A budget of approximately Rp70 billion was allocated for the project, which would include the construction of the new terminal, an extension of the runway, and the expansion of the apron.

In 2007, the airport's main runway (17/35) measured 1,987 by 40 meters. By late 2012, it had been extended to 2,300 meters, and by October 2022, it had been further extended to 2,500 by 40 meters. The second runway (17L/35R) measures 1,500 by 30 meters. With its current runway length, the airport can accommodate narrow-body aircraft such as the Boeing 737 and Airbus A320. Plans are underway to further extend the main runway to 3,000 meters to accommodate larger wide-body aircraft such as the Airbus A330 and potentially support the introduction of international flights. Approximately Rp200 billion is expected to be invested in the airport's further development. The airport also features a 22,000-square-meter aircraft parking area measuring 200 by 110 meters. The airport is also equipped with an instrument landing system (ILS), allowing it to accommodate flights during nighttime and in reduced-visibility conditions.

=== New airport ===
Because the airport shares its facilities with the Indonesian Air Force, which significantly restricts commercial flight operations, proposals have been made to construct a new airport in Bantur District, southern Malang. The proposed airport would occupy approximately 600 hectares of land owned by the Indonesian Navy and currently used by the Indonesian Marine Corps for training. A total investment of around Rp4 trillion was initially planned for the construction of the airport and its supporting infrastructure. The proposed airport is also expected to accommodate international flights and is planned to have an annual passenger capacity of up to 24 million. Its location, farther from Mount Bromo and Mount Semeru, is expected to provide a more reliable alternative to Abdul Rachman Saleh Airport, which has periodically been forced to close due to volcanic ash from the eruptions of both volcanoes.

The new airport is expected to serve not only the Malang metropolitan area but also surrounding regions, including Blitar, Kediri, Lumajang, Pasuruan, and Tulungagung. The detailed engineering design and feasibility study were originally scheduled to begin in 2017, followed by physical construction in 2019. However, physical construction did not commence as originally scheduled. In 2024, the proposal to construct the new airport resurfaced under the proposed name Purboyo Airport.

== Airlines and destinations ==
Airlines	Destinations
Batik Air	Jakarta–Halim Perdanakusuma, Jakarta–Soekarno-Hatta
Citilink	Jakarta–Soekarno-Hatta

== Statistics ==
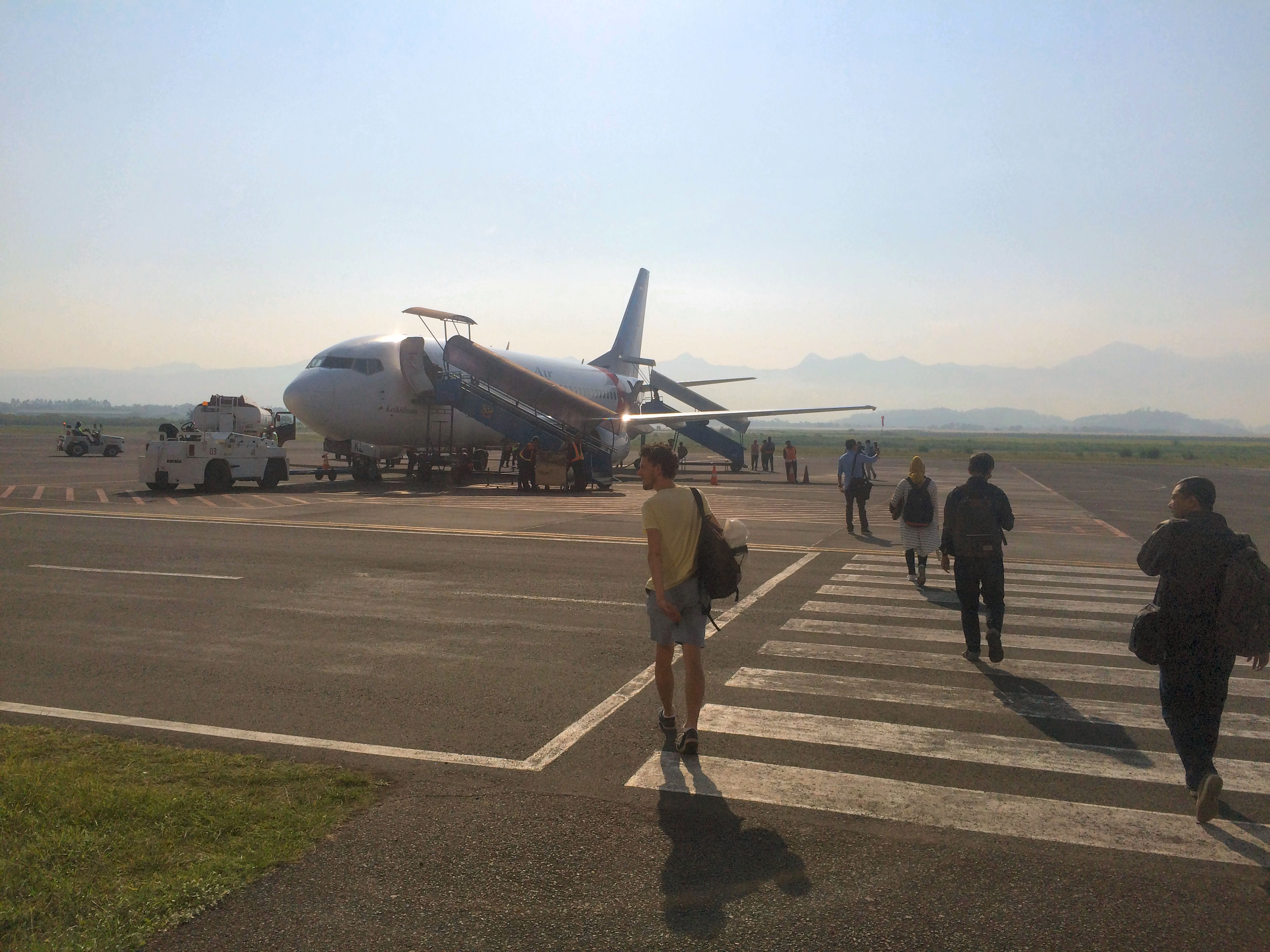
A Sriwijaya Air Boeing 737-300 at Abdul Rachman Saleh Airport

Annual passenger numbers and aircraft statistics
Year	Passengers handled	Passenger % change	Cargo (tonnes)	Cargo % change	Aircraft movements	Aircraft % change
2008	191,257	Steady	270.55	Steady	1,712	Steady
2009	262,187	▲37.09	494.52	▲82.78	2,540	▲48.36
2010	363,645	▲38.70	1,464.38	▲196.12	3,266	▲28.58
2011	464,672	▲27.78	1,125.58	▼23.14	4,558	▲39.56
2012	511,280	▲10.03	1,607.91	▲42.85	4,790	▲5.09
2013	525,601	▲2.80	2,343.68	▲45.76	4,827	▲0.77
2014	623,071	▲18.54	629.11	▼73.16	1,281	▼73.46
2015	613,126	▼1.60	2,194.79	▲248.87	5,066	▲295.47
2016	855,826	▲39.58	1,963.11	▼10.56	6,459	▲27.50
2017	1,838,251	▲114.79	3,234.47	▲64.76	13,396	▲107.40
2018	1,332,903	▼27.49	2,803.80	▼13.32	10,004	▼25.32
2019	893,813	▼32.94	815.13	▼70.93	7,244	▼27.59
2020	282,975	▼68.34	201.94	▼75.23	3,030	▼58.17
2021	155,829	▼44.93	138.28	▼31.52	1,564	▼48.38
2022	350,995	▲125.24	160.42	▲16.01	2,549	▲62.98
2023	476,127	▲35.65	271.32	▲69.13	3,516	▲37.94
2024	511,524	▲7.43	257.81	▼4.98	3,854	▲9.61
^{Source: DGCA, BPS}

== Accidents and incidents ==
- On 18 January 1967, a Grumman HU-16A Albatross operated by the Air Force of the Republic of Indonesia (AURI), military registration 302, en route to Malang-Abdul Rachman Saleh Airport (MLG/WARA), was reported as missing with the loss of all 19 occupants on board.
- On 1 November 2007, at 13:24 Western Indonesia Time (WIB) (06:24 UTC), a Boeing 737–230 operated by Mandala Airlines as flight number RI260 (also reported as MDL 260) (serial number: 22137/788), registration PK-RIL, was written off following substantial damage resulting from a severe heavy landing on runway 35 at Abdul Rachman Saleh Airport. Originating from Jakarta-Soekarno-Hatta International Airport (CGK/WIII) on a scheduled passenger service, the subsequent investigation found that the pilot failed to observe the excessive 1,000 feet per minute rate of descent during the approach for landing, thus creating an unstabilised approach. The 45-year-old male pilot in command was criticised for further failing to respond to any of the audible warnings from any of ground proximity warning systems (GPWS), particularly the initial "Sink Rate, Sink Rate" and the three subsequent "Pull Up, Pull Up" aural warnings. Data recovered from the flight data recorder revealed that after a rate of descent of 1,750 feet per minute, the aircraft bounced around 20 feet (6 metres) following the severe heavy landing, and that there was no attempt by the crew to initiate a go around, which is the normal recovery action following a heavy landing. In mitigation, the flight crew were hampered with "marginal visual meteorological conditions" during their approach, specifically heavy rain and reduced visibility. Of the 94 total persons onboard (two pilots, three cabin crew, and 89 passengers), there were no fatalities and no serious injuries.
- On 16 November 2023, the two Indonesian Air Force Embraer EMB-314E Super Tucano (A-29) aircraft, operated by Skadron Udara 21, crashed under unknown circumstances on the slopes of Mount Bromo, near Keduwung Village, Puspo District, Pasuruan, East Java. The aircraft (TT-3103 and TT-3111) were part of a four-ship formation that had departed Malang-Abdul Rachman Saleh Air Base. At the time of the accident they were flying in a box formation. The pilots of both planes died in the crash.
