= Johny Indo =

Indonesian actor (1948–2020)

- Born: Johanes Hubertus Eijkenboom; November 6, 1948; Garut, Indonesia
- Died: January 26, 2020 (aged 71); Jakarta, Indonesia
- Other names: Johny Indo; H. Umar Billah
- Occupations: Actor, Islamic preacher
- Years active: 1987–2020
- Parents: Mathias Eijkenboom (father); Sophia (mother)

H. Umar Billah bin Muhammad Yahya, born Johanes Hubertus Eijkenboom, or more popularly known as Johny Indo (November 6, 1948 – January 26, 2020), was an Indonesian actor.

== Biography ==
Johny Indo was born with the name Johanes Hubertus Eijkenboom to a Dutch father and an Indonesian mother. His father was Mathias Eijkenboom (later Muhammad Yahya), a Dutch soldier who came to Indonesia during the first Dutch Military Aggression, July–August 1947.

Johny Indo was originally known as a gold shop robber in Jakarta and its surroundings in the 1970s era which was carried out during the day with his Pachinko group (City China Troops). Johny Indo's most famous action was to rob a gold shop in Cikini, Central Jakarta, in 1979.

Johny Indo was arrested in Sukabumi after the Pachinko group was first arrested. Johny Indo was then sentenced to 14 years in prison and thrown into the Nusakambangan prison. However, after only three years of serving his sentence, he and a gang of 34 people tried to escape from Nusakambangan, but he was caught after surviving 12 days.

After being free, he had played in a number of films, one of which was the story of himself in the film Johny Indo in 1987. In his old age, he still travels around preaching Islam and has the alias Umar Billah.

He died on January 26, 2020, after experiencing shortness of breath.

== Filmography ==
- Johny Indo (1987)
- Badai Jalanan (1989)
- Langkah-Langkah Pasti (1989)
- Titisan Si Pitung (1989)
- Laura Si Tarzan (1989)
- Misteri Cinta (1989)
- Susuk (1989)
- Perangkap di Malam Gelap (1990)
- Tembok Derita (1990)
- Tongkat Sakti Puspanaga (1990)
- Diskotik D.J. (1990)
- Ajian Ratu Laut Kidul (1991)
- Misteri Ronggeng (1991)
- Daerah Jagoan (1991)
