= 1947 Yogyakarta Dakota incident =

1947 shootdown incident in Indonesia

Yogyakarta Dakota incident
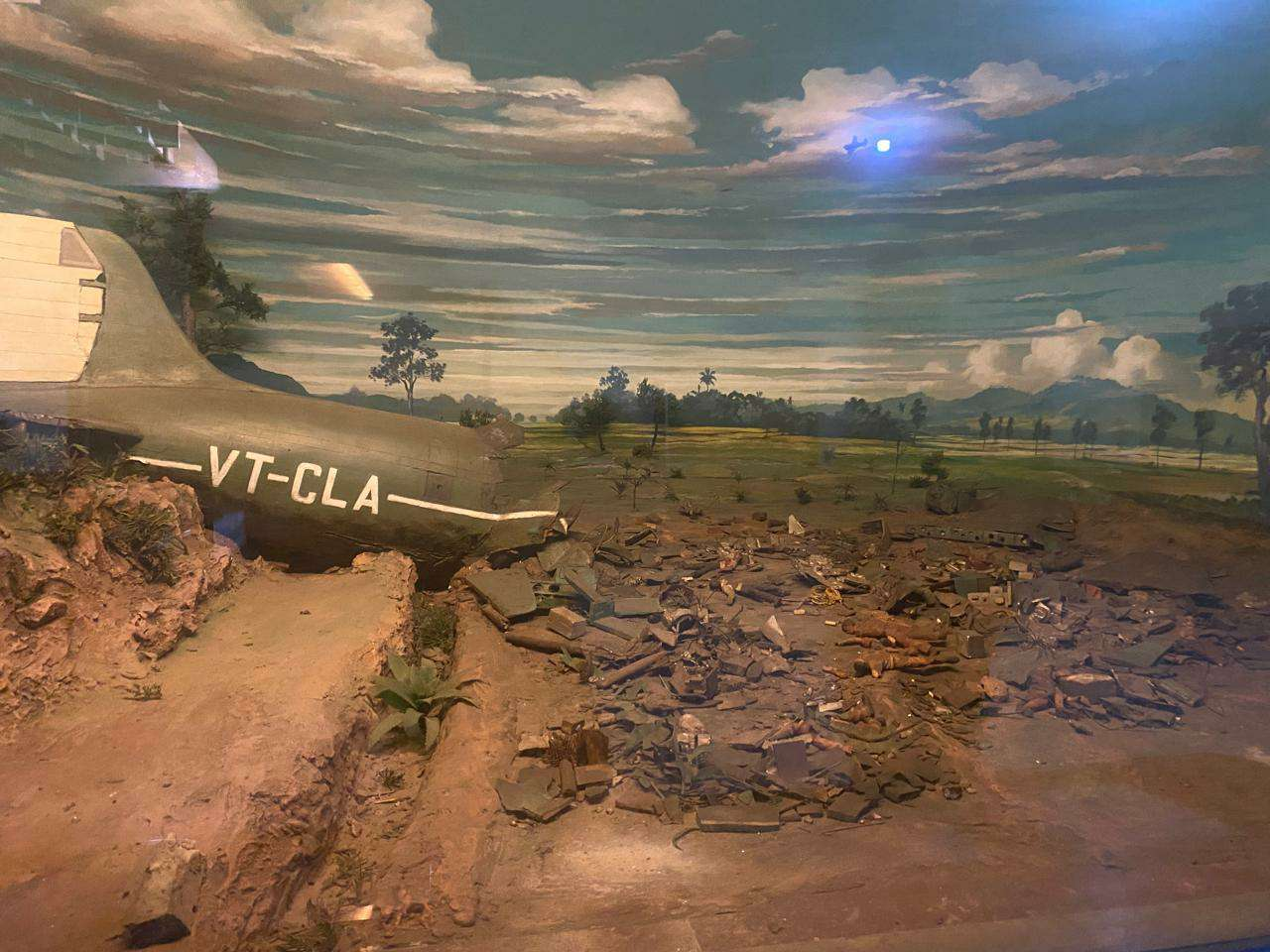
- Diorama depicting the aftermath of the crash

Incident
- Date: 29 July 1947
- Summary: Shot down by Curtiss P-40 Kittyhawks of the Royal Netherlands East Indies Army Air Force
- Site: Ngoto, Bantul, Indonesia; 7°50′22.3″S 110°22′34.6″E

Aircraft
- Aircraft type: Douglas C-47B-20-DK Skytrain
- Registration: VT-CLA
- Flight origin: Singapore
- Destination: Maguwo Airfield, Yogyakarta, Indonesia
- Occupants: 9
- Passengers: 6
- Crew: 3
- Fatalities: 8
- Survivors: 1

The 1947 Yogyakarta Dakota incident occurred when a Douglas C-47 Skytrain was carrying medical supplies to the de facto republican government of Indonesia at Yogyakarta which crashed on 29 July 1947.

During the Indonesian National Revolution (1945–1949), several Indonesian nationalists, including Commodores Agustinus Adisucipto and Abdul Rahman Saleh, were tasked to deliver medical supplies from Malaya. Near the completion of the mission, as their aircraft – chartered from Biju Patnaik's Kalinga Airlines of India and flown by an Australian pilot – approached the airfield at Maguwo, Yogyakarta, two Dutch Curtiss P-40 Kittyhawks flew in and shot the aircraft down over Ngoto, Bantul. Only one person survived the crash.

Although the Dutch initially denied complicity, investigation showed that the Kittyhawks had caused the crash; the Dutch later made restitution to India. On 1 March 1948 a monument to remember the event was built in Ngoto. Since 1979, the Indonesian Air Force has celebrated a Service Day (Hari Bakti) in commemoration of the crash and in remembrance of the deaths.

== Background ==
In gap between the time of Japanese surrender on 15 August 1945 and the arrival of Allied forces in central and western parts of Indonesia, there was a political vacuum which was used by Indonesian nationalist. On 17 August 1945, Sukarno and Hatta proclaimed the nation's independence. The republican nationalists needed a force to fight for their independence.

The first military force, known as the People's Security People's Safety Body (Badan Keamanan Rakjat, or BKR), was formed on 23 August 1945 but tasked with police work. On 5 October of that year the de facto Indonesian government formed a national military, including provisions for an air force. The first pilot in this new air force was Commodore Agustinus Adisucipto, who had flown the first Indonesian aircraft, a Yokosuka K5Y (known locally as a Cureng) left by the Japanese empire. Another commodore, Abdul Rahman Saleh, established the Air Force Technical School in Malang, East Java. Both officers were involved in the crash of the Dakota C-47. Allied Dutch and British forces had already landed on the main island of Java by that time, but the latter were mainly concerned with the repatriation of former prisoners of war. Many eastern parts of former Dutch East Indies were occupied by Allied forces which liberated most of the archipelago during the Allied offensives of 1943–45.

Tensions grew as Indonesians believed that Allied forces had agendas to stamp out their independence and to restore the Netherlands' control in their former colony. Meanwhile, the Dutch sought reoccupy their former colony and punish those who had collaborated with the Japanese during the occupation. Major and minor hostilities broke out between pro-Indonesian forces, pro-Dutch/Allied forces, and Japanese forces.

== Flight ==
Surviving tail section of the aircraft after the crash

Under orders from Sukarno, Adisucipto and Saleh chartered a Douglas C-47B-20-DK from Bijoyanda Patnaik, an Indian national and owner of Kalinga Airlines, to transport medical supplies donated by the Red Cross of Malaya to the Red Cross of Indonesia. The flight was approved by both British and Dutch forces, who guaranteed a safe flight. The night before the flight's departure, Malayan radio broadcast that a flight with the registration number VT-CLA would be carrying medical supplies to Yogyakarta. The flight departed Singapore, piloted by Alexander Noel Constantine, ex-R.A.F. at 1:00 a.m. West Indonesian Time (UTC+7) for Maguwo, the airfield at Yogyakarta. Due to rising tension between the Netherlands and Indonesia, hostilities erupt sporadically. After Japanese surrender in Indonesia, Indonesian military took over many remaining Japanese aircraft, equipment, airfields. Dutch launched Operation Pelikaan (as a part of Operation Product) on 21 July 1947 which destroyed many of the aircraft they had accumulated. In retaliation, the Indonesian air force (with two "Willow" biplanes and a "Sonia" dive bomber) bombed Dutch strongholds in Semarang, Salatiga and Ambarawa on early hours of 29 July which did little damage and no casualty. About two hours later two Dutch P-40 Kittyhawks strafed Yogyakarta.

After three hours of flight, the Dakota C-47 arrived near Maguwo. After the landing gear descended, two Dutch P-40 Kittyhawks appeared and shot at the aircraft. After bullets destroyed the left engine, the aircraft went into a dive, first crashing into a tree then into paddy fields in Ngoto, Bantul. Only its tail remained in one piece.

== Aftermath ==
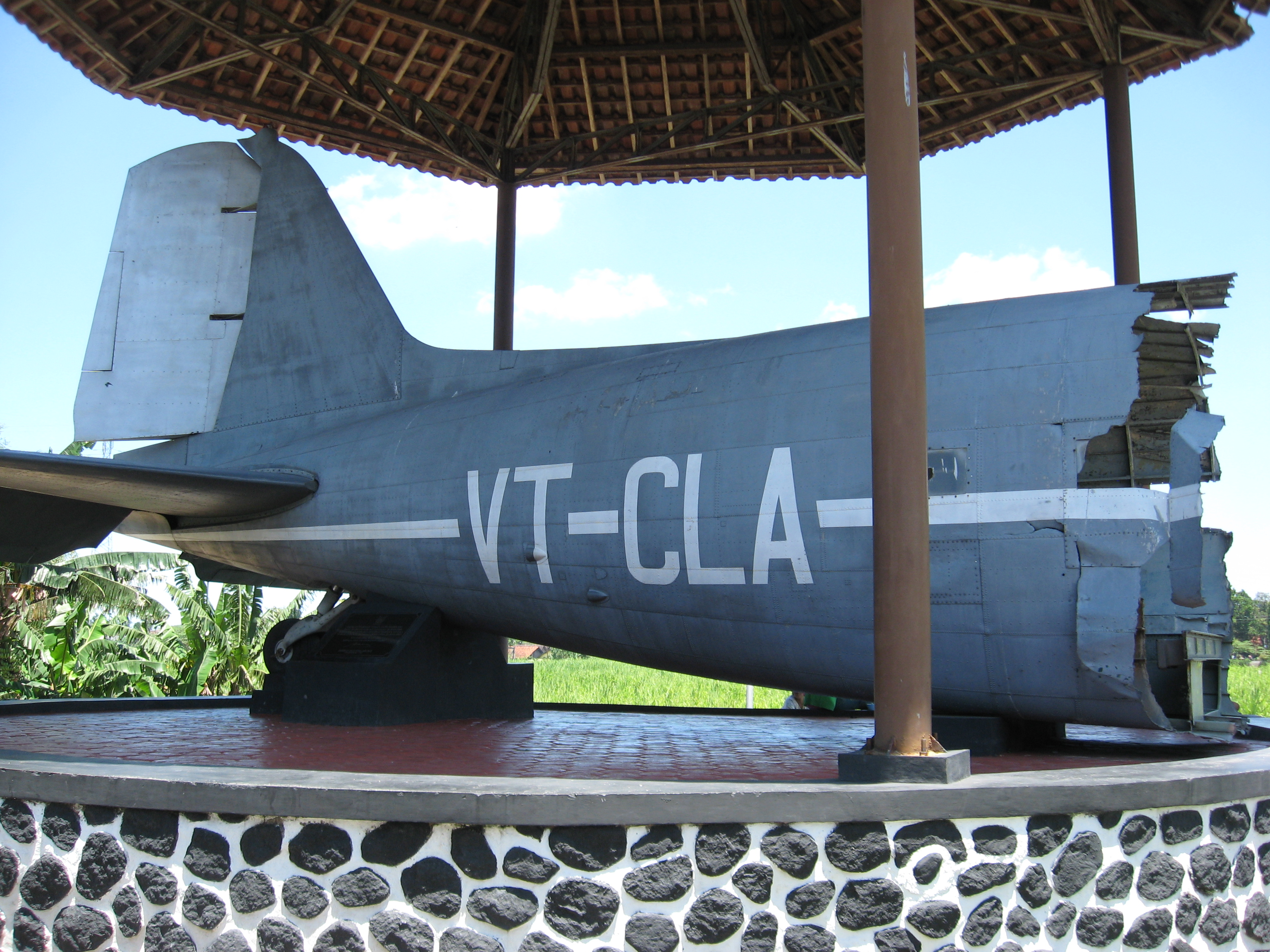
A replica of the aircraft's tail

Of the nine passengers and crew, seven died on impact. Two others, the pilot's wife Beryl and Abdulgani Handonotjokro, rushed to Bethesda Hospital in the city. Beryl Constantine succumbed to her wounds at the hospital, while Handonotjokro survived. After a memorial service at Tugu Hotel, which had been used as a temporary barracks for the air force, Adisucipto and Saleh were buried at Kuncen Cemetery in Yogyakarta, while Adi Soemarmo Wirjokusumo was buried in Kusumanegara Heroes' Cemetery.

The Dutch initially rejected that the Kittyhawks were involved in the crash, stating that the plane seemed to have crashed into something. However, witnesses on the ground reported that the Kittyhawks had come from the viewer's right of the Dakota and shot at it. An inspection of Wirjokusumo's body, when it was recovered, confirmed that he had been shot. The Dutch later denied knowledge of the flight and said that it not had Red Cross markings. After India protested the incident, the Dutch government sent a Dakota C-47A along with financial restitution to India.

== Legacy ==
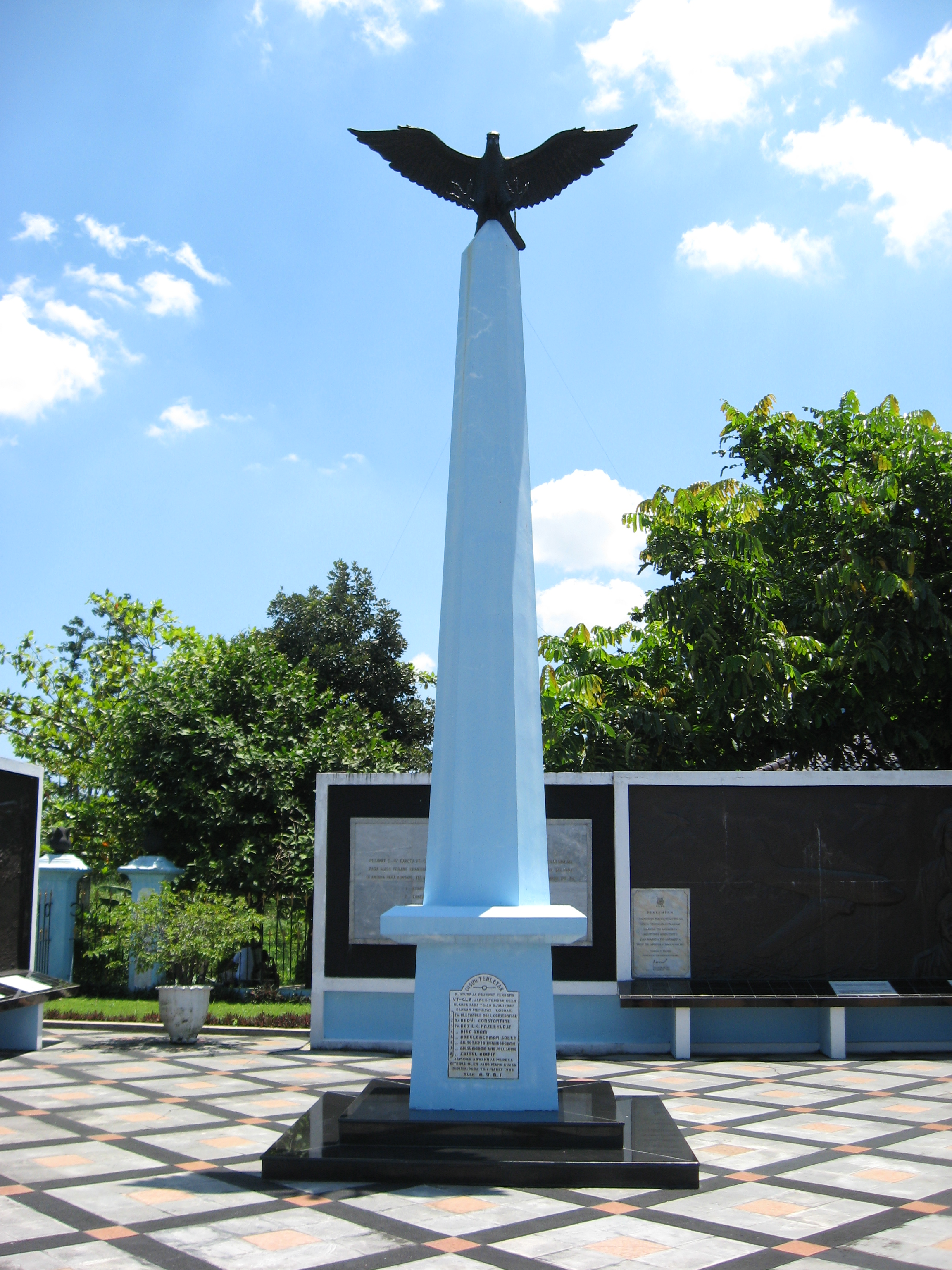
Memorial to the crash, in Ngoto

On 1 March 1948, a monument to commemorate the crash was built in Ngoto. Both Adisucipto and Saleh were declared National Heroes of Indonesia in 1974. In 2000, Adisucipto and Saleh were moved from their initial burial spots to the monument, where they are buried together with their wives.

Since 1979, the Indonesian Air Force has celebrated a Service Day (Hari Bakti) in commemoration of the crash and in remembrance of the deaths, based on Decision of the Indonesian Air Force Commander Number 133/VII/1976.

The Air Force base in Malang is named after Abdul Rachman Saleh, while the one in Yogyakarta is named after Adisutjipto.

== Victims ==
Seven people died when the aircraft was shot down and one died in the hospital, they were:

- Alexander Noel Constantine (pilot), an Australian national
- Roy L. C. Hazelhurst (co-pilot), a British national
- Bhida Ram (flight engineer), an Indian national
- Beryl Constantine, an Australian national
- Air Commodore Abdul Rahman Saleh
- Air Commodore Agustinus Adisucipto
- First Lieutenant Adisumarmo Wiryokusumo
- Zainal Arifin
