= Adisutjipto Airport =

Airport in Yogyakarta, Indonesia

Adisutjipto Airport Bandar Udara Adisutjipto ꦥꦥꦤ꧀ꦄꦤ꧀ꦒ꧀ꦒꦼꦒꦤꦄꦢꦶꦱꦸꦠ꧀ꦗꦶꦥ꧀ꦠꦺꦴ _{Papan Anggêgana Adisutjipto}

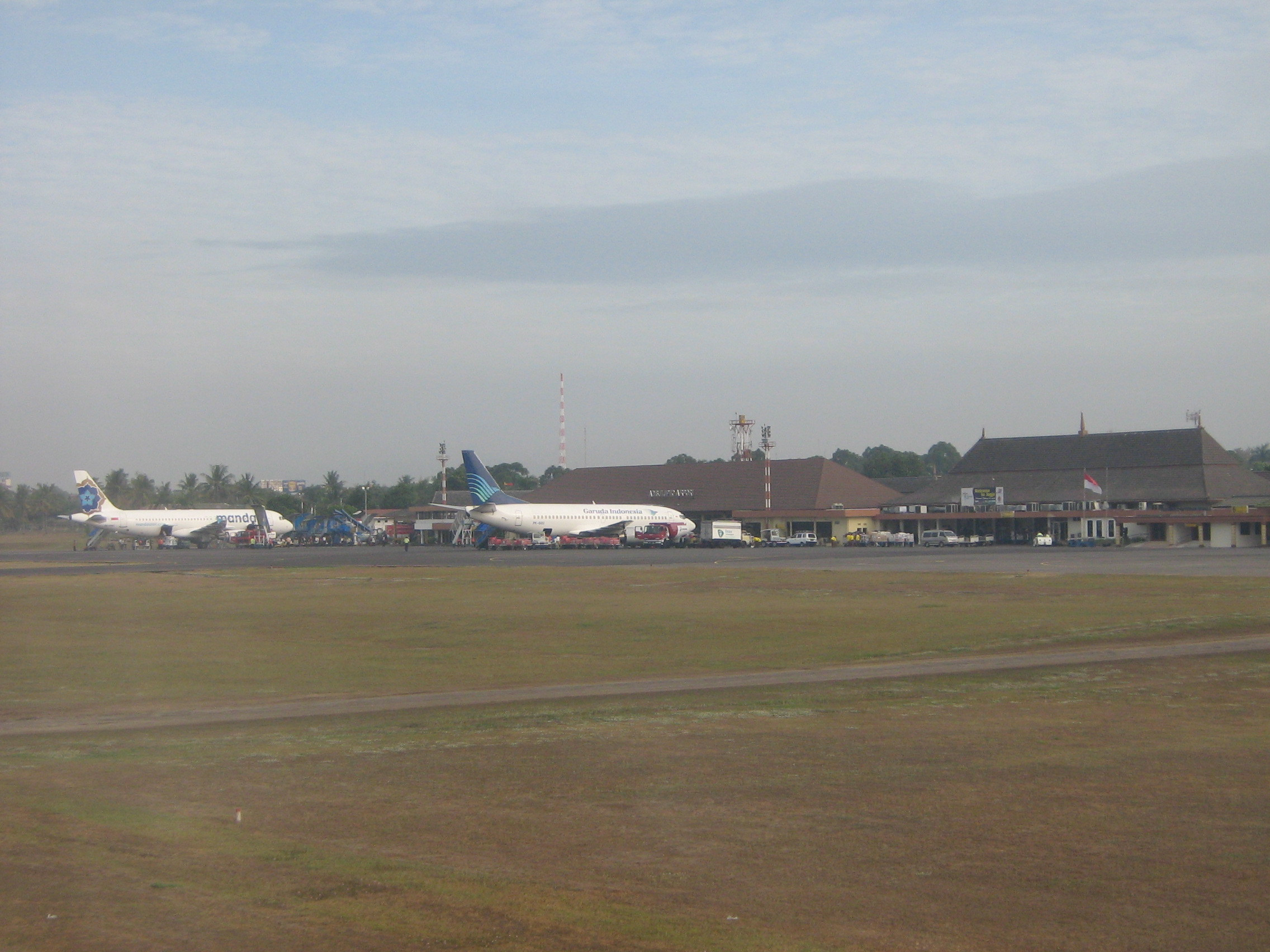
- IATA: JOG; ICAO: WAHH

Summary
- Airport type: Public / Military
- Owner: Indonesian Air Force
- Operator: InJourney Airports
- Serves: Special Region of Yogyakarta
- Location: Maguwoharjo, Depok District, Sleman Regency, Yogyakarta, Indonesia
- Time zone: WIB (UTC+07:00)
- Elevation AMSL: 379 ft (116 m)
- Coordinates: 07°47′17″S 110°25′54″E
- Website: www.adisutjipto-airport.co.id

Maps
- Java region in Indonesia

- Location of airport in Special Region of Yogyakarta, Indonesia JOG/WAHH (Indonesia) JOG/WAHH (Southeast Asia) JOG/WAHH (Asia)

Runways
Direction	Length		Surface
Direction	m	ft	Surface
09/27	2,200	7,218	Asphalt

Statistics (2024)
- Passengers: 126,812 (▼19.76%)
- Cargo (tonnes): 19.76 (▼81.8%)
- Aircraft movements: 2,536 (▼59.2%)
- Source: DGCA

Adisutjipto Airport (IATA: JOG, ICAO: WAHH) is a domestic airport serving Yogyakarta, the capital city of the Special Region of Yogyakarta, and its surrounding areas on the island of Java, Indonesia. The airport is named after Agustinus Adisutcipto, an Indonesian Air Force officer and a recognized National Hero of Indonesia. Although it primarily serves the city, the airport is located in Maguwoharjo, Sleman Regency, on the northeastern outskirts of Yogyakarta, near the Prambanan temple complex and close to the border with Klaten Regency in Central Java. The airport lies approximately 6 kilometres (3.7 mi) from the city centre. Prior to the opening of Yogyakarta International Airport in Kulon Progo Regency in 2019, Adisutjipto Airport was the main gateway to Yogyakarta, handling domestic flights to major cities such as Jakarta, Denpasar, and Surabaya, as well as international services to Singapore and Malaysia. At its peak, it was the fourth busiest airport in the Java–Bali region, after Soekarno–Hatta International Airport in Jakarta, Juanda International Airport in Surabaya, and Ngurah Rai International Airport in Bali. Following the opening of the new airport, Adisutjipto now functions as a secondary airport, serving limited short-haul domestic routes, primarily to Jakarta.

While the commercial operations of the airport are managed by InJourney Airports, the land itself is owned by the Indonesian Air Force, with the passenger terminal functioning as a civil enclave. The airport shares its facilities with Adisutjipto Air Force Base, a Type A installation of the Indonesian Air Force. The base is home to the Indonesian Air Force Academy and also serves as the headquarters of the Flying Training Wing, which oversees several training squadrons stationed there. These include the 101st Training Squadron, which operates the Grob G 120 TP-A; the 102nd Training Squadron, which operates the KAI KT-1 Woongbi; and the 104th Training Squadron. The Dirgantara Mandala Museum, the official museum of the Indonesian Air Force, is also located within the airbase complex.

== History ==
=== World War II ===
Adisutjipto Airport traces its origins to a landing ground at Maguwo, constructed by the Dutch East Indies colonial government in 1940 as a military airbase for the Royal Netherlands East Indies Army Air Force (ML-KNIL). With the outbreak of World War II and the onset of the Pacific War, Maguwo Airfield became the home base of Verkenningsafdeling 2 (2nd reconnaissance Squadron) of the ML-KNIL. The unit operated 11 Curtiss-Wright CW-22 aircraft and 2 Fokker C.X aircraft, and was placed under the control of ML-KNIL headquarters to carry out battlefield aerial reconnaissance missions.

Japanese forces launched their invasion of the Dutch East Indies in January 1942 and had landed on Java by the end of the following month. Amid the Japanese advance, Maguwo Airfield became the last remaining operational airfield in Java available to Allied forces. At the time, a small number of United States Army Air Forces (USAAF) aircraft from the Fifth Air Force were stationed at Maguwo Airfield. By early March, as Japanese forces advanced to within 20 miles of the airfield, the aircraft were withdrawn to Broome, Australia. The remaining airmen subsequently evacuated, effectively abandoning the facility. Meanwhile, Dutch soldiers sabotaged the runway to prevent it from being captured in operational condition, before proceeding to destroy remaining ammunition. The Japanese soon captured the airfield intact and promptly restored it for their own use, employing captured Allied prisoners of war to repair bomb craters and damaged buildings.

During the Japanese occupation, the airfield was operated by the Imperial Japanese Navy Air Service. Throughout the war, the Japanese constructed various fortifications around the site, including underground bunkers, some of which remain to this day. By 1945, the airfield had become the base of the Navy's 31st Air Group, which operated around eighty Yokosuka K5Y biplanes used to train pilots for kamikaze missions against Allied forces.

=== Indonesian National Revolution ===
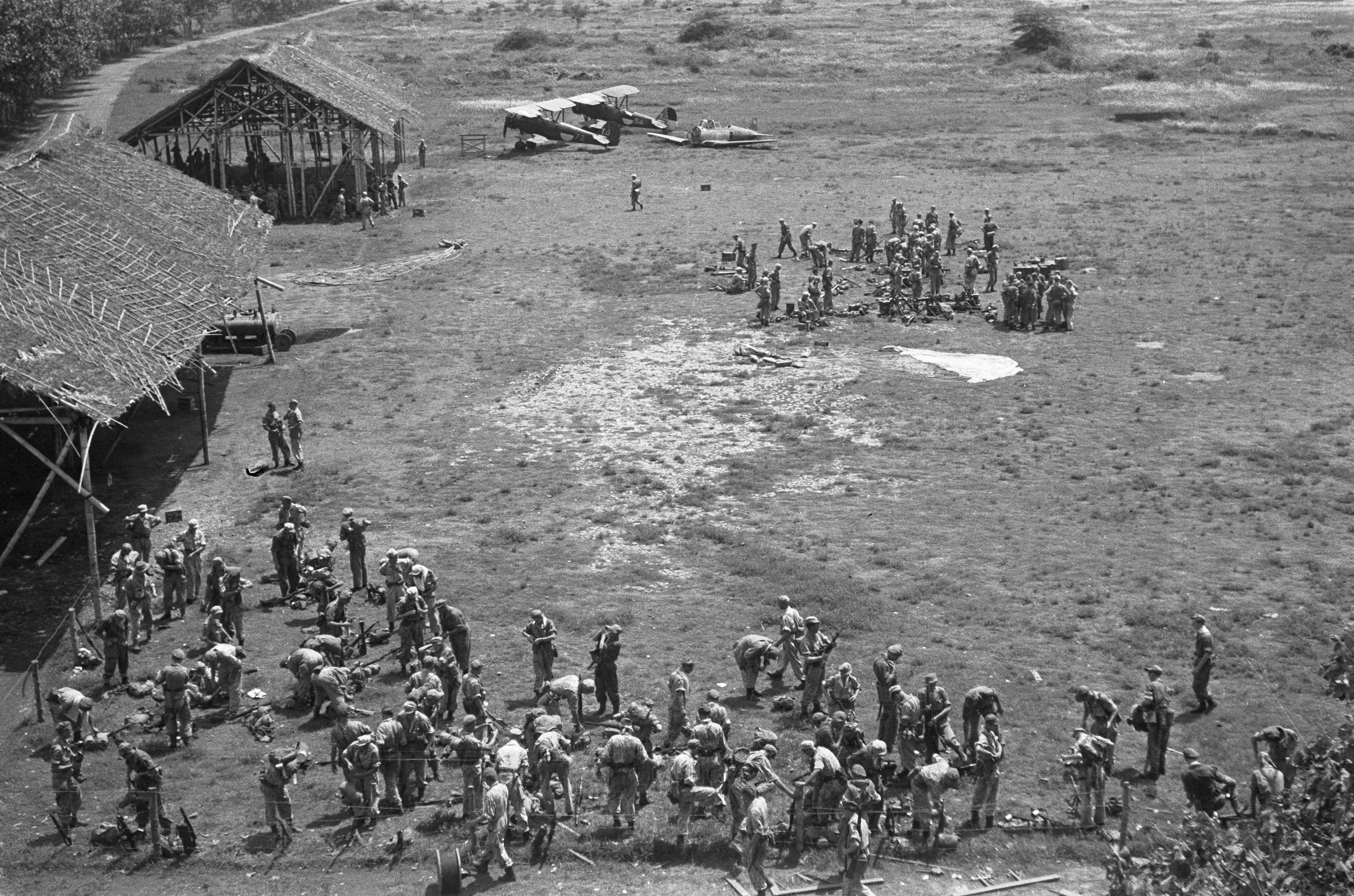
Dutch troops at Maguwo airfield with captured Indonesian Air Force biplanes in the background, 19 December 1948

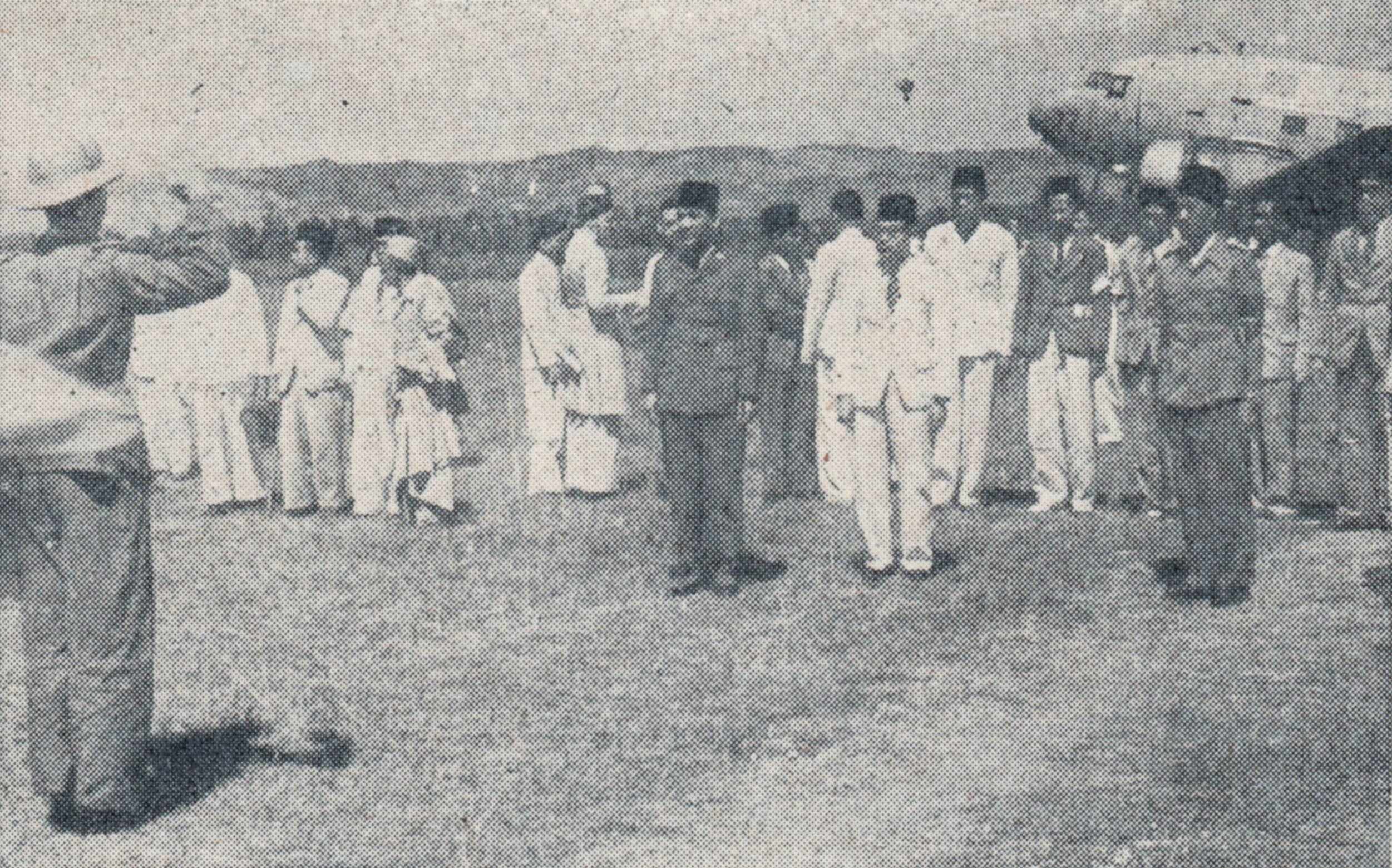
President Sukarno at Maguwo Airfield following his return from exile, 16 June 1949

Following the surrender of Japan in August 1945, Japanese troops at the airfield laid down their arms to the British Army. Despite this, they were permitted to continue guarding Maguwo Airfield under the supervision of a British non-commissioned officer. On 2 October 1945, Indonesian militias launched an attack on the airfield, prompting the Japanese to surrender and hand over their equipment, largely intact, to the local forces. At that time, Maguwo Airfield possessed around 70 ex-Japanese aircraft. In the second week of October 1945, following the capture of the airbase, initial efforts focused on regrouping Indonesian aviation personnel. Approximately 30 individuals were assembled, forming the first team responsible for carrying out aircraft repairs. On 27 October 1945, the first repaired aircraft took to the air—a Yokosuka K5Y, nicknamed “Cureng”, flown by Agustinus Adisutjipto, a former ML-KNIL pilot. On 15 November 1945, a flight school was established at the airfield, with Agustinus Adisutjipto serving as its principal. This institution later became the precursor to the present-day Indonesian Air Force Academy.

Throughout the Indonesian National Revolution, Maguwo Airfield served as a major base of the Indonesian Air Force. The Dutch, recognizing the strategic importance of the airfield, repeatedly targeted it throughout the conflict. When the Dutch launched Operation Product in July 1947, they destroyed most of the former Japanese aircraft at Maguwo Airfield, leaving only a few intact and severely weakening the Indonesian Air Force. On 29 July 1947, two Dutch Curtiss P-40 Kittyhawks shot down a Douglas C-47 Skytrain that was approaching Maguwo Airfield while carrying medical supplies from Malaya. Among those on board were several Indonesian figures, including Agustinus Adisutjipto and the prominent aviator Abdul Rahman Saleh; only one person survived.

The Dutch launched a second major offensive against the Republic in December 1948, codenamed Operation Kraai, with the capture of Yogyakarta as its primary objective. Securing Maguwo Airfield was a key initial step in the operation. In the early hours of 19 December 1948, Dutch aircraft took off from Bandung and approached Yogyakarta via the Indian Ocean. At around 05:30, the ML-KNIL bombed Maguwo Airfield and nearby communications facilities. Shortly afterward, Dutch paratroopers from the Korps Speciale Troepen landed at the airfield, which was defended by just 47 lightly armed Indonesian Air Force cadets with no anti-aircraft weapons. The ensuing engagement lasted about 25 minutes and ended with the Dutch capturing the airfield. Around 128 Indonesian defenders were killed, while the Dutch reportedly suffered no casualties. By 06:45, after securing the perimeter, Dutch forces landed additional troops in two successive waves and established Maguwo as an airhead for reinforcements from their main base in Semarang. With the exception of a brief period on 1 March 1949, when Republican militias temporarily recaptured the airfield during the General Offensive of 1 March 1949, the Dutch retained control of the airfield until the signing of the Roem–Van Roijen Agreement. Under the terms of the agreement, they withdrew from Yogyakarta, after which the airfield was handed over to Indonesian authorities.

=== Independence era ===
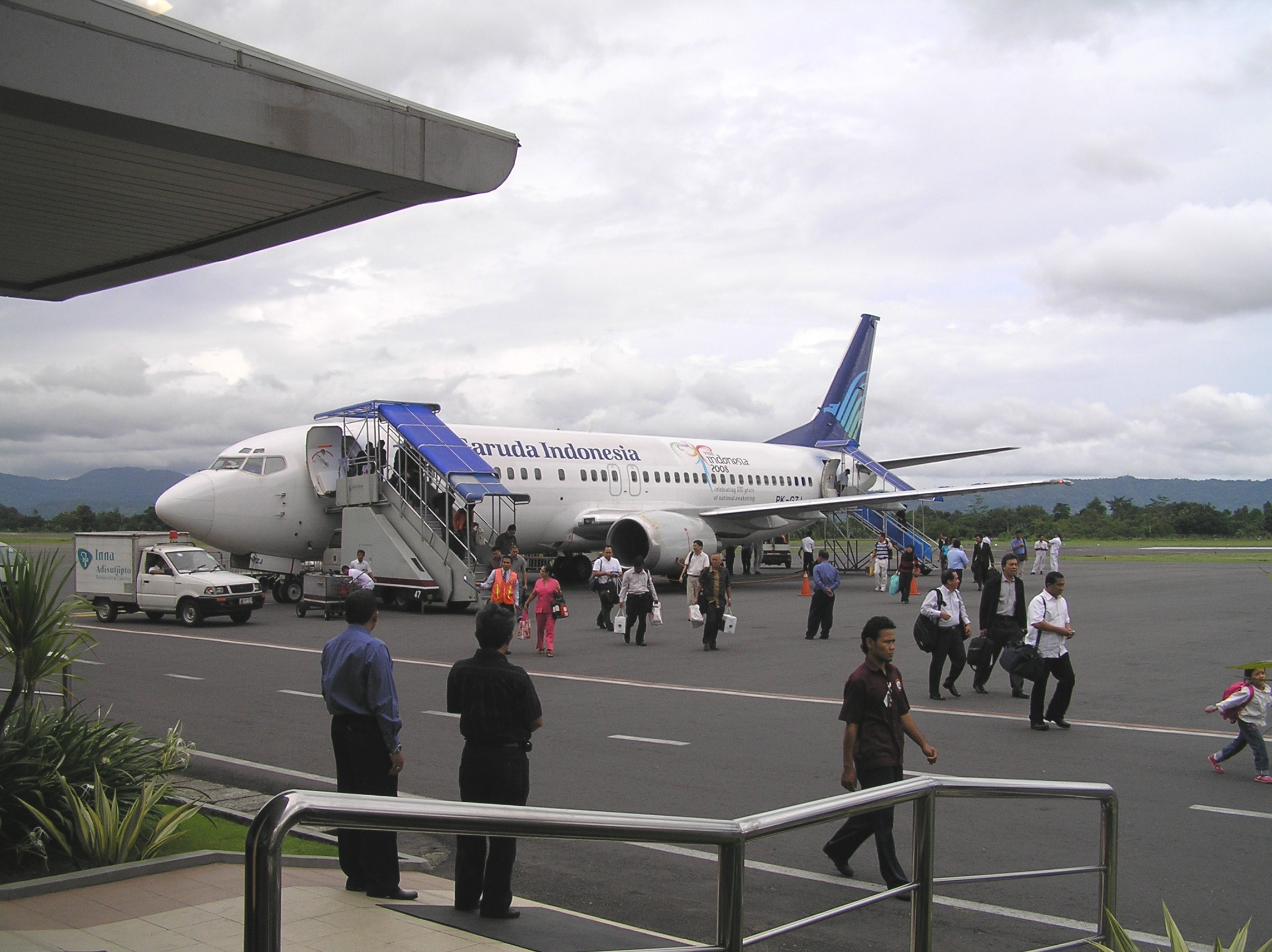
A Garuda Indonesia Boeing 737-400 at Adisutjipto Airport, 2008

Following the end of the war, the airfield remained under the control of the Indonesian Air Force. On 17 August 1952, Maguwo Airfield was renamed to its present name in honor of Agustinus Adisutjipto, who played a key role in the establishment of the Indonesian Air Force and made significant contributions during the Indonesian National Revolution.

Since 1959, Adisutjipto Airport has been used by the Indonesian Air Force Academy (AAU). In 1964, following a decision by the Directorate General of Civil Aviation and with the approval of the Indonesian Air Force, the airport was designated as a joint civil–military facility. In 1972, the first expansion of the civil passenger terminal was undertaken, followed by a further expansion in 1977 to accommodate the growing volume of air traffic. On 1 April 1992, management of the airport was transferred to Angkasa Pura I, which was later rebranded as InJourney Airports.

Adisutjipto Airport was officially designated as an international airport on 21 February 2004, marked by its inaugural international service to Singapore, operated by Indonesia’s flag carrier Garuda Indonesia. This milestone represented the culmination of more than three decades of efforts by the city to obtain international airport status. In 2020, all international flight operations were transferred to Yogyakarta International Airport as part of the broader aviation restructuring in the region. Subsequently, in April 2024, the Ministry of Transportation officially revoked Adisutjipto Airport’s international status, leaving it to serve primarily domestic and limited aviation functions thereafter.

The airport was heavily damaged by the 2006 Yogyakarta earthquake and had to be closed for two days. Some parts of the runway were cracked, and the departure lounge collapsed. Most flights were canceled or rerouted to Adisoemarmo International Airport, Surakarta. After the airport returned to service on 30 May 2006, all passengers used the international lounge until the new domestic departure lounge was ready. During this period, passenger comfort was affected as the international lounge was designed only for about 100 passengers at a time. The airport was closed for several days due to the 2010 Mount Merapi eruption, flights were diverted to Adisoemarmo International Airport in Surakarta, Jenderal Ahmad Yani International Airport in Semarang, or transferred to another mode of transportation in Yogyakarta.

== Facilities and development ==
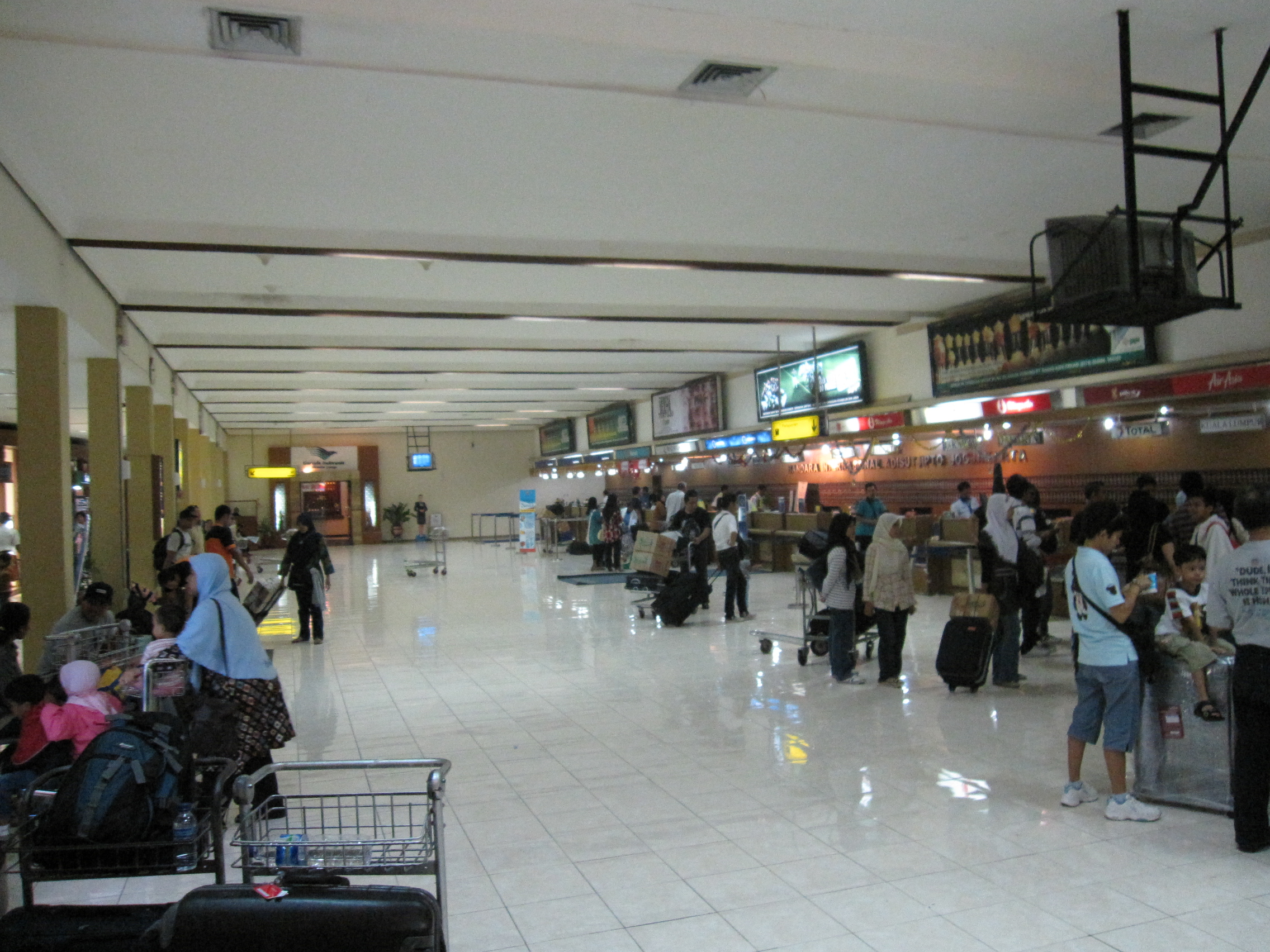
Terminal A check-in hall, 2009

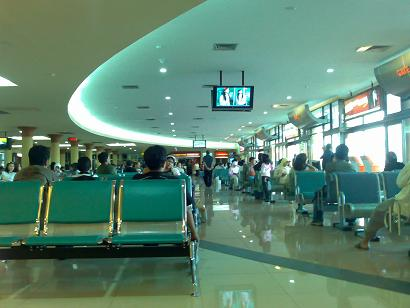
Terminal A departure lounge, 2007

Adisutjipto Airport previously had two terminals, Terminal A and Terminal B. Terminal A, which was the original terminal, covered an area of 9,899 m² and had a capacity of up to 800,000 passengers per year. In 2010, Terminal A was planned to be expanded to 18,000 m² to accommodate the growing number of passengers, with a budget of up to 162 billion rupiah. However, the project was ultimately cancelled for unspecified reasons.

On 17 August 2015, the new Terminal B was completed and officially inaugurated. The terminal building has an area of 7,000 m² and a capacity of up to 600,000 passengers per year. Constructed over 1.5 years with a budget of 20 billion rupiah, Terminal B was equipped with supporting facilities similar to those of the existing terminal, including vehicle parking areas, taxi counters, and other passenger services. The distance between Terminal A and Terminal B is about 100 m, which was connected using a travelator. At that time, Terminal A was used for domestic flights, while Terminal B handled international operations. However, following the transfer of most commercial flights to Yogyakarta International Airport in 2020, Terminal A was temporarily closed and repurposed as a marketing area for MSME products and Yogyakarta’s creative industries. It was later reactivated on 1 February 2022, while Terminal B was subsequently closed.

The airport has a single runway measuring 2,200 m × 45 m, which is capable of accommodating narrow-body aircraft such as the Boeing 737 and Airbus A320. In 2010, a proposal was made to extend the runway by 300 m to a total length of 2,500 m, with completion originally planned for 2014. A budget of approximately Rp 930 billion had been allocated for the project. However, the plan was ultimately cancelled due to topographical constraints, as Bokoharjo Hill lies to the east of the runway, while the Janti Flyover is located to the west, limiting the feasibility of further runway extension. The airport has two aprons with a total of 11 aircraft parking stands. The first apron, located at Terminal A, measures 315 m × 86 m and accommodates eight parking stands. The second apron, situated at Terminal B, measures 125 m × 76 m and provides three parking stands.

=== New airport ===
Limited land availability around the airport for expansion, combined with severe overcapacity—where the airport was designed for approximately 1.8 million passengers annually but handled around 7.8 million passengers in 2018—placed significant strain on its operations. In addition, as a civil enclave within a military airbase, the airport must share airspace with the Indonesian Air Force, which operates around 90 military flights per day compared to 176 civil flights. This high level of mixed traffic further constrains air operations and reduces efficiency. These factors ultimately led the government to decide to construct a new airport.

Ultimately, it was decided that the new airport would be built in Temon, Kulon Progo Regency, approximately 43 km (26.7 miles) from Adisutjipto Airport. Construction began in 2017, with partial operations starting on 29 April 2019 and full operations commencing on 29 March 2020. The new airport has a total annual capacity of 9 million passengers, significantly higher than that of Adisutjipto Airport.

As of 29 March 2020, Adisutjipto Airport has been operating on a limited basis, handling only restricted commercial flights alongside military and private aviation services.

== Airlines and destinations ==
=== Passenger ===
Airlines	Destinations
Citilink	Jakarta–Halim Perdanakusuma
FlyJaya	Jakarta–Halim Perdanakusuma
Susi Air	Bandung–Husein Sastranegara, Karimunjawa

== Statistics ==
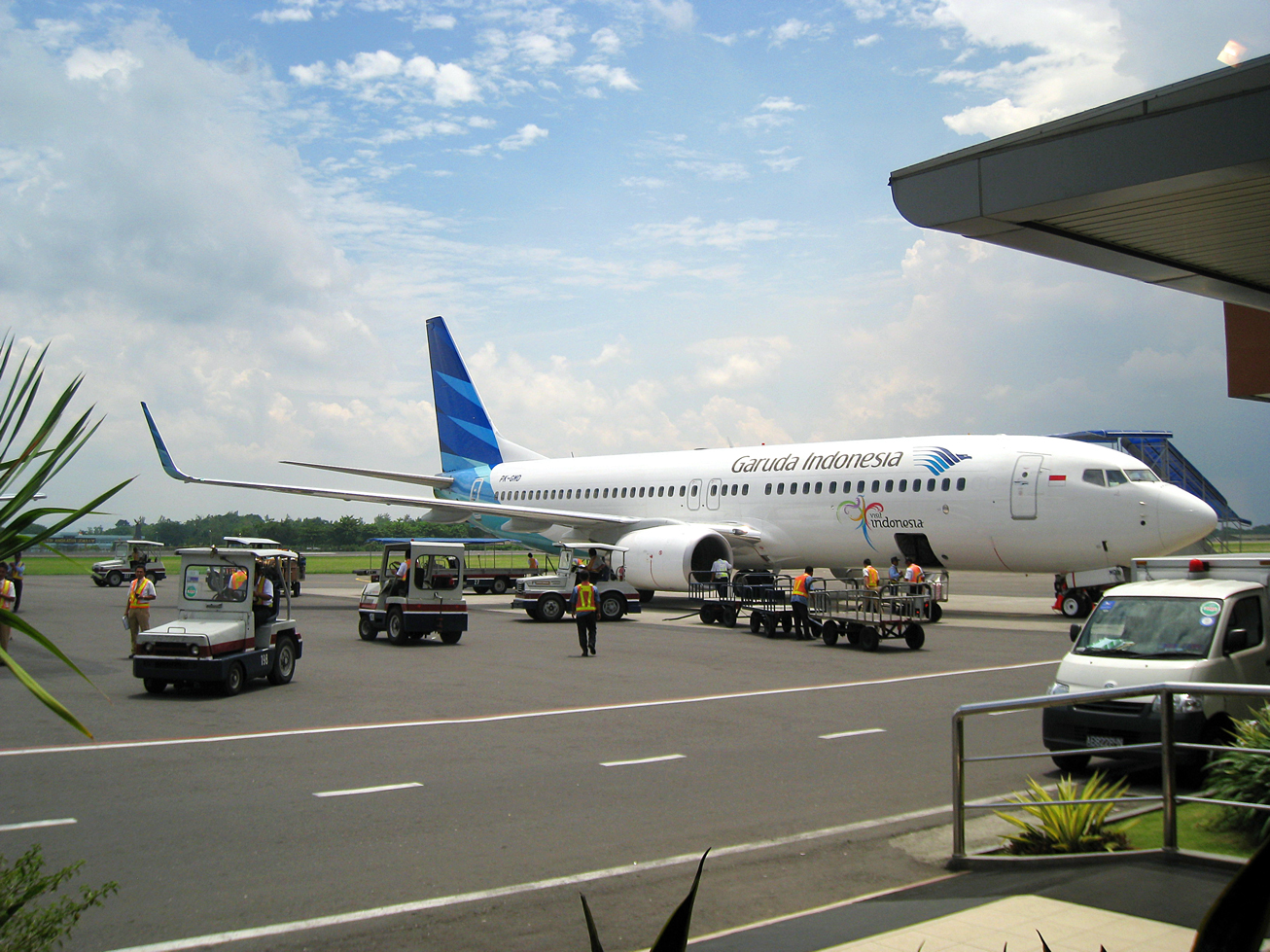
A Garuda Indonesia Boeing 737 NG with its current livery at Adisutjipto Airport, Yogyakarta, Indonesia (2010)

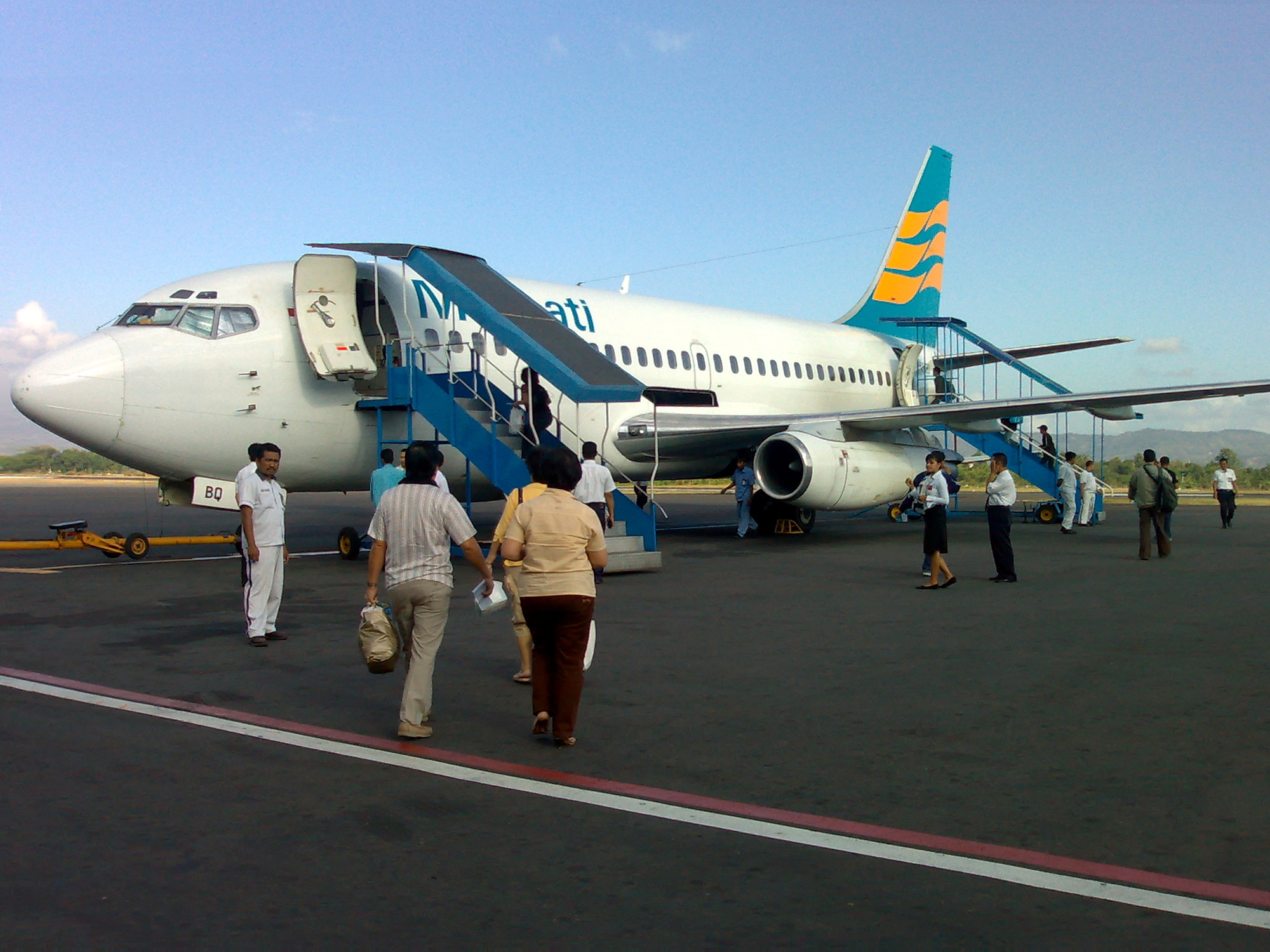
A Merpati Nusantara Airlines Boeing 737-200 at Adisutjipto Airport, 2007

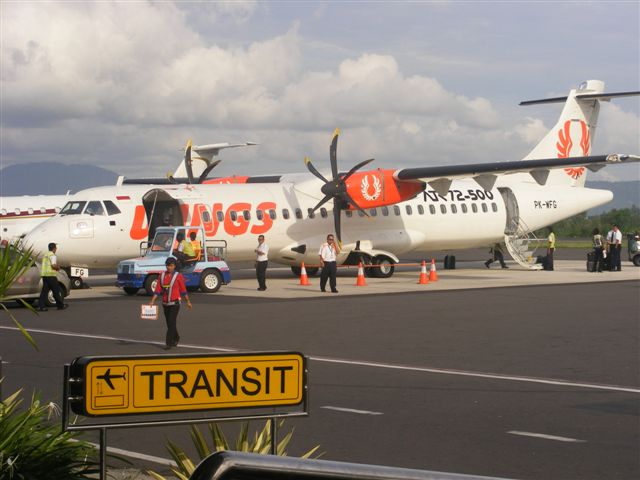
A Wings Air ATR 72-500 at Adisutjipto Airport, 2010

Annual passenger numbers and aircraft statistics
Year	Passengers handled	Passenger % change	Cargo (tonnes)	Cargo % change	Aircraft movements	Aircraft % change
2001	806,744	Steady	2,066.65	Steady	11,505	Steady
2002	917,714	▲13.8	2,602.28	▲25.9	12,010	▲4.4
2003	1,481,022	▲61.4	3,712.44	▲42.7	17,052	▲42.0
2004	2,442,915	▲64.9	8,307.45	▲123.8	27,102	▲58.9
2005	2,558,262	▲4.7	11,267.96	▲35.6	25,961	▼4.2
2006	2,564,144	▲0.2	9,667.94	▼14.2	23,050	▼11.2
2007	2,598,549	▲1.3	10,528.33	▲8.9	22,559	▼2.1
2008	2,793,769	▲7.5	11,627.95	▲10.4	24,150	▲7.1
2009	3,368,228	▲20.6	11,209.41	▼3.6	37,894	▲56.9
2010	3,690,350	▲9.6	12,307.35	▲9.8	46,457	▲22.6
2011	4,292,156	▲16.3	12,850.48	▲4.4	51,516	▲10.9
2012	4,998,028	▲16.4	13,717.77	▲6.7	58,629	▲13.8
2013	5,775,947	▲15.6	14,819.93	▲8.0	64,719	▲10.4
2014	6,236,578	▲8.0	15,922.94	▲7.4	72,868	▲12.6
2015	6,380,336	▲2.3	16,104.12	▲1.1	83,773	▲15.0
2016	7,208,557	▲13.0	17,124.14	▲6.3	95,885	▲14.5
2017	8,634,369	▲19.8	18,145.17	▲6.0	103,944	▲8.4
2018	9,617,589	▲11.4	22,484.79	▲23.9	61,863	▼40.5
2019	6,850,716	▼28.8	20,502.16	▼8.8	54,925	▼11.2
2020	1,523,183	▼77.8	3,988.45	▼80.5	14,958	▼72.8
2021	140,011	▼90.8	6,783,20	▲70.1	3,125	▼79.1
2022	123,948	▼11.5	25,46	▼99.6	2,841	▼9.1
2023	158,868	▲28.2	108.41	▲325.8	6,214	▲118.7
2024	126,812	▼20.2	19.76	▼81.8	2,536	▼59.2
^{Source: DGCA, Angkasa Pura I}

== Ground transportation ==
=== Bus ===
Shuttle buses serve several destinations from Adisucipto Airport; it is served by the bus operator DAMRI. These fares are valid as of 20 July 2016.

Destination	Fare (IDR)
Adisucipto Airport Bus all operated by DAMRI
Kebumen (Hotel Patra)	60,000
Magelang (Hotel Wisata)	50,000
Purworejo (Pool Damri)	50,000
Wonosari	50,000
Secang	60,000
Temanggung	70,000
Borobudur	75,000
Borobudur	85,000

Trans Jogja, a bus rapid transit (BRT) of Yogyakarta opened several routes passing through the Adisucipto Airport which connects passengers to destinations around Yogyakarta, along with other Trans Jogja routes.

Service	Route	Notes
Trans Jogja City Bus
Trans Jogja Line 1A	Prambanan Bus Terminal – Adisucipto Airport – Tugu Station – Malioboro – Jogja Expo Centre (JEC)	
Trans Jogja Line 1B	Prambanan Bus Terminal – Adisucipto Airport- Jogja Expo Centre (JEC) – General Post Office – Pingit – Gadjah Mada University	
Trans Jogja Line 3A	Adisucipto Airport – Ngabean Terminal	
Trans Jogja Line 3B	Giwangan Bus Terminal – Jokteng Kulon – Pingit – MM Gadjah Mada University – Yogyakarta Northern Ring Road – Adisucipto Airport – Kotagede	
Trans Jogja Line 5B	Adisucipto Airport – Jombor Terminal	
Teman Bus Yogyakarta City Bus
Teman Bus Line K3J	Adisucipto Airport – Pakem Terminal	

=== Car and taxi ===
The airport is located on Yogya to Solo road km. 9, which is a part of Indonesian National Route 17, and connects Adisucipto Airport to Yogyakarta city centre, as well as Solo. There is extensive car and motorcycle parking space available. Car rental and taxis are available.

=== Rail ===
Adisucipto Airport is connected with Maguwo Station, which is connected to the airport via a tunnel. As of 2021, the station is served by KAI Commuter Yogyakarta Line commuter rail, serving the Yogyakarta to Solo Balapan corridor.

== Accidents and incidents ==
- On 13 January 1985, a Vickers Viscount PK-RVT of Mandala Airlines was damaged beyond economic repair after it made a belly landing.
- On 13 January 1995, Garuda Indonesia's Boeing 737-300 PK-GWF overran the runway by about 50 metres due to the runway being wet with rain; there were no casualties.
- On 7 March 2007, Garuda Indonesia Flight 200, a Boeing 737-400 PK-GZC, came in too fast, bounced twice, overran the runway and burst into flames upon landing from Jakarta; 21 passengers and a crew member were killed in this accident. This was the first fatal incident at Adisucipto Airport.
- On 20 December 2011, Sriwijaya Air Flight 230, operated by Boeing 737-300 PK-CKM, overran the runway as it was not on a stabilised landing criteria and came in too fast; there were no casualties.
- On 6 November 2015, Batik Air flight 6380, a Boeing 737-9GP(ER) PK-LBO, overran the runway on landing by 100 metres, which caused the nose gear to collapse; no casualties were reported.
- On 1 February 2017, Garuda Indonesia Flight 258, a Boeing 737-800 registered PK-GNK, overran the runway; all 123 passengers on board survived.
- On 23 October 2020, the landing gear of Citilink Flight 1107, an ATR 72-600, was struck by a kite during the landing at the airport; the aircraft was not damaged.

== See also ==
- Yogyakarta International Airport
- Sleman Regency
