= Agustinus Adisutjipto =

Indonesian military officer

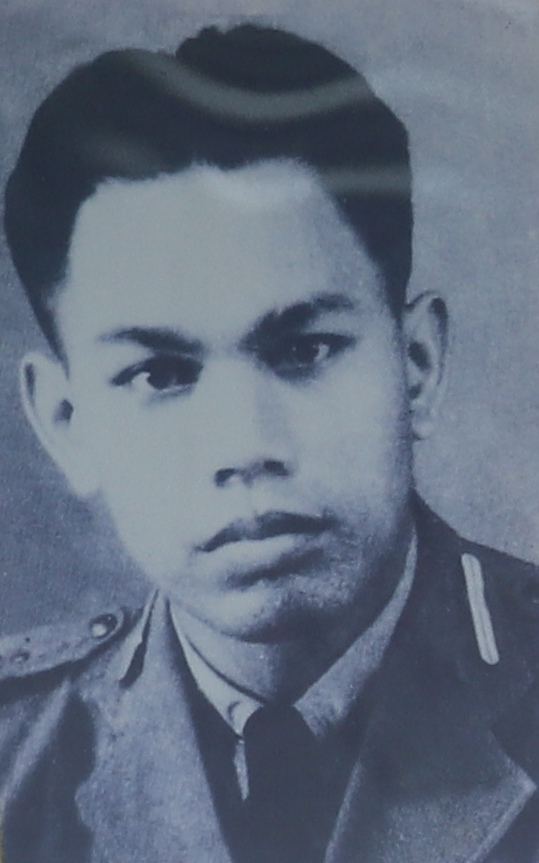
- Born: 4 July 1916; Salatiga, Central Java, Dutch East Indies
- Died: 29 July 1947 (aged 31); Ngoto, Maguwoharjo, Yogyakarta
- Burial place: Ngoto, Maguwoharjo, Yogyakarta
- Military career
- Allegiance: Dutch East Indies (1937–1942); Indonesia (1945–1947)
- Branch: KNIL Air Force; Indonesian Air Force
- Service years: 1939–1942, 1945–1947
- Rank: Air Commodore (at death); Air Vice-Marshal (posthumously)
- Conflicts: World War II; Indonesian National Revolution; Operation Product †
- Awards: National Hero of Indonesia

Agustinus Adisutjipto (Perfected Spelling: Agustinus Adisucipto, 4 July 1916 – 29 July 1947) was born in Salatiga, Central Java, and raised as a Roman Catholic. He was the first pilot of the Indonesian Air Force, whose plane was shot down by the Dutch during the Indonesian National Revolution. He was posthumously declared a National Hero of Indonesia in 1974.

== Early life ==
Adisutjipto was born in Salatiga, Central Java, Dutch East Indies, on 4 July 1916. He was the firstborn of four brothers. His father, Roewidodarmo, was a school superintendent and devout Catholic. Adisutjipto developed an interest in aviation at an early age. However, his father disagreed with his career pursuits in aviation and instead wanted him to become a doctor, which he reluctantly followed. He then attended the school of medicine Geneeskundige Hoge School (GHS) in Batavia.

Unbeknownst to his father, Adisutjipto took an exam to enter the military flight school Militaire Luchtvaart Opleidings School in Kalijati, West Java, and got accepted. Finally his father accepted his career choice. He then graduated from the flight school in two years (a year earlier than his peers) and became one of the only two native Indonesians to obtain a multi-engine pilot badge (Groot Militaire Brevet).

== Career ==
In 1939, Adisutjipto was assigned to the reconnaissance squadron in the Royal Netherlands East Indies Army Air Force (Militaire Luchtvaart van het Koninklijk Nederlands-Indisch Leger / ML-KNIL) with the rank of second lieutenant (2e Luitenant), appointed as adjudant of Kapitein' Clason (a senior officer ML-KNIL), and appointed as secretary of ML-KNIL. He held those position until the invasion of the Dutch East Indies by Japan in 1942. Most ML-KNIL pilots then retreated to Australia, but he opted to stay in Java and was relieved from his duty.

In 1945, he joined the Republic of Indonesia Armed Forces to assist in the establishment of the Indonesian Air Force. He was tasked to establish the Flight School in Yogyakarta, in the Maguwo Air Field—which was later renamed Adisucipto Airport to commemorate his services as a national hero.

On 27 October 1945, he flew a Yokosuka K5Y (locally referred as "Cureng") around Yogyakarta, thus making him the first pilot of the newly born Indonesian Air Force to fly an aircraft.

During the first of two major Dutch police actions against the Republic of Indonesia, Operation Product, Adisujipto and Abdul Rahman Saleh were ordered to fly to India. They successfully breached the air blockade conducted by the Dutch air force, covering the airspace from Indonesia to India and Pakistan. However, during their journey back from Singapore, while transporting donated medical supplies from the Red Cross of Malaya at Singapore, their Dakota aircraft was shot down by two Dutch P-40 Kittyhawk aircraft in Dusun Ngoto on 29 July 1947, even though Indonesia had asked permission from the Netherlands to deliver medical supplies. The remains of their Dakota VT-CLA can be seen at the Dirgantara Mandala Museum. He was buried in the Kuncen I and II general cemetery.

== Recognition ==
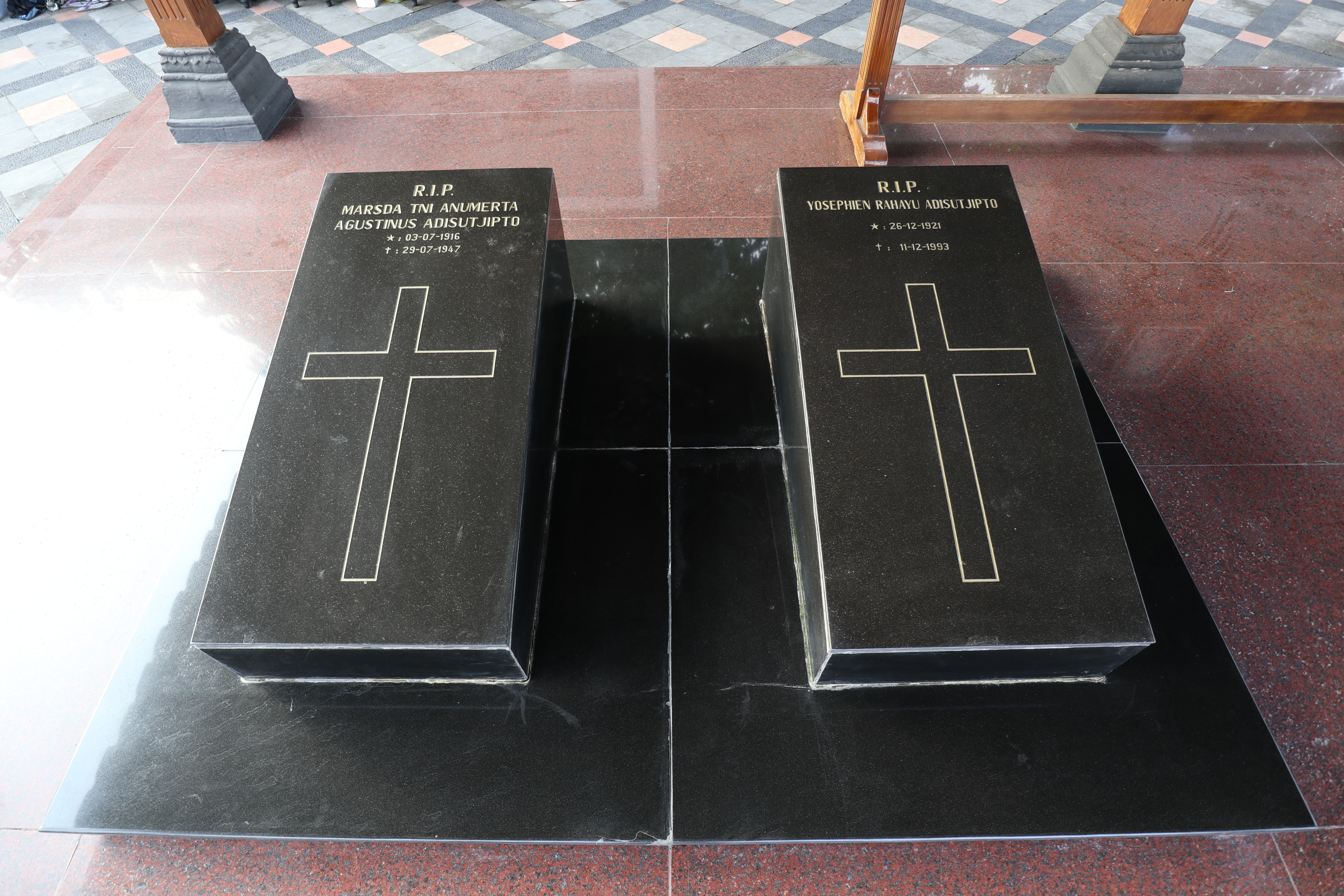
Grave of Agustinus Adisutjipto

On 17 August 1952, the Indonesian Air Force renamed the Adisutjipto Air Force Base in Yogyakarta after him. This air force base also serves civil aviation for the city.

On 9 November 1974, Adisutjipto was posthumously promoted to air vice-marshal and named a National Hero of Indonesia by the President on behalf of the nation.

On 14 July 2000, his remains were re-interred in the Monumen Perjuangan (Monument of Struggle) in Dusun Ngoto, Bantul, Yogyakarta.
