= Abdulrahman Saleh (physician) =

Indonesian physician (1909–1947)

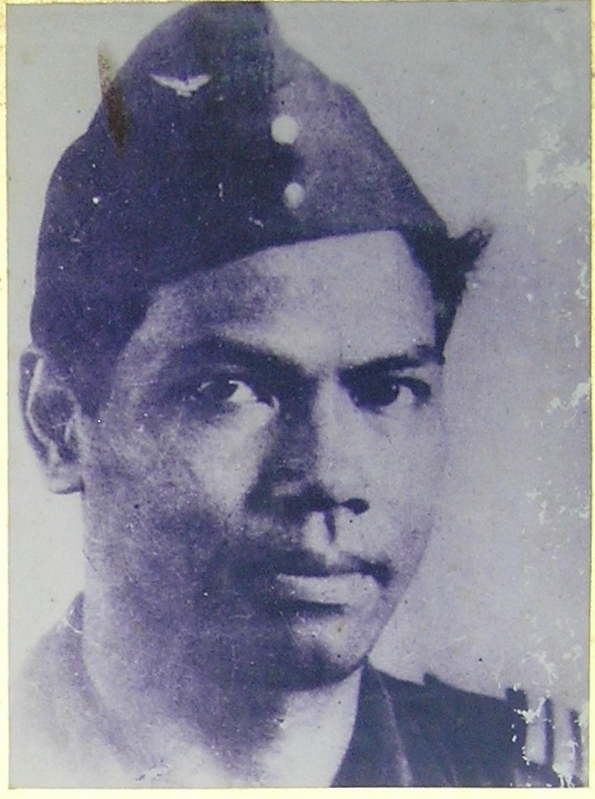
- Born: 1 July 1909; Batavia, Dutch East Indies
- Died: 29 July 1947 (aged 38); Ngoto, Maguwoharjo, Yogyakarta, Indonesia
- Burial place: Ngoto, Maguwoharjo, Yogyakarta
- Military career
- Allegiance: Indonesia
- Branch: Indonesian Air Force
- Service years: c. 1945–1947
- Rank: Air Vice-Marshal (posthumously)
- Nickname: Karbol
- Awards: National Hero of Indonesia

Abdulrahman Saleh (1 July 1909 – 29 July 1947) was an Indonesian physician and aviator whose plane was shot down by the Dutch during the Indonesian National Revolution. He was also a co-founder of Radio Republik Indonesia. He was posthumously declared a National Hero of Indonesia in 1974.

== Early life ==
Abdulrahman was born in Ketapang village (West Kwitang), Batavia, Dutch East Indies (today Jakarta, Indonesia) on 1 July 1909. His parents were Mohammad Saleh, a well-known physician, and Emma Naimah Saleh (née Moehsin). He followed in his father's path and studied to become a doctor in a medical college for Indonesians, School Tot Opleiding van Inlandsche Artsen (STOVIA). As STOVIA was closed down before the completion of his study, he continued his studies at another medical college, Geneeskundige Hoge School (GHS). Due to his curly hair, his friends began to call him "Karbol" taken from the Dutch word Krullebol meaning "curly hair".

During his time in medical college, he joined various youth organizations such as Jong Java, the scouting organization Indonesische Padvinderij Organisatie and other sports clubs. He also developed an interest in radio broadcasting and aviation. He joined an aviation club in Batavia and managed to obtain a pilot license.

== Career ==
After completing his medical studies in 1937, he pursued further studies in physiology and became a lecturer at the medical college Nederlandsch-Indische Artsen School (NIAS) in Surabaya in 1942. He later returned to Batavia as a lecturer at his alma mater, GHS, and was promoted to full professor.

Outside of his medical career, Saleh was also appointed as head of a radio broadcasting organization named Vereniging voor Oosterse Radio Omroep (VORO) and was later involved in the establishment of an Indonesian Public Broadcasting Institute (Radio Republik Indonesia / RRI) on 11 September 1945.

After he was satisfied that the Indonesian radio institute was in good hands, he resigned from his position there and joined the Republic of Indonesia Armed Forces to assist in the establishment of the Indonesian Air Force with Agustinus Adisutjipto, his former student in GHS. He then served as flight instructor in the newly established Flight School in Yogyakarta, in the Maguwo Air Field.

During the first of two major Dutch police actions against the Republic of Indonesia, Operation Product, Saleh, and Adisujipto were ordered to fly to India. They successfully breached the air blockade conducted by the Dutch Air Force, covering the airspace from Indonesia to India and Pakistan. However, during their journey back from Singapore, while transporting donated medical supplies from the Red Cross of Malaya at Singapore, their Dakota aircraft was shot down by two Dutch P-40 Kittyhawk aircraft in Dusun Ngoto on 29 July 1947, even though Indonesia had asked permission from the Netherlands to deliver medical supplies. The remains of their Dakota VT-CLA can be seen in the Dirgantara Mandala Museum.

== Recognition ==
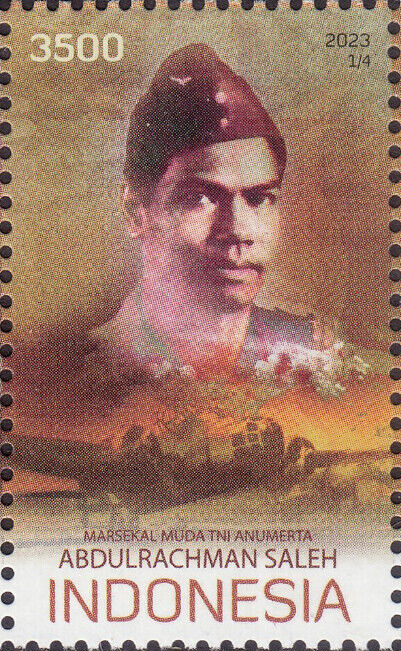
Saleh on a 2023 stamp of Indonesia

On 17 August 1952, the Indonesian Air Force renamed the Abdulrahman Saleh Air Force Base in Malang, East Java after him. This Air Force Base also serves civil aviation for the city.

On 5 December 1958, The faculty of medicine of the University of Indonesia honored him as Indonesia's father of Physiology. The annual Medical and General Biology Competition is called the Abdulrahman Saleh Trophy.

Starting in August 1965, the Indonesian Air Force Academy officially adopted Saleh's nickname of Karbol to refer to all cadets of the Academy to honor his service.

On 9 November 1974, for his services to the country before and after the independence of Indonesia, Abdul Rahman Saleh was posthumously promoted to Air Vice-Marshal and named an Indonesia National Hero by the President on behalf of the nation.

In 2000, based on an Indonesian Air Force initiative and family approval, his grave was relocated from Kuncen cemetery to Ngoto, near the crash site. Many friends and supporters came to lay him to rest and thanked him for his service. The new grave is part of the Indonesian Air Force's Monument Perjuangan Ngoto, together with the graves of Mrs. Ismudiati Abdulrahman Saleh, Agustinus Adisucipto, and Mrs. Adisucipto.
