= Operation Product =

1947 Dutch military offensive in Indonesia during the National Revolution

- Part of the Police Actions of the Indonesian National Revolution
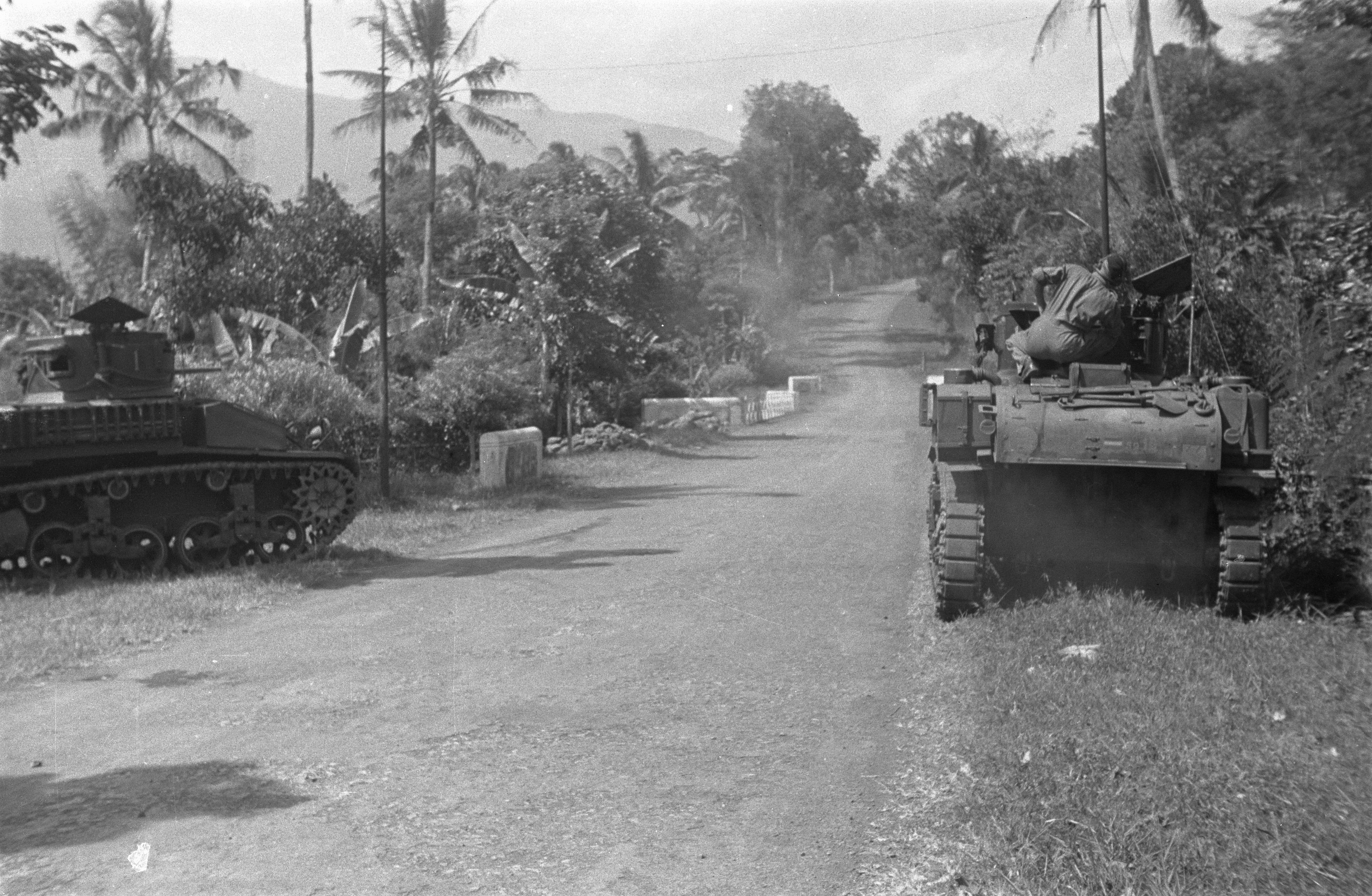
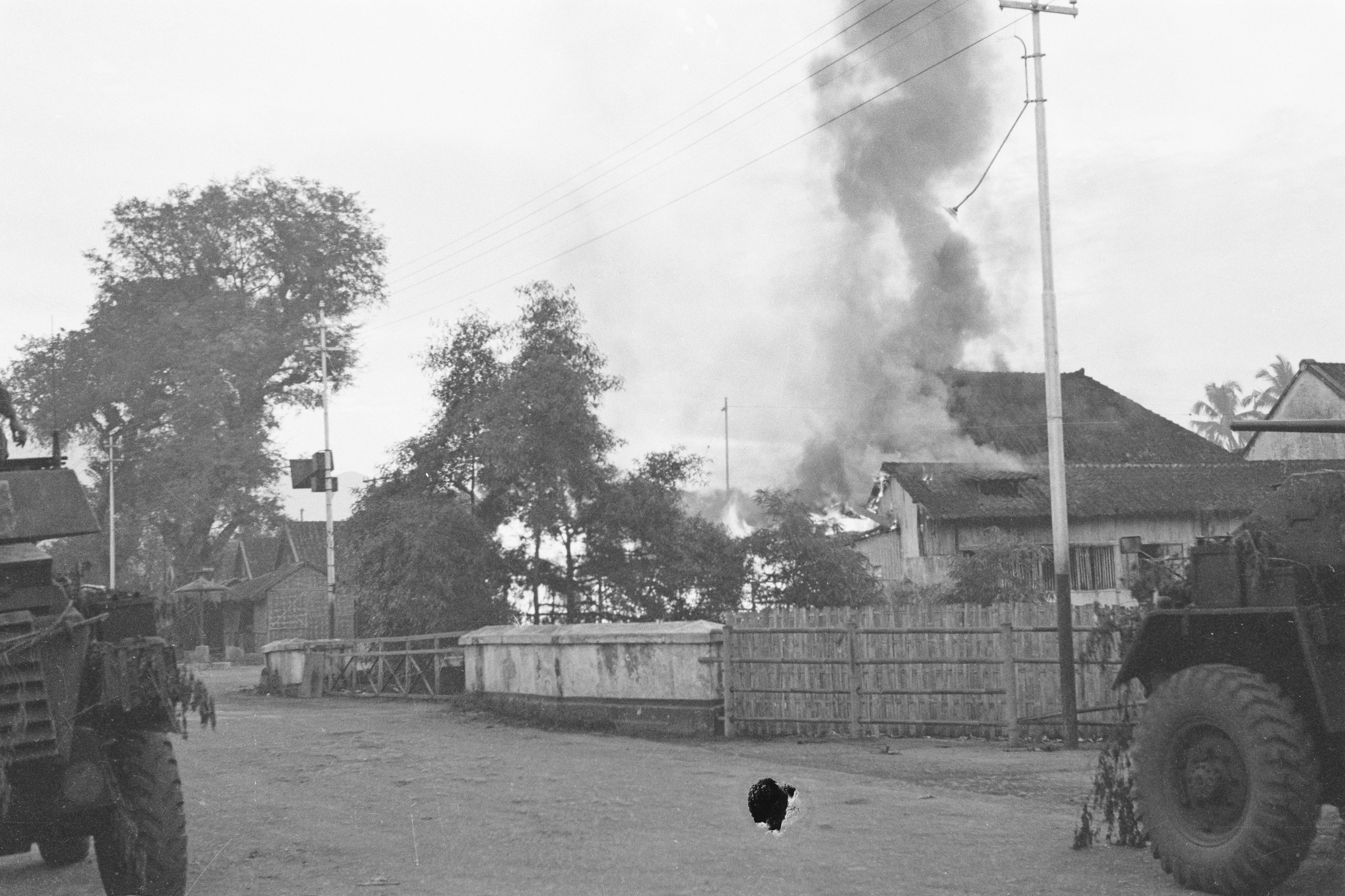
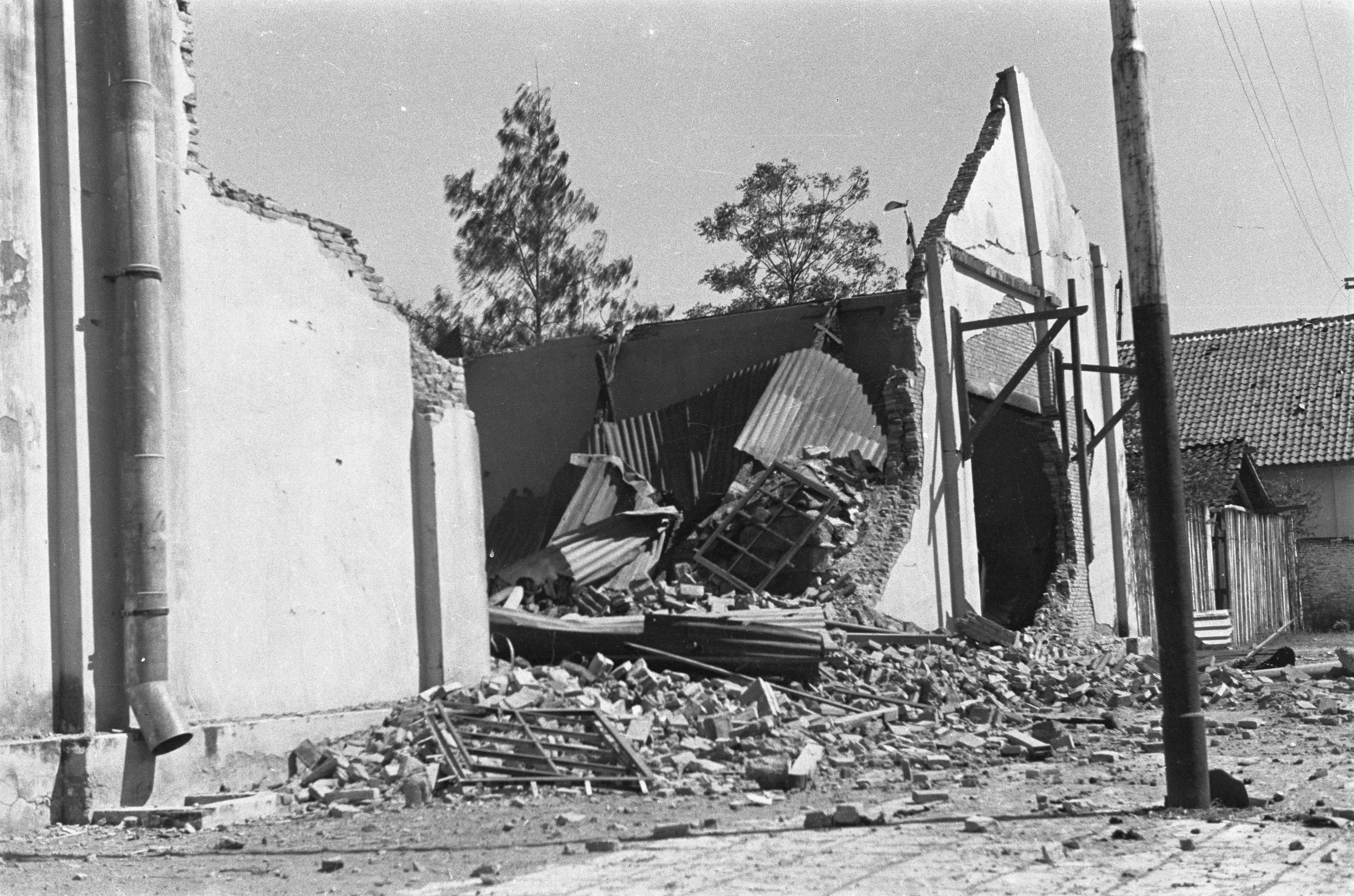
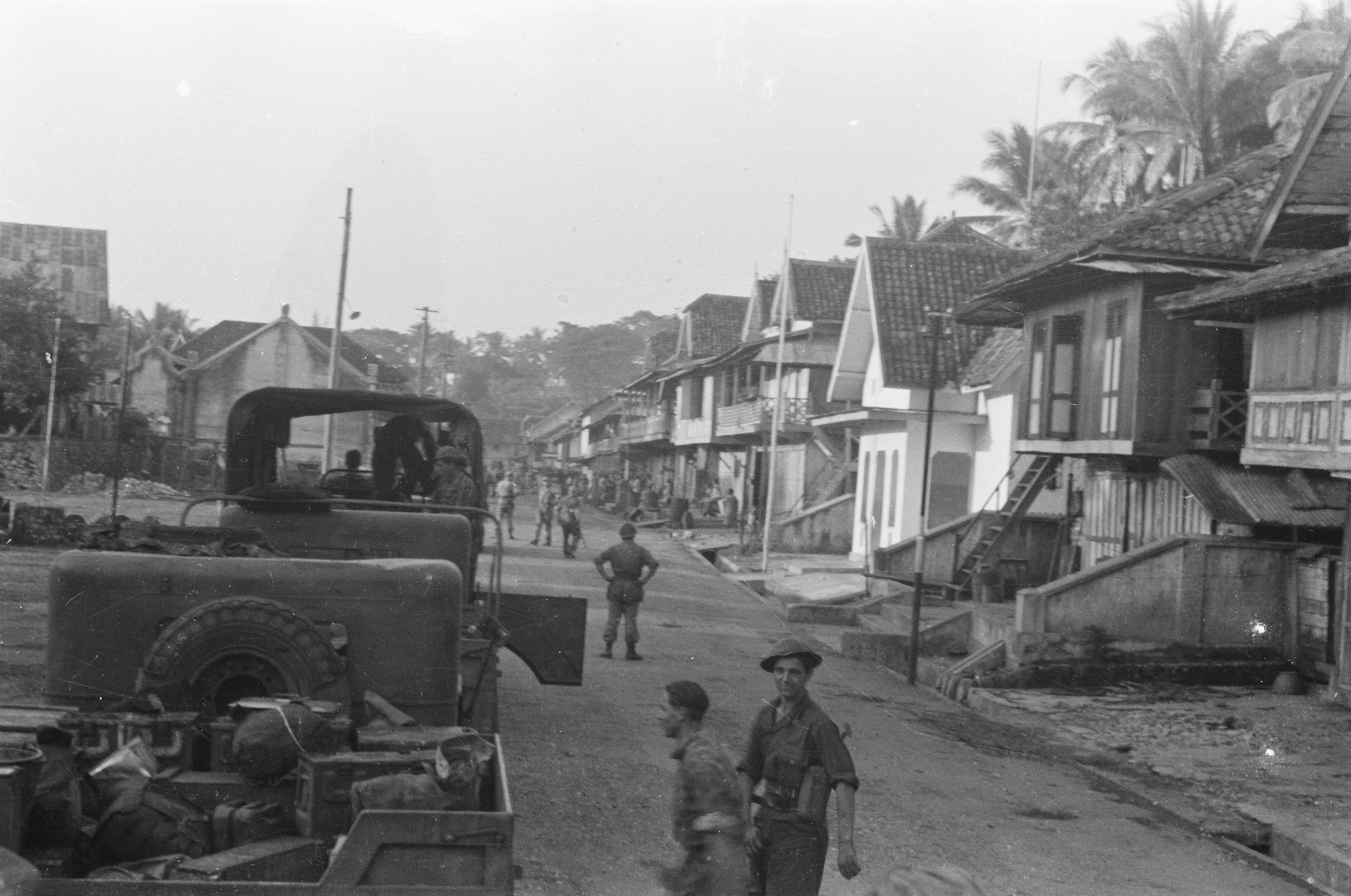
- Clockwise from top left: • Dutch troops in Ambarawa • Burning sector houses in Cheribon • Battalion Shock Troops in Baturadja, South Sumatra • One of the destroyed harbor sheds of Tegal
Date	21 July – 5 August 1947 (2 weeks and 1 day)
Location	Java and Sumatra, Indonesia
Result	Dutch victory
Territorial changes	Dutch forces recapture the economic centre of Sumatra and the Port of Java

Belligerents
Indonesia	Netherlands

Commanders and leaders
Sudirman; Oerip Soemohardjo	Simon Hendrik Spoor; Hubertus van Mook

Units involved
	3 divisions in Java; 3 brigades in Sumatra

Strength
~200,000	~120,000

Casualties and losses
4,000 casualties (including in Operation Kraai)	74 killed 178 wounded 16 missing

Operation Product was a Dutch military offensive against areas of Java and Sumatra controlled by the de facto Republic of Indonesia during the Indonesian National Revolution. It took place between 21 July and 4 August 1947. Referred to by the Dutch as the First Police Action (Eerste Politionele Actie), in Indonesian history books and military records the military offensive is more commonly known as the First Dutch Military Aggression (Agresi Militer Belanda I).

The offensive was launched in violation of the Linggadjati Agreement between the de facto Republic and the Netherlands. The offensive resulted in the Dutch reducing Republican-held areas to smaller areas of Java and Sumatra, split by Dutch-held areas.

== Background ==
The approximately 120,000 inactive Dutch soldiers, which included significant number of Dutch-born conscripts, in Java were a significant financial burden on the Netherlands after the ravages of World War II. By May 1947, the Dutch had decided they needed to directly attack the Republic to access commodities in Republican-held areas, in particular sugar in Java and oil and rubber in Sumatra. Frustrated by deadlocked negotiations of Linggadjati Agreement between the Netherlands and the de facto Republic Indonesia, the Netherlands abrogated the treaty and conducted military offensive toward Indonesian held territories. The offensive was also influenced by a Dutch perception that the de facto Republic had failed to curb the influence of Indonesian Chinese, Indonesian Indians and the rising Indonesian Communist Party.

The Dutch military estimated they would need two weeks to secure Republican-held cities and six months for the whole of the Republican territory. The offensive was intended to not include an attack on Yogyakarta, seat of the Republican government, due to high expected costs of fighting there.

== Offensive ==
On 21 July, the Dutch, whose forces were armed with US produced lend-lease equipment and trained in modern warcraft, deployed three divisions in Java and three brigades in less-densely populated Sumatra. Operation Product in East Java consisted of three landing operations: Product North in Pasir Poetih, Situbondo, Product South in Meneng Bay, north of Banyuwangi, and Product East in Porong, Sidoarjo. Landings were supported by destroyers, corvettes, minesweepers, patrol vessels, landing ships and vessels such as LSTs, LCIs, LCTs and LCVPs, tugboats and pontoons from Surabaya. The operation resulted in the occupation of large, economically productive parts of Java and Sumatra. Republican army (Tentara Nasional Indonesia or TNI) tried to slow the Dutch advance by blowing up bridges, setting up roadblocks, laying ambushes and detonating roadside bombs. The aim of this was to be able to bring their troops to safety and, if possible, to apply the scorched earth tactic. A direct confrontation with the Dutch troops, who had much greater firepower, was avoided as much as possible.

Nevertheless, the TNI and its allies continued to conduct guerrilla operations from the rural areas in Dutch-controlled territory. The Dutch retaliated with air strikes and a blockade of Republican-held areas. However, the Dutch were held back from full conquest of the Republic because of pressure from the UN Security Council, and by the United States, who were calling for a ceasefire. By 2 August 1947, the Dutch government ordered overall Dutch military commander to stop advancing, and a halt to the offensive was just before midnight on 4 August. Between the order and the halt of the offensive, the Dutch landed on and captured half of Madura Island.

== Aftermath ==
The operation is rated as a military and economical success, as the Dutch managed to take over economically productive areas in Java and Sumatra, but a political setback as it attracted international attention to what was previously seen as an internal Dutch politic, and thus condemnation from other countries. Despite the government of the State of East Indonesia expressing support for the Dutch action, international pressure led to a ceasefire in January 1948 followed by a formal armistice. As a consequence, what was previously considered to be an internal Dutch affair now took on an international dimension. The Renville Agreement, as the armistice was called, stipulated the withdrawal of Indonesian forces from Dutch-occupied territory, the lifting of the Dutch naval blockade, and the establishment of a ceasefire boundary known as the Status Quo Line or Van Mook Line. Both sides soon accused the other of breaking the armistice, with the Dutch complaining about pro-Indonesian insurgency behind the Van Mook Line. Meanwhile, Indonesia and third-party observers, including the Committee of Good Behavior, found not only the Dutch still maintained their naval blockade but also erected new land blockades on their side of Van Mook Line, and unilaterally created several (powerless) ethnic states in areas they conquered, when Linggadjati stated that the creation of a new federal state must be agreed by both the Netherlands and Indonesia. Mutual distrust between the two sides, growing tension, and the belief that Indonesia was weakened by Darul Islam and the socialist Madiun Affair, led the Netherlands to conduct a second military offensive code-named Operation Kraai.

== See also ==
- Air raids on Semarang–Salatiga–Ambarawa
- 1947 Yogyakarta Dakota incident
- Rawagede massacre
- Operation Kraai
