= IATA (disambiguation) =

IATA is the International Air Transport Association, an international industry trade group.

IATA may also refer to:

- IATA airport code, a three-letter code designating many airports around the world
- IATA airline designator, unique two-character code to identify an airline
- IATA delay codes

== See also ==
- List of IATA-indexed railway stations
