= AIDX =

XML messaging standard

Aviation Information Data Exchange (AIDX) is the global XML messaging standard for exchanging flight data between airlines, airports, and any third party consuming the data. It is endorsed as a recommended standard by the International Air Transport Association (IATA), and the Airports Council International (ACI).

== History ==
The development of AIDX began in 2005 and launched in October 2008 as a combined effort of over 80 airlines, airports and vendors. To date, it consists of 180 distinct data elements, including flight identification, operational times, disruption details, resource requirement, passenger, baggage, fuel and cargo statistics, and aircraft details. The goal of the project was to standardize information exchange and tackle problems of disruption for a variety of use cases.
