= IATA delay codes =

2-digit codes for designating air-travel delay situations

IATA delay codes were created to standardise the reporting by airlines of commercial flight departure delays. Previously, every airline had its own system, which made the sharing and aggregation of flight delay information difficult. IATA standardised the flight delay reporting format by using codes that attribute cause and responsibility for the delay; this supports aviation administration and logistics and helps to define any penalties arising. These codes are used in movement messages sent electronically by SITA from the departure airport to the destination airport and also in the internal administration of the airlines, airports and ground handling agents.

An aircraft held on the ground incurs costs, consequently airlines plan operations to minimise ground time. It is common practice for airlines and aircraft ground handling to have contracts based on a bonus–malus system, penalising the causative agent for delays caused. Delay code properties cover nine category sets for delay. Each category set can be described using either a two-digit number code or a two letter alpha code; most airlines use the numeric format, but some prefer the alpha. Messaging standards, such as the AHM 780 Aircraft Movement Message specification, specify that only the numeric codes should be used. Many airlines further subdivide the IATA codes with an additional character, for more granular delay analysis, but these are not standardized. In the AHM 780 specification, the two-character numeric-only codes are sent in the DL and EDL elements along with the time assigned to each code (e.g. DL31/62/0005/0015 showing reason 31 for 5 mins and reason 62 for 15 minutes), and the three-character alphanumeric codes are sent in the DLA element (e.g. DLA31C/62A// showing subreason C for code 31 and subreason A for code 62).

== Delay codes starting with 0 (internal) ==
Delay codes starting with 0 are used for internal airline purposes. Airlines are free to define these codes and to determine particular application fields.

However the following codes are standard, even if some airlines do not use them and create their own customized delay codes:

- 00–05: These codes are left blank so that each airline may develop codes specifically to meet their own individual requirements, e.g., 03: "Three-class system" moving curtain.
- 06 (OA): No gate/stand availability due to own airline activity
- 07: Aircraft connection by maintenance
- 08: Aircraft connection by miscellaneous, traffic, marketing flight operations, ground handling, cabin services, etc.
- 09 (SG): Scheduled ground time less than declared minimum ground time

== Delay codes starting with 1 (passenger/baggage) ==
These Codes are used to describe delays caused by Passenger and Baggage handling.

- 11 (PD): Late check-in, acceptance of passengers after deadline
- 12 (PL): Late check-in, congestion in check-in area
- 13 (PE): Check-in error
- 14 (PO): Oversales, booking errors
- 15 (PH): Boarding, discrepancies and paging, missing checked-in passenger at gate
- 16 (PS): Commercial Publicity, Passenger Convenience, VIP, Press, Ground meals and missing personal items
- 17 (PC): Catering order, late or incorrect order given to supplier
- 18 (PB): Baggage processing, sorting, etc.
- 19 (PW): Reduced Mobility, Boarding/Deboarding of passengers with reduced mobility

== Delay codes starting with 2 (cargo/mail) ==
These Codes are used to describe delays caused by Cargo (21-26) and Mail Handling (27-29).

- 21 (CD): Documentation, errors, etc.
- 22 (CP): Late positioning
- 23 (CC): Late acceptance
- 24 (CI): Inadequate packing
- 25 (CO): Oversales, booking errors
- 26 (CU): Late preparation in warehouse
- 27 (CE): Mail Oversales, packing, etc.
- 28 (CL): Mail Late positioning
- 29 (CA): Mail Late acceptance

== Delay codes starting with 3 (handling) ==
These Codes are used to describe delays caused by aircraft and ramp handling.

- 31 (GD): Aircraft documentation late or inaccurate, weight and balance (Loadsheet), general declaration, passenger manifest, etc.
- 32 (GL): Loading, Unloading, bulky/special load, cabin load, lack of loading staff
- 33 (GE): Loading Equipment, lack of or breakdown, e.g. container pallet loader, lack of staff
- 34 (GS): Servicing Equipment, lack of or breakdown, lack of staff, e.g. steps
- 35 (GC): Aircraft Cleaning
- 36 (GF): Fuelling, Defuelling, fuel supplier
- 37 (GB): Catering, late delivery or loading
- 38 (GU): ULD, Containers, pallets, lack of or breakdown
- 39 (GT): Technical equipment, lack of or breakdown, lack of staff, e.g. pushback

== Delay codes starting with 4 (technical) ==
These codes are used to describe technical delay reasons.

- 41 (TD): Aircraft defects
- 42 (TM): Scheduled maintenance, late release
- 43 (TN): Non-scheduled maintenance, special checks and / or additional works beyond normal maintenance
- 44 (TS): Spares and maintenance equipment, lack of or breakdown
- 45 (TA): AOG (Aircraft on ground for technical reasons) Spares, to be carried to another station
- 46 (TC): Aircraft change for technical reasons
- 47 (TL): Standby aircraft, lack of planned standby aircraft for technical reasons
- 48 (TV): Scheduled cabin configuration and version adjustment

== Delay codes starting with 5 (damage/failure) ==
These Codes are used to describe damage to aircraft and automated equipment failure.

- 51 (DF): Damage during flight operations, bird or lightning strike, turbulence, heavy or overweight landing
- 52 (DG): Damage during ground operations, collisions (other than during taxiing), loading/offloading damage, contamination, towing, extreme weather conditions.
- 55 (ED): Departure Control System, Check-in, weight and balance (loadcontrol), computer system error, baggage sorting, gate-reader error or problems
- 56 (EC): Cargo preparation/documentation system
- 57 (EF): Flight plans
- 58 (EO): Other computer systems

== Delay codes starting with 6 (operation) ==
These codes are assigned to Operations and Crew caused delays.

- 61 (FP): Flight plan, late completion or change of flight documentation
- 62 (FF): Operational requirements, fuel, load alteration
- 63 (FT): Late crew boarding or departure procedures
- 64 (FS): Flight deck crew shortage, Crew rest
- 65 (FR): Flight deck crew special request or error not within operational requirements
- 66 (FL): Late cabin crew boarding or departure procedures
- 67 (FC): Cabin crew shortage
- 68 (FA): Cabin crew error or special request
- 69 (FB): Captain request for security check, extraordinary

== Delay codes starting with 7 (weather) ==
These Codes explain weather caused delays.

- 71 (WO): Departure station
- 72 (WT): Destination station
- 73 (WR): En route or Alternate
- 75 (WI): De-Icing of aircraft, removal of ice/snow, frost prevention
- 76 (WS): Removal of snow/ice/water/sand from airport/runway
- 77 (WG): Ground handling impaired by adverse weather conditions

== Delay codes starting with 8 (air traffic control) ==
These Codes are used for Air Traffic Control (ATC) Restrictions (81-84) and Airport or Governmental Authorities caused delays.

- 81 (AT): ATC restriction en-route or capacity
- 82 (AX): ATC restriction due to staff shortage or equipment failure en-route
- 83 (AE): ATC restriction at destination
- 84 (AW): ATC restriction due to weather at destination
- 85 (AS): Mandatory security
- 86 (AG): Immigration, Customs, Health
- 87 (AF): Airport Facilities, parking stands, ramp congestion, buildings, gate limitations, etc.
- 88 (AD): Restrictions at airport of destination, airport/runway closed due obstruction, industrial action, staff shortage, political unrest, noise abatement, night curfew, special flights, etc.
- 89 (AM): Restrictions at airport of departure, airport/runway closed due obstruction, industrial action, staff shortage, political unrest, noise abatement, night curfew, special flights, start-up and pushback, etc.

== Delay codes starting with 9 (miscellaneous) ==
Codes used for reactionary reasons or Miscellaneous.

- 91 (RL): Passenger or Load Connection, awaiting load or passengers from another flight, protection of stranded passengers onto a new flight
- 92 (RT): Through Check-in error, passenger and baggage
- 93 (RA): Aircraft rotation, late arrival of aircraft from another flight or previous sector
- 94 (RS): Cabin crew rotation
- 95 (RC): Crew rotation, awaiting crew from another flight (flight deck or entire crew)
- 96 (RO): Operations control, rerouting, diversion, consolidation, aircraft change for reasons other than technical
- 97 (MI): Industrial action within own airline
- 98 (MO): Industrial action outside own airline, excluding ATS
- 99 (MX): Miscellaneous, not elsewhere specified
