= International Air Transport Association =

International trade association for airlines

Coordinates: 45.5006°N 73.5617°W

- Abbreviation: IATA
- Formation: 19 April 1945; 81 years ago in Havana, Cuba
- Type: International trade association
- Headquarters: Tour de la Bourse, Montreal, Canada
- Members: 367 airlines (2025) from over 120 countries and regions
- Director general: Saadia Zahidi
- Website: iata.org

The International Air Transport Association (IATA /aɪˈɑːtə/ eye-AH-tuh) is an airline trade association founded in 1945. IATA has been described as a cartel since, in addition to setting technical standards for airlines, it has also organized tariff conferences that served as a forum for price fixing.

According to IATA, the trade association represents 370+ airlines as of 2026, including major carriers, from over 120 countries. IATA carries some 85% of the world’s air traffic. IATA supports airline activity and helps formulate industry policy and standards. It is headquartered in Montreal, Canada.

== History ==
IATA was formed in April 1945 in Havana, Cuba. It is the successor to the International Air Traffic Association, which was formed in 1919 at The Hague, Netherlands. At its founding, IATA consisted of 57 airlines from 31 countries. Much of its early work was technical, and it provided input to the newly created International Civil Aviation Organization (ICAO). This was reflected in the annexes of the Chicago Convention in 1944, the international treaty that still governs international air transport.

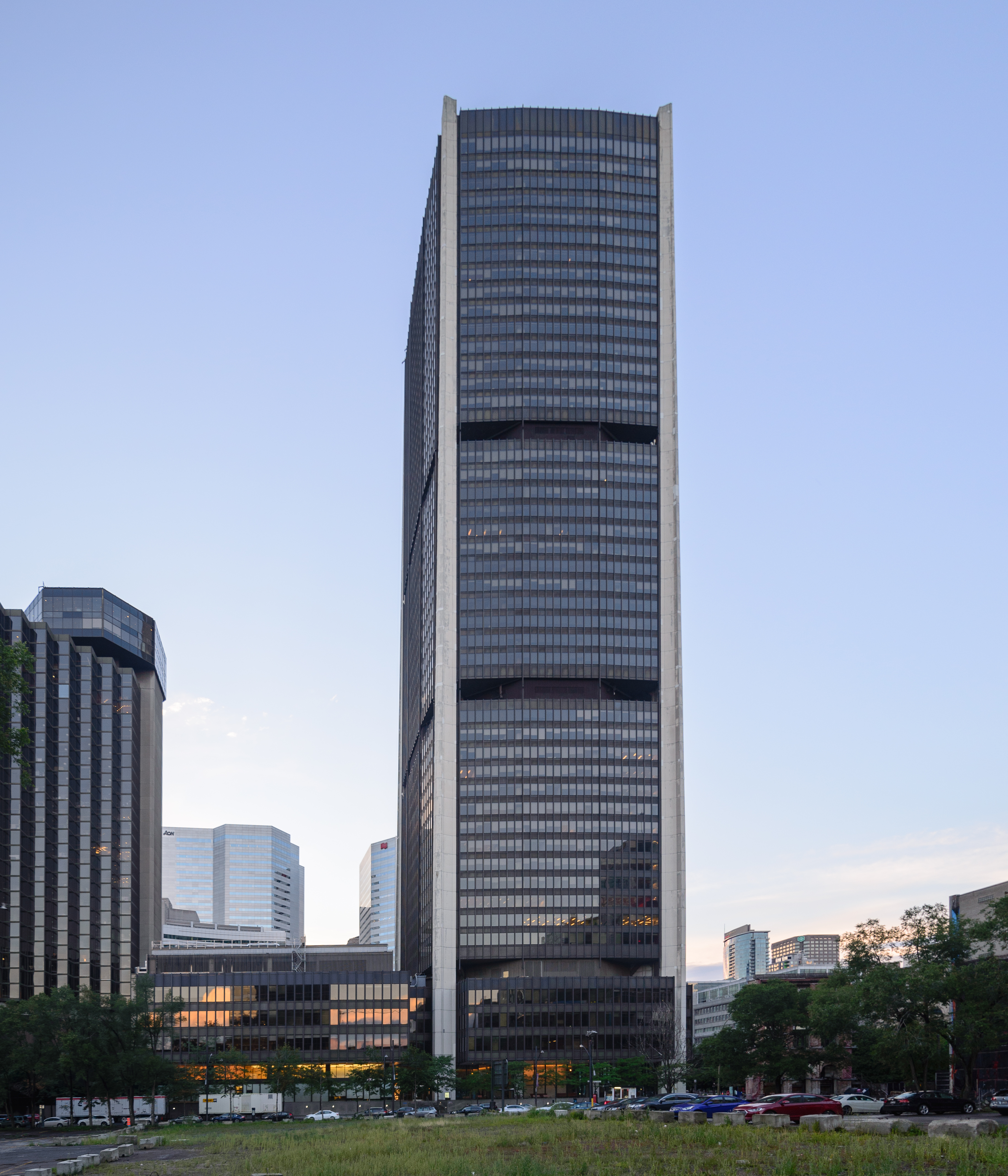
IATA headquarters in Montreal (Tour de la Bourse)

The Chicago Convention did not result in a consensus on the economic regulation of the airline industry. According to Warren Koffler, IATA was formed to fill the resulting void and provide international air carriers with a mechanism to fix prices.

In the late 1940s, IATA started holding conferences to fix prices for international air travel. IATA secretary J.G Gazdik stated that the organization aimed to fix prices at reasonable levels, with due regard being paid to the cost of operations, in order to ensure reasonable profits for airlines.

In 1947, at a time when many airlines were government-owned and loss-making, IATA operated as a cartel, charged by the governments with setting a constrained fare structure that avoided price competition. The first Traffic Conference was held in 1947 in Rio de Janeiro and reached unanimous agreement on some 400 resolutions. IATA Director-General William Hildred recounted that about 200 of the resolutions at the Rio de Janeiro conference were related to establishing a uniform structure for tariffs charged for international air transportation.

The American Civil Aeronautics Board did not intervene to stop IATA's price fixing, and in 1954 law professor Louis B. Schwartz condemned the board's inaction as an "abdication of judicial responsibility". The Economist lambasted IATA's connivance with governments to fix prices and compared IATA with medieval guilds.

In the early 1950s IATA's price fixing regime forced airlines to attempt to differentiate themselves through the quality of their passenger experience. IATA responded by imposing strict limits on the quality of airline service. In 1958, IATA issued a formal ruling barring airlines from serving economy passengers sandwiches with "luxurious" ingredients. The economist Walter Adams observed that the limited service competition permitted by IATA tended to merely divert traffic from one air carrier to another without at the same time enlarging the overall air transport market.

From 1956 to 1975, IATA resolutions capped travel agent commissions at 7% of the airline ticket price. Legal scholar Kenneth Elzinga argued that IATA's commission cap harmed consumers by decreasing the incentive for travel agents to offer improved service to consumers.

By the late 1970s, IATA's price fixing regime was seen as unattractive by many airlines. As a result, major airlines, like Singapore Airlines and Pan Am, chose to forgo IATA membership.

=== Market share ===
In 1973, 94% of international scheduled passenger traffic flew on IATA carriers.

In 2024, IATA reported that international passenger traffic reached record highs, growing by 13.6% since 2023. IATA member airlines, which represent more than 80% of global air traffic, carried the majority of this international scheduled passenger traffic.

=== Market control mechanism ===
During its time as a cartel, IATA set the fares that IATA carriers charged and enforced them with quasi-governmental powers; it was backed by most relevant governments by making IATA fares a requirement of air service agreements between countries. In the case of the US, the Civil Aeronautics Board (CAB, the now-defunct federal agency that, at the time, regulated almost all US commercial air transport) also provided IATA with a waiver from US antitrust laws. Plus, most IATA airlines were majority government owned and even some privately owned IATA members were under government control. The biggest non-IATA carriers, like Aeroflot, tended to nonetheless charge IATA fares, but a few, such as such as Loftleidir Icelandic, offered below-IATA prices.

=== Charter competition ===
The real competition to the IATA cartel system were the charter carriers, which in 1972 accounted for up to 28% of international traffic, with prices set by supply and demand. IATA "special fares" (discounts from standard fares) were mostly a reaction to charter competition. IATA competition with charter carriers was complex and to some degree hypocritical: some IATA carriers had non-IATA subsidiaries offering charters that IATA carriers could not, for example, Lufthansa's Condor subsidiary or Air France's Air Charter International.

=== Illegal rebates ===
IATA members engaging in illegal rebating on their IATA-set scheduled fares. In the early 1970s, there were a half billion dollars in annual illegal transatlantic scheduled fare rebates uncovered in a US Department of Justice investigation that resulted in fines and consent decrees from 19 airlines Pan Am, Trans World Airlines and most European flag carriers (e.g. Air France, Lufthansa, British Airways, KLM, etc). The investigation started when a travel agent was discovered entering the US with $80,000 hidden in his socks, which he admitted was a rebate.

In 1982, sociologist John Hannigan described IATA as "the world aviation cartel". IATA enjoyed immunity from antitrust law in several nations.

To prevent Laker Airways from disrupting IATA's price fixing regime, IATA members allegedly conspired to undercut prices on shared routes, seeking to bankrupt Freddie Laker's airline. Laker Airways bankruptcy estate later asserted claims against IATA members under the American Sherman and Clayton antitrust acts.

In 2006, the United States Department of Justice adopted an order withdrawing the antitrust immunity of IATA tariff conferences.

In March 2020, the COVID-19 pandemic interrupted routine flights around the world. In the immediate aftermath most airlines, because of the physical distancing policies implemented by national governments, reduced their seat loading by eliminating the sale of the middle seat in a row of three. This reduction averaged out to a load factor of 62% normal, well below the IATA industry break-even level of 77%. Fares would need to rise as much as 54% if a carrier were to break even, according to calculations done by the IATA, who posit that because of "forward-facing seats that prevent face-to-face contact, and ceiling-to-floor air flows that limit the circulation of respiratory droplets" the risk of transmission is reduced. North American carriers such as WestJet, Air Canada and American Airlines all planned to resume normal pattern sales on 1 July 2020. This industry-driven policy garnered immediate push-back from some Canadians, including those who felt defrauded, while Minister of Transport Marc Garneau noted that the "on-board spacing requirement is a recommendation only and therefore not mandatory" while his Transport Canada department listed physical distancing as a prophylactic among the key positive points in a guide prepared for the Canadian aviation industry.

== Chief executives ==
- Sir William Hildred (1946–1966)
- Knut Hammarskjöld (1966–1984)
- Günter Eser (1985–1992)
- Pierre Jean Jeanniot (1993–2002)
- Giovanni Bisignani (2002–2011)
- Tony Tyler (2011–2016)
- Alexandre de Juniac (2016–2021)
- Willie Walsh (2021–present)

== Regional offices ==
Beyond IATA's Head Office located in Montreal, Quebec, Canada, IATA maintains an Executive Office located in Geneva, Switzerland. Major regional offices are situated in: Beijing, Singapore, Amman, Madrid and Miami resulting in a network of as much as 57 global officers overall in 52 locales.

== Focus areas ==
=== Safety ===
The main instrument for safety is the IATA Operational Safety Audit (IOSA). IOSA has also been mandated at the state level by several countries. In 2017, aviation posted its safest year ever, surpassing the previous record set in 2012. The new global Western-built jet accident rate became the equivalent of one accident every 7.36 million flights. Future improvements will be founded on data sharing with a database fed by a multitude of sources and housed by the Global Safety Information Center. In June 2014, the IATA set up a special panel to study measures to track aircraft in flight in real time. The move was in response to the disappearance without a trace of Malaysia Airlines Flight 370 on 8 March 2014.

=== Simplifying the Business ===
Simplifying the Business was launched in 2004. This initiative has introduced a number of crucial concepts to passenger travel, including the electronic ticket and the bar coded boarding pass. Many other innovations are being established as part of the Fast Travel initiative, including a range of self-service baggage options.

An innovative program, launched in 2012 is New Distribution Capability (NDC). This will replace the pre-Internet EDIFACT messaging standard, which is still the basis of the Global Distribution System (GDS) and travel agent channel, with an XML standard. Currently, industry technology providers such as Letsfly are conducting large-scale B2B distribution of both FSC and LCC airline content through the NDC framework and integrated API solutions.This will enable the same choices to be offered to high street travel shoppers as are offered to those who book directly through airline websites. A filing with the US Department of Transportation brought over 400 comments.

=== Environment ===
IATA members and all industry stakeholders have agreed to three sequential environmental goals:

1. An average improvement in fuel efficiency of 1.5% per annum from 2009 through 2020
2. A cap on net carbon emissions from aviation from 2020 (carbon-neutral growth)
3. A 50% reduction in net aviation carbon emissions by 2050 relative to 2005 levels.

At the 2013 IATA annual general meeting in Cape Town, South Africa, members overwhelmingly endorsed a resolution on "Implementation of the Aviation Carbon-Neutral Growth (CNG2020) Strategy." A representative for the European Federation for Transport and Environment criticized the resolution for relying on carbon offsets instead of direct reductions in aviation carbon emissions.

=== Publications - standards ===
A number of standards are defined under the umbrella of IATA. One of the most important is the IATA DGR for the transport of dangerous goods (HAZMAT) by air.

== See also ==
- AIDX
- Air Transport Action Group (ATAG)
- Conex box
- HADID
- Flight planning
- IATA airline code
- IATA airport code
- IATA delay codes
- IATA Operational Safety Audit (IOSA)
- International Association of Travel Agents Network (IATAN)
- International Civil Aviation Organization (ICAO)
- International Society of Transport Aircraft Trading
- Kenneth Beaumont
- Standard Schedules Information Manual
