= Babo Airfield =

Former WWII airfield in Indonesia

- West Papua, Indonesia
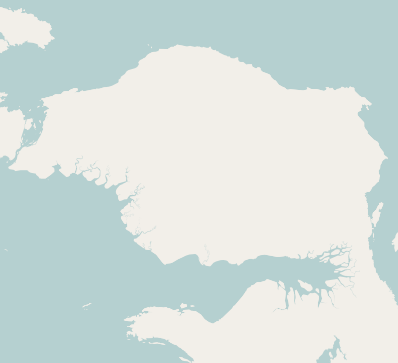
- Location in Bird's Head Peninsula Location in West Papua

Site information
- Type: Military Airfield

Location
- Coordinates: 02°32′59″S 133°25′00″E

Babo Airfield is a disused airfield located on the southern shore of Maccluer Gulf at Babo in Indonesia. The airfield is located in an isolated low-lying swamp area.

== History ==
The airfield was built by the Dutch in the late 1920s or 1930s. It was the final stop for KLM airlines in Dutch New Guinea. After the Pacific War with Japan broke out in December 1941, a Royal Australian Air Force engineering party with the assistance of the Dutch upgraded the airstrip for military use.

First attacked by Japanese H6K Mavis flying boats on December 30, 1941, leaving 3 dead and 14 wounded, including a number of children. Three RAAF No. 13 Squadron Lockheed Hudson bombers were sent there to act as 'fighters', this temporary duty was regarded to be against enemy flying boats while the Dutch KNIL garrison of approximately 200 rushed to improve area defenses and create a clearing for a second runway. The Japanese 2nd Detachment landed at Babo on April 2, 1942 and occupied the town. Most of the Dutch soldiers escaped to Australia.

The airfield was developed into a major base used by both the Imperial Japanese Army and Navy units in the Vogelkop Peninsula, staging to other airfields to the south Aru and Kai Islands or east to New Guinea. The Japanese built a second 'hardtop' runway creating two strips of 4,530' and 2,660' respectively. Naval troops constructed 15 bomber and 24 fighter revetments with more under construction. The base largely escaped any Allied bombing until mid-1943.

The aerial units based at Babo opposed the American landings at Biak, but suffered heavy losses. The army's 24th Sentai lost 20 pilots and 40 planes while based at Babo in only 30 days then was withdrawn. The navy's 202nd Kōkūtai was temporarily withdrawn from Babo for defense of Truk, then returned to Babo in June 1944. They lost 12 planes defending Biak, and were then disbanded.

By mid-1944, the base was in range of medium bombers and ground attack planes from the United States Army Air Forces 5th Air Force, and came under heavy attack. It was neutralized from the air around October 1944, but never liberated by Allied forces. Tons of American and Australian bombs hit the airfield. Many of its aircraft were destroyed by parafrag bombs. Japanese ground crews even sawed off the engines from wrecked planes, in a desperate attempt to ward off further attacks, and used hulks to fill in bomb craters. Isolated from resupply or rescue, the remaining Japanese occupied the area until the end of the war.
