= Aircraft on ground =

Aircraft unavailable due to unplanned maintenance events

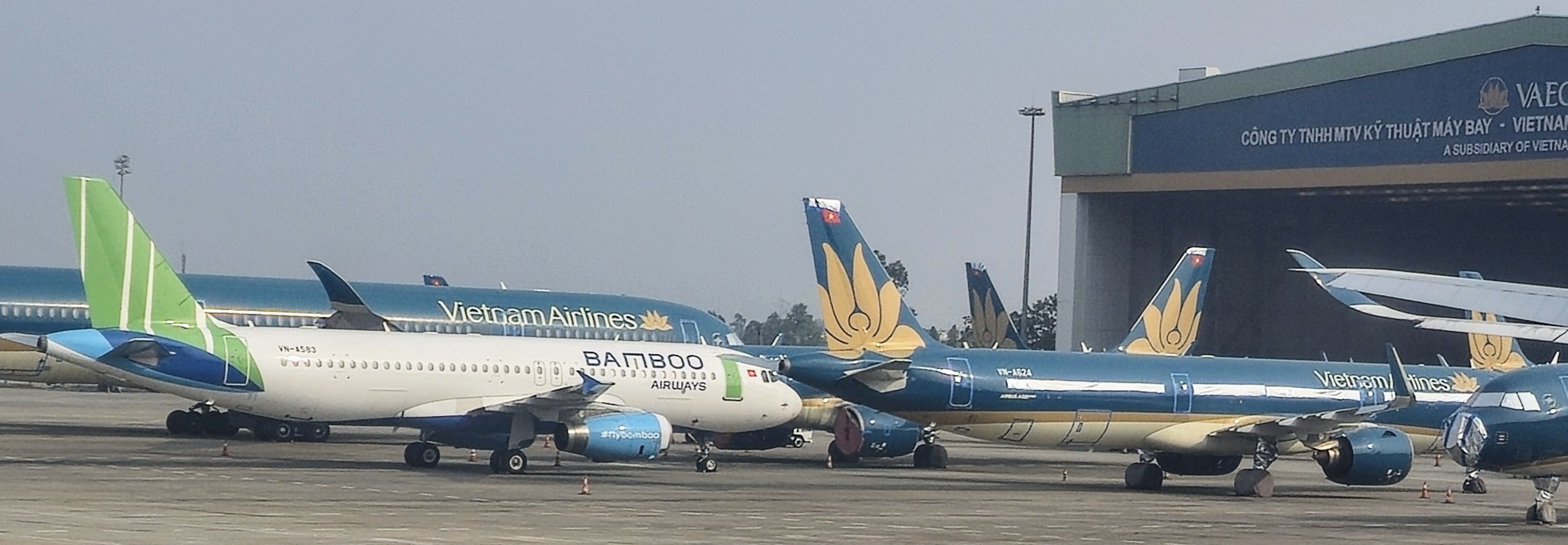
A group of Airbus aircraft being sealed for long-term grounding at Noi Bai International Airport. Most of them are grounded due to technical issues and are not planned to be withdrawn permanently from the airline's nominal fleet.

Aircraft On Ground or AOG is a universally recognized acronym used within airlines and aircraft operators to indicate that an aircraft is temporarily unairworthy (unable to continue in-service due to technical, maintenance or engineering failures). The term AOG is one of the most serious and costly types of disruptions as it can potentially ground an aircraft for an extended period until maintenance is completed. An AOG can be triggered by a defect as simple as an inoperative light bulb or as complex as a damaged engine or airframe structure which requires replacement. Boeing estimates that a 1-2 hour AOG situation can cost $10,000 to $20,000 and possibly even as high as $150,000 per hour depending on such variables as the type of aircraft and route flown. Due to the largely unscheduled nature of AOG's and the likelihood that they often occur in unfavorable locations which lack either inventory, capabilities or facilities, the events can easily lead to significant financial losses.
