= Yokosuka K5Y =

Japanese trainer aircraft

K5Y
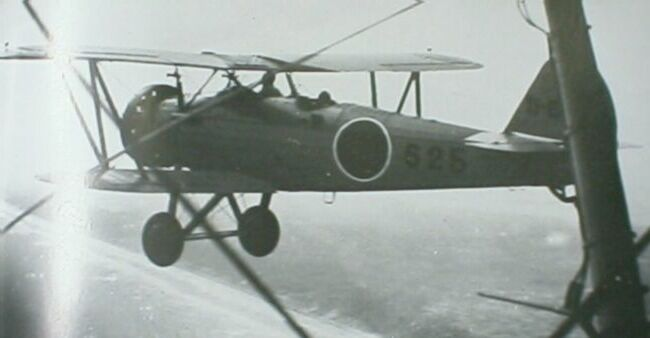
- K5Y1

General information
- Type: Intermediate trainer
- Manufacturer: Various, see text
- Primary users: Imperial Japanese Navy Air Service Indonesian Air Force
- Number built: 5,770

History
- Manufactured: 1934-1945
- Introduction date: 1934
- First flight: 1933

The Yokosuka K5Y (九三式中間練習機, Kyūsanshikichūkanrenshūki; Type 93 Intermediate Training Aircraft) was a twin-seat unequal-span biplane trainer aircraft designed by the Japanese aviation manufacturer Kawanishi Aircraft Company and the Yokosuka Naval Air Technical Arsenal. It was flown by the Imperial Japanese Navy (IJN) during World War II. Due to its bright orange paint scheme (applied to all Japanese military trainers for visibility), it earned the nickname "aka-tombo" or "red dragonfly", after a type of insect common throughout Japan. Its Allied reporting name was Willow.

Developed during the early 1930s, the K5Y was based on the Navy Type 91 Intermediate Trainer, but was subject to a redesign by Kawanishi. First flown in December 1933, the fixed landing gear K5Y1 entered service during the following year. Floatplane types K5Y2 and K5Y3 were also produced. Due to high demand for the type, no less than eight manufacturers were actively producing the type throughout its production run. More K5Ys were produced than any other Japanese trainer aircraft, despite the availability of newer monoplane counterparts, production of the type was maintained throughout the Pacific War through to the Surrender of Japan.

The K5Y was the mainstay of Imperial Japanese Navy Air Service's flight training, and, as intermediate trainers, they were capable of performing demanding aerobatic manoeuvres. The type was used extensively during the Pacific War. During the closing months of the conflict, numerous K5Ys were expended conducting kamikaze missions. The destroyer USS Callaghan sunk on 28 July 1945 after a K5Y performed a kamikaze attack upon the warship.

== Design and development ==
Development of the Yokosuka K5Y can be traced back to 1932 and an instruction from the Imperial Japanese Navy (IJN) issued to the Kawanishi Aircraft Company to proceed with development of an improved model of the Navy Type 91 Intermediate Trainer that had been prototyped by the Yokosuka Naval Air Technical Arsenal during 1931. Designated K5Y1, the aircraft was redesigned in several key areas; its upper wing featured increased dihedral and sweep as well as being positioned closer to the fuselage, while the tail surfaces were also reprofiled. The resulting configuration was a sesquiplane, furnished with fixed landing gear and powered by a single Hitachi Amakaze 11 nine-cylinder radial engine paired with a Townend ring and a twin-bladed wooden propeller. The pilot and instructor were seated in tandem in open cockpits. Provisions were made for the fitting of a single forward-firing 7.7 mm Type 89 machine gun and a flexibly-mounted rear-facing 7.7 mm Type 92 machine gun along with the carriage of either a pair of 30 kg, or up to ten 10 kg, bombs.

In December 1933, the first prototype performed its maiden flight. A compressed flight test programme proceeded, permitting quantity production of the Navy Type 93 Intermediate Trainer to be commence only one month later after receiving IJN acceptance. Despite being heavily involved in the design process, Kawanishi only produced the initial sixty aircraft. Thereafter, production was continued by several other manufacturers, including Watanabe (556 aircraft built), Mitsubishi (60), Hitachi (1,393), First Naval Air Technical Arsenal (75), Nakajima (24), Nippon (2,733), and Fuji (896) - for a total of 5,770 aircraft completed by the end of the type's production run in 1945. Two further land-based versions, the K5Y4 with a 358 kW (480 hp) Amakaze 21A engine and the K5Y5 with a 384 kW (515 hp) Amakaze 15, were projected, but ultimately remained unbuilt.

Towards the end of the Battle of Okinawa, Japan started using the K5Y to conduct kamikaze attacks upon Allied forces. As a consequence of their construction, being largely composed of wood and fabric, the aircraft proved to be somewhat difficult to detect on radar, while their construction, including the lack of fuel tanks within the wings, made it unexpectedly less vulnerable to anti-aircraft fire than typical aircraft. One K5Y, of the Kamikaze Special Attack Corps 3rd Ryuko Squadron, was credited with sinking the destroyer USS Callaghan on 28 July 1945, which was the last US warship lost to a kamikaze attack during the conflict.

== Variants ==
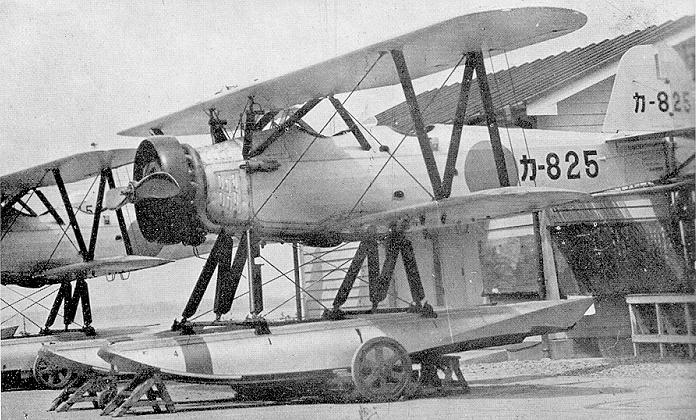
K5Y2

K5Y1

- Two-seat intermediate trainer for the Imperial Japanese Navy.

K5Y2

- Floatplane version, with Amakaze 11 engine.

K5Y3

- Floatplane, with 384 kW (515 hp) Amakaze 21.

K5Y4

- Projected land-based version with 358 kW (480 hp) Amakaze 21A. Never built.

K5Y5

- Projected land-based version with 384 kW (515 hp) Amakaze 15. Never built.

== Operators ==
Empire of Japan

- Imperial Japanese Navy
  - Imperial Japanese Navy Air Service
  - Aircraft carrier
    - Shin'yō, supplied from 931st Kōkūtai.
    - Un'yō, supplied from 931st Kōkūtai.

=== Postwar ===
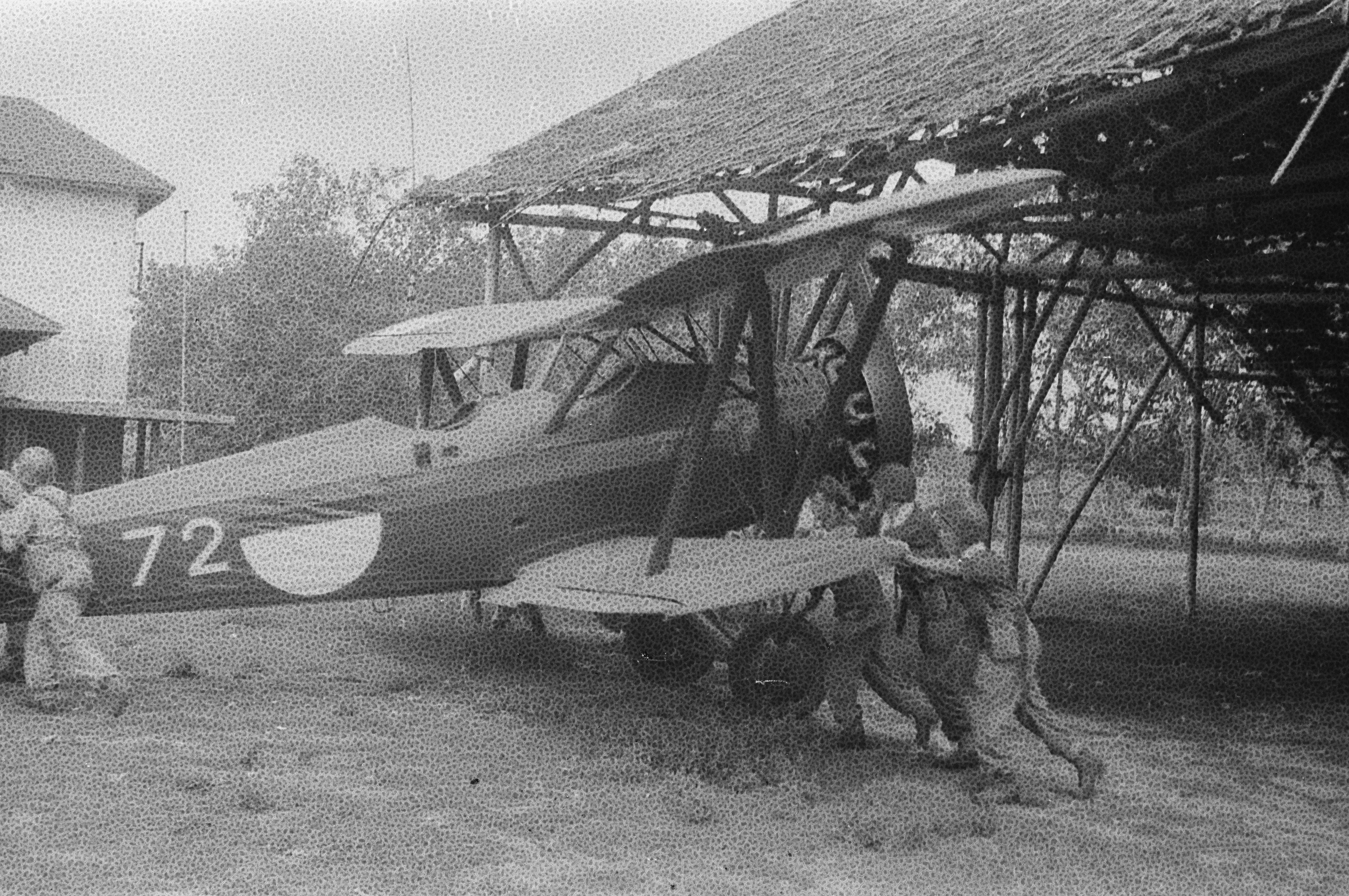
Dutch forces captured an Indonesian K5Y1 in Yogyakarta, 19 December 1948

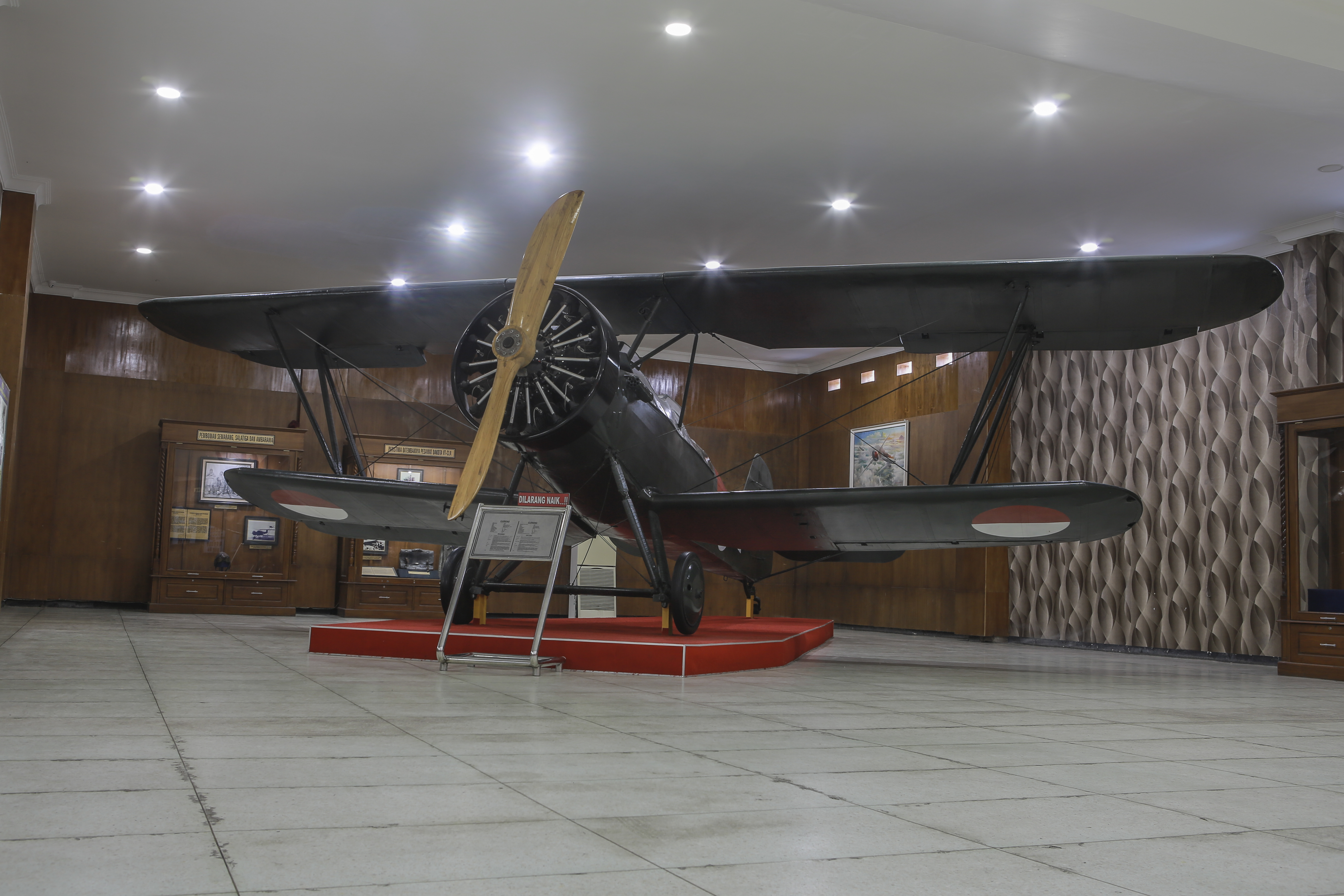
A Yokosuka K5Y, named "Chureng," at the Dirgantara Mandala Museum, Indonesia

Indonesia

- Indonesian People's Security Agency and later Indonesian Air Force operated derelict aircraft against Dutch colonial rule. On 29 July 1947, the Indonesians using 2 units of Yokosuka K5Y (Called "Cureng/Churen" by Indonesian fighters) with one "Guntei Bomber" (Mitsubishi Ki-51) from Maguwo Air Force Base, Yogyakarta for bombing Dutch strategic positions in Ambarawa, Salatiga and Semarang. On its original plan, Nakajima Ki-43 "Hayabusa" also planned to be involved too in this operation, but cancelled as the aircraft suffered technical difficulties. It is currently on display at Yogyakarta (Dirgantara Mandala Museum).

== Specifications (K5Y2 floatplane) ==
Data from Japanese Aircraft of the Pacific War

General characteristics

- Crew: 2
- Length: 8.78 m (28 ft 10 in)
- Wingspan: 11 m (36 ft 1 in)
- Height: 3.68 m (12 ft 1 in)
- Wing area: 27.7 m^{2} (298 sq ft)
- Empty weight: 1,130 kg (2,491 lb)
- Gross weight: 1,650 kg (3,638 lb)
- Powerplant: 1 × Hitachi Amakaze 11 nine-cylinder air-cooled radial piston engine, 250 kW (340 hp) for take-off, 220 kW (300 hp) normal at sea level
- Propellers: 2-bladed wooden fixed-pitch propeller

Performance

- Maximum speed: 200 km/h (120 mph, 110 kn) at sea level
- Cruise speed: 139 km/h (86 mph, 75 kn) at 1,000 m (3,300 ft)
- Range: 702 km (436 mi, 379 nmi)
- Service ceiling: 4,330 m (14,210 ft)
- Time to altitude: 3,000 m (9,800 ft) in 19 minutes and 35 seconds
- Wing loading: 59.6 kg/m^{2} (12.2 lb/sq ft)
- Power/mass: 0.155 kW/kg (0.094 hp/lb)

Armament

- Guns: 1× fixed, forward-firing 7.7 mm (.303 in) Type 97 aircraft machine gun and 1× flexible, rearward-firing 7.7 mm (.303 in) Type 92 machine gun
- Bombs: Up to 100 kg (220 lb) of bombs on external racks

== See also ==
Aircraft of comparable role, configuration, and era

- Arado Ar 66
- Avro 626
- Breda Ba.25
