= Type 100 machine gun =

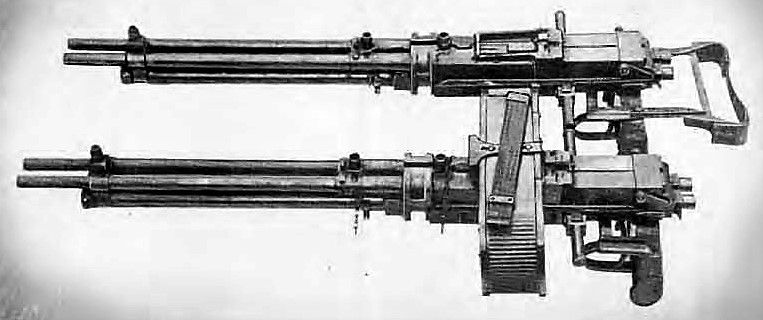
- Type: Machine gun
- Place of origin: Japan

Service history
- Wars: World War II

Production history
- Variants: Type 100; Type 1

Specifications
- Mass: 16 kg (35 lb)
- Length: 95 cm (37 in)
- Barrel length: 62 cm (24 in)
- Cartridge: 7.92×57mm Mauser
- Barrels: 2
- Action: Gas
- Rate of fire: 400-600rpm
- Effective firing range: 250 to 350 meters
- Feed system: 100 rounds Magazine, saddle-drum type
- Sights: Iron

The Type 100 is a double barrel machine gun of Japanese origin. The weapon is gas operated and fed from an overhead magazine. An example can be seen at the Satria Mandala Museum in Jakarta.

== Overview ==
The Type 100 and Type 1 weapons offer the advantage of two guns being mounted in the space occupied by one gun of the same size, thus saving weight in the gun and mount, and space in the plane. A small ammunition supply making frequent magazine loading necessary was a disadvantage, partially because of the advantages of the double barrel principle. This doubling concept is also used for the Japanese Type 89 machine gun and the German MG 81Z machine gun.

The operation for both barrels is housed in a single receiver. This is a single forging, milled to house the two separate actions. The magazine opening is cut out of the top of the receiver, the ejection slot out of the bottom. Each action has its own back plate. The gas piston group action is based on ZB vz. 26 design. The bolt is a steel forging well machined. The gas cylinder tube is constructed of seamless steel tubing and is threaded to the receiver at the rear. The trigger assembly is made up of two separate sear assemblies riveted to the pistol grip framework. Two pistol grips are located about 6 inches (20 cm) apart, the sears are connected to a horizontal trigger bar mounting a trigger on either end. Both guns may be fired by depressing either trigger. The magazine is the saddle-drum magazine type. Each side holds 50 rounds and feeds one gun. Each side has its own spring so that, in the event of a jam affecting one barrel, the other gun may continue to fire.

The Type 1 variant appears to be basically the same weapon as the earlier model, the Type 100. The Type 1 gun had a head or shoulder rest attached to the gun. This is not the same Type 1 machine gun as used by the Imperial Japanese Navy, which was a variant of the German MG 15 machine gun.

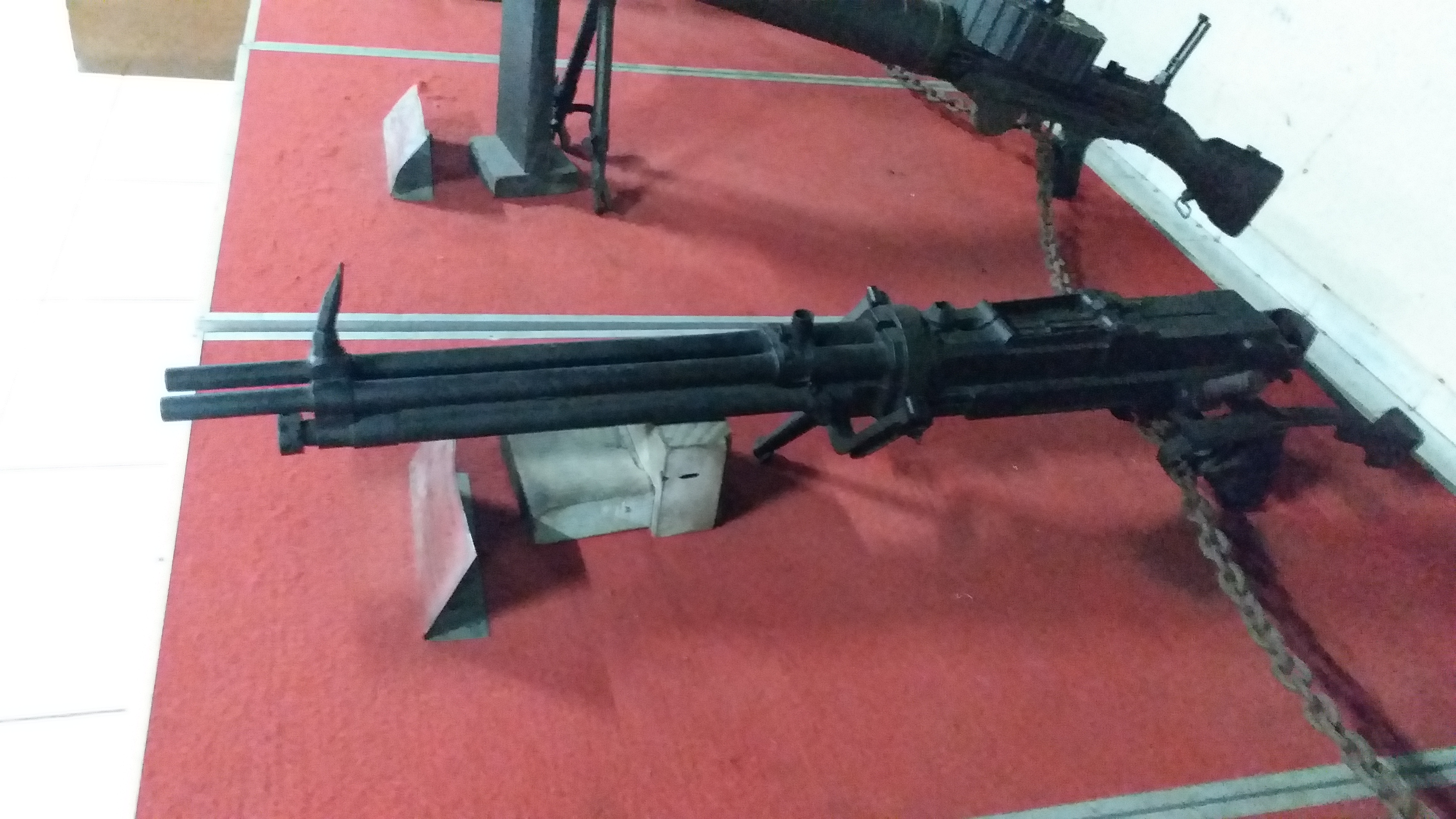
A Type 100 gun displayed at Satriamandala Museum, Indonesia, 2023
