= Nakajima B5N =

Japanese attack aircraft family

B5N
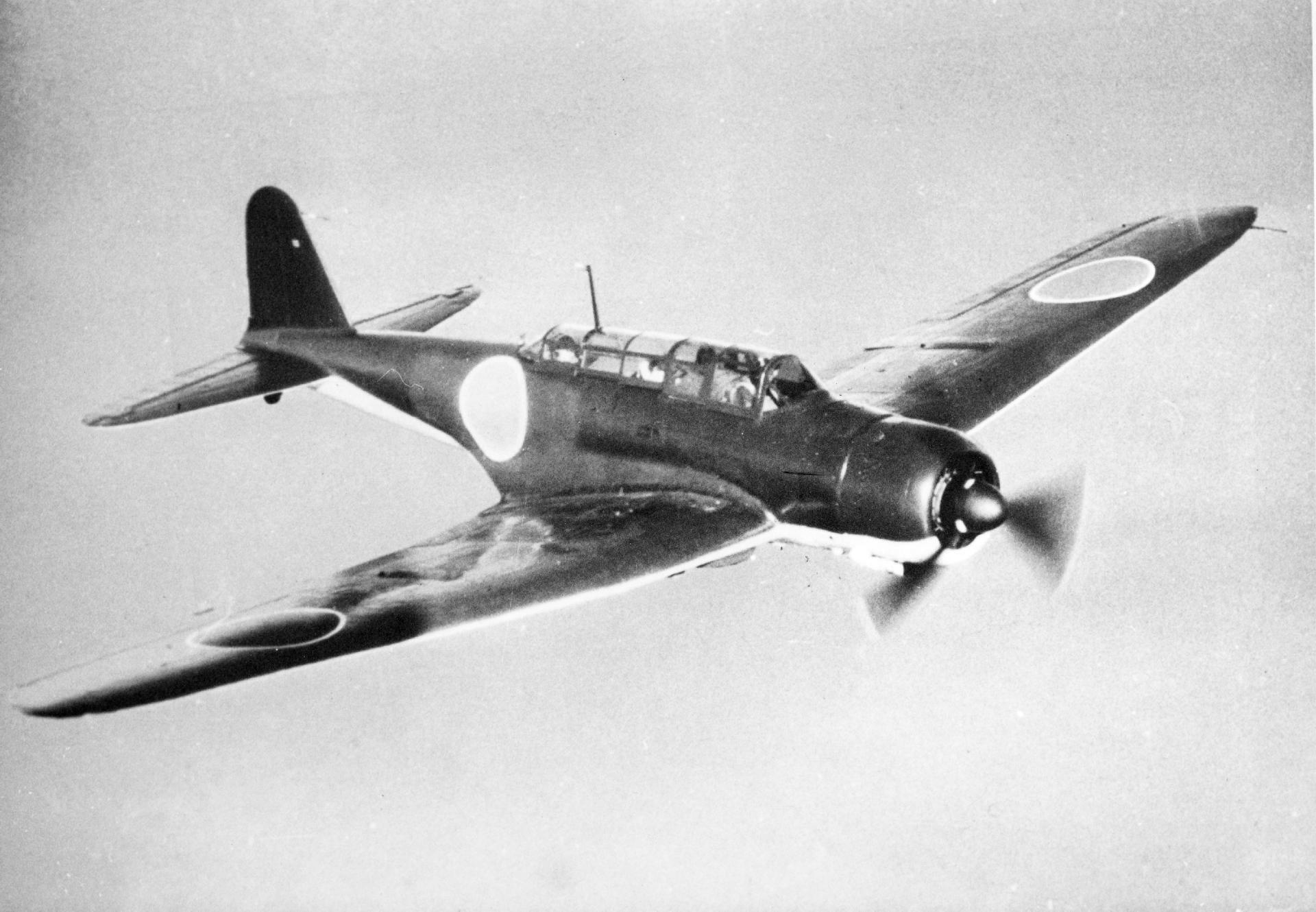
- A Nakajima B5N2 in flight

General information
- Type: Carrier-based torpedo bomber/high-level bomber
- National origin: Japan
- Manufacturer: Nakajima Aircraft Company
- Status: Retired
- Primary user: Imperial Japanese Navy Air Service
- Number built: 1,149

History
- First flight: January 1937
- Retired: 1945
- Developed into: Nakajima B6N Tenzan

The Nakajima B5N (Allied reporting name "Kate") was a carrier-based torpedo bomber designed and produced by the Nakajima Aircraft Company. Operated by the Imperial Japanese Navy Air Service (IJNAS) during the Pacific War, it was the standard torpedo bomber of the service throughout much of the conflict. It also served as a high level bomber.

Developed to fulfil the 10-Shi specification of 1935, which sought a carrier attack bomber possessing similar performance to the Mitsubishi A5M fighter aircraft, the B5N was initially internally designated as the Type K. It had a relatively clean low-mounted monoplane configuration and featured a retractable undercarriage, a folding wing, Fowler flaps and a variable-pitch propeller. The first prototype made its maiden flight in January 1937; it outperformed the Mitsubishi B5M during competitive trials and won the production contract, leading to the B5N's service introduction as the Type 97 Carrier Attack Bomber in 1938. That same year, the B5N1 made its combat debut during the Second Sino-Japanese War, in which the aircraft was typically used as a level bomber. Further refinement of the design during the late 1930s led to the development of the faster B5N2.

According to the aviation historian René J. Francillon, the B5N2 was the most modern aircraft of its type to be operated by any of the naval service in the world at the start of the Pacific War. In early engagements, the B5N proved to be substantially faster and more capable than several of its Allied counterparts, including the American Douglas TBD Devastator monoplane, and the British Fairey Swordfish and Fairey Albacore torpedo biplanes. The B5N operated throughout the entire conflict, although this was partially due to the delayed development of a successor aircraft. In the early part of the Pacific campaign, when flown by well-trained IJN aircrews and as part of well-coordinated attacks, the B5N achieved particular successes at the battles of Pearl Harbor, Coral Sea, Midway, and Santa Cruz Islands.

In 1944, the B5N was displaced from front-line service by the newer Nakajima B6N Tenzan (which was derived from the B5N) and relegated to secondary duties, including training, target towing, and anti-submarine warfare. Several aircraft were equipped with early radars and magnetic anomaly detectors. Heavy losses were incurred in the bomber role during Japan's unsuccessful defense of the Philippines in October 1944. In the closing months of the conflict, most remaining B5Ns were expended in kamikaze attacks. Following the Surrender of Japan, the type was withdrawn from service.

== Design and development ==
The origins of the Nakajima B5N can be traced back to 1932 and the issuing of the 7-Shi specification by the Imperial Japanese Navy (IJN) that sought a new carrier-based attack bomber. While multiple manufacturers, including the Nakajima Aircraft Company, produced prototypes of their designs to fulfil this specification, none were deemed to be satisfactory. The revised 9-Shi specification was issued, calling for a replacement to the obsolete Kugisho B3Y biplane. While the Yokosuka B4Y biplane fulfilled the accompanying specification and was procured, officials considered to only be an interim measure and that a more capable aircraft would be subsequently procured, which would possess performance comparable to that of the Mitsubishi A5M carrier-based fighter aircraft.

Accordingly, in 1935, the 10-Shi specification was issued. Amongst the stipulated performance criteria, the span was required to be less than 16 meters, provision to fold the wing to reduce the span to no greater than 7.5 meters, the ability to carry one 800 kg torpedo or equivalent bomb load along with at least one 7.7 mm machine gun, a maximum speed of no less than 180 kt at 2,000 m, at least four hours of endurance at no less than 135 kt, accommodate a crew of three, and to be powered by either the Nakajima Hikari or Mitsubishi Kinsei radial engines. Nakajima opted to produce a response; its design team was headed by Katsuji Nakamura.

Internally designated Type K by Nakajima, the basic configuration of the aircraft was a relatively clean low-mounted monoplane that was furnished with a hydraulically-actuated retractable undercarriage. It featured all-metal construction with the exception of the fabric-covered flight control surfaces. The aircraft's sizable wing could be folded upwards; the hinges were positioned so that the wingtips could overlap each other to fold above the cockpit. The fuselage was intentionally compact, possessing an overall length of 10.3 m to enable it to use the IJN's standard deck elevators. Several innovative features were present in the Type K's design, including the use of Fowler flaps and a variable-pitch propeller.

In December 1936, the first prototype was completed, powered by a Nakajima Hikari 2 radial, and performed its maiden flight one month later. Early flight testing revealed troubles with the aircraft's hydraulics, but these were quickly resolved. The prototype attained a maximum speed of 230 mph, considerably in excess of the specification. Some IJN officials were concerned that the aircraft's inclusion of several innovative feature would result in it being very challenging to maintain; in response, the second prototype was equipped with a manual wing-folding mechanism in place of the hydraulic counterpart while conventional flaps were fitted instead of Fowler flaps; a Hikari 2 radial driving a constant speed propeller along with larger integral wing tanks were also fitted.

The second prototype participated in competitive trials against the rival submission, the Mitsubishi B5M; in November 1937, Nakajima's design was selected as the victor, being ordered into production shortly thereafter and being assigned the service designation Type 97 Carrier Attack Bomber (九七式艦上攻撃機) (kyū-nana-shiki kanjō kōgeki-ki or kankō for short). In addition to Nakajima, the B5N was also produced by both Aichi Kokuki and Dai-Jūichi Kaigun Kōkū-shō.

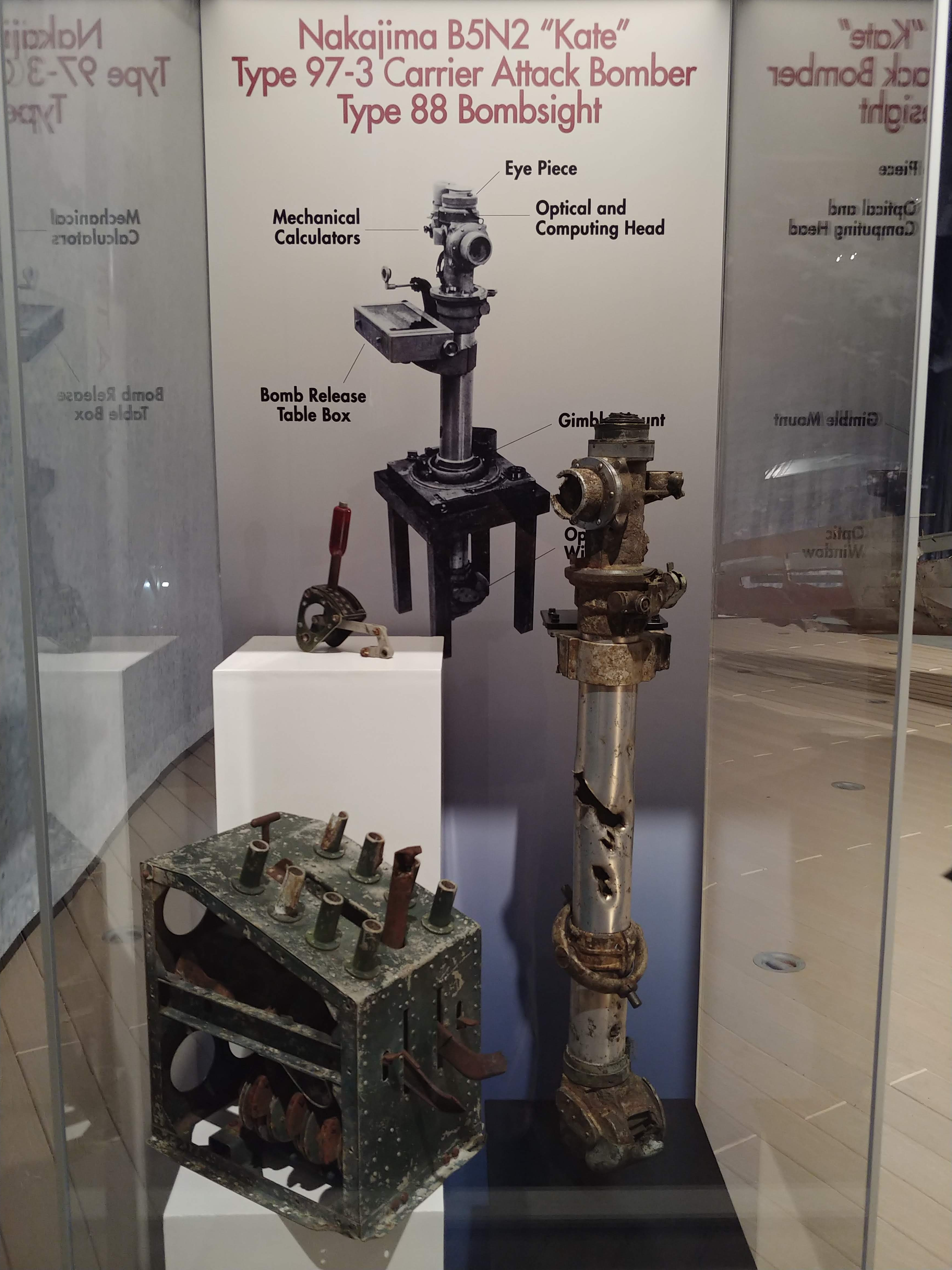
Type 88 bombsight, torpedo release lever, and manual bomb release from a Nakajima B5N2 "Kate" at the Pearl Harbor Aviation Museum

On operational B5Ns, the navigator/bombardier/observer position was equipped with a Type 90 bombsight, which was a long vertical tube located in the front-left of the seat. There was also a Type 3 reflector compass for precise navigation that was mounted on the top of the cockpit frame. The radio-operator/gunner position was equipped with one of the standard-issue radio sets for navy three-seater aircraft (Type 96 Mk3 earlier and Type 2 Mk3 later) that was mounted in front of the radio-operator/gunner's seat and behind the navigator/bombardier/observer's seat.

The radio-operator/gunner also operated one flexible 7.7 mm (.303 in) Type 92 machine gun at the rear end of the cockpit. One Type 91 torpedo could be mounted on the racks that were fixed eccentrically to the right at the bottom of the fuselage. Alternatively, racks could be replaced to carry either one 800 kg bomb (e.g., Type 99 No 80 armor-piercing bomb) or two 250 kg bombs (e.g., Type 98 No 25 land bomb) or six 60 kg bombs (e.g., Type 2 No 6 land bomb). Replacing the racks and exchanging between the torpedo and bombs was not a trivial process and could take more than two hours to complete.

Initially, most of the B5N bombers were painted in silver, which was the color used throughout the early stages of the Second Sino-Japanese War. The color scheme eventually changed to dark green before the start of the Pacific War.

While the type had performed well during the Second Sino-Japanese War, several weaknesses had become apparent in the original B5N1 production model. These were mainly concerned with the lack of protection that the design offered its crew and its fuel tanks. Keen to maintain the high performance of the type, the IJN was reluctant to add weight in the form of armor, and instead looked to obtaining a faster version of the aircraft in the hopes of outrunning enemy fighters. The B5N2 was outfitted with a considerably more powerful engine - Nakajima's own Sakae Model 11, 14-cylinder twin-row radial, as used in the initial models of the Mitsubishi A6M fighter – and various modifications were made to streamline it. Despite these changes, its top speed was not significantly higher, however, the Sakae engine proved to be more reliable than the Hikari engine, which was appreciated by IJN officials as reducing avoidable airframe losses over water. Accordingly, while some of its weaknesses remained unremedied, this version replaced the B5N1 in production and service from 1939.

== Operational history ==
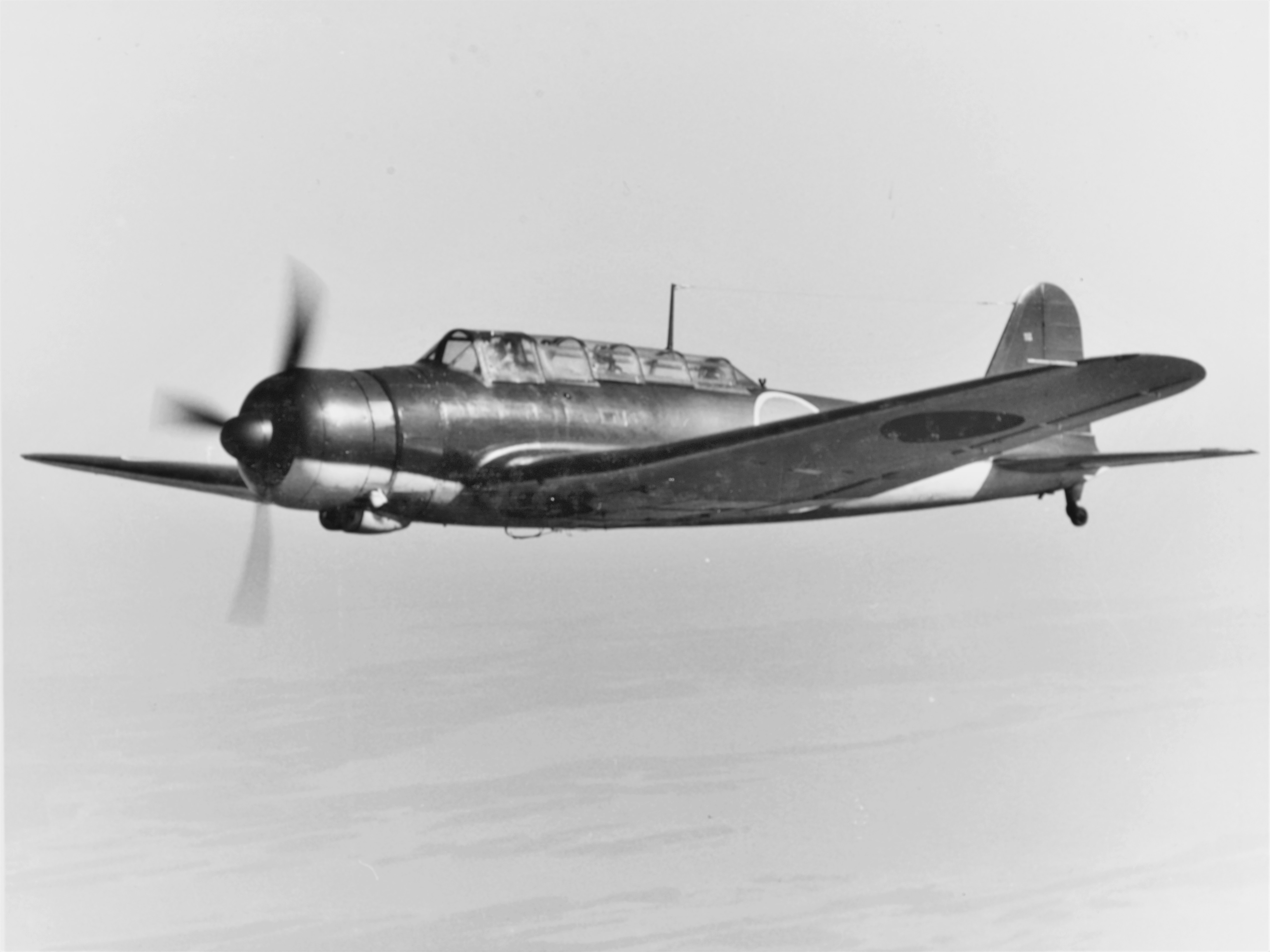
A captured Nakajima B5N2 "Kate" being flown over Maryland, 1943

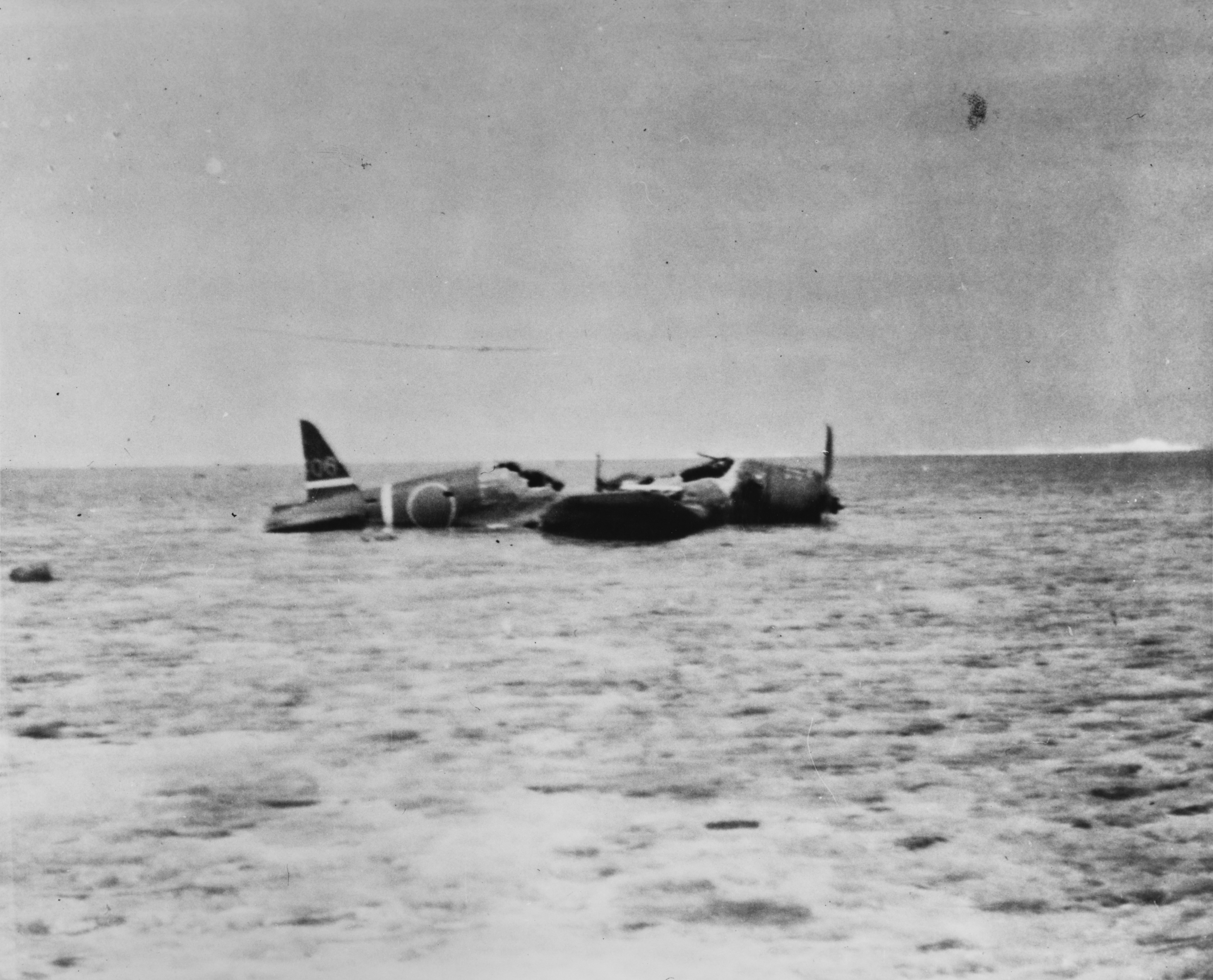
A crashed Nakajima B5N2 "Kate" (tail marking "EI-306") from Shōkaku

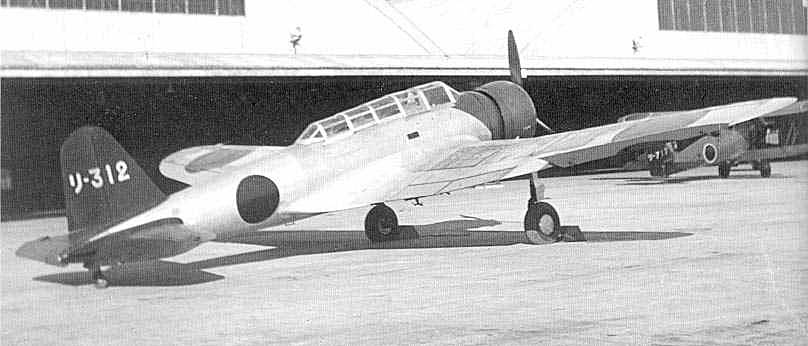
A B5N1 "Kate" parked in front of a hangar

The B5N was primarily employed as a carrier-based aircraft and occasionally as a land-based bomber. It carried a crew of three: pilot, navigator/bombardier/observer, and radio-operator/gunner. As with other IJN multi-seat aircraft, an individual bomber was commanded by the senior ranking crew member aboard, which could be the observer rather than the pilot.

The initial model, B5N1, made its combat debut during the Second Sino-Japanese War in 1938. In this theatre, it was typically operated from land bases and was armed with bombs to perform tactical bombing missions in support of Japanese forces on the ground. Despite lacking protection for either its crew or fuel tanks while featuring relatively light defensive armament, it proved to be quite successful in China. No major modifications were needed to suit operations, although some changes to internal apparatus such as the radio set were enacted. Despite this, the B5N1 model was almost entirely phased out of frontline service by the start of the Pacific War.

The type played a major role in the Attack on Pearl Harbor at the start of the conflict; 144 B5N2s were involved in the attack. One aircraft carried Mitsuo Fuchida, the commander of the attack. One high-level bomber from the carrier Hiryū was credited with sinking the American battleship Arizona. The B5N2s were recorded as sinking several other battleships, including West Virginia, California, Oklahoma and Utah. Five torpedo bombers were shot down in the first wave.

Further high-profile attacks performed by B5Ns included their role in the sinking of the United States Navy aircraft carrier Lexington at the Battle of the Coral Sea and the aircraft carrier Hornet at the Battle of the Santa Cruz Islands, and the disabling of the aircraft carrier Yorktown at the Battle of Midway, later sunk by the Japanese submarine I-168. During a typical attack on an enemy carrier, the B5Ns would coordinate with Aichi D3A dive bombers; ideally, these dive bombers would help to suppress the ship's anti-aircraft fire, which improved the chances of success for the slower-flying torpedo bombers. During the Battle of the Eastern Solomons, the IJN tried to minimize losses to its torpedo bombers and initially sent only the dive bombers to attack and cripple US carriers for the subsequent torpedo strike, this tactic proved to be unsuccessful, as the torpedo bombers did not launch until the battle was already over.

During the conflict, a typical amphibious attack by Japanese forces would be supported by numerous B5Ns, operating either from carriers or land bases.

The B5N served as the basis for a follow-on design, the Nakajima B6N Tenzan, which eventually replaced it in front-line service during 1944, by which point the B5N was considered to be obsolete. Despite this, the type continued to fly in secondary roles, such as training, target towing, and anti-submarine warfare, which the type proved to be well suited to. Some of the aircraft used for this latter purpose were equipped with early radars and magnetic anomaly detectors. They were typically deployed to provide air cover against Allied submarines in locations that were unlikely to result in encounters with Allied fighters.

B5Ns were also used as bombers during Japan's unsuccessful defense of the Philippines in October 1944, suffering severe losses. Late on in the conflict, many of the remaining operational aircraft were expended performing kamikaze attacks.

== Variants ==
- Type K

Prototype.

- B5N1

First production model.

- B5N1-K

Many B5N1s were converted into advanced training aircraft.

- B5N2

Improved version fitted with Sakae 11 engine.

== Operators ==
Japan

- Imperial Japanese Navy

== Surviving aircraft ==
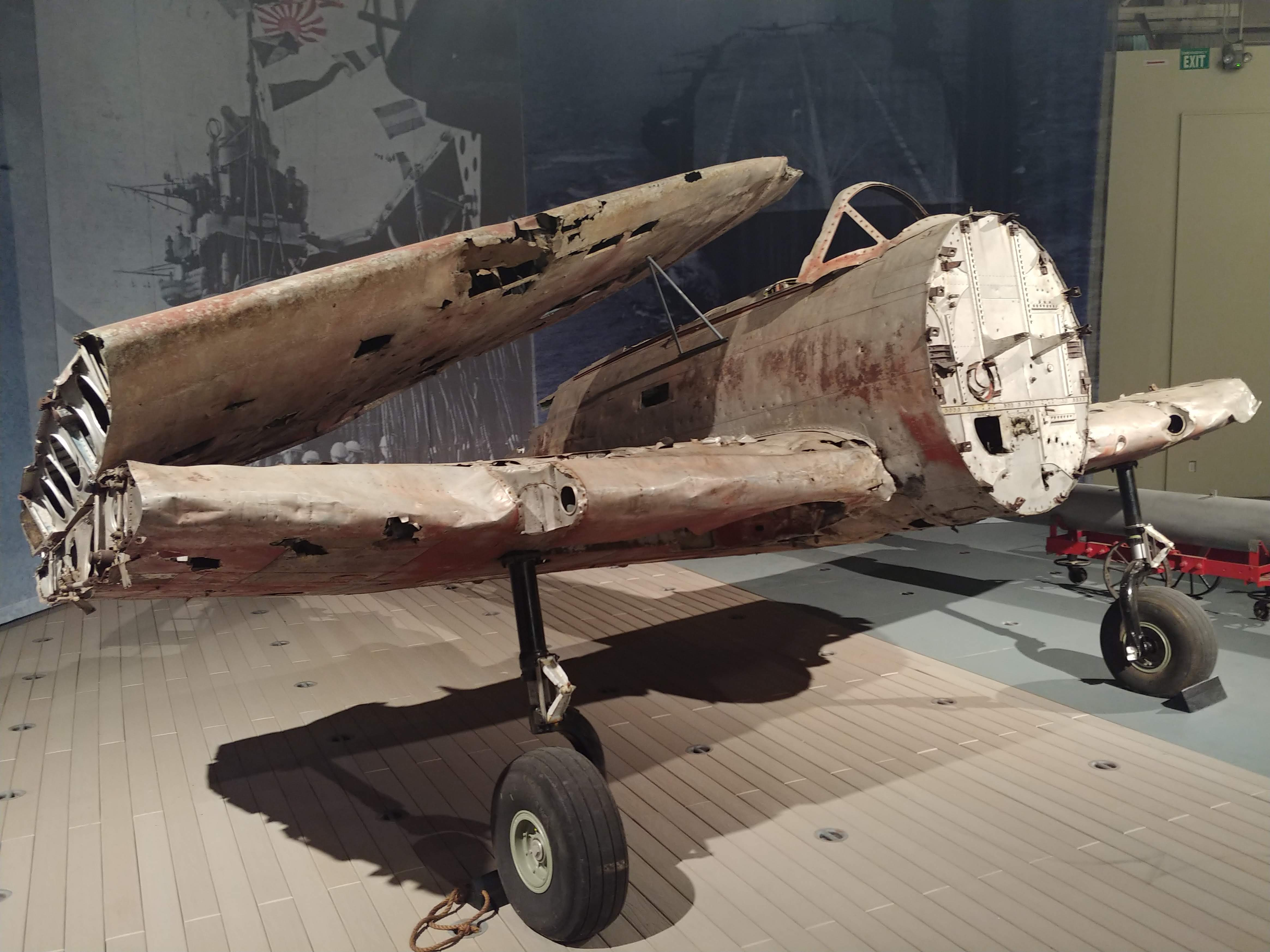
Nakajima B5N2 "Kate" reconstruction at the Pearl Harbor Aviation Museum in 2019. The original Hinomaru is still visible on the starboard wing underside.

None of the 1,150 production B5Ns survived World War II intact. Only two partially-recovered B5Ns are known to exist, neither of them airworthy.

Replicas of the B5N2s were made using stretched fuselages from U.S. Canadian Car and Foundry "Harvard" - a variant of the North American T-6 Texan trainers, which were modified to represent Japanese aircraft for the movie Tora! Tora! Tora!, and have been used in a number of movies and airshows since to depict the aircraft.

One recovered B5N2 is at the Wings Museum in Balcombe, West Sussex, UK. This large portion was recovered from the Kuril Islands by a British private collector in 2003.

A B5N was unveiled at the Pacific Aviation Museum in Honolulu, Hawaii on 18 April 2016.

== Specifications (Nakajima B5N2) ==
Nakajima B5N1

Data from Japanese Aircraft of the Pacific War

General characteristics

- Crew: 3
- Length: 10.3 m (33 ft 10 in)
- Wingspan: 15.518 m (50 ft 11 in)
- Height: 3.7 m (12 ft 2 in)
- Wing area: 37.7 m^{2} (406 sq ft)
- Airfoil: root: NN-5 mod (16%); tip: NN-5 mod (8%)
- Empty weight: 2,279 kg (5,024 lb)
- Gross weight: 3,800 kg (8,378 lb)
- Max takeoff weight: 4,100 kg (9,039 lb)
- Powerplant: 1 × Nakajima Sakae 11 14-cylinder air-cooled radial piston engine, 750 kW (1,000 hp) for take-off

720 kW (970 hp) at 3,000 m (9,800 ft)

- Propellers: 3-bladed constant-speed metal propeller

Performance

- Maximum speed: 378 km/h (235 mph, 204 kn) at 3,600 m (11,800 ft)
- Cruise speed: 259 km/h (161 mph, 140 kn) at 3,000 m (9,800 ft)
- Range: 978 km (608 mi, 528 nmi)
- Ferry range: 1,991 km (1,237 mi, 1,075 nmi)
- Service ceiling: 8,260 m (27,100 ft)
- Rate of climb: 6.5 m/s (1,280 ft/min)
- Time to altitude: 3,000 m (9,800 ft) in seven minutes and 40 seconds
- Wing loading: 100.8 kg/m^{2} (20.6 lb/sq ft)
- Power/mass: 0.196 kW/kg (0.119 hp/lb)

Armament

- Guns: 1 × 7.7 mm Type 92 machine gun 'Ru' (Lewis) in rear dorsal position, fed by hand loaded drum magazines of 97 rounds. A number of B5N1s were equipped with 2 × 7.7 Type 97 machine guns in the wings.
- Bombs: 1 × 800 kg (1,760 lb) Type 91 torpedo or 1 × 800 kg (1,760 lb) bomb or 2 × 250 kg (550 lb) bombs or 6 × 60 kg (132 lb) bombs

== See also ==
- Nakajima B6N Tenzan

Aircraft of comparable role, configuration, and era

- Douglas TBD Devastator
- Fairey Barracuda
- Mitsubishi B5M

Related lists

- List of aircraft of World War II
- List of military aircraft of Japan
