= Type 89 machine gun =

7.7mm Type 89 fixed aircraft machine gun
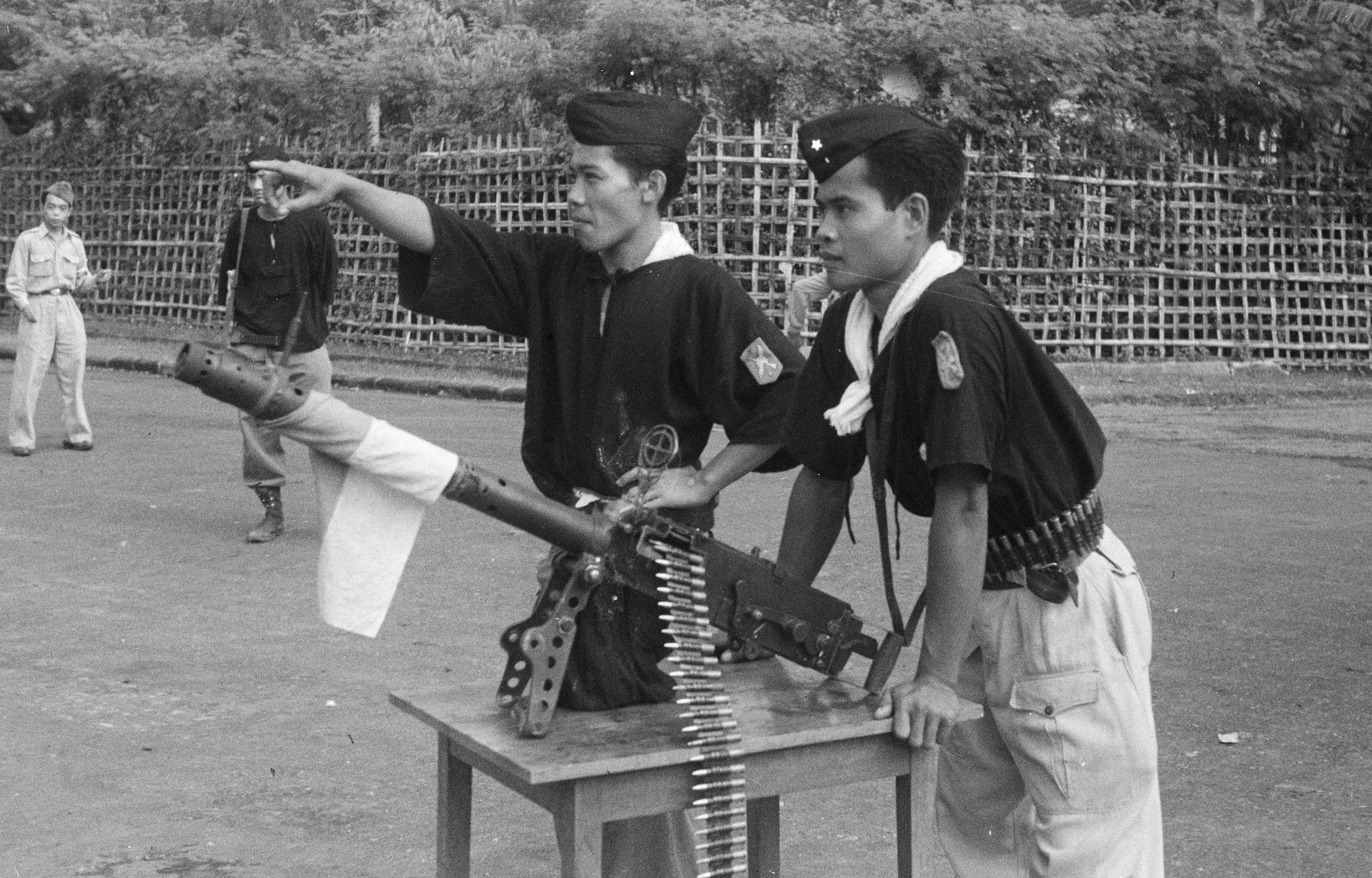
- Indonesian student soldiers with Type 89 adapted for field use during the Indonesian Revolution

Service history
- Used by: Imperial Japanese Army
- Wars: Second Sino-Japanese War; World War II; Indonesian National Revolution; Korean War

Specifications
- Mass: 12.7 kg (28 lb)
- Length: 1,035 mm (40.7 in)
- Barrel length: 600 mm (24 in)
- Cartridge: 7.7x58mmSR Type 89
- Action: Short recoil-operated
- Rate of fire: 700–900 rounds/min
- Muzzle velocity: 820 m/s (2,700 ft/s)
- Feed system: Belt

The Type 89 machine gun refers to two unrelated Imperial Japanese Army aircraft machine guns. Its Imperial Japanese Navy counterparts are the Type 97 machine gun (fixed), and Type 92 machine gun.

== Type 89 fixed ==
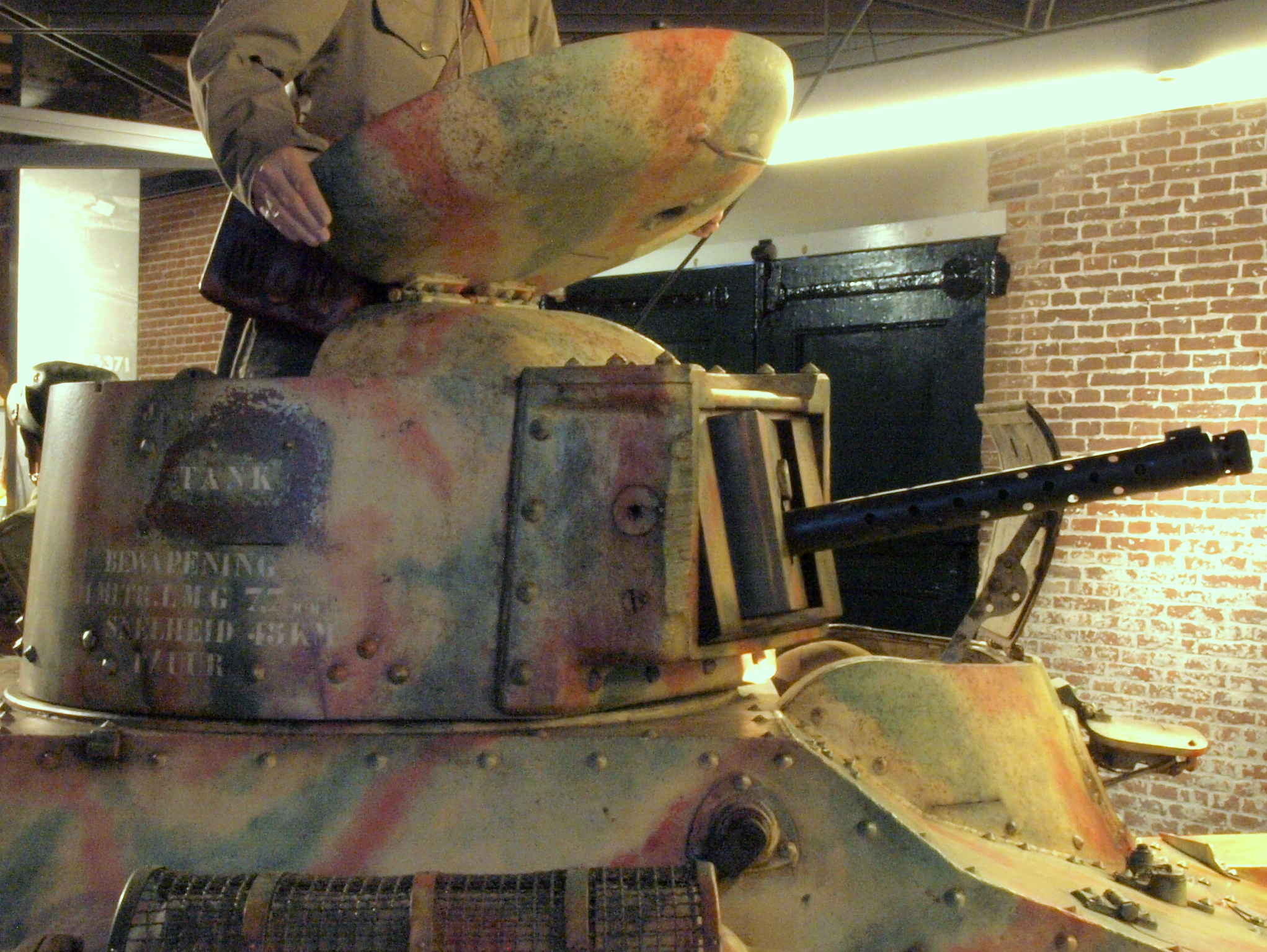
Type 89 mounted on Type 97 Te-Ke tankette

The first machine gun is a recoil-operated, licensed copy of the Vickers Class E machine gun re-chambered to 7.7x58mmSR Type 89 cartridge, it is referred to as the "fixed type". It was used in synchronized applications in fighter cowls and in wing gun applications. It was belt-fed, using a steel link disintegrating belt. The fixed Type 89 was used in the Nakajima Ki-27, Ki-43, early Ki-44 fighters, the Mitsubishi Ki-30 and Ki-51 light bombers, the Kawasaki Ki-32 light bomber and various others. Communist forces used some ex-Japanese Type 89s during the Korean War. Indonesian Republican forces also used them for ground use during the Indonesian National Revolution.

== Type 89 flexible type ==
7.7 mm Type 89 machine gun flexible type
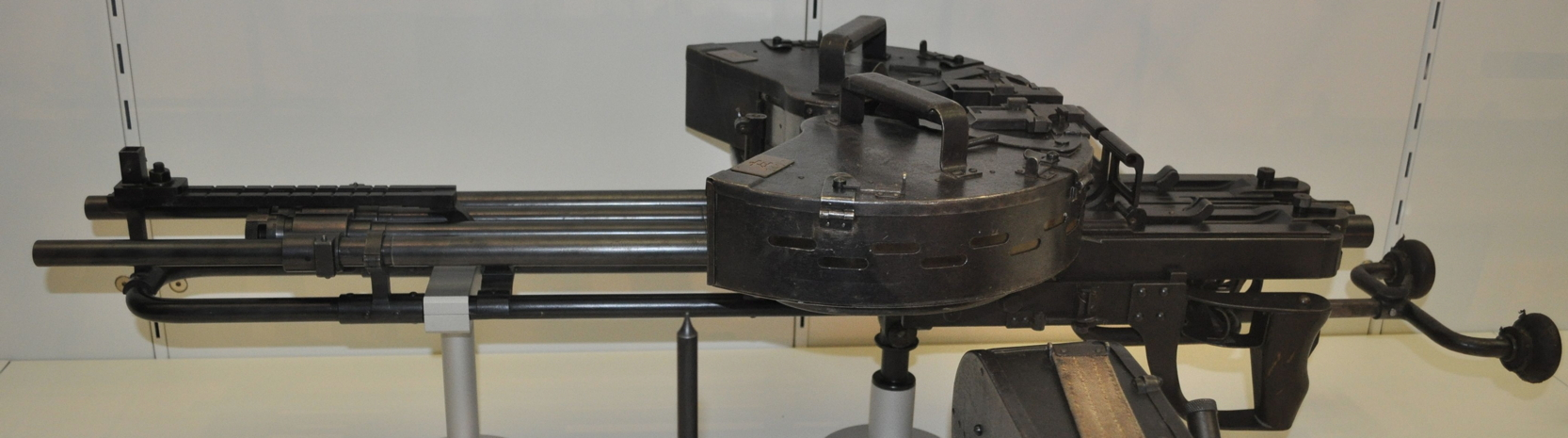
- 7.7 mm Type 89 Dual flexible machine gun
- Place of origin: Empire of Japan

Specifications
- Mass: 28 kg (62 lb) (Type 89 Special); 9.3 kg (21 lb) (Te-4 Machine Gun)
- Length: 1,069 mm (42.1 in)
- Barrel length: 600 mm (24 in)
- Cartridge: 7.7x58mmSR Type 89
- Action: Gas-operated
- Rate of fire: 1,400 rounds/min 670 rounds/min (Te-4 Machine gun)
- Muzzle velocity: 810 m/s (2,700 ft/s)
- Feed system: 2x quadrant-shaped 45-round pan magazines each 69 rounds pan (Te-4 Machine gun)
- Sights: anti-aircraft

The second machine gun is gas-operated, it consists of two modified Type 11 machine guns paired into a single unit, similar to the German MG 81Z. It is commonly referred to as the "flexible type". It was derived from otsu-gou - an experimental machine gun (1922–1929) which was a Type 11 turned on its side and fed from a pan magazine. The machine gun was chambered in the 7.7x58mmSR Type 89 cartridge, it used a Y-shaped metallic stock, spade grips, the barrels had no cooling fins (contrary to Type 11), it was fed from two quadrant-shaped 45-round pan magazines (each magazine has a place for nine 5-round stripper clips). The machine gun was used as a rear gun on aircraft and some were pressed into ground and anti-aircraft use. Single or doubled Type 89s were used in most Imperial Japanese Army aircraft that had flexible defensive weapons, including the Mitsubishi Ki-21, Ki-67 and Nakajima Ki-49 heavy bombers, the Mitsubishi Ki-30, Ki-51 and Kawasaki Ki-32 light bombers, the Tachikawa Ki-9 (for training purposes only), and various other aircraft in the Army Air Force inventory.

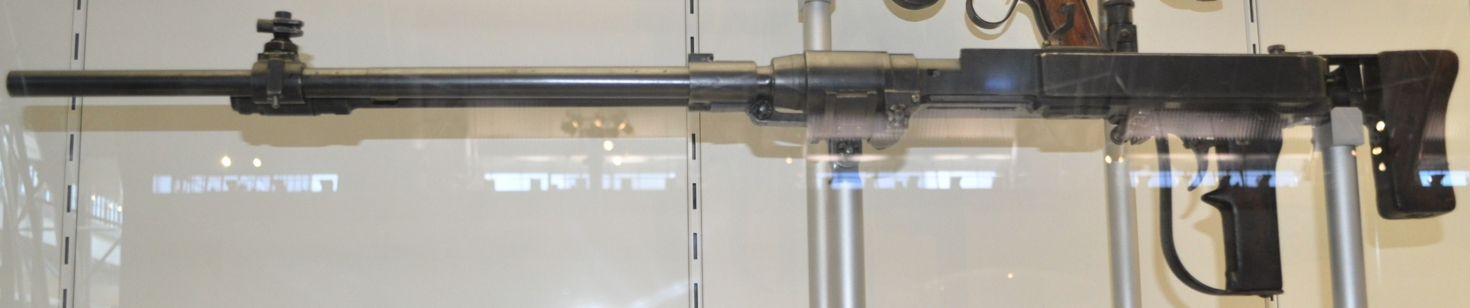
Type 89 "modified single" (Te-4 Machine Gun)

Additionally, there was also the Te-4 machine gun (the Te designation was given to firearms under 11mm, and Ho to larger weapons such as the 12.7mm Ho-103 heavy machine gun and 20mm Ho-5 autocannon), the machine gun bore a strong resemblance to otsu-gou (of which the Type 89 "flexible" was a derivative), due to that fact it was assumed to be a further modification of the double-barrelled machine gun, as such it was referred to as Type 89 "modified single".

== See also ==
- Type 97 machine gun
- Type 92 machine gun
- Type 100 machine gun
