= Mitsubishi Ki-51 =

Japanese light bomber/dive bomber

Ki-51
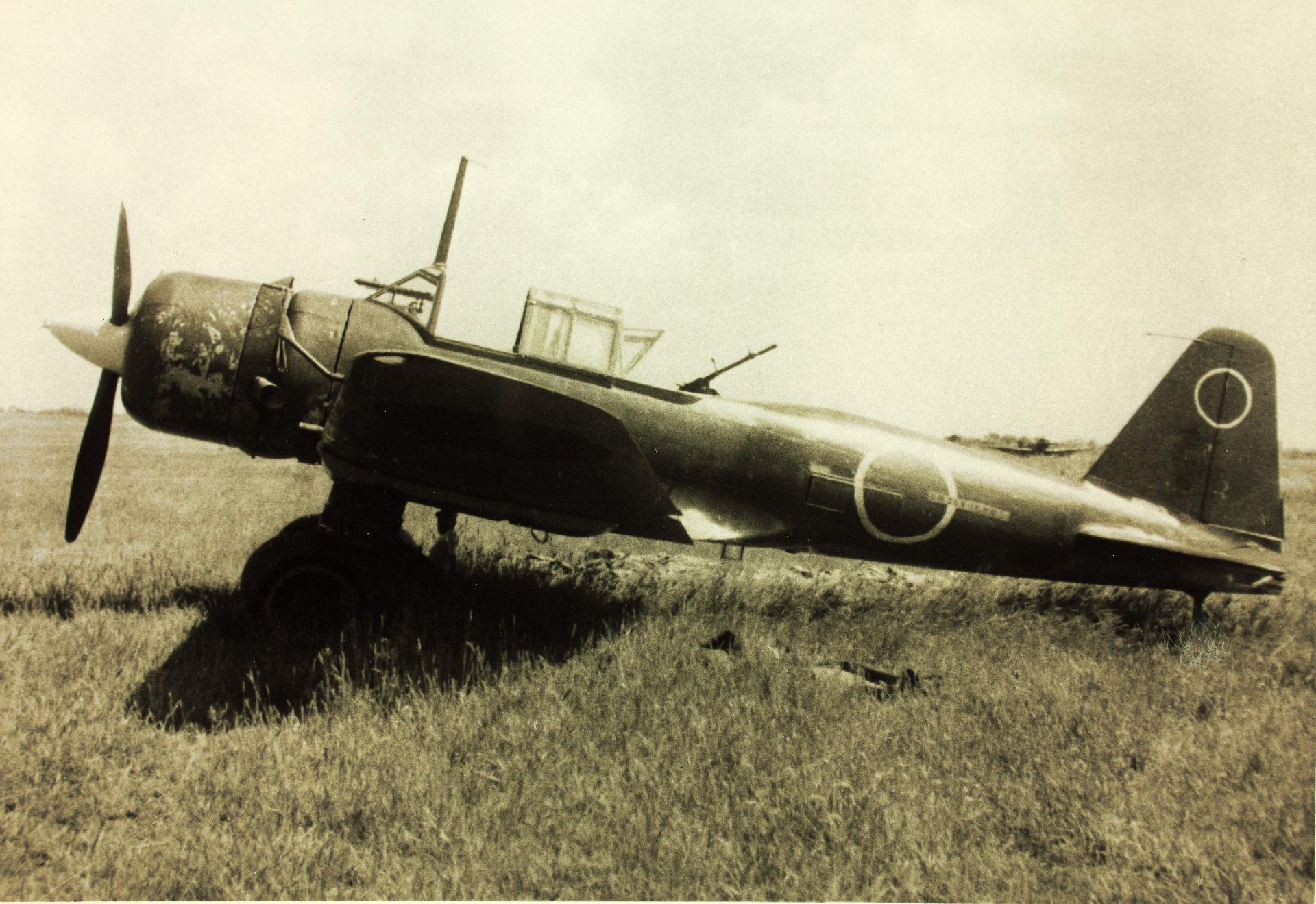
- Mitsubishi Ki-51

General information
- Type: Light bomber/dive bomber
- Manufacturer: Mitsubishi Jukogyo KK
- Primary user: Imperial Japanese Army Air Service
- Number built: 2,385

History
- First flight: mid-1939

The Mitsubishi Ki-51 (Army designation "Type 99 Assault Plane"; Allied reporting name Sonia) is a light bomber/dive bomber in service with the Imperial Japanese Army during World War II. It first flew in mid-1939. Initially deployed against Chinese forces, it proved to be too slow to hold up against the fighter aircraft of the other Allied powers. However, it performed a useful ground-attack role in the China-Burma-India theater, notably from airfields too rough for many other aircraft. As the war drew to a close, the Japanese began using them in kamikaze attacks. Total production was around 2,385.

In 1941, Manchuria Aircraft Company produced a prototype Ki-71, which had its original engine replaced with a Ha-112 and its fixed landing gear changed to retractable ones to improve performance, which was not as good as expected. Thus, the prototype was never put into practical combat use.

The Ki-51 was used from the latter part of the Second Sino-Japanese War through the entire Pacific War and was active in a wide range of locations from mainland China to the southern front (Malay Peninsula, Indonesia, Burma, New Guinea, Philippines, etc.). Positive traits of the Ki-51 included good low-altitude maneuverability, good takeoff and landing performance from rough ground, and good maintainability, making the Ki-51 a highly practical aircraft that could withstand heavy use on the battlefield. In the latter half of the war, losses increased as the basic design was undeniably outdated. When compared to late-war fighters, it had relatively low horsepower and slow speed. Also, like other Japanese Army aircraft, it was a combat aircraft with a relatively mediocre bomb load and armament.

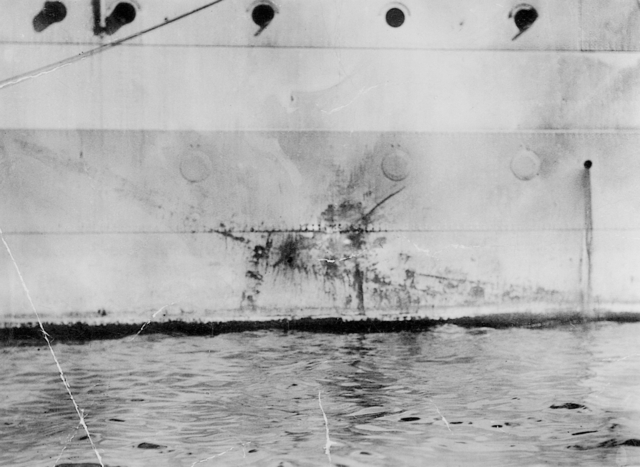
26 July 1945 Imprint of a Japanese Ki-51 kamikaze aircraft on the side of HMS Sussex

Some Ki-51s were modified to carry a 250kg bomb under the fuselage and were used as an antiship attack aircraft or kamikaze aircraft. On the day Hiroshima was destroyed by an atomic bomb, a Ki-51 was responsible for the last Japanese sinking of a U.S. warship, sinking the submarine USS Bullhead with all hands.

== Variants ==
- Prototypes: two built
- Service trials: 11 built
- Ki-51: 2,372 built (Manufacturers: Mitsubishi (1,462), Tachikawa Army Air Arsenal (913)) until March 1944
- Ki-51A: reconnaissance version.
- Ki-51B: assault version with armor and bomb racks to carry 200 kg (441 lb) of bombs. It could also be fitted with an aerial camera.
- Mansyu Ki-71: three prototypes built by Mansyu with retractable landing gear, did not enter production.

== Operators ==
Japan

- Imperial Japanese Army Air Force

Republic of China
China

- Communist Chinese (captured): The last 4 of around 100 Ki-51s were retired in 1953.

France

- French Air Force - At least two Ki-51 was used by French Air Force in Indochina during First Indochina War.

Indonesia

- Indonesian Air Force - In late 1945, the Indonesian People's Security Army captured some aircraft at former Japanese bases, including Bugis Air Base in Malang. Most aircraft were destroyed during the Indonesian National Revolution of 1945–1949. Two Yokosuka K5Y Cureng and a Ki-51 Guntei carried out a bombing operation against the Dutch on 29 July 1947.

Democratic People's Republic of Korea

- Following independence, transferred from the Soviet Union

Republic of Korea

- Used by South Korean Airforce during Korean War

== Surviving aircraft ==
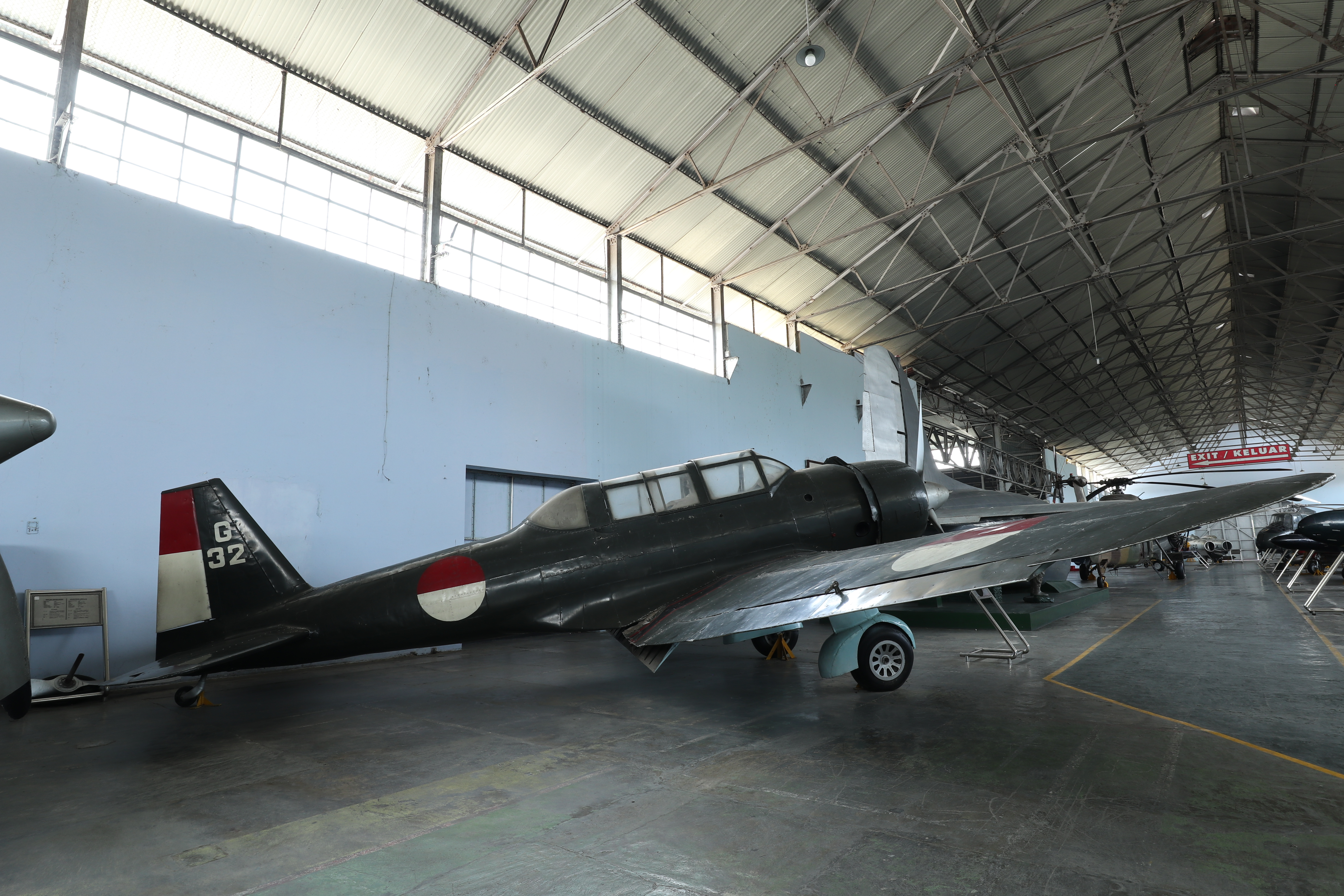
Indonesian Air Force Ki-51 "Guntei" at Dirgantara Mandala Museum

The only complete survivor of Ki-51 is part of the collection of the Dirgantara Mandala Museum in Indonesia. The aircraft was found abandoned at the Babo Airfield in West Papua province. The aircraft was likely stripped for spare parts and later abandoned. Before it was recovered, its propeller blade was cut off, with its engine cowling and cockpit canopy missing. The aircraft, recovered from Babo airfield in 1987, was restored and then displayed with Indonesian Air Force markings at the Dirgantara Mandala Museum.

== Specifications (Ki-51) ==
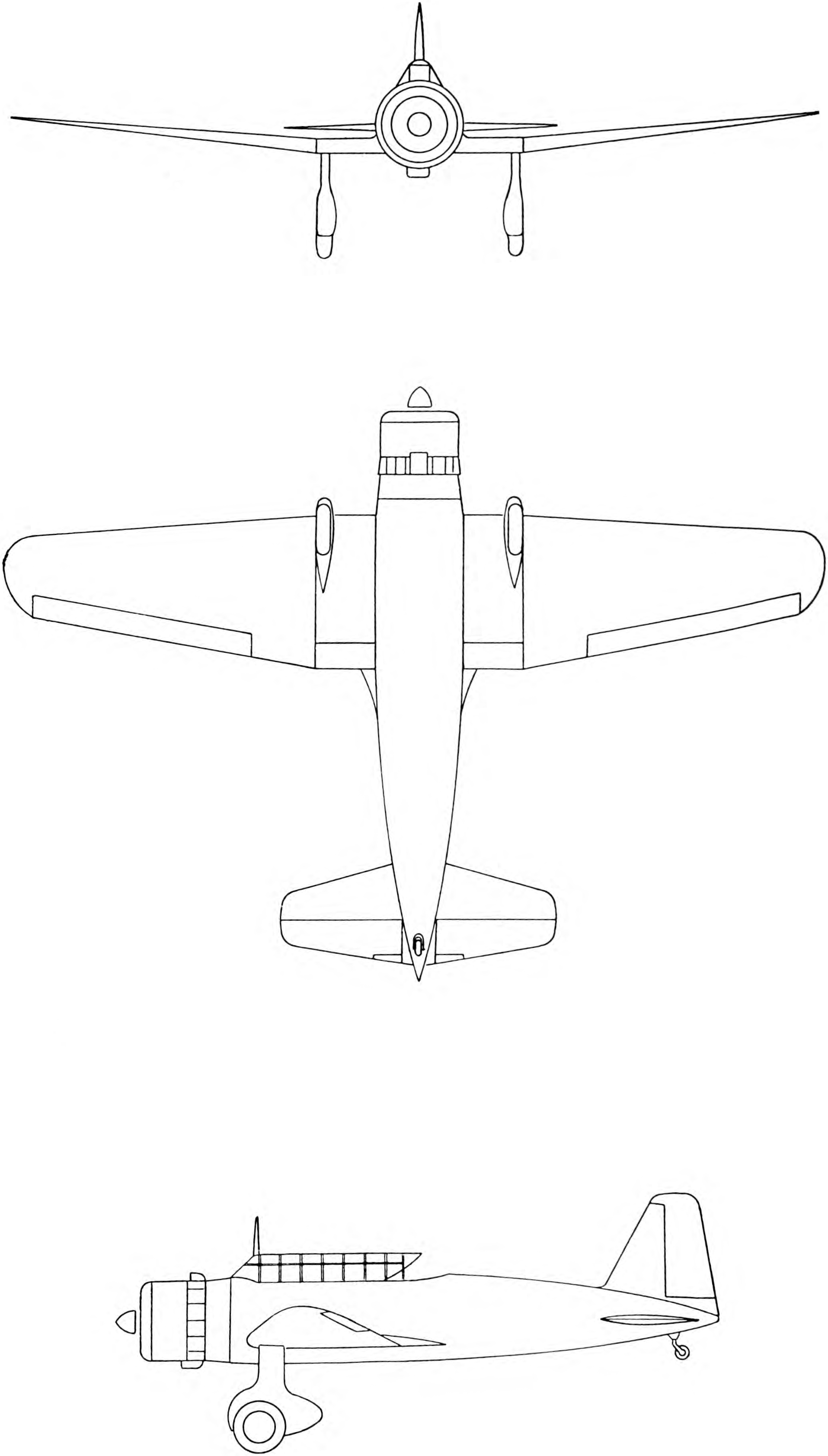
3-view drawing of the Mitsubishi Ki-51

Data from Japanese Aircraft of the Pacific War

General characteristics

- Crew: 2
- Length: 9.21 m (30 ft 3 in)
- Wingspan: 12.1 m (39 ft 8 in)
- Height: 2.73 m (8 ft 11 in)
- Wing area: 24 m^{2} (260 sq ft)
- Empty weight: 1,873 kg (4,129 lb)
- Gross weight: 2,798 kg (6,169 lb)
- Max takeoff weight: 2,920 kg (6,437 lb)
- Powerplant: 1 × Mitsubishi Ha-26-II 14-cylinder air-cooled radial piston engine, 710 kW (950 hp)
- Propellers: 3-bladed variable-pitch propeller

Performance

- Maximum speed: 424 km/h (263 mph, 229 kn) at 3,000 m (9,800 ft)
- Range: 1,060 km (660 mi, 570 nmi)
- Service ceiling: 8,270 m (27,130 ft)
- Time to altitude: 5,000 m (16,000 ft) in 9 minutes 55 seconds
- Wing loading: 117 kg/m^{2} (24 lb/sq ft)
- Power/mass: 0.24 kW/kg (0.15 hp/lb)

Armament

- Guns:
  - 2 × fixed, forward-firing 7.7 mm (.303 in) Type 89 machine guns (replaced with 2 × 12.7 mm (.5 in) Ho-103 machine guns in later models)
  - 1 × 7.7 mm (.303 in) Te-4 Machine gun rearward-firing machine gun.
- Bombs: 200 kg (440 lb) bombs (normal operations); 250 kg (550 lb) for suicide operations

== See also ==
Aircraft of comparable role, configuration, and era

- Aichi D3A
- Douglas SBD Dauntless
- Ilyushin Il-2
- Junkers Ju 87D
- Kawasaki Ki-32
- Mitsubishi Ki-30

Related lists

- List of military aircraft of Japan

== Bibliography ==
- Francillon, René J. (1979). Japanese aircraft of the Pacific War. London: Putnam. ISBN 0-370-30251-6. OCLC 6124909. (new edition 1987 by Putnam Aeronautical Books, ISBN 0-85177-801-1.)
- Green, William & Swanborough, Gordon (n.d.). "Pentagon Over the Islands: The Thirty-Year History of Indonesian Military Aviation". Air Enthusiast Quarterly (2): 154–162. ISSN 0143-5450.
- Soumille, Jean-Claude (September 1999). "Les avions japonais aux couleurs françaises" [Japanese Aircraft in French Colors]. Avions: Toute l'Aéronautique et Son Histoire (in French) (78): 6–17. ISSN 1243-8650.
