= Type 97 aircraft machine gun =

Japanese WWII light machine gun

Navy Type 97 7.7 mm fixed aircraft machine gun
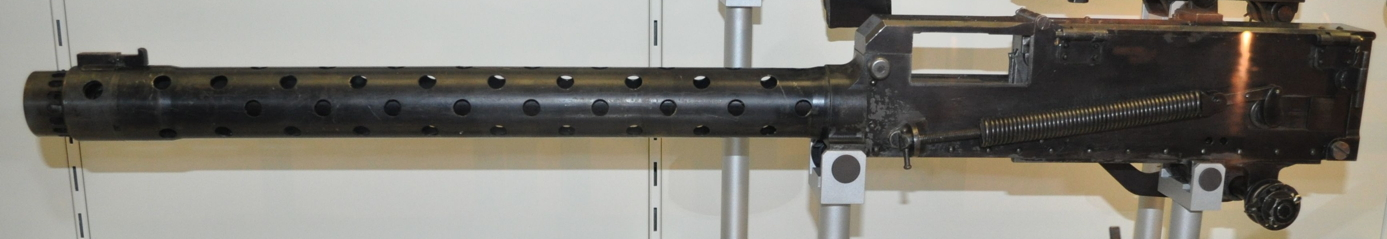
- A Navy Type 97 fixed aircraft machine gun
- Type: Light machine gun
- Place of origin: Empire of Japan

Service history
- In service: 1937–1945
- Used by: Imperial Japanese Navy
- Wars: Second Sino-Japanese War, World War II

Production history
- Designed: 1937
- Manufacturer: KK Nihon Seikoujo; Suzuka Naval Arsenal; Toyokawa Naval Arsenal
- Produced: 1937–1945

Specifications
- Mass: 12.6 kg (28 lb)
- Length: 1,033 mm (40.7 in)
- Barrel length: 600 mm (24 in)
- Cartridge: 7.7x56mmR
- Cartridge weight: 6.9 g (106 gr) projectile weight
- Action: Short recoil toggle locked
- Rate of fire: 900 RPM; 600–700 RPM (synchronized)
- Muzzle velocity: 745 m/s (2,444 ft/s)
- Effective firing range: 600 m (2,000 ft)
- Feed system: Belt
- References: The WWII Fighter Gun Debate: Gun Tables

The Type 97 aircraft machine gun (九七式七粍七固定機銃) was the standard fixed light machine gun on aircraft of the Imperial Japanese Navy during World War II. This weapon was not related to the Type 97 heavy tank machine gun used by the Imperial Japanese Army in armored vehicles, or the Type 97 automatic cannon used as an anti-tank rifle.

== Design ==
The 'Navy Type 97 aircraft machine gun' was similar to the 'Army Type 89 machine gun', being a licensed copy of the Vickers Class E machine gun. It was highly suitable for synchronization and was used as the cowling armament on the A6M Zero. However, the Type 97 remained chambered for the British 0.303 in (7.7 mm) cartridge and the Type 89 was chambered for a new 0.303 in (7.7 mm) cartridge developed in Japan, making their ammunition non-interchangeable.

== Deployment ==
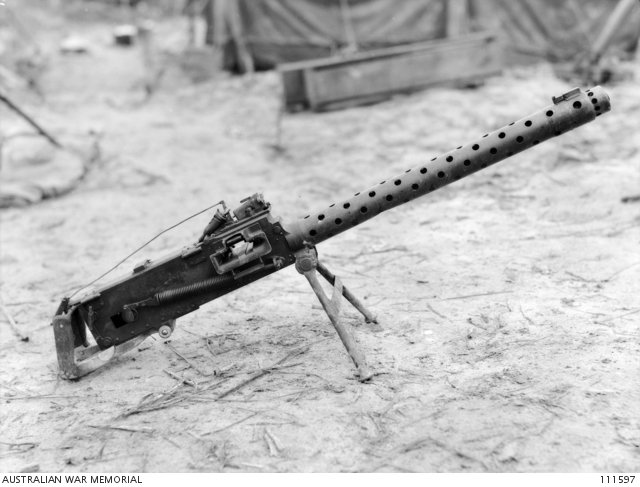
Type 97 with bipod and spade grips for field use, captured by Australian troops in Balikpapan, July 1945

The Type 97 came into service in 1937, and was used in the Nakajima B6N, Yokosuka K5Y, Yokosuka D4Y, Aichi D3A, Aichi E16A, Kawanishi E7K, Kawanishi N1K and its land-based derivative, the N1K-J, Mitsubishi J2M, Mitsubishi F1M2, in addition to the Mitsubishi A6M Zero and its floatplane derivative, the Nakajima A6M2-N. The Type 97 also has been used by the ground troops with modification by adding bipod and spade grip. Indonesian Republican forces used ex-Japanese Type 97s for ground use during the Indonesian National Revolution.

== See also ==
- Type 89 machine gun
- Type 92 machine gun
- Type 100 machine gun
