= Type 97 machine gun =

Type 97 machine gun may refer to:

- Type 97 heavy tank machine gun, a machine gun employed by the Imperial Japanese Army on their tanks and armored vehicles.
- Type 97 aircraft machine gun, a machine gun used by the Imperial Japanese Navy on their aircraft.
