= USS Callaghan (DD-792) =

Fletcher-class destroyer

Coordinates: 25°43′N 126°55′E

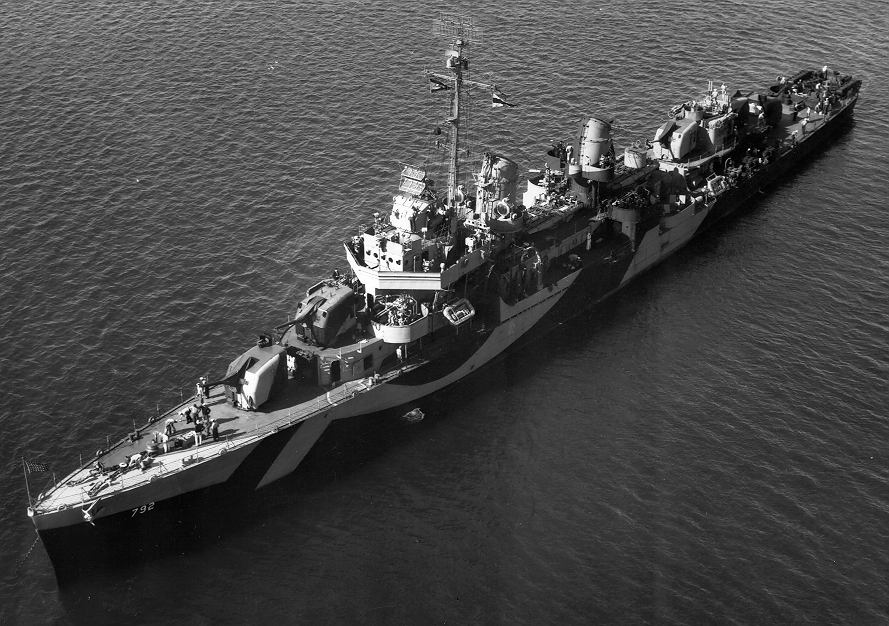
- USS Callaghan (DD-792)

History

United States
- Namesake: Daniel J. Callaghan
- Builder: Bethlehem Shipbuilding, San Pedro, Los Angeles
- Laid down: 21 February 1943
- Launched: 1 August 1943
- Commissioned: 27 November 1943
- Fate: Sunk by Yokosuka K5Y kamikazes off Okinawa, 28 July 1945

General characteristics
- Class & type: Fletcher-class destroyer
- Displacement: 2,050 tons
- Length: 376.4 ft (114.7 m)
- Beam: 39.6 ft (12.1 m)
- Draft: 13.8 ft (4.2 m)
- Propulsion: 60,000 SHP (45 MW); 2 propellers
- Speed: 38 knots (70 km/h; 44 mph)
- Range: 6,500 nmi (12,000 km) at 15 knot
- Complement: 329
- Armament: 5 × 5 in (130 mm)/38 guns, 10 × 40 mm AA guns, 7 × 20 mm AA guns, 10 × 21 inch (533 mm) torpedo tubes

USS Callaghan (DD-792), a Fletcher-class destroyer, was a ship of the United States Navy named for Rear Admiral Daniel J. Callaghan (1890–1942), who was killed in action in the Naval Battle of Guadalcanal and posthumously awarded the Medal of Honor for heroism during the action.

Callaghan was launched 1 August 1943 by Bethlehem Shipbuilding, San Pedro, Calif.; sponsored by Mrs. D. J. Callaghan; commissioned 27 November 1943 and reported to the Pacific Fleet.

== Service history ==
Callaghan sailed from the West Coast 5 February 1944 to join the 5th Fleet in defending against air raids on the Palaus, Yap, Ulithi, and Woleai from 30 March to 1 April. Based on Manus in April, Callaghan supported the Hollandia operation as picket ship during air strikes and screening the valuable tankers.

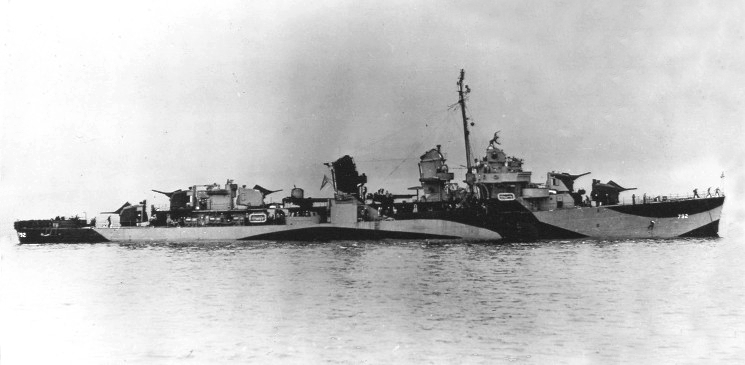
Callaghan underway

From June to August 1944, Callaghan provided screen for escort carriers softening up, and later supporting the invasions of Saipan, Tinian, and Guam. At Saipan, Callaghan's guns joined in driving off a heavy Japanese air attack on 17 June, helping shoot down three enemy aircraft. Fanshaw Bay was struck by a bomb in this attack, and Callaghan escorted the crippled escort carrier safely back to Eniwetok. Late in August Callaghan began operations as escort for air strikes on the Palaus, Mindanao, Luzon, and the Central Philippines in support of the invasion of the Palaus, a stepping stone to the Philippines.

With the invasion of the Philippines scheduled for mid-October 1944, Callaghan steamed in the screen of the carrier force conducting essential preliminary neutralization of Japanese airfields in Formosa and Okinawa. During a heavy enemy air attack on 14 October, Callaghan joined in downing several planes. Sailing on to stand guard off the invasion area on Leyte, Callaghan's force contributed air power in the decisive Battle for Leyte Gulf, helping to ensure that the Allied advance in the Philippines against the Japanese efforts to break up the landings. After pursuing the Japanese moving north, Callaghan returned to support the Philippine operations, with the 3rd Fleet, for air strikes on Luzon. En route on 3 November, Reno was torpedoed, and Callaghan stood by to protect the stricken light cruiser until relief forces arrived, when Callaghan was able to rejoin her group for the strikes. Through December, she participated in more air strikes on the Central Philippines, and in January 1945, the destroyer sailed with the 3rd Fleet for air raids on Formosa, Luzon, Indo-China, Hong Kong, and the Nansei Shoto.

Through the following months, Callaghan operated at the same pace, screening carrier strikes shelling Iwo Jima, Okinawa, and the Tokyo area. Callaghan assisted in sinking a Japanese picket boat on 18 February, and on 3 March joined the bombardment of Parece Vela.

In late March 1945, Callaghan joined Task Force 54 (TF 54) at Ulithi, and from this base sailed for the bombardment preceding the invasion of Okinawa, where she made harassing fire ashore during the night of 26 March. This initiated prolonged fire support and screening duty in the dangerous waters off Okinawa during which, in addition to invaluable aid to the troops, Callaghan joined in the sinking of a Japanese midget submarine and shot down three dive bombers.

== Fate ==
Though the Allied forces had taken Okinawa by 21 June, Japanese forces continued to skirmish. On 9 July 1945, Callaghan took station on the radar picket line, where on 28 July she drove off an attacking wood-and-fabric Yokosuka K5Y biplane. The aircraft survived the first approach because the proximity fuses were ineffective against its wooden fuselage. The plane, skimming low and undetected, crashed into Callaghan on the starboard side. It exploded and one of the aircraft's bombs penetrated the aft engine room. The destroyer flooded and the fires which ignited antiaircraft ammunition prevented nearby ships from rendering aid. Callaghan sank at 02:35, 28 July 1945, with the loss of 47 members of her crew. She was the last Allied ship sunk by a kamikaze attack during the war.

== Awards ==
Callaghan received eight battle stars for World War II service.

== Bibliography ==
- Brown, David. Warship Losses of World War Two. Arms and Armour, London, Great Britain, 1990. ISBN 0-85368-802-8.
