= Type 92 machine gun =

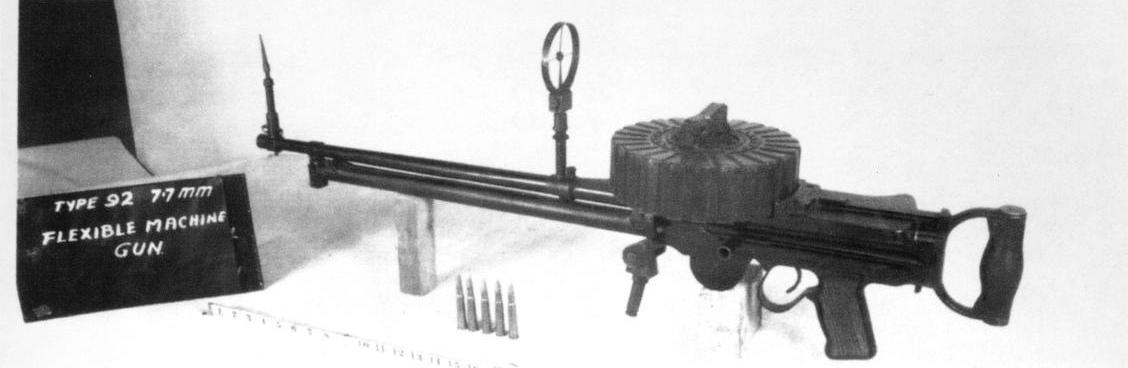
- A Type 92 machine gun, with a 97-round drum magazine and ring-type AA sight. Note the distinctive trigger guard.
- Type: Machine gun
- Place of origin: Japan

Service history
- In service: 1932–1945
- Used by: Imperial Japanese Navy
- Wars: World War II

Production history
- Manufacturer: Toyokawa Naval Arsenal; Yokosuka Naval Arsenal

Specifications
- Mass: 8.5 kg (19 lb)
- Length: 980 mm (39 in)
- Barrel length: 666 mm (26.2 in)
- Cartridge: 7.7×56mmR Type 87 IJN
- Caliber: 7.7 mm ( .303 inch)
- Action: Gas
- Rate of fire: 600 rounds/min
- Muzzle velocity: 743 m/s (2,440 ft/s)
- Feed system: 47 or 97-round pan magazine
- Sights: Iron

The Type 92 7.7mm machine gun (九二式七粍七機銃, Kyūni-shiki nana-miri-nana kijū) was developed for aerial use for the Imperial Japanese Navy in 1932. The Type 92 is a light machine gun and not to be confused with the similarly named Type 92 heavy machine gun.

== Description ==
It was the standard hand-held machine gun in multi-place IJN aircraft during the most part of the Pacific War. It proved to be seriously inadequate. Aircraft produced in the later part of the conflict often were equipped with weapons such as Type 1 and Type 2 machine guns or Type 99 cannon.

Essentially a copy of the shroudless post-World War I aircraft-mounted version of the British Lewis gun, the Type 92 was fed with a 97-round drum magazine and used on a flexible mount. It was chambered in a Japanese copy of the .303 British cartridge. The main external difference between the two models was the trigger guard, and cooling fins around the barrel and gas piston tube. Neither the post-World War I British aircraft Lewis nor the Japanese copy featured the distinctive thick barrel shroud of the original gun (although ground-based versions generally retained it). It was removed as it was found that the airflow past the aircraft was sufficient for cooling the barrel and eliminating the shroud reduced the mass.

== Installations ==
- Aichi D1A
- Aichi D3A
- Kawanishi E7K2
- Kawanishi H6K
- Kawanishi H8K
- Kyūshū Q1W
- Mitsubishi F1M2
- Mitsubishi G3M
- Mitsubishi G4M
- Nakajima B5N
- Nakajima B6N
- Yokosuka B4Y
- Yokosuka K5Y
- Various others

== See also ==
- Type 89 machine gun (the Imperial Japanese Army equivalent to the Type 92))
- MG 15 machine gun
- MG 81 machine gun
- Vickers VGO
