= Dirgantara Mandala Museum =

Central Museum of the Indonesian Air Force 'Dirgantara Mandala'
- Museum Pusat TNI AU Dirgantara Mandala
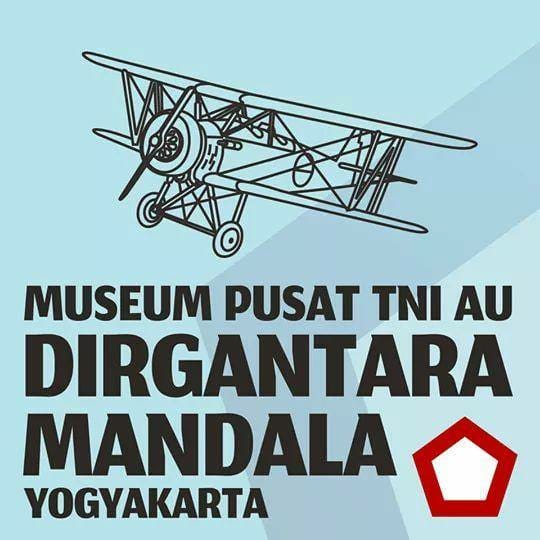
- The Official Logo of Museum Pusat TNI AU Dirgantara Mandala
- Established: April 4, 1969
- Location: Komplek TNI AU Lanud Adi Sutcipto, Jl. Raya Solo, Banguntapan, Bantul Regency, Yogyakarta, Indonesia
- Coordinates: 7.789935°S 110.415675°E
- Type: Air force museum
- Collection size: 1,159
- Owner: Indonesian Air Force

Dirgantara Mandala Museum, officially known as the Central Museum of the Indonesian Air Force "Dirgantara Mandala", is a museum of the history of the Indonesian Air Force. Dirgantara Mandala Museum also has a comprehensive collection of aviation in Indonesia, from early biplanes to modern jet engines. It is located in the complex of Adisutjipto International Airport in Bantul Regency, Yogyakarta, Indonesia.

== History ==
The museum for the Indonesian Air Force was first established on April 4, 1969. The first location of the museum of the Indonesian Air Force was at Jalan Tanah Abang Bukit in Jakarta. The inauguration of the first museum was by Chief of Staff of the Indonesian Air Force, Marshal Roesmin Noerjadin. On July 29, 1978, the museum was relocated to a building of Kesatrian AKABRI Bagian Udara in Yogyakarta. The reason of the transfer of location was because Yogyakarta was considered as an important place where the Indonesian Air Force was born as well as the center for Indonesian Air Force-related activities. Later, because of the expanding collection of the museum, especially with the development of new military aircraft, the museum was planned to be relocated again.

For the new location of the museum, the officials of the Indonesian Air Force chose a building of a former sugar factory located in the complex of the Adisutjipto airstrip complex. During the Japanese occupation period, this building was used as a logistic warehouse. On December 17, 1982, the Chief of Staff of the Indonesian Air Force, marshal Ashadi Tjahjadi signed a plaque for the establishment of the new Indonesian Air Force museum. On April 11, 1984, the instruction to rehabilitate the former sugar warehouse into a museum was released. The construction of the Dirgantara Mandala museum was completed in the same year. On July 29, 1984, the new Dirgantara Mandala Museum was inaugurated by marshal Sukardi.

== Museum and collection ==
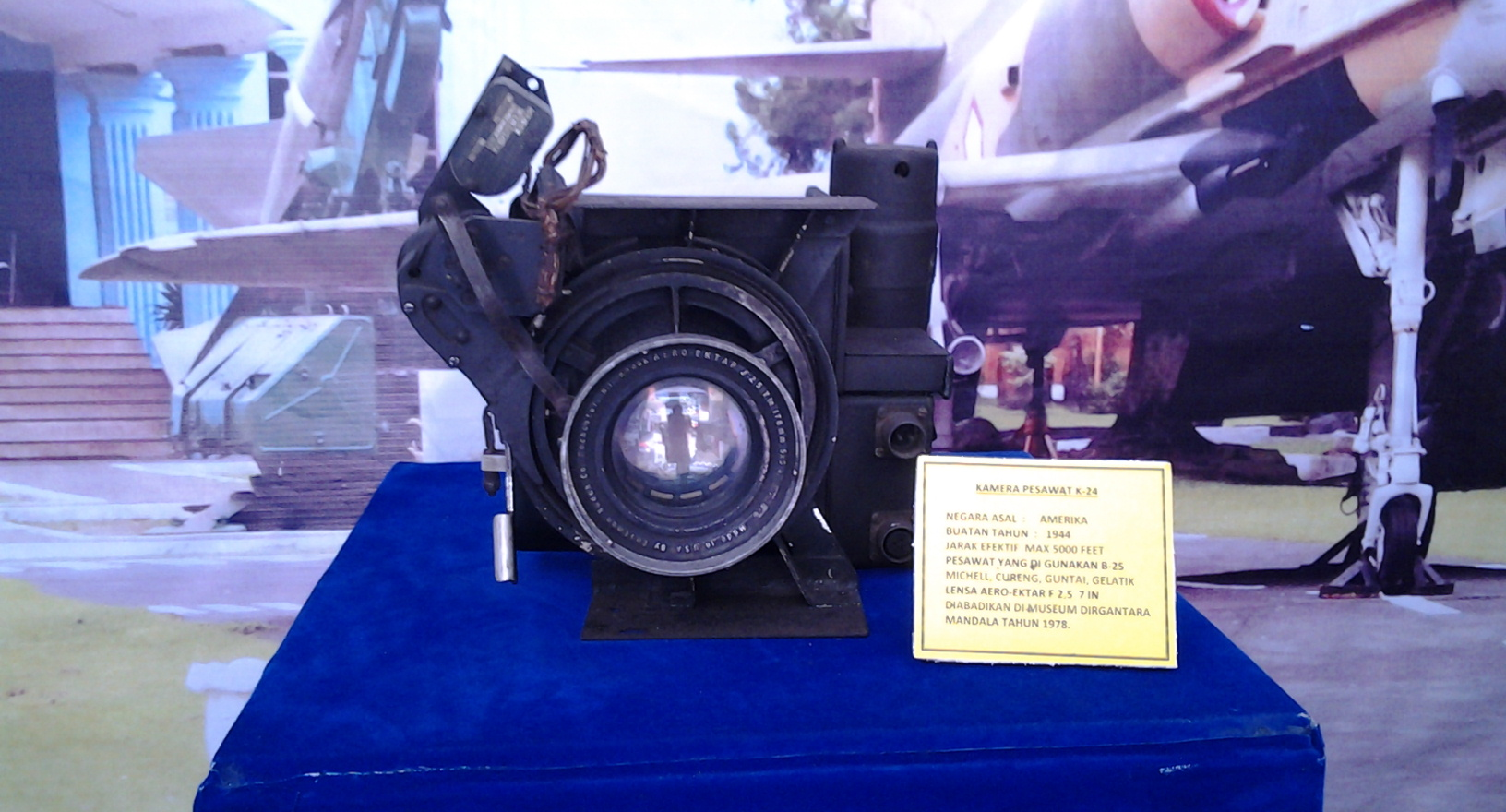
American K-24 camera (1944), which has been housed in the Dirgantara Mandala Museum since the beginning in 1978.

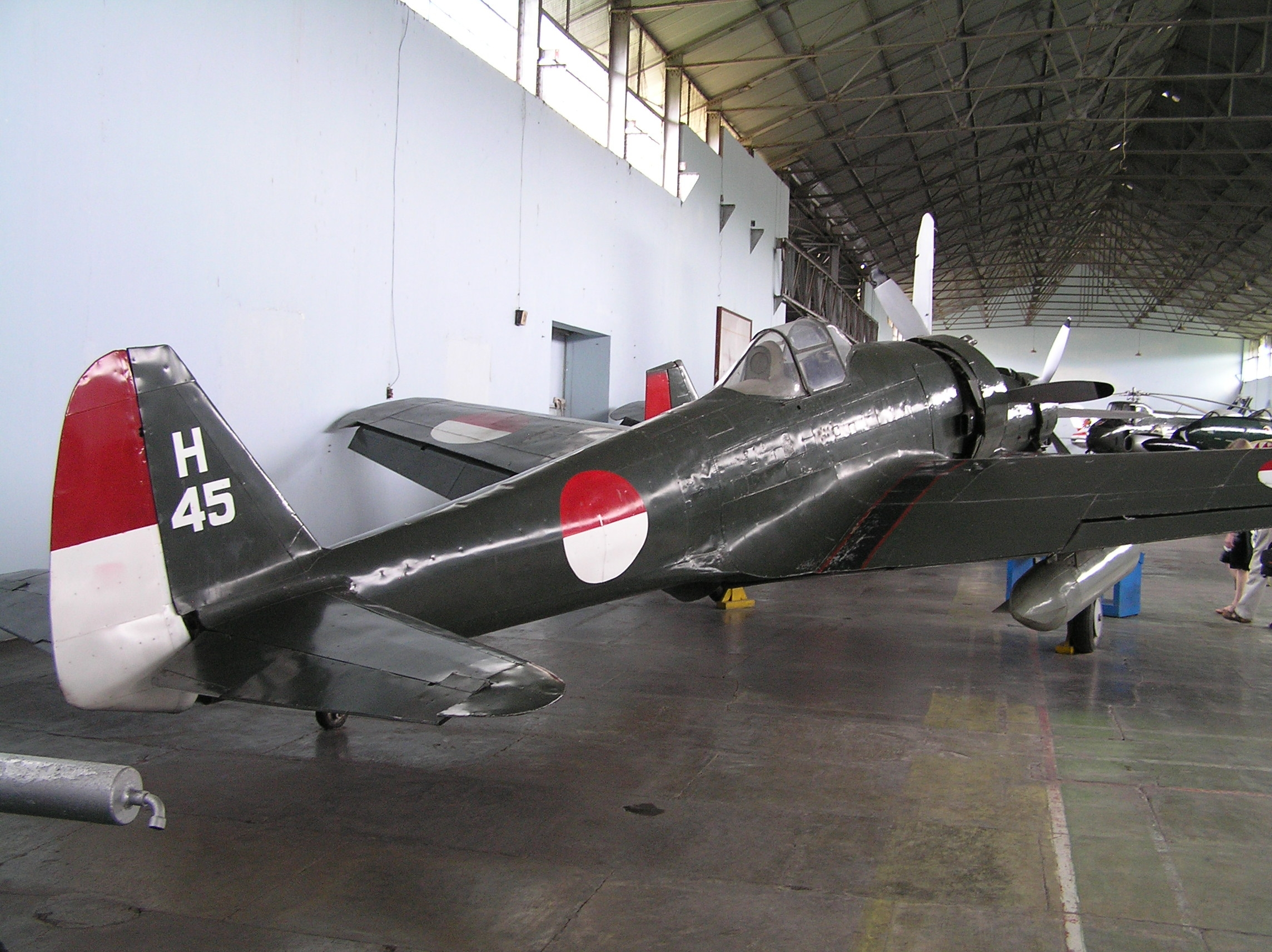
The Indonesian Air Force's Nakajima Ki-43 Oscar in the Dirgantara Mandala Museum.

The Central Museum of the Indonesian Air Force "Dirgantara Mandala" is located on a land of about 4.2 hectares (10 acres). The total building area is about 8,765 square metres (94,350 sq ft). The museum is divided into several rooms. The museum houses about 1,159 Indonesian aviation-related items.

The museum houses a collection of historic photographs related to the development of the Indonesian Air Force. There are a number of military aircraft and their replicas in the museum, mostly from the time of World War II and the Indonesian War for Independence. Among the notable collections are Nakajima Ki-43, Consolidated PBY Catalina, a replica of the WEL-I RI-X (the first produced Indonesian Aerospace), the Japanese A6M5 Zero Sen, some bombers (e.g. B-25 Mitchell, A-26 Invader, TU-16 Badger), some Cold War era of fighters such as Lavochkin La-11, CS-102 (Czech-built Mikoyan-Gurevich MiG-15UTI), Mikoyan-Gurevich MiG-17PF F-1182 and PZL-Mielec Lim-5 F-1160, Mikoyan-Gurevich MiG-19S, Mikoyan-Gurevich MiG-21F-13, CAC Sabre, Northrop F-5, Douglas A-4E, North American P-51 Mustang (known popularly in Indonesia si Cocor Merah), a number of gliders, the helicopter Hiller Model 360 (the first helicopter which was used by Sukarno as presidential helicopter) and missiles.

In 2015, the museum houses a prototype of nine bombs designed by the Indonesian Air Force in cooperation with the state-owned enterprises Pindad and Sari Bahari who specializes in military and commercial products. These are practice bombs and high explosive bombs which are used for the Indonesian Air Force's aircraft such as Sukhoi Su-30, F-16, F-5, Sky Hawk, and Super Tucano, etc.

== See also ==
- Satriamandala Museum
- List of museums and cultural institutions in Indonesia
