= Satriamandala Museum =

Coordinates: 6°13′53.16″S 106°49′7.46″E

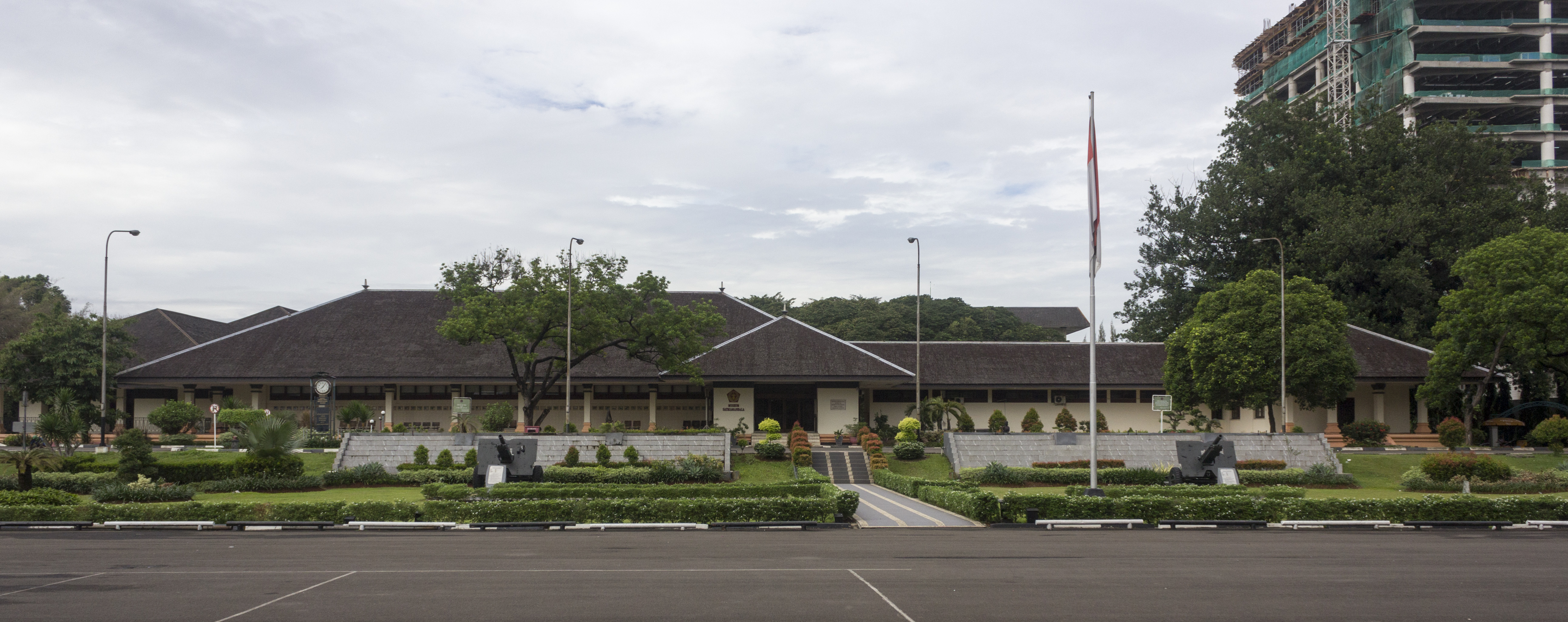
- Established: 5 October 1972
- Location: South Jakarta, Indonesia
- Type: Military museum
- Visitors: Average 48,000
- Public transit access: Denpasar or Widya Chandra Telkomsel

The Satriamandala Museum (also spelled Satria Mandala Museum) is the main museum for the Indonesian Armed Forces. Opened on 5 October 1972, it is located on 5.6 hectares (14 acres) of land in South Jakarta and holds numerous artifacts, weapons, and vehicles.

== Description ==
The museum is located on Gatot Soebroto Street in West Kuningan, Mampang, South Jakarta, and sits on 5.6 hectares (14 acres) of land; the exhibitions are divided amongst three buildings and the grounds. It is the main military museum in Indonesia. The name is Satria Mandala derives from Sanskrit and translates as "a sacred place for the knights". The museum is open to the public and has archives for persons researching the history of the armed forces.

== History ==
After 1968, the head of the Indonesian Armed Forces' history branch, Nugroho Notosusanto, conceived a modern museum showcasing the military's role in Indonesia's development. At that time, the country's military museums, such as the Struggle Museum in Yogyakarta, were underfunded and had poorly defined mission statements. There was not yet a museum showing the united role of the military, only museums of the role of the Army, Navy, and Air Force. Notosusanto modeled his design after the Australian War Memorial in Canberra and the Museo Nacional de Historia in Mexico City, Mexico.

At first, the military asked President Suharto to use the presidential palace in Bogor, a request which was denied. They were instead told to use the Wisma Yaso, built-in 1960 as a home for then-president Sukarno's Japanese wife Ratna Dewi Sari; the building had a Japanese style. The home was converted to a museum beginning on 15 November 1971. Although development continued until 1979, the museum was formally opened by President Suharto on Armed Forces Day, 5 October 1972. On its opening day, the museum housed only 20 dioramas.

An additional museum, Waspada Purbawisesa (translated as "Eternal Vigilance Museum"), was built on the grounds in 1987. After a series of protests by conservative Muslim groups were brought down by military force, such as the 1984 Tanjung Priok massacre, Suharto's New Order government gave more emphasis to Pancasila education; Waspada Purbawisesa played that role in Satriamandala.

In January 2010, Satriamandala was declared a Cultural Property of Indonesia. It averaged 48,000 annual visitors between 2006 and 2008.

== Exhibitions ==
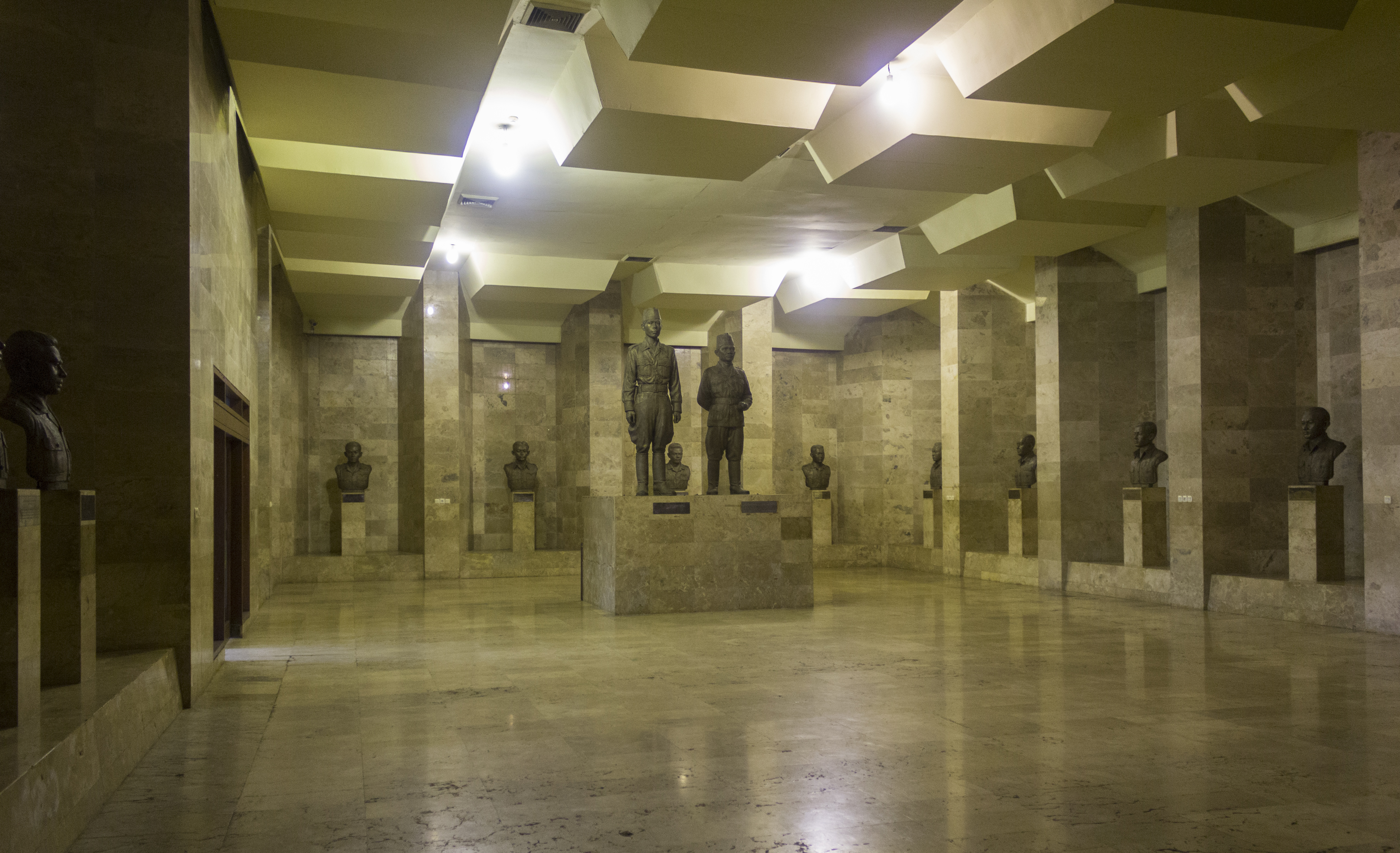
The Hall of Heroes

The museum contains numerous exhibitions on Indonesian military history. It includes a room dedicated to squadron banners, one dedicated to artifacts belonging to General Oerip Soemohardjo (the military's first Chief of Staff), General of the Army Sudirman (the military's first commander in chief), General Abdul Haris Nasution, and General Suharto. A nearby area contains hundreds of rifles, grenades, sharpened bamboo sticks, and other weapons dating from the 1940s and later. A Hall of Heroes holds life-size statues of members of the military who have been declared National Heroes of Indonesia, with Sudirman and Oerip in places of honour at the back of the hall.

There are also 75 dioramas of pre-independence rebellions, the seconds leading to the proclamation of independence, the national revolution, and military efforts after the revolution. The dioramas were created by craftsmen from Yogyakarta. Further exhibitions in the building are photographic.

It also includes several war machines, mostly on the museum grounds. This includes the ship KRI Pattimura, which saw action in Papua; aircraft such as the Yokosuka K5Y1, Mansyu Ki-79, North American AT-16 Harvard, North American B-25 Mitchell, North American P-51 Mustang, Piper Cub, Douglas C-47 Skytrain, Fairey Gannet, and the Mil Mi-4 & Bell 204 helicopter; and land machines such as tanks, ambulances, and a Willys MB belonging to Sudirman.

Waspada Purbawisesa, a five-story pentagon-shaped museum houses dioramas and artifacts from military conflicts against Islamic groups, both conservative and extremist. It includes artifacts from the defeat of the Darul Islam revolt and dioramas of other military conflicts with Islamic groups.

== Noteworthy collections ==
- A draft of the Proclamation of Indonesian Independence in Sukarno's handwriting
- The litter in which General Sudirman was carried during his seven months as a guerrilla
- RI Seulawah 1, a Douglas C-47 Skytrain that became The first Presidential Aircraft of the Indonesian Government
- Soviet Weapons and Equipment That have been used During Operation Trikora
- An A-4E Skyhawk TT-0438. Acquired from Israel to replace the Soviet built aircraft.

== See also ==
- List of museums and cultural institutions in Indonesia
