= MG 81 machine gun =

MG 81
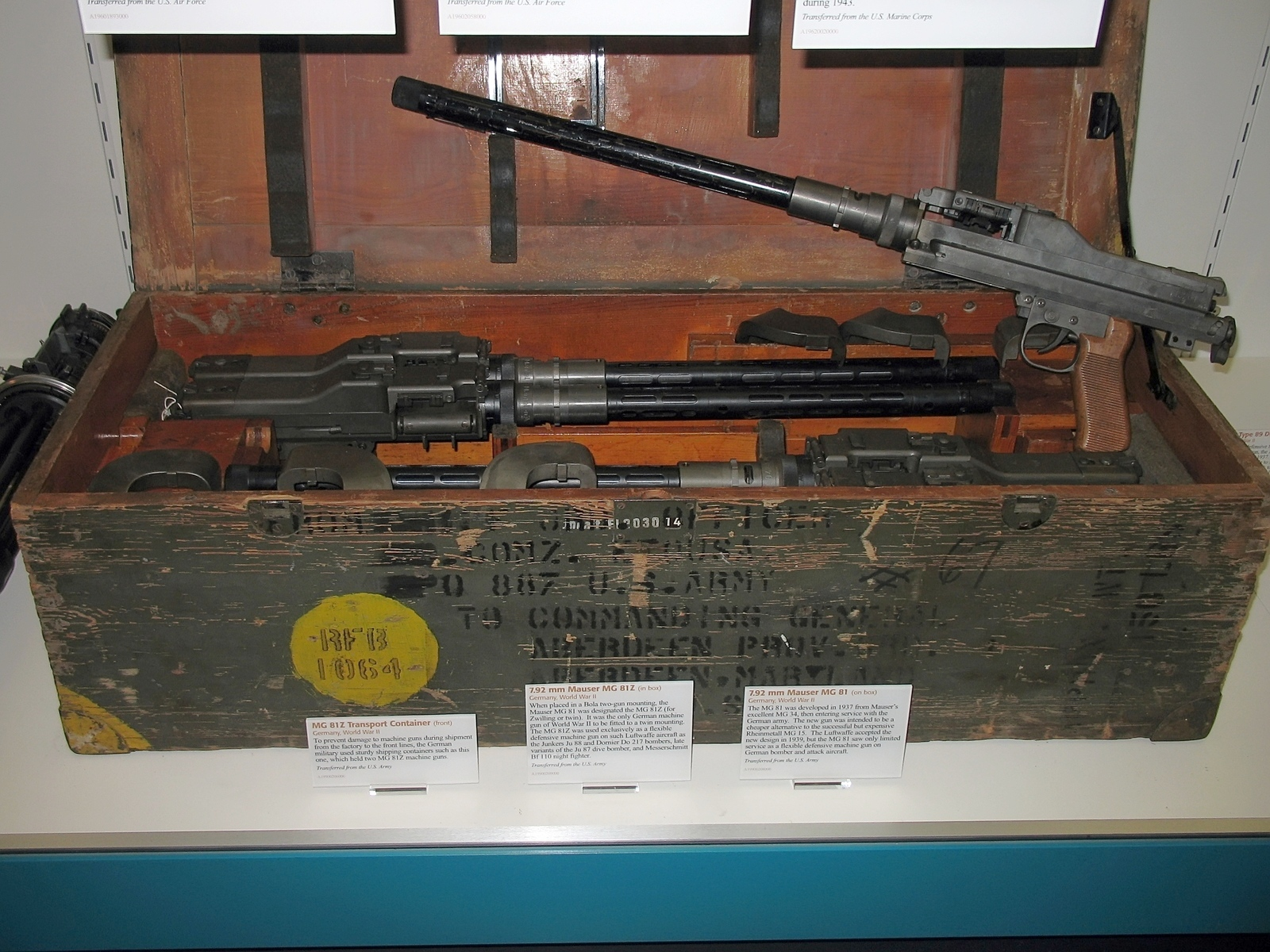
- MG 81 (upper) and MG 81Z (in box)
- Type: Machine gun
- Place of origin: Nazi Germany

Service history
- Used by: Nazi Germany
- Wars: World War II

Production history
- Variants: MG 81Z

Specifications
- Mass: 6.5 kg (14.33 lb)
- Length: 965 mm (38.0 in) (with flash hider)
- Barrel length: 475 mm (18.7 in)
- Cartridge: 7.92×57mm Mauser; 7.62×51mm NATO (post-war)
- Caliber: 7,9 (7,92+0,04)
- Action: Recoil-operated, gas assisted, open-bolt
- Rate of fire: 1,400–1,600 rounds/min
- Muzzle velocity: 705 m/s (2,310 ft/s) (sS ball ammunition)
- Feed system: Belt-fed

The MG 81 is a German belt fed 7.92×57mm Mauser machine gun which was used in flexible installations in World War II Luftwaffe aircraft, in which capacity it replaced the older drum magazine-fed MG 15.

The MG 81 was developed by Mauser as a derivative of their successful MG 34 general-purpose machine gun. Development focus was to reduce production cost and time and to optimize the machine gun for use in aircraft. Developed in 1938/1939, it was in production from 1940 to 1945.

== Variants ==
A special twin-mount MG 81Z (the Z suffix stands for Zwilling, meaning "twin") was introduced in 1942. It paired up two of the weapons on one mount to provide even more firepower with a maximum cyclic rate of fire of 3,200 rounds per minute without requiring much more space than a standard machine gun. Towards the end of the war many specimens were delivered to the army and equipped for use in ground battles with shoulder rest and bipod.

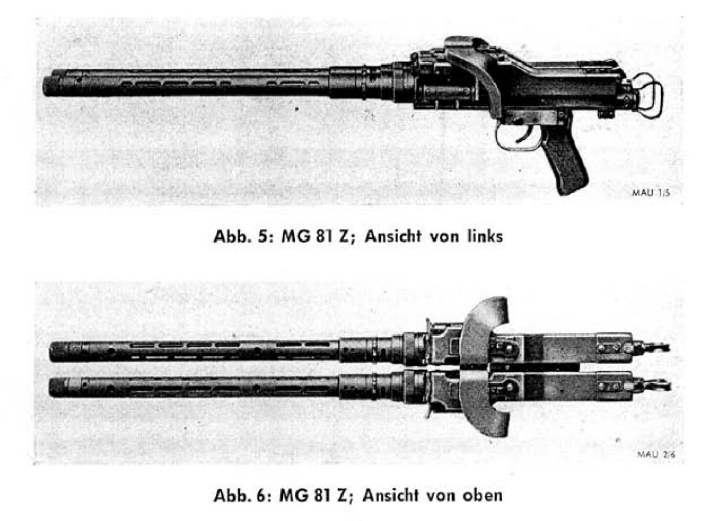
A German twin-mount MG 81 Z aircraft MG - view from the Luftwaffe manual, 1944.

After West Germany's entry into NATO in May 1955, Mauser offered the MG 81 chambered in 7.62×51mm NATO. The twin-barrel MG 81Z was marketed for helicopter fixed mount with theoretical firepower of 6,800–7,000 rounds per minute for a MG 81Z mounted on each side of the helicopter. The MG 81 was also marketed for infantry use with bipod, wood buttstock, and reduced fire rate of 1,200 rounds per minute.

== Applications ==
The MG 81Z was found in many unique installations in Luftwaffe combat aircraft, such as a pair of MG 81Z (for a total of four guns) installed in the hollow tail cone of the Dornier Do 217 K-2. Designated R19 (R for Rüstsatz) as a factory designed field conversion/upgrade kit, it allowed the pilot of the Do 217 to shoot at pursuers.

Another application was the Gießkanne (Watering can), an externally mounted pod with three gun pairs, making a total of six guns and their ammunition. Able to fire at a cyclic rate of 9,000 rounds per minute, this was attached to Junkers Ju 87 or Ju 88 in an underwing mount and used to strafe ground targets.

== Specifications ==
MG 81

- Weight: 6.5 kg (14 lb)
- Length: 915 mm (36.0 in) (965 mm (38.0 in) with flash hider)
- Muzzle velocity: 705 m/s (2,310 ft/s) (sS ball ammunition), 755 m/s (2,480 ft/s), 785 m/s (2,580 ft/s) or 790 m/s (2,600 ft/s), depending on ammo type
- Rate of fire: 1,400–1,600 rpm (sS ball ammunition)
- Rate of fire: 1,700–1,800 rpm
- Rate of fire: 800 rpm (coaxial mount)

MG 81Z

- Weight: 12.9 kg (28.44 lb)
- Length: 915 mm (965& mm with flash hider)
- Muzzle velocity: 705 m/s (2,310 ft/s) (sS ball ammunition), 755 m/s (2,480 ft/s), 785 m/s (2,580 ft/s) or 790 m/s (2,600 ft/s), depending on ammo type
- Rate of fire: 2,800–3,200 rpm (sS ball ammunition)
- Rate of fire: 3,400–3,600 rpm

== See also ==
- ShKAS
- Vickers K machine gun
- List of firearms
- List of secondary and special-issue World War II infantry weapons
