= 701st Naval Air Group =

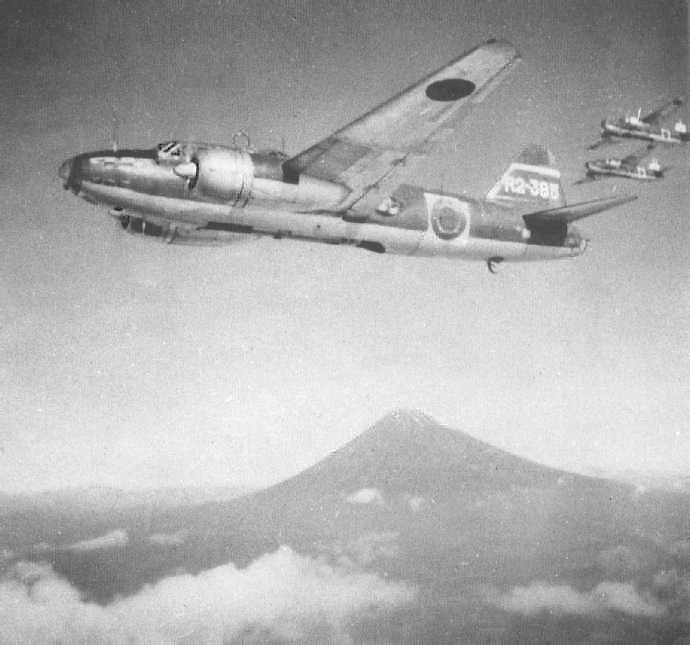
- Mitsubishi G4M1 R2-385 of 702nd Attack Squadron in September 1944.
- Active: November 1, 1942 – March 15, 1943; February 20, 1944 – postwar.
- Country: Empire of Japan
- Allegiance: Empire of Japan
- Branch: (Empire of Japan) Imperial Japanese Navy
- Type: Naval aviation unit
- Role: Until 15 March 1943; Bomber, torpedo bomber And after 20 February 1944; Fighter, bomber, torpedo bomber, reconnaissance
- Size: 48 aircraft (initial)
- Part of: 22nd Air Flotilla; 51st Carrier Division; 25th Air Flotilla; 5th Air Fleet
- Garrison/HQ: Bihoro, Japan; Tinian, Marianas; Ruot, Kwajalein Atoll; Vunakanau, New Britain; Toyohashi, Japan; Kanoya, Japan; Kokubu, Japan
- Aircraft flown: G3M Type 96 "Nell"; G4M Type 1 "Betty"; P1Y Ginga "Frances"; D3A Type 99 "Val"; D4Y Suisei "Judy"; B6N Tenzan "Jill"; B5N Type 97 "Kate"; A6M Type 0 "Zeke"; C6N Saiun "Myrt"
- Engagements: World War II: New Guinea campaign; Battle of Rennell Island; Formosa Air Battle; Philippines Campaign; Battle of Okinawa

Insignia
- Identification symbol: M (1942); R2 (February 1944); 01 or 701 (November 1944)

The 701st Naval Air Group (第七〇一海軍航空隊, Dai Nana-Maru-Hito Kaigun Kōkūtai) was an aircraft and airbase garrison unit of the Imperial Japanese Navy (IJN) during the Pacific campaign of World War II.

== First generation (ex-Mihoro Naval Air Group) ==
=== Structure ===
- Higher unit
  - 22nd Air Flotilla (1 November 1942–15 March 1943, dissolved.)
- Commanding officers
  - Capt. Yamada Yutaka (49) - 1 November 1942 - 15 March 1943

== Second Generation (ex-Toyohashi Naval Air Group) ==
=== Structure ===
- Higher unit
  - 51st Carrier Division (20 February 1944–14 November 1944)
  - 25th Air Flotilla (15 November 1944–9 February 1945)
  - 5th Air Fleet (10 February 1945–postwar)
- Lower unit
  - 305th Fighter Squadron (20 March 1945–5 May 1945)
  - 311th Fighter Squadron (5 March 1945–24 May 1945)
  - 5th Attack Squadron (5 January 1945–9 February 1945)
  - 102nd Attack Squadron (1 October 1944–9 December 1944)
  - 103rd Attack Squadron (1 October 1944–postwar.)
  - 105th Attack Squadron (10 February 1945–postwar.)
  - 251st Attack Squadron (10 February 1945–19 April 1945)
  - 252nd Attack Squadron (1 October 1944–14 December 1944)
  - 256th Attack Squadron (1 January 1945–9 February 1945)
  - 406th Attack Squadron (25 January 1945–9 February 1945)
  - 702nd Attack Squadron (1 April 1944–9 October 1944)
  - 3rd Reconnaissance Squadron (15 November 1944–9 February 1945)
- Commanding officers
  - Capt. Yamada Yutaka (49) - 20 February 1944 - 5 September 1944
  - Capt. Kida Tatsuhiko (50) - 5 September 1944 - 29 May 1945
  - Capt. Enoo Yoshio (51) - 29 May 1945 - 15 August 1945

== Bibliography ==
- The Japanese Modern Historical Manuscripts Association, Organizations, structures and personnel affairs of the Imperial Japanese Army & Navy, University of Tokyo Press, Tōkyō, Japan, 1971, ISBN 978-4-13-036009-8.
- Bunrin-Dō Co., Ltd., Tōkyō, Japan.
  - Famous airplanes of the world
    - No. 59, Type 1 Attack Bomber, 1996, ISBN 4-89319-056-3.
    - No. 91, Type 96 Attack Bomber, 2001, ISBN 4-893-19089X.
  - Koku-Fan Illustrated No. 42, Japanese Imperial Army & Navy Aircraft Color, Marking, 1988.
- Model Art, Model Art Co. Ltd., Tōkyō, Japan.
  - No. 406, Special issue Camouflage & Markings of Imperial Japanese Navy Bombers in W.W.II, 1993.
  - No. 458, Special issue Imperial Japanese Navy Air Force Suicide Attack Unit "Kamikaze", 1995.
  - No. 553, Special issue I.J.N. Carrier Attack Bomber, 2000.
- Heihachi Yoshitake (One of the members of the Mihoro Naval Air Group), Biography of the Mihoro Naval Air Group, K.K. Art Insatsu, Bihoro, Japan, 1982.
- Alumni Association of the 705th Naval Air Group, History of the 705th Naval Air Group, Sougo Insatsu Kougei K.K., Tokyo, Japan, 1985.
- Japan Center for Asian Historical Records (, National Archives of Japan, Tōkyō, Japan.
  - Reference Code: C08051771200, Transition table of formation of Imperial Japan Navy Air Units (special establishment) during Pacific War, Japan Demobilization Agency, 1949.
