= Aichi B7A Ryūsei =

Japanese carrier-borne torpedo and dive bomber

B7A Ryūsei
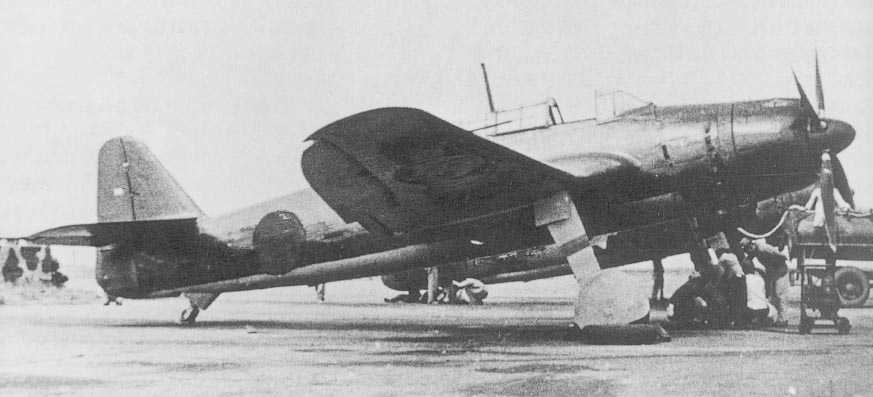

General information
- Type: Torpedo bomber and Dive bomber
- National origin: Japan
- Manufacturer: Aichi Kokuki; 21st Naval Air Arsenal
- Primary user: Imperial Japanese Navy Air Service
- Number built: 114 total

History
- Manufactured: 1942–1945
- First flight: May 1942
- Retired: September 1945

The Aichi B7A Ryūsei (流星, "Shooting Star") (Allied reporting name "Grace"), was a large carrier-borne torpedo-dive bomber designed and produced by Japanese aircraft manufacturer Aichi Kokuki. It was operated by the Imperial Japanese Navy Air Service (IJNAS) during the Second World War.

Designed to replace the Yokosuka D4Y dive bomber and the Nakajima B6N torpedo bomber, work began on developing the B7A in 1941, just prior to the start of the Pacific War. The B7A was furnished with dive brakes and a folding wing, while power was provided by a single Nakajima NK9C Homare 12 18-cylinder radial engine. Armaments were stowed both in an internal bomb bay and on external attachment points, permitting the carriage of munitions such as the Type 91 torpedo, while the defensive weapons comprised a pair of cannons and a single flexibly-mounted machine gun. In spite of its size and weight, the B7A was a relatively fast and agile aircraft. In May 1942, the prototype B7A performed its maiden flight; while engine-related difficulties delayed quantity production of the type, the aircraft demonstrated strong performance in both handling and speed once fitted with an appropriate powerplant.

By the time the B7A entered service in late 1944, Japan's military circumstances had declined substantially. Specifically, there was a shortage of suitably-equipped aircraft carriers (most of the IJN's carriers lacked the appropriate arresting gear), especially after the losses of Taihō and the Shinano in 1944, which meant that the type would operate primarily from land bases instead. Furthermore, the B7A was only produced in only small numbers, in part due to the destruction of Aichi's facility in Funakata. Thus, it had relatively little chance to distinguish itself in combat prior to the Surrender of Japan in August 1945.

== Design and development ==
The B7A Ryūsei (Internally designated AM-23 by Aichi) was designed in response to a 1941 16-Shi requirement issued by the Imperial Japanese Navy Air Service (IJNAS) for a carrier attack bomber that would replace both the Nakajima B6N Tenzan torpedo plane and the Yokosuka D4Y Suisei dive bomber in IJNAS service. It was intended for use aboard a new generation of Taihō-class carriers, the first of which was laid down in July 1941. Because the deck elevators on the Taihōs had a larger square area than those of older Japanese carriers, the longstanding maximum limit of 11 m (36 ft) on carrier aircraft length could now be lifted. A key objective of the requirement was to extend the reach of Japanese carrier-borne attack aircraft, which was reasoned to increase the survivability of the IJN's carriers as a result of being able to maintain greater distance from enemy forces.

The B7A featured all-metal construction, save for the fabric coverings of the flight control surfaces. Chief Engineer Toshio Ozaki (Note: Toshio Ozaki's name has often written as Norio Ozaki, but this is incorrect because the Kanji for both first names are the same and often confused) opted for a mid-wing arrangement for the B7A to provide for an internal bomb bay and to ensure enough clearance for the aircraft's 3.5 m (11 ft) four-bladed propeller. This in turn necessitated the adoption of an inverted gull wing, similar to the F4U Corsair, in order to shorten the length of the main landing gear. This wing featured extendable ailerons with a ten-degree range of deflection, enabling them to act as auxiliary flaps. Furthermore, dive brakes were fitted underneath just outboard of the fuselage. The outer portion of the wings could be hydraulically folded upwards for more compact stowage onboard ship, reducing its overall span from 14.4 m (47 ft) to approximately 7.9 m (26 ft).

Selection of a powerplant was dictated by the Imperial Japanese Navy (IJN), which requested that Aichi design the aircraft around the 1,360 kW (1,825 hp) Nakajima NK9C Homare 12 18-cylinder two-row air-cooled radial engine. This powerplant was expected to become the IJN's standard aircraft engine in the 1,340 kW (1,800 hp) to 1,641 kW (2,200 hp) range. One production model B7A2 was later fitted with a 1,491 kW (2,000 hp) Nakajima Homare 23 radial engine and plans were also made to fit the 1,641 kW (2,200 hp) Mitsubishi MK9 radial to an advanced version of the Ryūsei (designated B7A3 Ryūsei Kai) but the latter effort never came to fruition.

The B7A had a weight-carrying capacity stemming from its requirements, resulting in a weapons load no greater than its predecessors. The presence of an internal bomb bay with two high-load-capability attachment points allowed the aircraft to carry two 250 kg (550 lb) or six 60 kg (132 lb) bombs. Alternatively, it could carry a single externally mounted Type 91 torpedo, weighing up to 848 kg (1,870 lb). (Note: The Type 91 torpedo should not be mistaken for the famous "Long Lance", Type 93 torpedo, which was much too heavy and unfit for being deployed from an aircraft; a derived "Type 94" for aircraft use had been developed but was never deployed.) The aircraft's defensive armament initially consisted of a pair of 20 mm Type 99 Model 2 cannons in the wing roots and a single flexibly-mounted 7.92 mm Type 1 machine gun mounted in the rear cockpit. Later production models of the B7A2 featured a 13 mm Type 2 machine gun in place of the 7.92 mm gun.

Despite the aircraft 's weight and size, it displayed fighter-like handling and performance, beating the version of the A6M Zero in service at the time. For the era, the B7A was both relatively fast and highly manoeuvrable.

Given the codename "Grace" by the Allies, the prototype B7A performed its maiden flight in May 1942, but teething problems with the experimental NK9C Homare engine and necessary modifications to the airframe meant that the type did not enter into production until two years later in May 1944. Despite being easier to produce than the Yokosuka D4Y, which Aichi had produced numerous of, the manufacturing rate of the B7A was relatively slow. Nine prototype B7A1s were built and 80 production version B7A2s completed by Aichi before a severe earthquake in May 1945 destroyed the factory at Funakata where they were being assembled. A further 25 examples were produced at the 21st Naval Air Arsenal at Ōmura.

== Operational history ==
In June 1944, Taihō was the only IJN aircraft carrier then suitably equipped to operate the B7A Ryūsei in its intended role. Other Japanese carriers lacked the modern arresting gear necessary to assist the recovery of aircraft weighing over 4,000 kilograms (8,800 lb). However, Taiho was sunk during the Battle of the Philippine Sea before enough B7As were even available to embark. Imperial Japan only completed one other carrier capable of operating the B7A, Shinano, which was sunk by the Balao-class submarine USS Archerfish on 29 November 1944, just ten days after being commissioned.

As a consequence of these carrier losses, the B7A was relegated to operating from various land bases, being primarily flown by the Yokosuka and 752nd Air Groups.

== Variants ==
B7A1
One prototype and eight supplementary prototypes.
B7A2
Two-seat torpedo-dive bomber aircraft for the Imperial Japanese Navy; 105 built.
B7A2 Experimental
One aircraft fitted with a 1,491 kW (2,000 hp) Nakajima Homare 23 radial engine.
B7A3
Proposed version with a 1641 kW (2,200 hp) Mitsubishi MK9A (Ha-43). Not built.

=== Number built ===
According to Model Art (2000), p. 72.

- Funakata Factory, Aichi Kokuki, Nagoya, work number 3201-3289.

	January	February	March	April	May	June	July	August	September	October	November	December	Sub total
1942												1	1
1943	0	0	0	1	0	1	1	1	1	0	1	0	6
1944	1	1	0	0	1	0	1	1	2	5	5	9	26
1945	7	12	11	13	8	3	2	0					56

- 21st Naval Air Arsenal, Imperial Japanese Navy, Ōmura, work number 1-25.

	January	February	March	April	May	June	July	August	September	October	November	December	Sub total
1944				1	0	1	0	1	4	1	0	0	8
1945	2	1	3	2	4	0	4	1					17

== Operators ==
Japan

- Imperial Japanese Navy Air Service
  - Yokosuka Naval Air Group
  - 131st Naval Air Group
  - 752nd Naval Air Group
  - 1001st Naval Air Group
  - 5th Attack Squadron, a part of 131st/752nd Naval Air Group

== Specifications (B7A2) ==
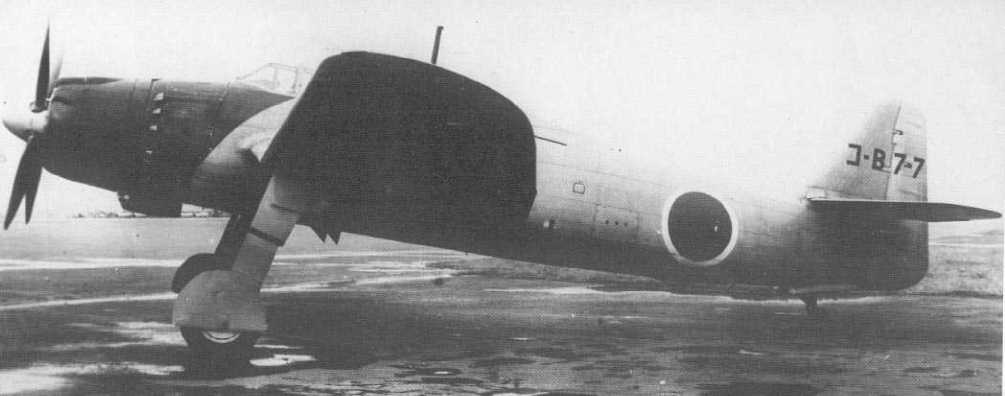
Aichi B7A Ryūsei, prototype #7. Naval Air Technical Arsenal Ko-B7-7.

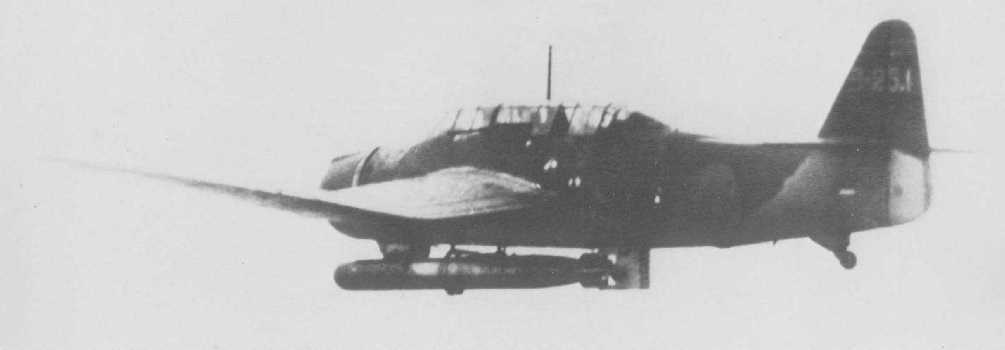
Aichi B7A carrying a torpedo. Yokosuka Naval Air Group Yo-231.

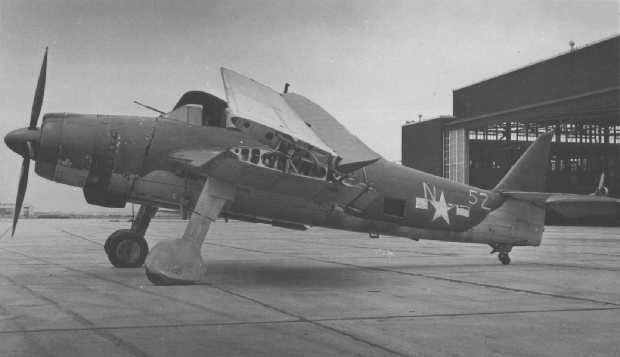
Captured Aichi B7A, 1946.

Data from Aircraft of World War II - 300 of the World's Greatest aircraft 1939–45, Aichi B7A Ryusei (Shooting Star), and Japanese Aircraft of the Pacific War

General characteristics

- Crew: 2
- Length: 11.49 m (37 ft 8 in)
- Wingspan: 14.4 m (47 ft 3 in)
- Height: 4.075 m (13 ft 4 in)
- Wing area: 35.4 m^{2} (381 sq ft)
- Empty weight: 3,810 kg (8,400 lb)
- Gross weight: 5,625 kg (12,401 lb)
- Max takeoff weight: 6,500 kg (14,330 lb)
- Powerplant: 1 × Nakajima NK9C Homare 12 18-cylinder air-cooled radial piston engine, 1,361 kW (1,825 hp) for take-off

1,250 kW (1,670 hp) at 2,400 m (7,900 ft)
1,160 kW (1,560 hp) at 6,550 m (21,490 ft)

- Propellers: 4-bladed constant-speed propeller, 3.5 m (11 ft 6 in) diameter

Performance

- Maximum speed: 567 km/h (352 mph, 306 kn) at 6,550 m (21,490 ft)
- Range: 3,038 km (1,888 mi, 1,640 nmi)
- Service ceiling: 11,250 m (36,900 ft)
- Rate of climb: 9.6 m/s (1,890 ft/min)
- Time to altitude: 4,000 m (13,000 ft) in six minutes and 55 seconds
- Wing loading: 158.9 kg/m^{2} (32.5 lb/sq ft)
- Power/mass: 0.242 kW/kg (0.147 hp/lb)

Armament

- Guns:
  - 2× 20 mm (0.787 in) Type 99 Model 2 cannon in the wings
  - 1× 7.92 mm (0.312 in) Type 1 machine gun or 13 mm (0.512 in) Type 2 machine gun in the rear cockpit
- Bombs:
  - 800 kg (1,764 lb) of general ordnance or
  - 1× 800 kg (1,764 lb) torpedo

== See also ==
Aircraft of comparable role, configuration, and era

- Douglas BTD Destroyer
- Douglas A-1 Skyraider
- Fairey Spearfish
- Blackburn Firebrand

Related lists

- List of aircraft of World War II
- List of bomber aircraft
- List of military aircraft of Japan
