= Yokosuka D4Y Suisei =

Japanese carrier-based dive bomber

D4Y Suisei
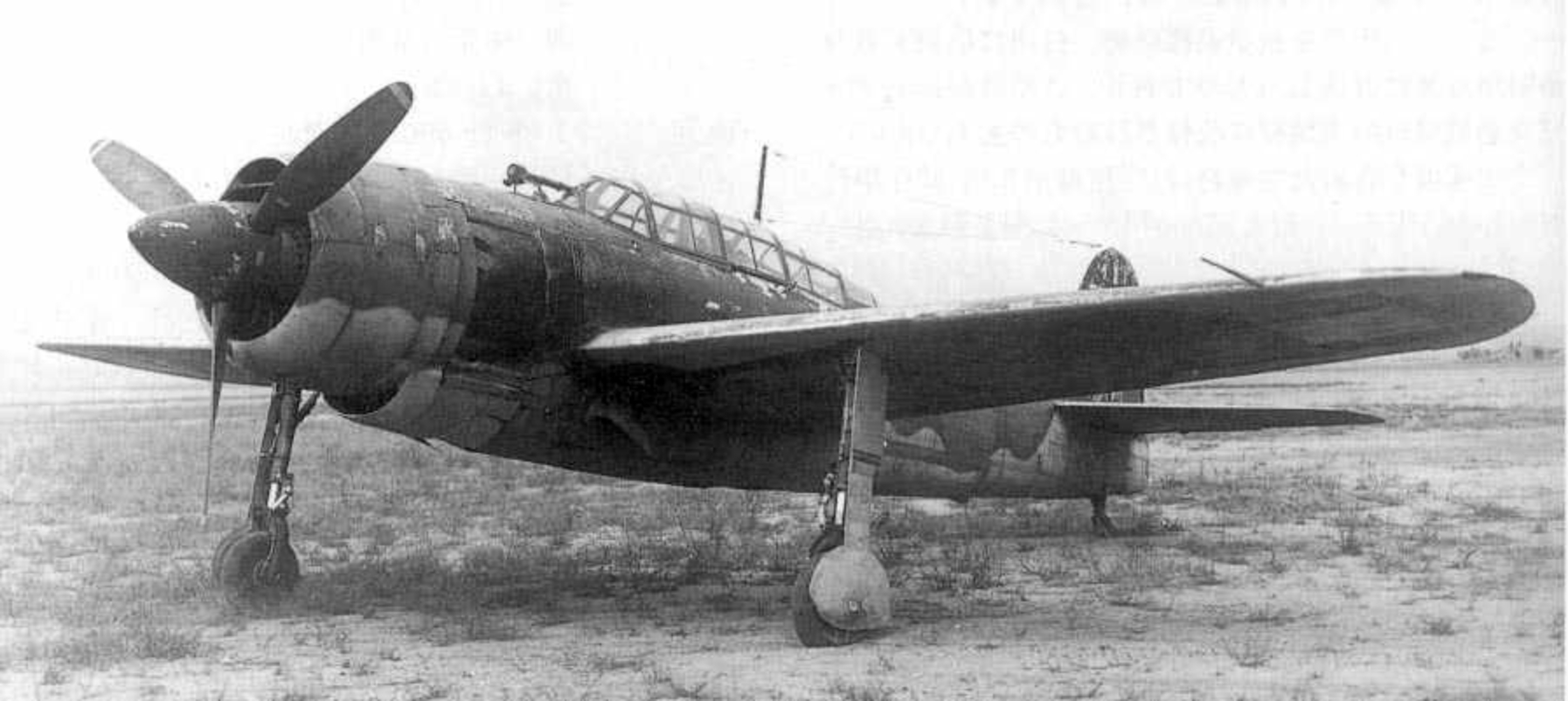
- Yokosuka D4Y3 Suisei Model 33

General information
- Type: Dive bomber, reconnaissance, night fighter
- National origin: Japan
- Manufacturer: Yokosuka
- Status: Retired
- Primary user: Imperial Japanese Navy Air Service
- Number built: 2,038

History
- Manufactured: 1942–1945
- Introduction date: 1942
- First flight: December 1940
- Retired: 1945

The Yokosuka D4Y Suisei (彗星, comet) is a twin-seat carrier-based dive bomber developed by the Japanese defence manufacturer Yokosuka Naval Air Technical Arsenal. Operated by the Imperial Japanese Navy (IJN) throughout World War II, it was assigned the Allied reporting name Judy.

Development of the aircraft began in 1938 as a carrier-based dive bomber to replace the Aichi D3A, and drew considerably upon the German Heinkel He 118. A single-engine low-wing monoplane, it possessed a relatively slender fuselage along with a retractable undercarriage and wing-mounted dive brakes, permitting it to achieve high speeds and excellent maneuverability despite a relatively high wing loading. Bombs were fitted underneath the wings and within internal bomb bay in the fuselage; it was also armed with two forward-facing 7.7 mm (.303 in) Type 97 aircraft machine guns and a rear-facing 7.92 mm (.312 in) Type 1 machine gun. To achieve the stipulated long range performance, early models of the D4Y lacked both self-sealing fuel tanks and armour, akin to most other Japanese aircraft of the era.

The first D4Y1 was complete in November 1940 and made its maiden flight at Yokosuka the following month. The flight testing phase was protacted by several difficulties, including with flutter, which required structural alterations to resolve. While the aircraft was originally conceived as a dive bomber, the D4Y was used in other roles including reconnaissance, night fighter and special attack. (Note: Special attack included reconnaissance and regular bombing attacks besides kamikaze attacks.) The type made its combat debut as a reconnaissance aircraft when two pre-production D4Y1-Cs embarked aboard Sōryū to take part in the Battle of Midway in 1942. It was not until March 1943 that the D4Y1 was accepted for use as a dive bomber. While the early D4Y1 and D4Y2 featured the liquid-cooled Aichi Atsuta V12 engine, a licensed version of the German Daimler-Benz DB 601, the later D4Y3 and D4Y4 featured the air-cooled Mitsubishi MK8P Kinsei 62 radial engine, which was more reliable but possessed high fuel consumption. The D4Y1 Kai was fitted with catapult apparatus to permit operations from compact carriers. It was not until the final variant, the D4Y4, that the aircraft was fitted with bulletproof glass and armor protection for both the crew and fuel tanks.

The D4Y was one of the fastest dive bombers of the conflict, particularly the D4Y4, which aviation historian Max Gadney said was the "fastest dive-bomber of World War II... faster than the Zero". Only the delays in its development hindered the D4Y's service while its predecessor, the slower fixed-gear Aichi D3A, remained operational for much longer than intended. In October 1944, an attack by a lone D4Y resulted in the sinking of light carrier USS Princeton in the Battle of Leyte Gulf. Similarly, in March 1945, a single D4Y managed to hit the carrier USS Franklin with two bombs, nearly sinking Franklin and resulting in the loss of almost 800 of her crew. Famously, a D4Y was used in one of the final kamikaze attacks in 1945, hours after the surrender of Japan, with Vice Admiral Matome Ugaki in the rear cockpit. All remaining aircraft were withdrawn shortly after the Surrender of Japan, which ended the conflict.

== Design and development ==
=== Background and features ===
The development of the Yokosuka D4Y Suisei can be traced back to early 1938 and an arrangement between the Imperial Japanese Navy (IJN) and Germany regarding the production rights for the Heinkel He 118 along with a pattern aircraft. This aircraft, designed DXHe1, underwent flight testing at Yokosuka and impressed the Naval Staff to the extent that plans to locally produce a carrier-based variant were under consideration. Instead, the Imperial Japanese Navy Aviation Bureau (Kaigun Kōkū Hombu) opted to issue requirements of a Navy Experimental 13-Shi (Note: In the Japanese Navy designation system, specifications were given a Shi number based on the year of the Emperor's reign it was issued. In this case 13-Shi stood for 1938, the 13th year of the Shōwa era.) Carrier Borne specification for an carrier-borne dive bomber to replace the Aichi D3A. According to the aviation author Rene J. Francillon, this specification was heavily influenced by the He 118. Performance stipulations included a maximum speed of 280 knots, cruising speed of 230 knots, 800 nautical mile range while carrying bombs, 1,200 nautical mile range without bombs, and the ability to operate from the IJN's smaller carriers.

In late 1938, the Yokosuka Naval Air Technical Arsenal was instructed to design an aircraft to satisfy the specification. Its design team, headed by Masao Yamana, opted for a relatively compact and aerodynamically clean monoplane with a mid-mounted wing, which possessed a similar span and area to the Mitsubishi A6M Zero fighter, thus precluding the need for a folding mechanism. Furthermore, the wing was fitted with three electrically-actuated dive brakes ahead of each landing flap. In comparison to the He 118, the airframe was both lighter and smaller as well as being more aerodynamically efficient. It was furnished with retractable undercarriage, the main wheels and legs of which retracted forward of the main spar.

The aircraft, which featured all-metal construction, was typically flown a crew of two, a pilot and a navigator/radio-operator/gunner, which were seated under a lengthy glazed canopy that provided good all-round visibility. On bomber versions of the aircraft, the pilot was provided with a telescopic bombsight. As originally designed, the aircraft was powered by a single Aichi Atsuta liquid-cooled inverted V12 engine, a licensed copy of the German Daimler-Benz DB 601, which was rated to produce up to 895 kW (1,200 hp). The radiator was located behind and below the three-blade propeller, akin to the Curtiss P-40 Warhawk.

The aircraft had a relatively slender fuselage, which enabled it to reach high speeds during horizontal flight and in dives. Furthermore, it possessed excellent maneuverability despite a relatively high wing loading for the era; the Suisei had superior performance to several contemporary dive bombers, including the US Navy's Curtiss SB2C Helldiver. In order to conform with the IJN's long distance requirement, weight was minimized by not fitting the D4Y with self-sealing fuel tanks or armour. Subsequently, the D4Y was extremely vulnerable to enemy fire and prone to catching alight when struck.

Bombs were fitted under the wings and in an internal fuselage bomb bay; it usually carried one 500 kg (1,100 lb) bomb but there were reports that the D4Y sometimes carried two 250 kg (550 lb) bombs. It was also armed with a pair of 7.7 mm (.303 in) Type 97 aircraft machine guns in the nose and a 7.92 mm (.312 in) Type 1 machine gun – selected for its high rate of fire – in the rear of the cockpit. This rear gun was late replaced by a 13 mm (.51 in) Type 2 machine gun. This armament was typical for Japanese carrier-based dive-bombers, unlike "carrier attack bombers" (torpedo bombers) like the Nakajima B5N and B6N, which were not given forward-firing armament until the late-war Aichi B7A, which was expected to serve as both a dive-bomber and torpedo-bomber and was given a pair of 20mm Type 99-2 cannon. The forward machine guns were retained in the kamikaze version.

=== Into flight ===
The first (of five) prototypes was complete in November 1940 and made its maiden flight in December 1940. Early flight testing demonstrated its performance being in excess of the IJN's most optimistic expectations for the type, accompanied by largely favourable handling characteristics. However, as flight testing advanced to simulated diving bombing runs, the early prototypes revealed several shortcomings, including cracks appearing on the wing spars as well as instances of wing flutter, both of which were considered to be fatal flaws for any aircraft, but particularly one intended to routinely perform dive bombing. Accordingly, this discovery disrupted mass production plans for the type, and engineers from multiple aircraft companies were tasked with its resolution.

Instead of delaying production until the flutter issue could be fully resolved, the IJN instructed Aichi to configure early production aircraft to be use as reconnaissance aircraft, designated D4Y1-C. Modifications included the installation of a K-8 camera within the rear fuselage, and commonly being fitted with a pair of drop tanks; the reconnaissance mission profile took advantage of the D4Y's high speed and long range capabilities while not over-stressing the airframe. Accordingly, in July 1942, the D4Y1-C was ordered into production as the Navy Type 2 Carrier Reconnaissance Plane Model 11; it was only produced in small numbers due to niche requirements for specialised carrier-borne long distance reconnaissance.

Throughout 1942, development of the D4Y1 continued, leading to it being fitted with reinforced wing spars and improved dive brakes. In March 1943, by which point the aircraft's structural problems were considered to have finally been resolved and increasing losses were being incurred by the D3A, the IJN accepted the D4Y1 as a dive bomber, authorising production as the Suisei (Comet) Carrier Bomber Model 11. Thereafter, production of the type ramped quickly in response to the service's demand for dive bombers. Although the D4Y could operate from the large fleet carriers that formed the core of the Combined Fleet at the start of the conflict, it had problems operating from the smaller and slower carriers such as the Hiyō class, which formed a large proportion of Japan's carrier fleet after the losses of the Battle of Midway. Accordingly, catapult equipment was fitted, giving rise to the D4Y1 Kai (or improved) model.

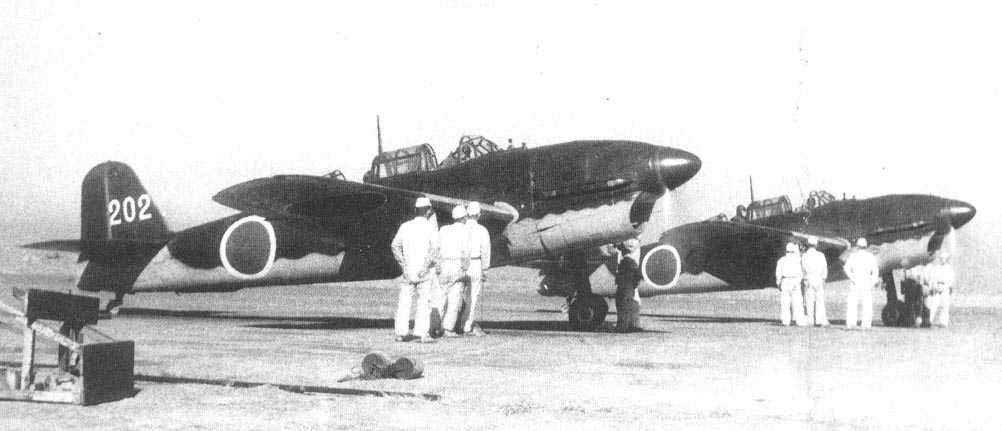
Yokosuka D4Y1 before takeoff

Early versions of the D4Y proved to be difficult to keep operational largely on account of its Atsuta engines being unreliable in front-line service. From early on in development, some figures had argued that the D4Y should be powered by an air-cooled radial engine, which Japanese engineers and maintenance crew had experience with and trusted. Accordingly, the aircraft was re-engined with the reliable Mitsubishi MK8P Kinsei 62, a 14-cylinder radial engine, as the Yokosuka D4Y3 Model 33. Although the new engine improved ceiling and rate of climb to over 10,000 m (33,000 ft) and climb to 3,000 m (9,800 ft) in 4.5 minutes instead of 9,400 m (30,800 ft) and 5 minutes, the higher fuel consumption resulted in reduced range and cruising speed, and the engine obstructed the forward and downward view of the pilot, hampering carrier operations. These problems were tolerated because of the increased availability of the new variant.

The final version of the aircraft was the D4Y4 Special Strike Bomber, a twin-seat special attack aircraft, (Note: Many sources claimed it was a single-seat kamikaze aircraft even though contemporary photos contradict this claim.) capable of carrying one 800 kg (1,800 lb) bomb, which was put into production in February 1945. It was equipped with three rocket boosters for terminal dive acceleration. This aircraft was an almost ideal kamikaze model: it had a combination of speed (560 km/h/350 mph), range (2,500 km/1,550 mi) and payload (800 kg/1,760 lb) probably not matched by any other Japanese aircraft.

The D4Y5 Model 54 was a planned version designed in 1945. It was to be powered by the Nakajima NK9C Homare 12 radial engine rated at 1,361 kW (1,825 hp), a new four-blade metal propeller of the constant-speed type and additional armour for both the crew and fuel tanks.

Ultimately, 2,038 D4Ys across all variants were completed, the majority of which were produced by Aichi Kokuki.

== Operational history ==
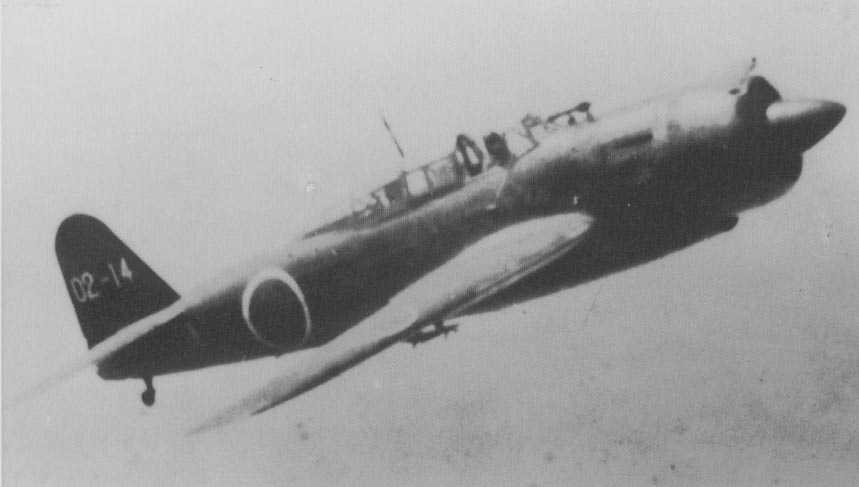
Yokosuka D4Y3 Model 33 "Suisei" in flight

The D4Y1-C reconnaissance aircraft entered service in mid-1942, when two of these aircraft were deployed aboard Sōryū at the Battle of Midway, one of which was lost when Sōryū was bombed. The other had been launched on a scouting mission and returned to Hiryū; it was then lost when Hiryū was bombed.

The D4Y was operated from the following Japanese aircraft carriers: Junyō, Shōkaku, Sōryū, Taihō, and Zuikaku.

Lacking armor and self-sealing fuel tanks, the Suiseis did not fare well against Allied fighters. They did, however, cause considerable damage to ships, including the carrier USS Franklin which was nearly sunk by an assumed single D4Y and the light carrier USS Princeton which was sunk by a single D4Y.

=== Marianas ===
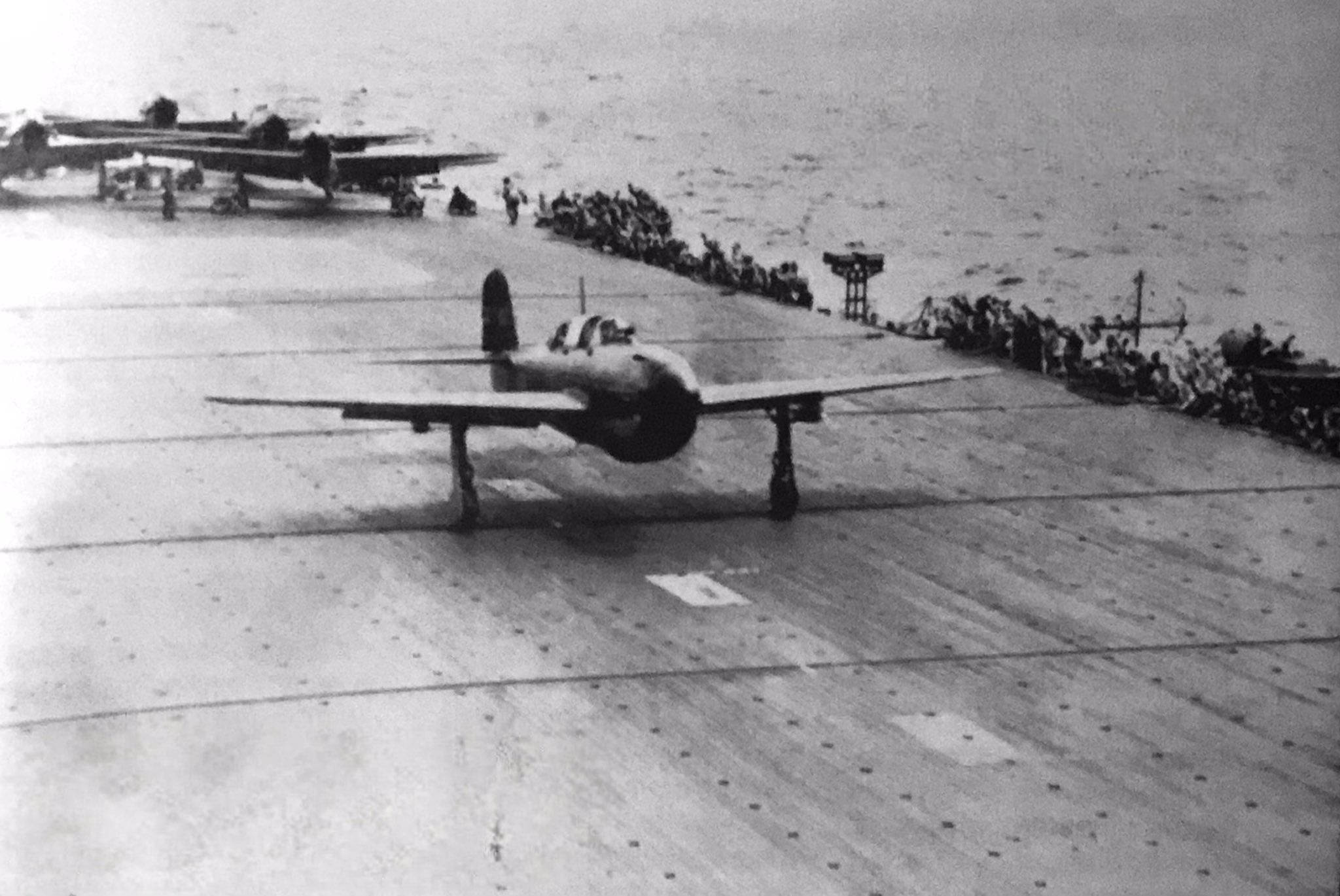
Yokosuka D4Y1 "Judy" of the 652nd Kōkūtai takes off from the aircraft carrier Jun'yō, to attack the US fleet during the Battle of Philippine Sea, 19 June 1944.

During the Battle of the Marianas, a total of 174 D4Ys of various models, including 33 D4Y1-Cs, were sortied from nine carriers to ward off an impending Allied amphibious attack, but were intercepted U.S. Navy fighters prior to reaching their target. Not only did the strike force fail to sink a single US carrier, but the type was shot down in large numbers during this engagement. While the D4Y was faster than the Grumman F4F Wildcat, it could not outrun the newer Grumman F6F Hellcat, which entered combat in September 1943. Thus, while the type was adequate for 1943, but rapid advances in Allied materiel in 1944 (among them, the introduction in large numbers of the Essex-class aircraft carrier) left the Japanese behind. A key disadvantage of both the IJN and the D4Y proved to be numerical inferiority as the conflict progressed.

One D4Y was claimed to have damaged the battleship USS South Dakota.

=== Leyte and Philippines ===
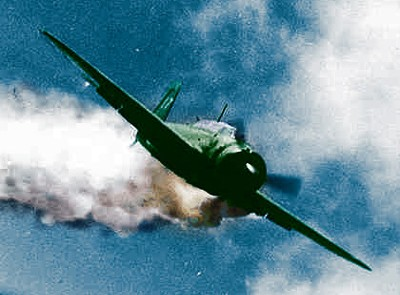
Lt. Yoshinori Yamaguchi's D4Y3 in the suicide dive against USS Essex, 1256 hours, 25 November 1944. Air brake flaps are extended, the burning port wing tank is trailing smoke. The lack of self-sealing fuel tanks made the D4Y easy to ignite with a few rounds of incendiary tracers, so a stricken Suisei often developed a fiery tail reminiscent of its namesake. Note white "17" on the vertical tail fin.

During the Philippines campaign, various models of the D4Y2 suffered heavy losses caused by large numbers of Allied fighters. Specifically, the US's Task Force 58 struck airfields across the Philippines to destroy the Japanese land-based aircraft prior to engaging IJN naval aircraft. The resulting engagement was referred to by the Americans as the "The Great Marianas Turkey Shoot", during which 400 Japanese aircraft were shot down in a single day. A single Hellcat pilot, Lieutenant Alexander Vraciu, shot down six D4Ys within a few minutes.

The D4Y was relegated to land operations where both the liquid-cooled engine D4Y2, and the radial engine D4Y3 fought against the U.S. fleet, scoring some successes. An unseen D4Y bombed and sank the Princeton on 24 October 1944. D4Ys hit other carriers as well, by both conventional attacks and kamikaze actions. In the Philippines air battles, the Japanese used kamikazes for the first time, and they scored heavily. D4Ys from 761 Kōkūtai may have hit the escort carrier USS Kalinin Bay on 25 October 1944, and the next day, USS Suwannee. Both were badly damaged, especially Suwannee, with heavy casualties and many aircraft destroyed. A month later on 25 November, USS Essex, Hancock, Intrepid and Cabot were hit by kamikazes, almost exclusively A6M Zero fighters and D4Ys, with much more damage. D4Ys also made conventional attacks. All these D4Ys were from 601 and 653 Kōkūtai.

=== In defense of the homeland ===
In March 1945, Task Force 58 approached southern Japan to strike military objectives in support of the invasion of Okinawa. The Japanese responded with massive kamikaze attacks, codenamed Kikusui, in which large numbers of D4Ys were used. A dedicated kamikaze version of the D4Y3, the D4Y4, with a non-detachable 800 kg bomb attached in a semi-recessed manner, was developed. The Japanese had begun installing rocket boosters on some Kamikazes, including the D4Y4, in order to increase speed near the target. As the D4Y4 was virtually identical in the air to the D4Y3, it was difficult to determine the sorties of each type.

The carriers USS Enterprise and Yorktown were damaged by D4Ys of 701 Wing on 18 March. On 19 March, the carrier USS Franklin was hit with two bombs from a single D4Y. Franklin was so heavily damaged that she was retired until the end of the war. Another D4Y hit the carrier USS Wasp.

On 12 April 1945, another D4Y, part of Kikusui mission N.2, struck Enterprise, causing some damage.

During Kikusui N.6, on 11 May 1945, USS Bunker Hill was hit and put out of action by two kamikazes that some sources identify as D4Ys. This was the third Essex-class carrier forced to retire to the United States to repair.

=== Night fighter ===
The D4Y was faster than the A6M Zero, and some were employed as D4Y2-S night fighters against Boeing B-29 Superfortress bombers late in the War. The night fighter conversions were made at the 11th Naval Aviation Arsenal at Hiro. Each D4Y2-S had its bombing systems and equipment removed and replaced by a 20 mm Type 99 cannon installed in the rear cockpit, with the barrel slanted up and forwards in a similar manner to the German Schräge Musik armament fitting (pioneered by the IJNAS in May 1943 on the Nakajima J1N). Some examples also carried two or four 10 cm air-to-air rockets under the wings; lack of radar for night interceptions, inadequate climb rate and the B-29's high ceiling limited the D4Y2-S effectiveness as a night fighter. Little is known of their operations.

=== Last action ===
At the end of the conflict, D4Ys were still being used operationally against the U.S. Navy. Among the last of these were eleven aircraft led by Vice Admiral Matome Ugaki on a suicide mission on 15 August 1945, of which all but three were lost.

== Operators ==
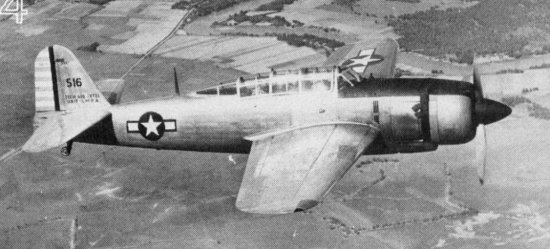
A D4Y3 (Type 33) at NAS Anacostia is tested by U.S. Navy personnel of the Technical Air Intelligence Center after the war.

Japan

- Imperial Japanese Navy Air Service
- Aircraft carrier
  - Sōryū, equipped prototype #2 and #3.
  - Shōkaku, supplied from 601st Kōkūtai.
  - Zuikaku, supplied from 601st Kōkūtai.
  - Taihō, supplied from 601st Kōkūtai.
  - Jun'yō, supplied from 652nd Kōkūtai.
- Battleship
  - Ise, supplied from 634th Kōkūtai.
  - Hyūga, supplied from 634th Kōkūtai.
- Naval Air Group
  - Himeji Kōkūtai
  - Hyakurihara Kōkūtai
  - Kaikō Kōkūtai
  - Kanoya Kōkūtai
  - Kantō Kōkūtai
  - Kinki Kōkūtai
  - Kyūshū Kōkūtai
  - Nagoya Kōkūtai
  - Nansei-Shotō Kōkūtai
  - Ōryū Kōkūtai
  - Tainan Kōkūtai
  - Taiwan Kōkūtai
  - Tōkai Kōkūtai
  - Tsuiki Kōkūtai
  - Yokosuka Kōkūtai
  - 12th Kōkūtai
  - 121st Kōkūtai
  - 131st Kōkūtai
  - 132nd Kōkūtai
  - 141st Kōkūtai
  - 151st Kōkūtai
  - 153rd Kōkūtai
  - 201st Kōkūtai
  - 210th Kōkūtai
  - 252nd Kōkūtai
  - 302nd Kōkūtai
  - 352nd Kōkūtai
  - 501st Kōkūtai
  - 502nd Kōkūtai
  - 503rd Kōkūtai
  - 521st Kōkūtai
  - 523rd Kōkūtai
  - 531st Kōkūtai
  - 541st Kōkūtai
  - 552nd Kōkūtai
  - 553rd Kōkūtai
  - 601st Kōkūtai
  - 634th Kōkūtai
  - 652nd Kōkūtai
  - 653rd Kōkūtai
  - 701st Kōkūtai
  - 721st Kōkūtai
  - 722nd Kōkūtai
  - 752nd Kōkūtai
  - 761st Kōkūtai
  - 762nd Kōkūtai
  - 763rd Kōkūtai
  - 765th Kōkūtai
  - 901st Kōkūtai
  - 951st Kōkūtai
  - 1001st Kōkūtai
  - 1081st Kōkūtai
- Aerial Squadron
  - Reconnaissance 3rd Hikōtai
  - Reconnaissance 4th Hikōtai
  - Reconnaissance 61st Hikōtai
  - Reconnaissance 101st Hikōtai
  - Reconnaissance 102nd Hikōtai
  - Attack 1st Hikōtai
  - Attack 3rd Hikōtai
  - Attack 5th Hikōtai
  - Attack 102nd Hikōtai
  - Attack 103rd Hikōtai
  - Attack 105th Hikōtai
  - Attack 107th Hikōtai
  - Attack 161st Hikōtai
  - Attack 251st Hikōtai
  - Attack 263rd Hikōtai
- Kamikaze
  - Chūyū group (picked from Attack 5th Hikōtai)
  - Giretsu group (picked from Attack 5th Hikōtai)
  - Kasuga group (picked from Attack 5th Hikōtai)
  - Chihaya group (picked from 201st Kōkūtai)
  - Katori group (picked from Attack 3rd Hikōtai)
  - Kongō group No. 6 (picked from 201st Kōkūtai)
  - Kongō group No. 9 (picked from 201st Kōkūtai)
  - Kongō group No. 11 (picked from 201st Kōkūtai)
  - Kongō group No. 23 (picked from 201st Kōkūtai)
  - Kyokujitsu group (picked from Attack 102nd Hikōtai)
  - Suisei group (picked from Attack 105th Hikōtai)
  - Yamato group (picked from Attack 105th Hikōtai)
  - Kikusui-Suisei group (picked from Attack 103rd Hikōtai and Attack 105th Hikōtai)
  - Kikusui-Suisei group No. 2 (picked from Attack 103rd Hikōtai and Attack 105th Hikōtai)
  - Koroku-Suisei group (picked from Attack 103rd Hikōtai)
  - Chūsei group (picked from 252nd Kōkūtai and Attack 102nd Hikōtai)
  - Mitate group No. 3 (picked from Attack 1st Hikōtai and Attack 3rd Hikōtai)
  - Mitate group No. 4 (picked from Attack 1st Hikōtai)
  - 210th group (picked from 210th Kōkūtai)
  - Niitaka group (picked from Attack 102nd Hikōtai)
  - Yūbu group (picked from Attack 102nd Hikōtai)

United States

- United States Navy operated captured aircraft for evaluation purposes.

== Variants ==
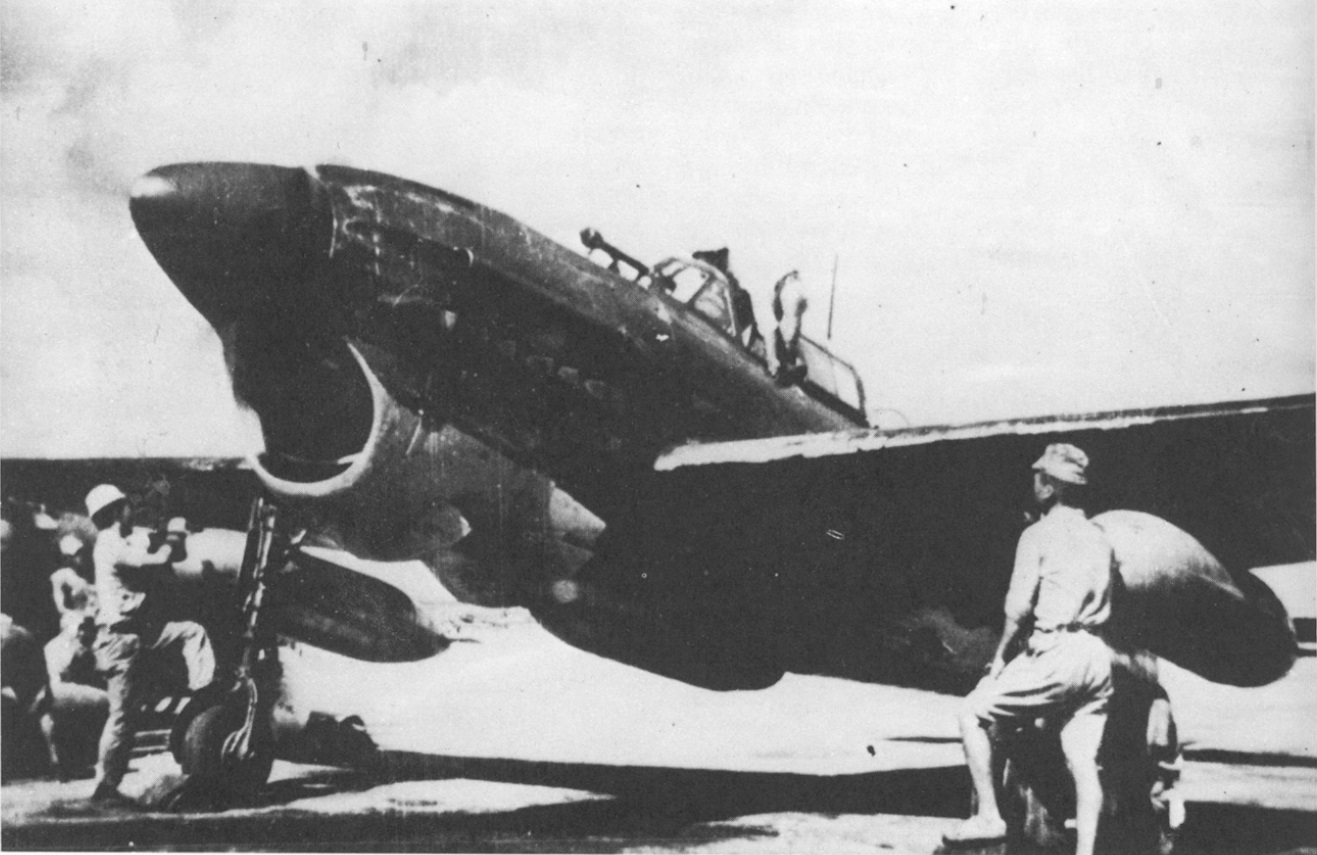
D4Y1-C preparing for takeoff in Mariana Islands, 1944

D4Y1 Experimental Number 13 carrier dive-bomber (十三試艦上爆撃機, 13-Shi Kanjō Bakugekiki)
5 prototypes were produced. #2 and #3 were rebuilt to reconnaissance plane and carried on aircraft carrier Sōryū, and used the Battle of Midway. #4 was rebuilt to reconnaissance plane also, and carried on aircraft carrier Shōkaku, and used in the Battle of the Santa Cruz Islands.

D4Y1-C Type 2 reconnaissance aircraft Model 11 (二式艦上偵察機一一型, Nishiki Kanjō Teisatsuki 11-Gata)
Reconnaissance version produced at Aichi's Nagoya factory. Developed on 7 July 1942.
D4Y1 Suisei Model 11 (彗星一一型, Suisei 11-Gata)
First batch of serial produced dive bomber aircraft. Powered by 895 kW (1,200 hp) Aichi AE1A Atsuta 12 engine. Developed in December 1943.
D4Y1 Kai Suisei Model 21 (彗星二一型, Suisei 21-Gata)
D4Y1 with catapult equipment for battleship Ise and Hyūga. Developed on 17 March 1944.

D4Y2 Suisei Model 12 (彗星一二型, Suisei 12-Gata)
1,044 kW (1,400 hp) Aichi AE1P Atsuta 32 engine adopted. Developed in October 1944.

D4Y2a Suisei Model 12A (彗星一二甲型, Suisei 12 Kō-Gata)
D4Y2 with the rear cockpit 13 mm (0.51 in) machine gun. Developed in November 1944.
D4Y2-S Suisei Model 12E (彗星一二戊型, Suisei 12 Bo-Gata)
Night fighter version of the D4Y2 with bomb equipment removed and a 20 mm (0.79 in) upward-firing oblic cannon installed.
D4Y2 Kai Suisei Model 22 (彗星二二型, Suisei 22-Gata)
D4Y2 with catapult equipment for battleships Ise and Hyūga.
D4Y2a Kai Suisei Model 22A (彗星二二甲型, Suisei 22 Kō-Gata)
D4Y2 Kai with the rear cockpit 13 mm (0.51 in) machine gun.
D4Y2-R Type 2 reconnaissance aircraft Model 12 (二式艦上偵察機一二型, Nishiki Kanjō Teisatsuki 12-Gata)
Land-based Reconnaissance version of the D4Y2. Developed in October 1944.
D4Y2-Ra Type 2 reconnaissance aircraft Model 12A (二式艦上偵察機一二甲型, Nishiki Kanjō Teisatsuki 12 Kō-Gata)
D4Y2-R with the rear cockpit 13 mm (0.51 in) machine gun.

D4Y3 Suisei Model 33 (彗星三三型, Suisei 33-Gata)
Land-based bomber variant. 1,163 kW (1,560 hp) Mitsubishi Kinsei 62 radial engine adopted. Early production aircraft retained their tailhook, but was later removed.

D4Y3a Suisei Model 33A (彗星三三甲型, Suisei 33 Kō-Gata)
D4Y3 with the rear cockpit 13 mm (0.51 in) machine gun.
Suisei Model 33 Night-fighter variant (彗星三三型改造夜戦, Suisei 33-Gata Kaizō yasen)
Temporary rebuilt night-fighter version. Two planes were converted from D4Y3. Equipment a 20 mm (0.79 in) upward-firing oblic cannon installed. This was not naval regulation equipment. Development code D4Y3-S (or Suisei Model 33E) was not used in the IJN official documents.

D4Y4 Suisei Model 43 (彗星四三型, Suisei 43-Gata)
Final production variant. Bomb load increased to 800 kg (1,800 lb) with the main bomb semi-recessed in the bomb bay. It had 75 mm (3.0 in) bullet-proof glass in front of the canopy, plus 5 mm and 9 mm thick armor plates fore and aft of the cockpit. The fuel tanks were also given added protection, and the movable rear machine gun was removed. The addition of five RATO boosters was considered: three in the lower-bottom part of the fuselage and two on both sides below the engine. Late production aircraft (after April 1945) had their Type 97 machine guns and bomb ejector removed entirely. Generally, the D4Y4 is often recognized as being purpose-built for special attack operations.
Suisei Model 54 (彗星五四型, Suisei 54-Gata)
Planned version with Nakajima Homare radial engine, four-blade propeller, and more armor protection.

== Surviving aircraft ==
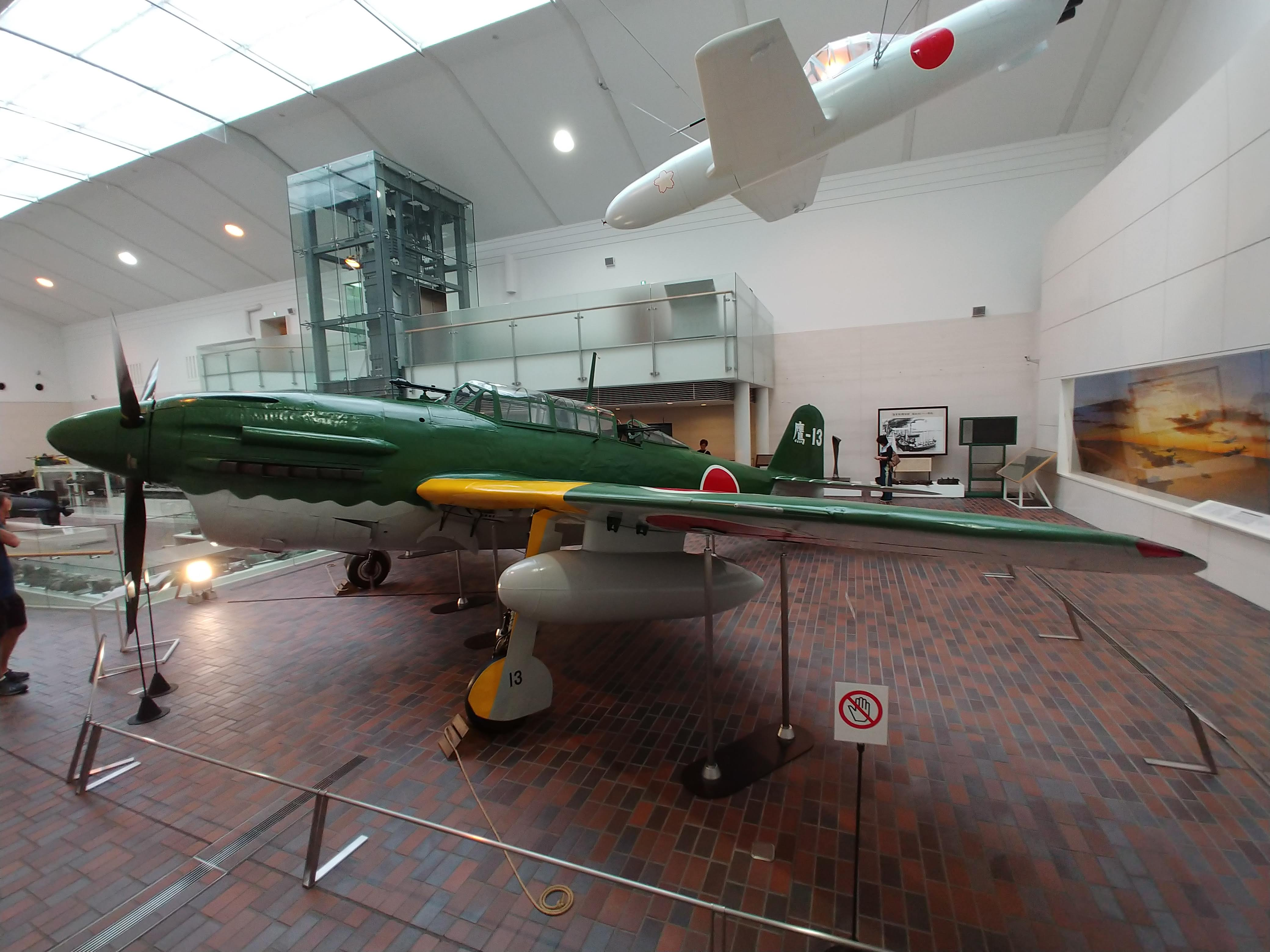
Yokosuka D4Y1 (serial 4316) at the Yūshūkan War Museum

In 1988, a restored D4Y1 (serial 4316) was donated to the Yasukuni Shrine Yūshūkan Museum in Tokyo, where it remains on display. The wreck was recovered from Colonia Airfield on Yap Island and restored at Kisarazu Air Field from 1979 to 1980.

An engineless D4Y2 was recovered from Babo Airfield, Indonesia in 1991. It was acquired and restored to non-flying status by the Planes of Fame Air Museum in Chino, California. It was restored to represent a radial engined D4Y3, using an American Pratt & Whitney R-1830 engine. The engine is in running condition and can be started to demonstrate ground running and taxiing of the aircraft.

== Specifications (D4Y2) ==
Yokosuka D4Y-4 3-view drawing

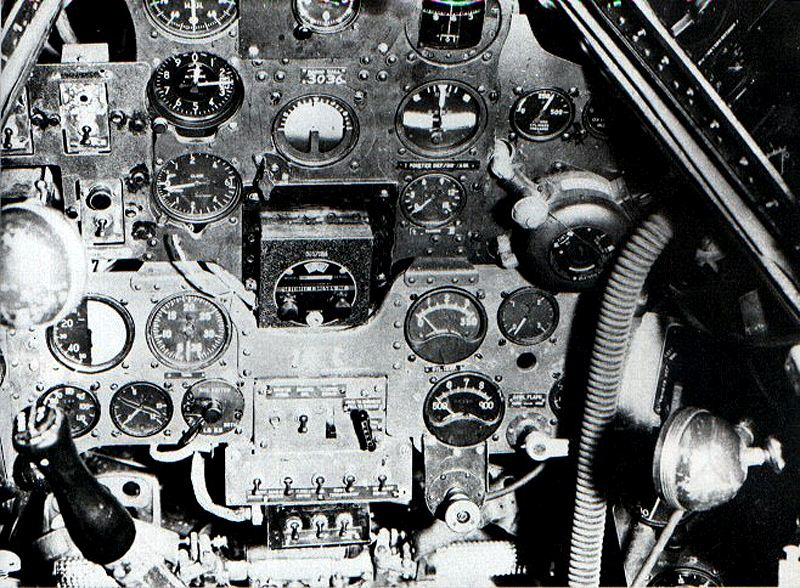
Instrument panel of a Yokosuka D4Y4

Data from The Encyclopedia of World Aircraft, Japanese Aircraft of the Pacific War

General characteristics

- Crew: 2
- Length: 10.22 m (33 ft 6 in)
- Wingspan: 11.5 m (37 ft 9 in)
- Height: 3.74 m (12 ft 3 in)
- Wing area: 23.6 m^{2} (254 sq ft)
- Empty weight: 2,440 kg (5,379 lb)
- Gross weight: 4,250 kg (9,370 lb)
- Powerplant: 1 × Aichi Atsuta AE1P 32 V-12 inverted liquid-cooled piston engine, 1,000 kW (1,400 hp)

Performance

- Maximum speed: 550 km/h (340 mph, 300 kn)
- Range: 1,465 km (910 mi, 791 nmi)
- Service ceiling: 10,700 m (35,100 ft)
- Rate of climb: 14 m/s (2,800 ft/min)
- Wing loading: 180 kg/m^{2} (37 lb/sq ft)
- Power/mass: 0.25 kW/kg (0.15 hp/lb)

Armament

- Guns:

- 2× forward-firing 7.7 mm Type 97 aircraft machine guns
- 1× rearward-firing 7.92 mm Type 1 machine gun

- Bombs:

- 500 kg (1,100 lb) of bombs (design)
- 800 kg (1,800 lb) of bombs (suicide attacker)

== See also ==
Aircraft of comparable role, configuration, and era

- Aichi D3A
- Blackburn Skua
- Breda Ba.65
- Curtiss SB2C Helldiver
- Douglas SBD Dauntless
- Vultee Vengeance

Related lists

- List of aircraft of World War II
- List of military aircraft of Japan
