= Nakajima B6N Tenzan =

1941 torpedo bomber family by Nakajima

B6N Tenzan
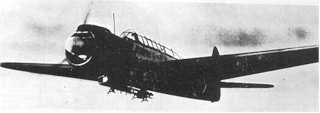
- B6N2 in flight

General information
- Type: Torpedo bomber
- National origin: Japan
- Manufacturer: Nakajima Aircraft Company
- Primary user: Imperial Japanese Navy
- Number built: 1,268

History
- Introduction date: August 1943
- First flight: 14 March 1941
- Retired: 1945

The Nakajima B6N Tenzan (天山, Heavenly Mountain) (Allied reporting name: "Jill") was the Imperial Japanese Navy's standard carrier-borne torpedo bomber during the final years of World War II and the successor to the Nakajima B5N. Due to its protracted development, a shortage of experienced pilots and the United States Navy's achievement of air superiority by the time of its introduction, the B6N was never able to fully demonstrate its combat potential.

== Design and development ==
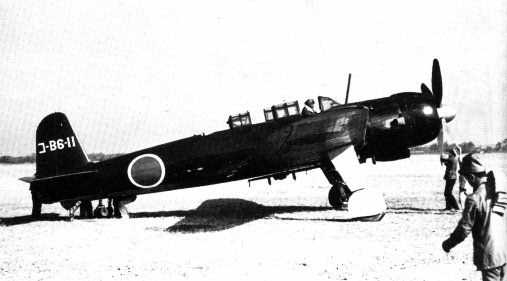
A B6N2 before starting the engine.

The B5N carrier-based torpedo bomber's weaknesses had shown themselves early in the Second Sino-Japanese War; as well as updating that aircraft, the Imperial Japanese Navy began seeking a faster, longer-ranged replacement. In December 1939 it issued a specification to Nakajima for a Navy Experimental 14-Shi Carrier Attack Aircraft capable of carrying the same external weapons load as the B5N. The new plane was to carry a crew of three (pilot, navigator/bombardier and radio operator/gunner) and be of low wing, cantilevered, all-metal construction (though control surfaces were fabric-covered). Further requirements included a top speed of 250 knots (460 km/h; 290 mph), a cruising speed of 200 knots (370 km/h; 230 mph) and a range of 1,000 nmi (1,900 km; 1,200 mi) with an 800 kg (1,800 lb) bomb load or 2,072 nmi (3,837 km; 2,384 mi) without external armament.

The Navy had requested installation of the proven Mitsubishi Kasei engine as the B6N's powerplant but Engineer Kenichi Matsumara insisted on using Nakajima's new 1,870 hp (1,390 kW) Mamoru 11 14-cylinder air-cooled radial due to its lower fuel consumption and greater adaptability. This became an unfortunate choice as the Mamoru engine was plagued with mechanical defects and never achieved its expected power rating.

Constrained by the standard-sized aircraft elevators then in use on most Japanese carriers, designer Matsumara was obliged to use a wing similar in span and area as that of the B5N and to limit the aircraft's overall length to 11 m (36 ft). This latter restriction accounted for the B6N's distinctive swept-forward tail fin and rudder. The outer wing panels folded upward hydraulically, reducing the B6N's overall span from 14.9 m (49 ft) to approximately 6.3 m (21 ft) for minimal carrier stowage. In order to lessen increased wingloading due to the heavier powerplant, Fowler flaps were installed which could be extended beyond the wing's trailing edge. These were normally lowered to an angle of 20 degrees during take-off and 38 degrees when landing. Despite the use of these flaps, however, the B6N had a much higher stall speed than its predecessor.

The prototype B6N1 made its maiden flight on 14 March 1941. Following continued testing, however, several problems became evident. In particular, the aircraft exhibited an alarming tendency to roll while in flight, the cause of which was traced to the extreme torque developed by the four-bladed propeller. To compensate, the aircraft's tail fin was thinned down and moved 2 degrees ten minutes to port. This modification greatly improved the plane's handling characteristics.

The B6N1's Mamoru 11 engine was found prone to severe vibrations and overheating at certain speeds and was at first judged too unreliable, an important consideration given that the plane was expected to fly long distances over open water. Following a series of modifications, though, the engine's performance was finally deemed promising enough that carrier acceptance trials were begun at the end of 1942. Subsequent test flights conducted aboard the carriers Ryuho and Zuikaku indicated the need to strengthen the tail hook mounting on the plane's fuselage. Some attempts were also made to use RATOG (rocket-assisted take-off gear) units on several B6N1s in order to qualify the aircraft for use on smaller carriers but the results were unsatisfactory.

The B6N1 was officially approved for production status in early 1943 and given the designation Navy Carrier Attack Aircraft Tenzan Model 11. Modifications based on testing of the initial prototypes included: the addition of a flexible Type 92 machine gun in a ventral tunnel at the rear of the cockpit (in addition to the standard rear-firing Type 92), and a 7.7mm Type 97 machine-gun to the port wing (the latter was eventually deleted after the seventieth production aircraft); angling the torpedo mounting rack 2 degrees downward and adding torpedo stabilization plates to prevent the torpedo from bouncing off the water during low-altitude release; strengthening of the main landing gear. A proposal by the designers to replace the B6N1's unprotected fuel tanks with self-sealing ones would have resulted in a 30% drop in fuel capacity, a loss in range the Navy decided was unacceptable.

After only 133 B6N1s had been produced by July 1943, the Japanese Ministry of Munitions ordered Nakajima to halt manufacture of the Mamoru 11 engine in order that the Navy reduce the number of different engines then in use. Pending availability of the 18-cylinder Nakajima Homare engine, Nakajima was asked to substitute the 1,850 hp (1,380 kW) Mitsubishi MK4T Kasei 25 engine on the B6N1 airframe, the very engine the Navy had originally requested them to use. As the Mamoru 11 and Kasei 25 were similar in size, installation was relatively straightforward, requiring only that the nose be extended to maintain the aircraft's center of gravity and minor alterations to the oil cooler and air intakes on the engine cowling. A smaller 3.4 m (11 ft) diameter four-bladed propeller and shorter spinner were also installed at this time, resulting in a small weight-savings, and the retractable tailwheel was fixed permanently in the down position. Finally, the single exhaust stacks on either side of the engine cowling were replaced with multiple smaller stubs to reduce glare at night and to supply a minor amount of forward thrust. The resulting modification was designated Navy Carrier Attack Aircraft Tenzan Model 12 or B6N2.

Starting in the fall of 1943, one of every three B6N2s manufactured was equipped with 3-Shiki Type 3 air-to-surface radar for detecting enemy ships. Yagi antennas were installed along the wing leading edges and also protruded from the sides of the rear fuselage.

A final version of the aircraft, designated B6N3 Model 13, was planned for land-based use as, by this point in the war, all of Japan's large carriers had been sunk and those few smaller ones remaining lacked catapults for launching heavier carrier-borne aircraft like the B6N. Changes included installation of a Kasei Model 25c engine, a more streamlined engine cowling and crew canopy, strengthening of the main landing gear, a retractable tail wheel and removal of the tail hook. Two B6N3 prototypes were completed but Japan surrendered before this variant could be put into production.

By war's end in August 1945, Nakajima had completed a total of 1,268 B6Ns (almost all of them B6N2s) at its plants in Okawa in the Gumma district and at Aichi in the Handa district. Production never exceeded more than 90 planes per month.

== Operational history ==
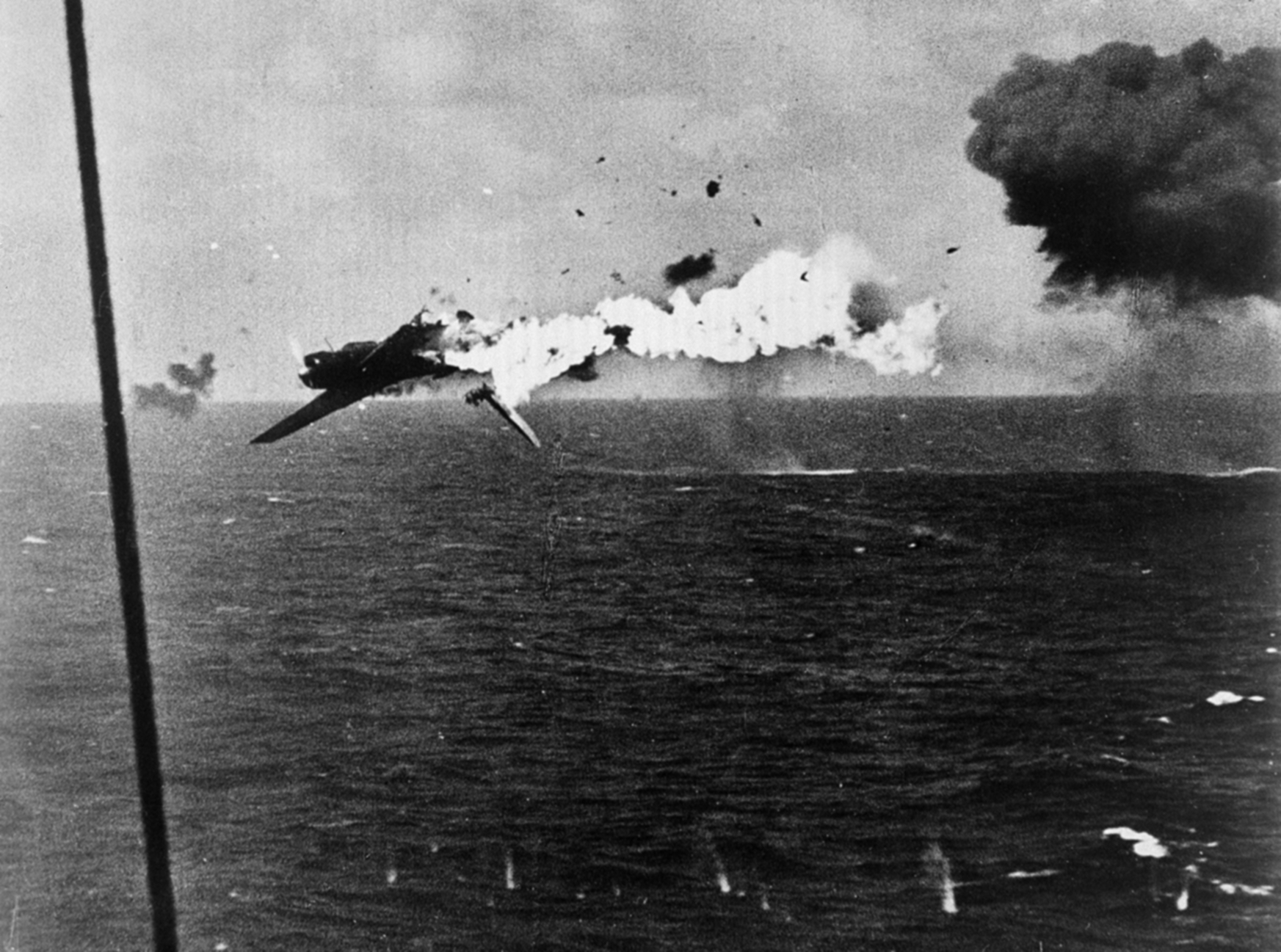
A B6N shot down while attacking USS Yorktown off Kwajalein on 4 December 1943. This was part of an attack made by six Tenzan bombers belonging to the 531st Kōkūtai

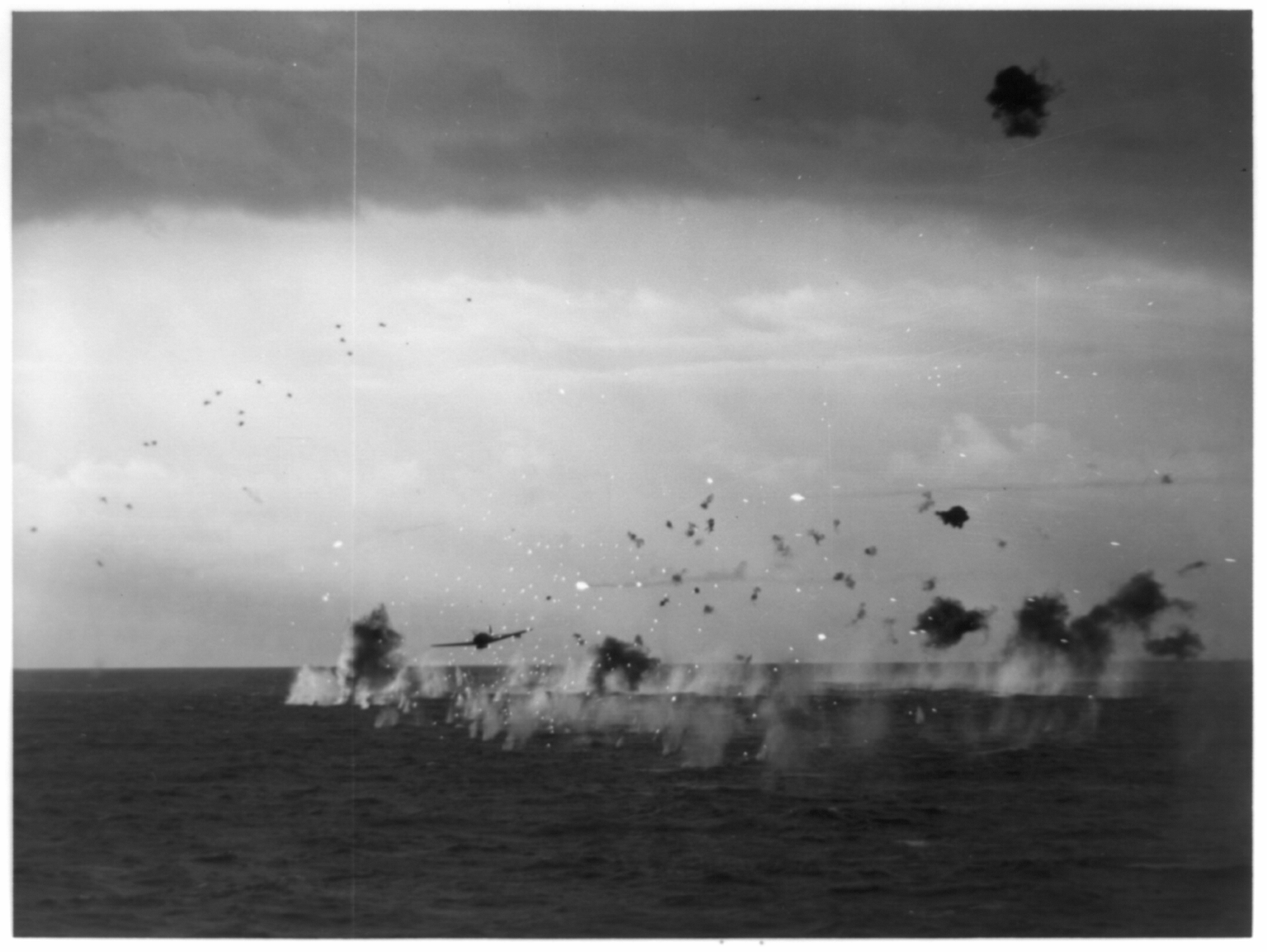
Tenzan bomber approaching very close to drop its torpedo while attacking USS Yorktown during the raid on Truk, Caroline Islands. 29 April 1944

The B6N Tenzan began reaching front-line units in August 1943 in small numbers. The intent was to gradually replace all of the B5N Kate torpedo bombers then operating aboard the carriers of the Third Fleet at Truk Atoll in the Caroline Islands. However, the B6Ns were prematurely committed to battle when increased Allied naval activity in the Solomon Islands indicated a likely invasion at Bougainville. In response to this threat, the IJN initiated Operation RO, in which the land-based air units at Rabaul were reinforced with nearly all carrier aircraft in the 1st carrier fleet, comprising 173 carrier aircraft from First Carrier Division (Zuikaku, Shokaku and Zuiho), including forty B6Ns. These aircraft were flown from Truk to Rabaul between 28 October and 1 November and participated in intense action until being flown back to Truk.

On 5 November fourteen B6N1s, escorted by four A6M Zero fighters, were sent to attack American shipping anchored off Bougainville. Four B6N1s were lost and no hits were scored, returning Japanese pilots claimed to have sunk one large and one medium carrier, two heavy cruisers and two other cruisers or large destroyers.

Additional attacks on 8 November and 11 November, suffered heavy losses, with only 52 of the original 173 planes from the First Carrier Division making it back to Truk on 13 November, among them, just six B6N1 Tenzans out of the forty committed.

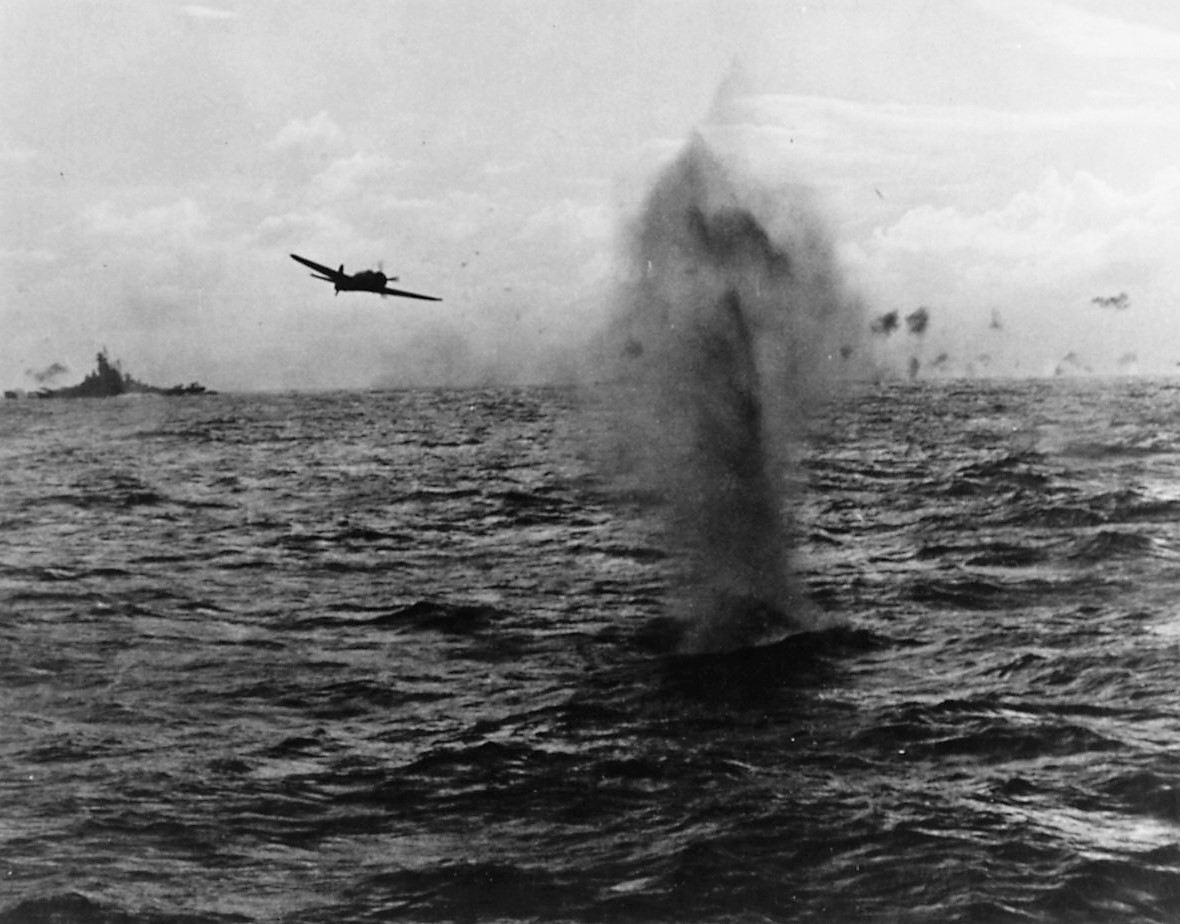
B6N torpedo bomber attacking TG 38.3 during the Formosa Air Battle, October 1944

On 19 June 1944, the B6N made its carrier-borne combat debut at The Battle of the Philippine Sea, operating in an environment where the U.S. Navy had virtually complete air superiority. Subsequently, it failed to inflict any damage whilst taking heavy losses from the U.S. Navy's new F6F Hellcat fighter.

By this point, small improvements in the B6N's performance were amongst the least of the Japanese Navy's problems. When the new model became available in mid-1944, Japan had already lost most of its large carriers and became desperately short of experienced pilots. Therefore, the vast majority of B6N2 operations took place from land bases and failed to achieve any major successes. The planes were extensively used in the Battle of Okinawa where they were also used for kamikaze missions for the first time.

== Variants ==
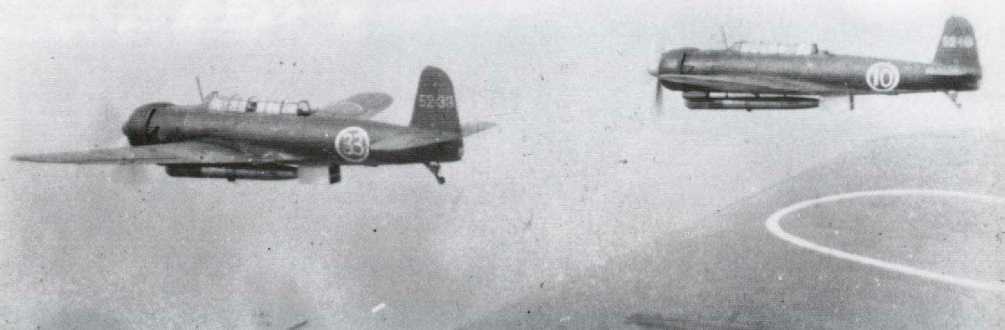
Nakajima B6N2 Tenzan as 752nd Kōkūtai flying in formation (note aircraft numbers on hinomaru).

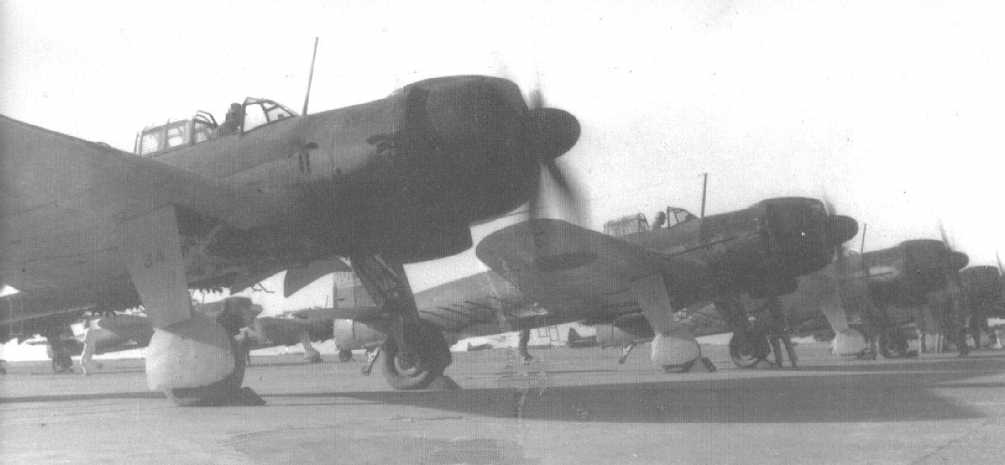
Nakajima B6N2 Tenzan unit before take-off.

- B6N1: Prototypes - Engine Nakajima NK7A Mamori 11 of 1,394 kW (1,870 hp), four-blade propeller. Two examples built.
- B6N1 Tenzan Navy Carrier Based-Attack Bomber, Model 11: First series model. 133 built (production number 1–133).
- B6N2 Model 12: Main production model, featured Mitsubishi MK4T Kasei 25 of 1,380 kW (1,850 hp). 256 built (production number 134–389).
- B6N2a Model 12A: Revised dorsal armament 7.7 mm (.303 in) Type 92 machine gun, replaced with one 13 mm Type 2 machine gun. Further revised ventral armament 7.7 mm Type 92 machine gun, replaced with one 7.92 mm (.312 in) Type 1 machine gun. 875 built (production number and after 390, however two plane converted to B6N3).
- B6N3 Model 13 Prototypes: Engine Mitsubishi MK4T-C Kasei 25c of 1,380 kW (1,850 hp). Modified landing gear for operating from land bases; two examples converted from B6N2a (production number 751–752).
- Total Production (all versions): 1,268 examples.

== Operators ==
Japan

- Imperial Japanese Navy
  - Aircraft carrier
    - Shōkaku
    - Zuikaku
    - Taihō
    - Jun'yō
    - Hiyō
    - Ryūhō
    - Chitose
    - Chiyoda
    - Zuihō
  - Naval Air Group
    - Himeji Kōkūtai
    - Hokutō Kōkūtai
    - Hyakurihara Kōkūtai
    - Kanoya Kōkūtai
    - Kushira Kōkūtai
    - Kyūshū Kōkūtai
    - Sunosaki Kōkūtai
    - Suzuka Kōkūtai
    - Taiwan Kōkūtai
    - Tateyama Kōkūtai
    - Taura Kōkūtai
    - Usa Kōkūtai
    - Yokosuka Kōkūtai
    - 131st Kōkūtai
    - 210th Kōkūtai
    - 331st Kōkūtai
    - 501st Kōkūtai
    - 531st Kōkūtai
    - 551st Kōkūtai
    - 553rd Kōkūtai
    - 582nd Kōkūtai
    - 601st Kōkūtai
    - 634th Kōkūtai
    - 652nd Kōkūtai
    - 653rd Kōkūtai
    - 701st Kōkūtai
    - 705th Kōkūtai
    - 752nd Kōkūtai
    - 761st Kōkūtai
    - 762nd Kōkūtai
    - 765th Kōkūtai
    - 901st Kōkūtai
    - 903rd Kōkūtai
    - 931st Kōkūtai
    - 951st Kōkūtai
    - 1001st Kōkūtai
  - Aerial Squadron
    - 251st Attack Hikōtai
    - 252nd Attack Hikōtai
    - 253rd Attack Hikōtai
    - 254th Attack Hikōtai
    - 256th Attack Hikōtai
    - 262nd Attack Hikōtai
    - 263rd Attack Hikōtai
  - Kamikaze
    - Kikusui-Tenzan group
    - Kikusui-Ten'ō group
    - Kikusui-Raiō group
    - Mitate group No. 2
    - Mitate group No. 3
    - Kiichi group

== Surviving aircraft ==
B6N2 c/n 5350 remains in existence and it is stored at the National Air and Space Museum's Paul E. Garber Preservation, Restoration, and Storage Facility in Suitland, Maryland. It is currently disassembled. It was formerly displayed intact at Naval Air Station Joint Reserve Base Willow Grove in Horsham Township, Pennsylvania until it was acquired by the National Air and Space Museum in 1981.

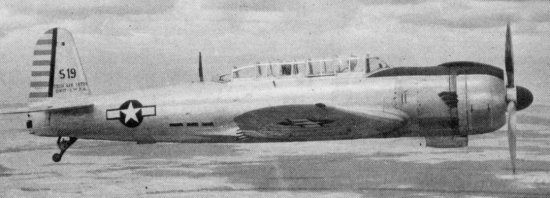
A B6N2 is tested by US Navy personnel of the TAIU-SWPA (Technical Air Intelligence Unit-South-West Pacific Area) over Clark Field, Luzon at the end of the war.

== Specifications (Nakajima B6N2) ==
Data from Japanese Aircraft of the Pacific War

General characteristics

- Crew: 3
- Length: 10.865 m (35 ft 8 in)
- Wingspan: 14.894 m (48 ft 10 in)
- Height: 3.8 m (12 ft 6 in)
- Wing area: 37.2 m^{2} (400 sq ft)
- Airfoil: root: K121; tip: K119
- Empty weight: 3,010 kg (6,636 lb)
- Gross weight: 5,200 kg (11,464 lb)
- Max takeoff weight: 5,650 kg (12,456 lb)
- Powerplant: 1 × Mitsubishi MK4T Kasei 25 14-cylinder air-cooled radial piston engine, 1,380 kW (1,850 hp) for take-off

1,253 kW (1,680 hp) at 2,100 m (6,900 ft)
1,148 kW (1,540 hp) at 5,500 m (18,000 ft)

- Propellers: 4-bladed constant-speed propeller

Performance

- Maximum speed: 482 km/h (300 mph, 260 kn) at 4,900 m (16,100 ft)
- Cruise speed: 333 km/h (207 mph, 180 kn) at 5,500 m (18,000 ft)
- Range: 1,746 km (1,085 mi, 943 nmi)
- Ferry range: 3,045 km (1,892 mi, 1,644 nmi)
- Service ceiling: 9,040 m (29,660 ft)
- Time to altitude: 5,000 m (16,000 ft) in 10 minutes 24 seconds
- Wing loading: 139.8 kg/m^{2} (28.6 lb/sq ft)
- Power/mass: 0.2652 kW/kg (0.1613 hp/lb)

Armament

- Guns: 1 × 7.7 mm (0.303 in) Type 92 machine gun in rear cockpit and 1 × 7.7 mm (0.303 in) Type 92 firing through ventral tunnel
- Bombs: 1 × 800 kg torpedo or 800 kg (1,760 lb) of bombs (1 x 800 kg or 500 kg, or 2 × 250 kg)

== See also ==
Related development

- Nakajima B5N

Aircraft of comparable role, configuration, and era

- Aichi B7A Ryusei
- Curtiss SB2C Helldiver
- Consolidated TBY Sea Wolf
- Fairey Barracuda
- Grumman TBF Avenger
- Junkers Ju 87D
- Supermarine Type 322
- Yokosuka D4Y Suisei

Related lists

- List of aircraft of World War II
- List of military aircraft of Japan
