= Japanese aircraft carrier Taihō =

Aircraft carrier of the Imperial Japanese Navy

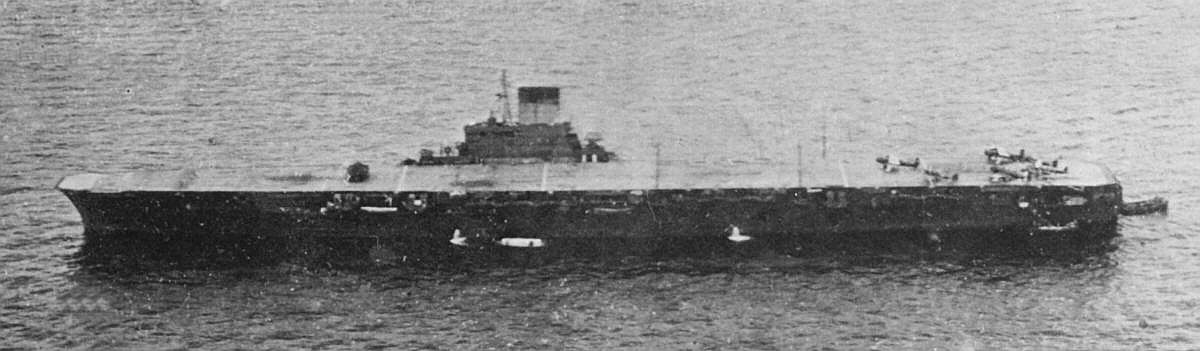

Class overview
- Name: Taihō (大鳳)
- Operators: Imperial Japanese Navy
- Preceded by: Shōkaku class
- Succeeded by: Unryū class
- Built: 1941–1944
- In commission: 7 March – 19 June 1944
- Completed: 1
- Lost: 1

History

Empire of Japan
- Name: Taihō
- Builder: Kawasaki Kobe Shipyard
- Laid down: 10 July 1941
- Launched: 7 April 1943
- Commissioned: 7 March 1944
- Stricken: August 1945
- Fate: Sunk in the Battle of the Philippine Sea, 19 June 1944

General characteristics
- Class & type: Taihō-class aircraft carrier
- Displacement: 29,770 long tons (30,248 t) (standard)
- Length: 260.6 m (855 ft 0 in)
- Beam: 27.4 m (89 ft 11 in)
- Draft: 9.6 m (31 ft 6 in)
- Installed power: 8 × water-tube boilers; 160,000 shp (120,000 kW)
- Propulsion: 4 × shafts; 4 × geared steam turbines
- Speed: 33.3 knots (61.7 km/h; 38.3 mph)
- Range: 10,000 nmi (19,000 km; 12,000 mi) at 18 knots (33 km/h; 21 mph)
- Complement: 1,751
- Armament: 6 × twin 10 cm (4 in) AA guns; 17 × triple 25 mm (1 in) AA guns
- Armor: Belt: 40–152 mm (1.6–6.0 in); Deck: 75–80 mm (3.0–3.1 in) (upper); 32 mm (1.3 in) (lower)
- Aircraft carried: 65 in combat (53–82 as planned)
- Aviation facilities: 2 × elevators; 1 × crane

Taihō (大鳳; "Great Phoenix") was an aircraft carrier of the Imperial Japanese Navy during World War II. Possessing heavy belt armor and featuring an armored flight deck (a first for any Japanese aircraft carrier), she represented a major departure from prior Japanese aircraft carrier design and was expected to not only survive multiple bomb, torpedo, or shell hits, but also continue fighting effectively afterwards.

Built by Kawasaki at Kobe, she was laid down on 10 July 1941, launched almost two years later on 7 April 1943 and finally commissioned on 7 March 1944. She sank on 19 June 1944 during the Battle of the Philippine Sea due to explosions resulting from design flaws and poor damage control after suffering a single torpedo hit from the American submarine USS Albacore.

== Design ==
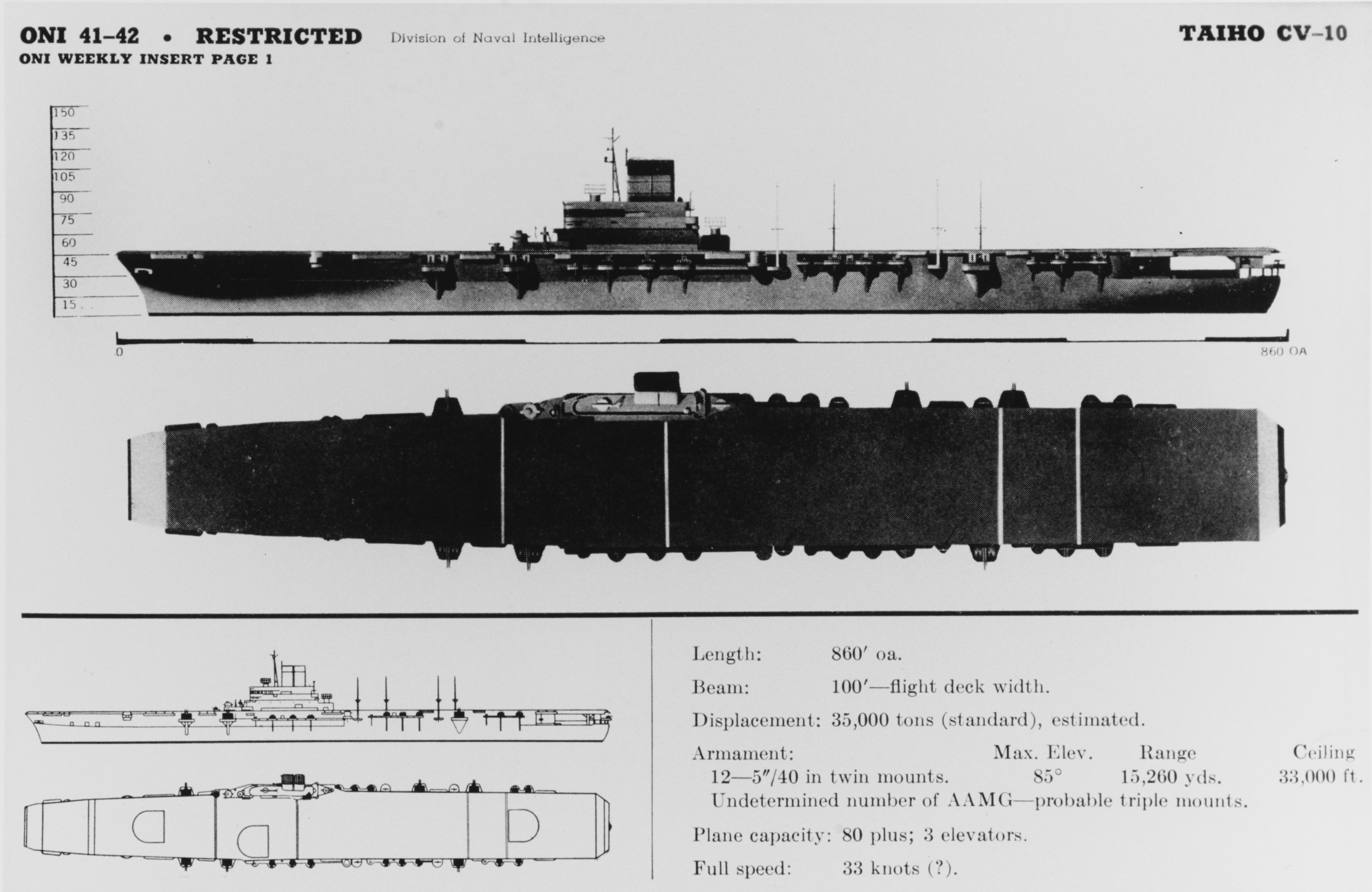
United States Navy recognition drawings of Taiho

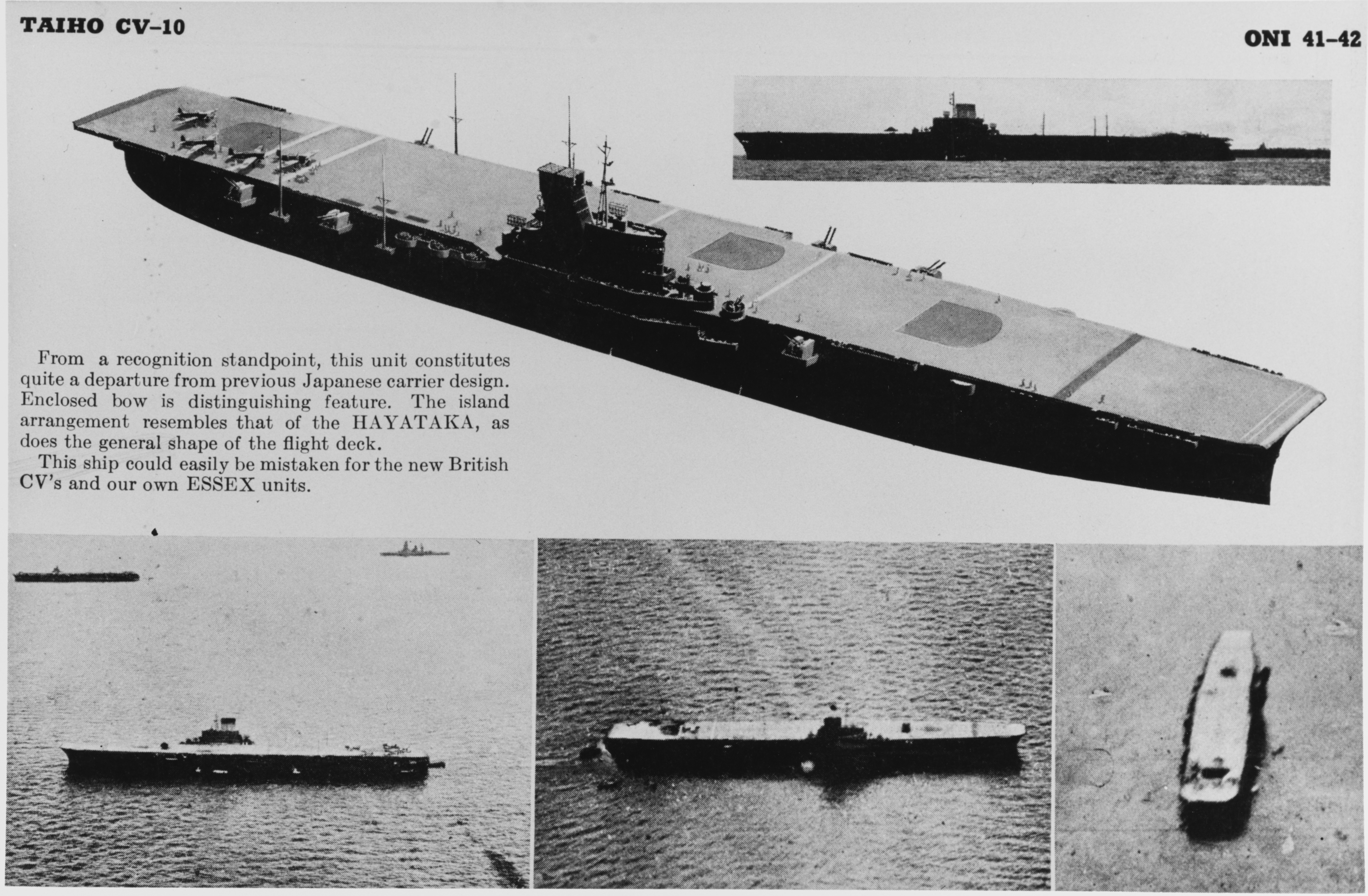
US naval intelligence report on the Taiho

Taihō was approved for construction in the 1939 4th Supplementary Programme. Her design was that of a modified Shōkaku. Under the Modified Fleet Replenishment Program of 1942, Taihō was to be the first of a new generation of Japanese aircraft carriers, which would include Taihō, 15 of a modified Hiryū design (which turned into the Unryū-class) and five of an improved Taihō design (G-15 Project).

=== Hull ===
Taihō's waterline belt armor varied between 55 mm (2.2 in) abreast the machinery to 152 mm (6 in) around the magazines. The armor below the waterline was designed to withstand a 300 kg (660 lb) charge.

The weight of Taihō's armor immersed her hull so deeply that her lower hangar deck was barely above the load waterline and the bottoms of her two elevator wells (which formed the roofs of her fore and aft aviation fuel tanks) were actually below the waterline. This latter fact played an important role in her subsequent destruction during the Battle of the Philippine Sea.

Taihō's aviation fuel tanks were only partially protected with armor, as naval designers opted earlier to devote greater protection to their carriers' bomb and torpedo magazines. The empty air spaces around the aviation fuel tanks turned out to be the ship's downfall; all subsequent Japanese carriers had theirs filled with concrete to protect against splinters and shock damage, although it was poor damage control that ultimately sank Taihō.

To improve seakeeping and airflow over the forward end of the deck, Taihō's bow was plated up to flight deck level, giving her a similar appearance to British Illustrious-class aircraft carriers.

=== Machinery ===
Taihō's eight oil-fired Kampon RO-GO boilers were capable of generating 160,000 shp (120,000 kW). Her four Kampon steam turbines were each geared to separate propeller shafts. She had a top speed of 33.3 kn (61.7 km/h; 38.3 mph). Taihō's maximum fuel oil storage of 5,700 short tons (5,200 t) gave her a radius of 10,000 nmi (19,000 km; 12,000 mi) at 18 kn (33 km/h; 21 mph).

Taihō had two rudders positioned along the longitudinal center-line of the ship: a semi-balanced main rudder (so-called because a portion of the rudder comes before the hinged axis and therefore requires less force to turn) located astern and an unbalanced auxiliary rudder forward of the main rudder. Both were turned via electro-hydraulically powered steering gears, but the auxiliary rudder could also be turned via a diesel engine in the event the primary steering gear was damaged.

=== Flight deck ===
Taihō was the first Japanese aircraft carrier to feature an armored flight deck, designed to withstand multiple 500 kg (1,100 lb) bomb hits with minimal damage. The armor varied slightly in thickness between 75–80 mm (3.0–3.1 in) and formed a protective lid over an enclosed upper hangar whose sides and ends were unarmored. The floor of the upper hangar was also unarmored but the lower hangar deck had 32 mm (1.3 in) plating. Taihō's flight deck, measuring 263 m (862 ft 10 in) long and 30 m (98 ft 5 in) wide, had the largest total area of any Japanese carrier until the completion of Shinano and was offset 2 m (6 ft 7 in) to port to compensate for the weight of her island structure. Unlike all pre-war Japanese carriers, Taihō's flight deck was not wooden-planked. Rather, the steel deck was covered with a newly developed latex coating approximately 6 mm (0.24 in) thick. This offered several advantages over wood: it was cheaper, it saved weight, it required fewer man-hours to apply and it was less likely to interfere with air operations in the event of minor damage. On the negative side, the material had only mediocre anti-skid qualities and tended to become brittle and crack over time.

Fourteen hydraulically operated arrester wires were distributed transversely across the flight deck between the fore and aft elevators. Taihō also had three hydraulically powered crash barriers, designed to abruptly stop any plane failing to catch an arrester wire upon landing. Two were located abreast the island and one was set at the bow. Taihō was equipped with two large 100 long tons (102 t) armored elevators, capable of transferring aircraft weighing up to 7.5 long tons (8 t) between decks. The elevators were widely spaced apart, with one at the far aft end of the ship and one forward of the island. It was originally desired to install a third elevator amidship, but because of wartime urgency this was deleted from the final design, thus saving both time and material. The elevators were roughly pentagonal in shape, with the aft elevator measuring 14 m (45 ft 11 in) long and 14 m (45 ft 11 in) wide. The forward elevator was slightly smaller in width. It took approximately 15 seconds to raise an aircraft from the lower hangar deck to the flight deck and the same to lower one.

=== Hangars ===
Taihō's upper and lower hangars were approximately 150 m (492 ft 2 in) long and 5 m (16 ft 5 in) high. The upper hangar was 1 m (3 ft 3 in) wider than the lower. Fighters were normally stowed in the middle and forward sections of the upper hangar and were raised to flight deck level using the bow elevator to facilitate more rapid handling. Dive bombers occupied the remaining upper hangar spaces with torpedo bombers stowed in the lower hangar. With greater all-up weights and longer take-off runs than the fighters, these planes were brought up to the flight deck using the aft elevator where they could then be spotted as far astern as possible.

As a fire safety precaution, the carrier's two hangars were divided into sections (five on the upper and four on the lower), separated by fire-proofed fabric curtains. The curtains were intended to limit the supply of air to and delay the spread of any fire breaking out on the hangar decks. Further protection against fire was supplied by a foam spray system fed by two rows of pipes and nozzles running along the walls and ends of the hangars. The lower hangar could also be flooded with carbon dioxide where the likelihood of fuel vapor build-up was greatest.

Taihō's original design specified installation of two catapults on her forward bow for power-assisted take-offs. However, as the Imperial Japanese Navy had not developed a workable catapult for carrier decks by the time of Taihō's construction, these were eventually deleted from the requirements. The IJN instead opted to use rocket-assisted take-off gear (RATOG) when necessary. This consisted of two solid-propellant (cordite) rockets attached to either side of a plane's fuselage. Generating 700 kgf (1,500 lbf) of thrust for three seconds, they were able to get an aircraft airborne in a much shorter distance than normally required.

On Taihō's port side, abreast the aft elevator, stood a collapsible crane with a 4 long tons (4 t) lifting capacity. When not in use, it could be folded and lowered below flight deck level through an opening in the deck, thus eliminating a potentially hazardous obstruction during air operations.

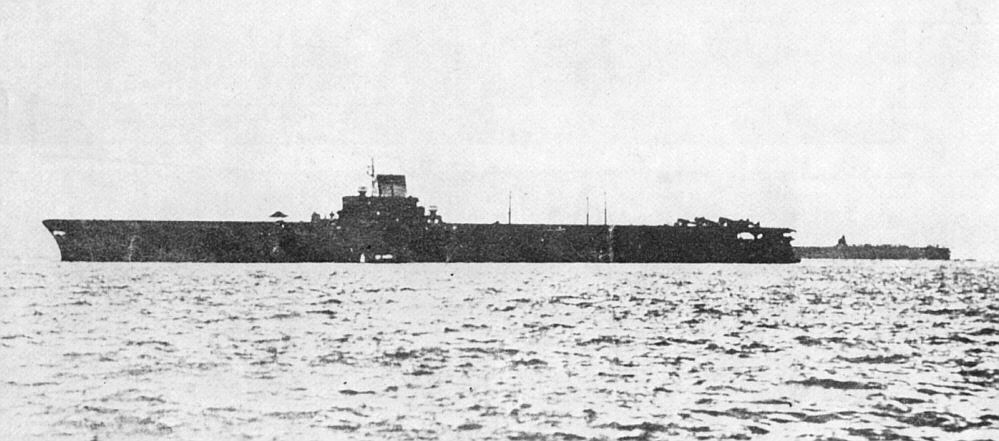
Taihō at anchor at Lingga Roads. The aircraft carrier Shōkaku is in the background.

Taihō's single large funnel, built into the island, was angled 26° from the vertical to starboard and carried the ship's exhaust gases well clear of the flight deck. This arrangement, atypical of most Japanese carriers, was similar to that successfully employed on Junyō and Hiyō and would later be repeated on Shinano.

Three Type 96 searchlights were positioned along the outer edges of the flight deck: two on the port side and one to starboard, just aft of the island. Like the collapsible crane, these could be lowered below flight deck level to prevent interference with normal flight activity. A fourth searchlight was mounted to the starboard side of the carrier's island on a projecting sponson.

=== Armament ===
Taihō's armament comprised 12 of the brand-new 100 mm (3.9 in)/65 caliber Type 98 anti-aircraft guns arranged in six twin-gun turrets: three on the port side and three to starboard. The guns were electro-hydraulically powered; however, in the event of a power failure they could function manually at reduced effectiveness. Operated by a crew of 11, the average firing rate was 15 rounds per minute with a maximum effective horizontal range of 14 km (7.6 nmi; 8.7 mi) and a maximum effective vertical range of 11 km (5.9 nmi; 6.8 mi).

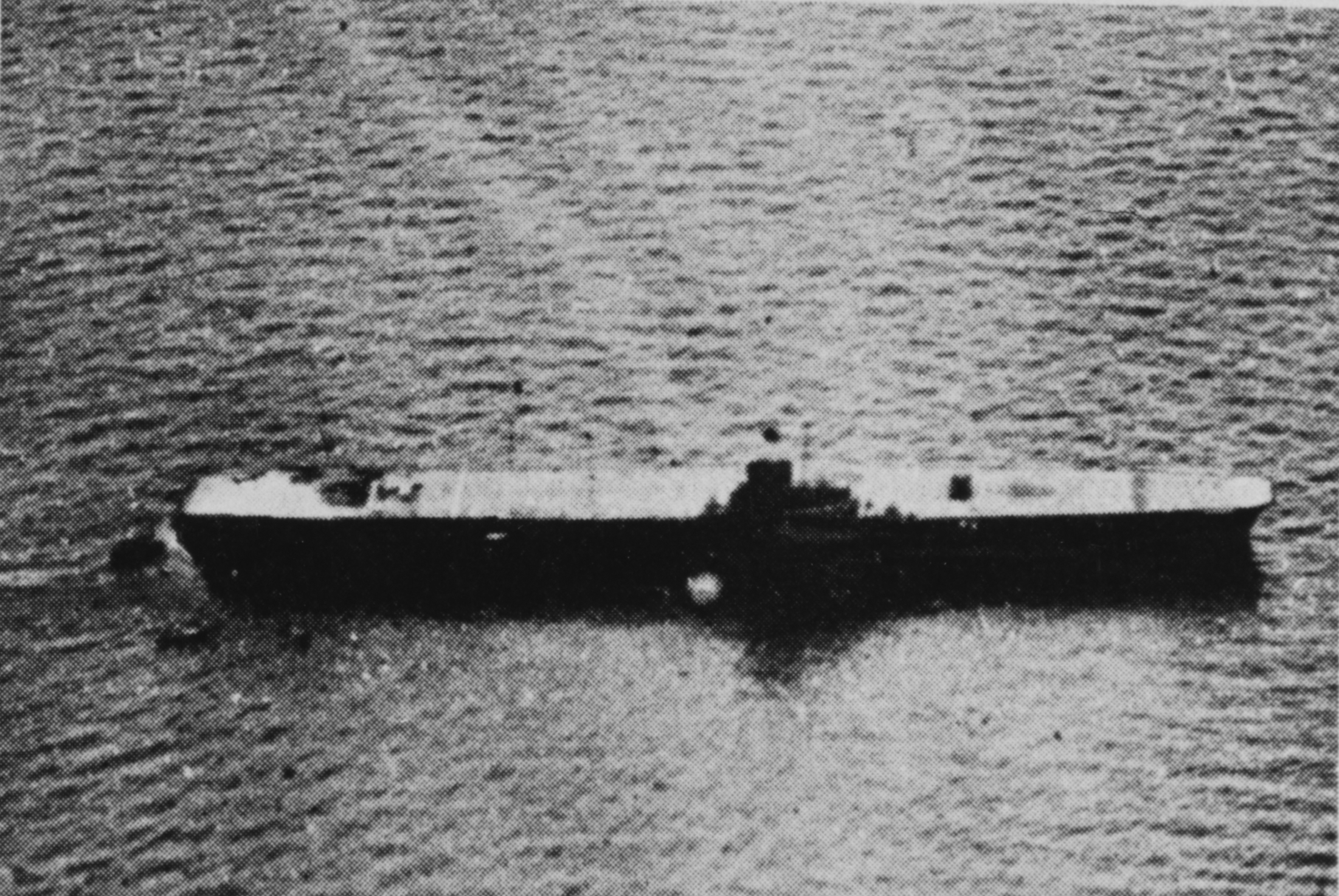
Taihō photographed by US reconnaissance aircraft while anchored in Tawi-Tawi, May 1944

In addition, Taihō carried 17 triple-mount 25 mm (1 in) anti-aircraft cannons (51 barrels total). Sixteen of these were mounted on sponsons just below flight deck level: eight to port, six to starboard and two at the stern. The 17th unit was positioned on the flight deck, just ahead of the island. The triple-mounts were electrically powered (though manual operation was possible) and normally required a crew of nine. They had a practical firing rate of 110–120 rounds per minute and a maximum effective range of 3 km (1.6 nmi; 1.9 mi). The 25 mm (1 in) Type 96 cannon was the Japanese Navy's standard small-caliber anti-aircraft weapon from 1936 through the end of the war in 1945 and was an adaptation of a French design. Additionally, there were 25 portable Type 96 guns which were usually hung on hangar walls and after the plane departed were secured on metal fittings which usually held the aircraft on the deck.

Taihō had two Type 94 triaxially stabilized fire control directors, one mounted on the flight deck ahead of the island and one amidships on the port side, just below flight deck level. These controlled the 100 mm (3.9 in) gun turrets and were electro-hydraulically powered. The 25 mm (1 in) triple-mount cannons were controlled by seven Type 95 fire control units, each of which could direct the fire of two or three mounts.

=== Radar ===
Taihō's original design made no provisions for radar installation as the Imperial Japanese Navy did not possess any shipborne surface, fire control or air search radar at the war's outset in September 1939. Not until January 1941, when a Japanese naval technical mission arrived in Germany, did the IJN learn that European nations were using pulsed radar for combat purposes. In August that same year, the Navy Ministry initiated a crash plan to speed up radar development, resulting in (among others) the Type 21 and Type 13 air search radars.

Prior to completion in 1944, Taihō was fitted with two Type 21 air search radars, one mounted atop the island on the anti-aircraft control platform and one on the lower bridge deck at the aft end of the island. She also had one Type 13 air search set installed with an antenna mounted on the signal mast above the bridge. The Type 21 had a maximum effective range of 80 nmi (150 km; 92 mi) while the Type 13 had a range of 54 nmi (100 km; 62 mi).

=== Aircraft ===
Taihō's planned air complement varied considerably throughout her design and construction. Initially, it was envisioned she would carry 126 aircraft (with 30 of these in reserve). Later, this was pared down to 64, raised again to 78 and finally reduced to 53. One reason for the discrepancy in numbers was (in sharp contrast to the United States) the Imperial Japanese Navy's lack of insistence that its carrier planes have the smallest possible folded wingspan (many designs' folded only near the tips, while the wings of the Yokosuka D4Y Suisei "Judy" dive-bomber did not fold at all). Her aircraft capacity was also changed based on previous wartime experience and the fact that Taihō was expected to carry larger newer-model carrier planes still under development at the time of her construction: 24 Mitsubishi A7M2 Reppu "Sam" fighters, 25 Aichi B7A2 Ryusei "Grace" torpedo-dive bombers and four Nakajima C6N1 Saiun "Myrt" reconnaissance planes. As none of these types were available at the time of her commissioning, Taihō went to sea with older-model aircraft.

Prior to 13 June 1944, Taihō carried 65 aircraft: 22 Mitsubishi A6M5 Reisen (Zero) fighters, 22 Yokosuka D4Y1 Suisei "Judy" dive bombers (of which four were the D4Y1-C reconnaissance types), three Aichi D3A2 "Val" dive bombers and 18 Nakajima B6N2 Tenzan "Jill" torpedo bombers. By 19 June 1944, however, the day the Battle of the Philippine Sea took place, she had already lost nine aircraft due to various causes and had just 56 planes remaining for actual combat.

== Service history ==
Taihō was formally commissioned on 7 March 1944. After several weeks of service trials in Japan's Inland Sea, she was deployed to Singapore, arriving there on 5 April. Taihō was then moved to Lingga Roads, a naval anchorage off Sumatra, where she joined veteran carriers Shōkaku and Zuikaku in the First Carrier Division, First Mobile Force. All three carriers engaged in working up new air groups by practicing launch and recovery operations and acting as targets for mock aerial attacks staged from Singapore airfields by their own planes. On 15 April, Vice-Admiral Jisaburo Ozawa officially transferred his flag from Shōkaku to Taihō to take advantage of the carrier's extensive command facilities. Shortly thereafter, the First Mobile Force departed Lingga and arrived on 14 May at Tawi-Tawi off Borneo, where the fleet could directly refuel with unrefined Tarakan Island crude oil and await execution of the planned Kantai Kessen ("decisive battle") known as Operation A-GO.

When American carrier strikes against the Marianas indicated an invasion of Saipan was imminent, the Japanese Combined Fleet staff initiated Operation A-GO on 11 June. Taihō and the rest of Ozawa's First Mobile Force departed Tawi-Tawi on 13 June, threading their way through the Philippine Islands and setting course for Saipan to attack American carrier forces operating in the vicinity.

=== Battle of the Philippine Sea ===
On 19 June 1944, Taihō was one of nine Japanese aircraft carriers involved in the Battle of the Philippine Sea. At 07:45 she turned into the wind to launch her contribution (16 Zeros, 17 "Judy" dive bombers and 9 "Jill" torpedo bombers) to Ozawa's second attack wave. As Taihō's planes circled overhead to form up, American submarine USS Albacore, which had spotted Ozawa's carriers earlier that morning, reached an ideal attack position and fired a spread of six torpedoes at the carrier. One of Taihō's strike pilots, Warrant Officer Sakio Komatsu, saw the torpedo wakes, broke formation and deliberately dived his plane into the path of one torpedo; the weapon detonated short of its target and four of the remaining five missed. The sixth torpedo, however, found its mark and the resulting explosion holed the carrier's hull on the starboard side, just ahead of the island. The impact also fractured the aviation fuel tanks and jammed the forward elevator between the flight deck and upper hangar deck.

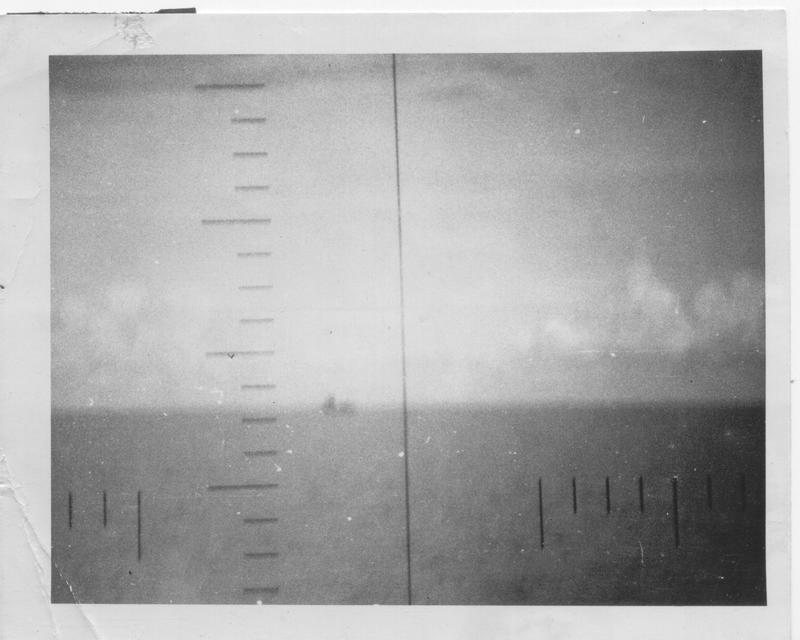
Taihō photographed from USS Albacore's periscope, 19 June 1944

With the ship down 1.5 m (5 ft) by the bow due to flooding, the forward elevator pit filled with a mixture of seawater, fuel oil, and aviation gasoline. Taihō's captain marginally reduced her speed by a knot and a half to slow the ingress of seawater into the hull where the torpedo had struck. As no fires had started, Vice-Admiral Ozawa ordered that the open elevator well be planked over by a flight deck damage control party in order to allow resumption of normal flight operations. By 09:20 am, using wooden benches and tables from the petty officers' and sailors' mess rooms, this task was completed. Ozawa then launched two more waves of aircraft.

Meanwhile, leaking aviation gasoline accumulating in the forward elevator pit began vaporizing and the fumes soon permeated the upper and lower hangar decks. The crew recognised the danger but, through inadequate training, lack of practice or incompetence, their response was ineffectual. They bungled attempts to pump out the damaged elevator well, and failed to cover the fuel with foam from the hangar's fire suppression system.

Because Taihō's hangars were completely enclosed, mechanical ventilation was the only means of exhausting fouled air and replacing it with fresh air. Ventilation duct gates were opened on either side of hangar sections No. 1 and No. 2 and, for a time, the carrier's aft elevator was lowered to try to increase the draught. But this failed to have any appreciable effect and air operations were resumed about noon, requiring the elevator to be periodically raised as aircraft were brought up to the flight deck. In desperation, damage control parties used hammers to smash out the glass in the ship's portholes.

==== Sinking ====
Taihō's chief damage control officer eventually ordered the ship's general ventilation system switched to full capacity and, where possible, all doors and hatches opened to try to rid the ship of fumes. However, this just resulted in saturation of areas previously unexposed to the vapors and increased the chances of accidental or spontaneous ignition. About 14:30 that afternoon, 6½ hours after the initial torpedo hit, Taihō was jolted by a severe explosion. A senior staff officer on the bridge saw the flight deck heave up, and the sides of the ship blew out. Taihō dropped out of formation and began to settle in the water, clearly doomed. Though Admiral Ozawa wanted to go down with the ship, his staff prevailed on him to survive and to transfer his flag to the cruiser Haguro. Taking the Emperor's portrait, Ozawa transferred to Haguro by destroyer Wakatsuki. After he left, Taihō was torn by a second thunderous explosion and sank stern first at 16:28, taking 1,650 officers and men out of a complement of 2,150 down with her.

She sank at coordinates 12°05′N 138°12′E.

== See also ==
- List by death toll of ships sunk by submarines

== Bibliography ==
- Ahlberg, Lars; Lengerer, Hans (2008). Encyclopedia of Warships 40, Taiho volume 2. A. J. Press.
- Brown, David (1977). WWII Fact Files: Aircraft Carriers. Arco Publishing.
- Dull, Paul S. (1978). A Battle History of the Imperial Japanese Navy (1941–1945). Naval Institute Press.
- Evans, David, ed. (1986). The Japanese Navy in World War II; Ozawa in the Pacific: A Junior Officer's Experience by Minoru Nomura. Annapolis, Maryland: Naval Institute Press.
- Friedman, Norman (1981). Naval Radar. Conway Maritime Press.
- Reynolds, Clark G. (1968). The Fast Carriers; The Forging of an Air Navy. New York, Toronto, London, Sydney: McGraw-Hill Book Company.
- Sturton, Ian (1980). "Japan". In Chesneau, Roger (ed.). Conway's All the World's Fighting Ships 1922–1946. Greenwich, UK: Conway Maritime Press. ISBN 0-85177-146-7.
- Tillman, Barrett (2005). Clash of the Carriers: The True Story of the Marianas Turkey Shoot of World War II. NAL Caliber.
- Y'Blood, William T. (1981). Red Sun Setting: The Battle of the Philippine Sea. Naval Institute Press. ISBN 978-0-8702-1532-2.
