= Type 98/Type 1 machine gun =

Army Type 98 / Navy Type 1 machine gun
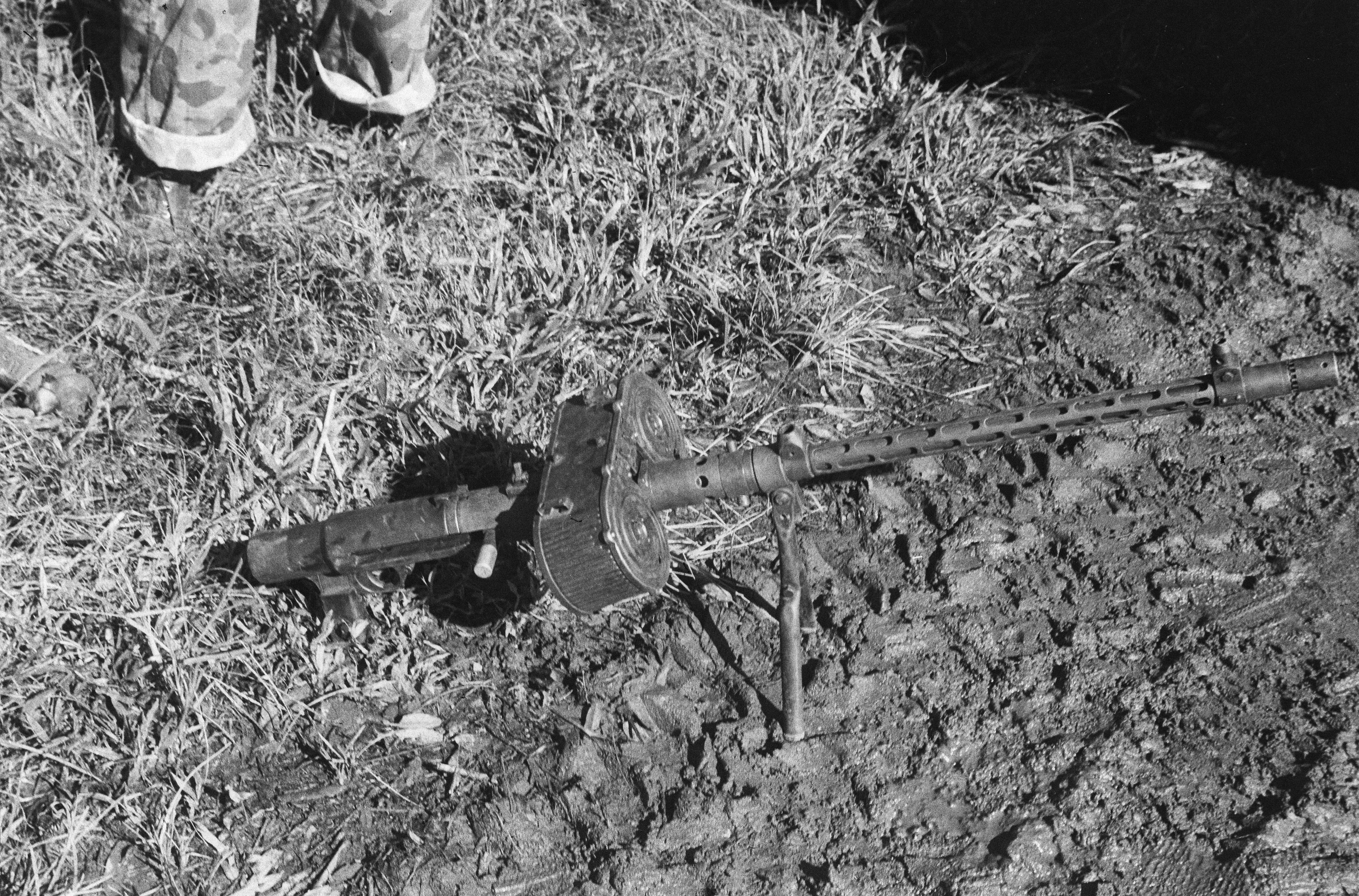
- Army Type 98 or late-variant Navy Type 1 with bipod for field use, captured by Dutch forces in Indonesia, 1947
- Type: Machine gun
- Place of origin: Empire of Japan

Service history
- In service: 1938–1945 (Type 98); 1941–1945 (Type 1)
- Used by: Imperial Japanese Army (Type 98); Imperial Japanese Navy (Type 1)

Production history
- Manufacturer: Type 98; Nagoya Army Arsenal; Type 1 Nagoya Army Arsenal, Tagajo Naval Arsenal, Yokosuka Naval Arsenal

Specifications
- Mass: 7.2 kg (16 lb)
- Length: 1,078 mm (42.4 in)
- Barrel length: 600 mm (24 in)
- Cartridge: 7.92×57mm Mauser
- Rate of fire: 1,000 RPM
- Muzzle velocity: 750 m/s (2,500 ft/s)
- Feed system: 75-round double-drum magazine
- Sights: Iron

The Army Type 98 and Navy Type 1 machine gun were license-built variants of the German MG 15 machine gun intended for aerial use and occasional field use in the Imperial Japanese Army and Navy during World War II.

== Installations ==
=== Army ===
- Kawasaki Ki-45
- Kawasaki Ki-48
- Nakajima Ki-49

=== Navy ===
- Aichi B7A
- Nakajima C6N
- Yokosuka D4Y
