= List of aircraft (N) =

This is a list of aircraft in alphabetical order beginning with 'N'.

== N ==
=== NA ===
(NA Design formerly UNIS)

- NA 40 Bongo
- NA 42 Barracuda
- NA 44 Bion
- NA 50
- NA 542

=== NAC ===
(National Aeroplane Co, Chicago, IL and Galveston, TX)

- Beech-Farman aka Beech-National

=== NAC ===
(National Aircraft Corp)

- NAC Dream

=== NAC ===
(Norman Aeroplane Company Ltd.)

- NAC Fieldmaster
- NAC Firemaster 65

=== NAGL System ===
(Weißkirchen in Steiermark, Austria)

- NAGL System NAGL

=== Nagler ===
(Nagler Helicopter Company Inc, White Plains, NY)

- Nagler Honcho 100
- Nagler Honcho 200
- Nagler Honcho 202
- Nagler NH-120
- Nagler NH-140
- Nagler NH-160
- Nagler NH-170
- Nagler VG-1 Vertigyro
- Nagler VG-2
- Nagler XNH-1 Heliglider
- Nagler XNH-2 Heligyro

=== Nagler-Rolz ===
(Bruno Nagler & Franz Rolz)

- Nagler-Rolz NR-54 V1
- Nagler-Rolz NR-54 V2
- Nagler-Rolz NR-55

=== Naglo ===
(Naglo Bootswerft / Fritz Naglo)

- Naglo D.i (Quadruplane)
- Naglo D.II (Biplane)

=== Nagy ===
(Hugó Nagy)

- Nagy Nádi

=== Nagy-Bansagi ===
(Hugó Nagy & Bansagi)

- Nagy-Bansagi Bene

=== Nagy-Cserkuti ===
(Hugó Nagy & János Cserkuti)

- Nagy-Cserkuti Botond

=== Nakajima ===
(Japanese:中島飛行機株式会社 - Nakajima Hikōki Kabushiki Gaisha - Nakajima Aircraft Company) / (Nakajima Hikoki KK - Nakajima Aeroplane Company Ltd.)

- Nakajima Type 1 Biplane
- Nakajima Type 3 biplane
- Nakajima Type 4 biplane
- Nakajima Type 5 biplane
- Nakajima Type 6 biplane
- Nakajima Type 7 biplane
- Nakajima Type 4 trainer
- Nakajima Type 5 trainer
- Nakajima Bulldog fighter
- Nakajima–Breguet reconnaissance seaplane
- Nakajima–Douglas DC-2 transport
- Nakajima–Fokker Super Universal
- Nakajima–Fokker ambulance aircraft
- Nakajima Akatsuki
- Nakajima Fishery Seaplane
- Nakajima AN-1
- Nakajima AT-1
- Nakajima AT-2
- Nakajima B-6 Biplane
- Nakajima DB
- Nakajima DF
- Nakajima K
- Nakajima Ko-4
- Nakajima LB-2
- Nakajima MS
- Nakajima N-19
- Nakajima N-35
- Nakajima N-36
- Nakajima NAF-1
- Nakajima NAF-2
- Nakajima NC
- Nakajima NK1F
- Nakajima NJ
- Nakajima NY
- Nakajima NZ
- Nakajima P-1
- Nakajima PA
- Nakajima PA-Kai
- Nakajima Type PE
- Nakajima Q
- Nakajima RZ
- Nakajima S
- Nakajima Y3B
- Nakajima YM
- Nakajima A1N
- Nakajima A2N
- Nakajima A3N
- Nakajima A4N
- Nakajima A6M2-N
- Nakajima B3N
- Nakajima B4N
- Nakajima B5N
- Nakajima B6N Tenzan
- Nakajima C2N
- Nakajima C3N
- Nakajima C6N Saiun
- Nakajima D2N
- Nakajima D3N
- Nakajima E2N
- Nakajima E4N
- Nakajima E8N
- Nakajima E12N
- Nakajima G5N Shinzan
- Nakajima G8N Renzan
- Nakajima G10N Fugaku
- Nakajima J1N Gekko
- Nakajima J5N Tenrai
- Nakajima L1N
- Nakajima Ki-4
- Nakajima Ki-6
- Nakajima Ki-8
- Nakajima Ki-11
- Nakajima Ki-12
- Nakajima Ki-13
- Nakajima Ki-16
- Nakajima Ki-19
- Nakajima Ki-27
- Nakajima Ki-31
- Nakajima Ki-34
- Nakajima Ki-37
- Nakajima Ki-41
- Nakajima Ki-43 Hayabusa/Army Type 1 fighter
- Nakajima Ki-44 Shoki
- Nakajima Ki-49 Donryu
- Nakajima Ki-52
- Nakajima Ki-53
- Nakajima Ki-58
- Nakajima Ki-62
- Nakajima Ki-63
- Nakajima Ki-68
- Nakajima Ki-75
- Nakajima Ki-80
- Nakajima Ki-84 Hayate/Army Type 4 fighter
- Nakajima Ki-87
- Nakajima Ki-101
- Nakajima Ki-106 (Wood Ki-84)
- Nakajima Ki-113
- Nakajima Ki-115 Tsurugi
- Nakajima Ki-116 (Ki-84 variant)
- Nakajima Ki-117
- Nakajima Ki-201 Karyu
- Nakajima Ki-230
- Nakajima Army Model 2 Ground Taxi-ing Trainer
- Nakajima Army Type Ko 2 trainer
- Nakajima Army Type Ko 3 fighter/trainer
- Nakajima Army Type Ko 4 fighter
- Nakajima Army Type 91 fighter
- Nakajima Army Type 94 reconnaissance aircraft
- Nakajima Army Type 95-2 crew trainer
- Nakajima Army Type 97 transport
- Nakajima Army Type 97 fighter
- Nakajima Army Type 100 heavy bomber
- Nakajima Army Type 2 single-seat fighter
- Nakajima Army special attacker Tsurugi
- Nakajima Navy experimental 6-shi carrier two-seat fighter
- Nakajima Navy Experimental Kusho 6-shi dive bomber
- Nakajima Navy Experimental 7-shi dive bomber
- Nakajima Navy Experimental 7-shi carrier fighter
- Nakajima Navy experimental 7-shi carrier attack aircraft
- Nakajima Navy experimental 8-shi carrier two-seat fighter
- Nakajima Navy experimental 8-shi reconnaissance seaplane
- Nakajima Navy experimental 8-shi carrier bomber (aka Special Bomber)
- Nakajima Navy experimental 9-shi carrier attack aircraft
- Nakajima Navy experimental 9-shi carrier single-seat fighter
- Nakajima Navy experimental 10-shi carrier attacker (B5N)
- Nakajima Navy experimental 10-shi carrier reconnaissance plane
- Nakajima Navy experimental 11-shi carrier bomber
- Nakajima Navy experimental 12-shi two-seat reconnaissance seaplane
- Nakajima Navy Experimental 12-shi carrier fighter
- Nakajima Navy experimental 13-shi three-seat fighter
- Nakajima Navy experimental 13-shi attack bomber Shinzan
- Nakajima Navy experimental 14-shi carrier attacker Tenzan
- Nakajima Navy experimental 15-shi fighter seaplane
- Nakajima Navy experimental 17-shi carrier teconnaissance plane Saiun
- Nakajima Navy experimental 18-shi attack bomber Renzan
- Nakajima Navy experimental 18-shi Otsu (B) Type interceptor fighter Tenrai
- Nakajima Navy experimental LB-2 long-range attack aircraft
- Nakajima Navy experimental super heavy bomber Fugaku
- Nakajima Navy Type 2 fighter seaplane
- Nakajima Navy Type 2 land attack plane
- Nakajima Navy Type 2 land reconnaissance plane
- Nakajima Navy Type 2 night fighter
- Nakajima Navy Type 3 carrier fighter
- Nakajima Navy Type 15 reconnaissance seaplane
- Nakajima Navy Type 90 training fighter
- Nakajima Navy Type 90 carrier fighter
- Nakajima Navy Type 90-2 reconnaissance seaplane
- Nakajima Navy Type 90-2-2 reconnaissance seaplane
- Nakajima Navy Type 90-2-3 reconnaissance seaplane
- Nakajima Navy Type 95 carrier fighter
- Nakajima Navy Type 95 reconnaissance seaplane
- Nakajima Navy Type 97-1 carrier attack bomber
- Nakajima Navy Type 97-3 carrier attack bomber
- Nakajima Navy Type 97 carrier reconnaissance Aircraft
- Nakajima Navy Type 97 reconnaissance seaplane
- Nakajima Navy Type 97 transport
- Nakajima Navy carrier attack bomber Tenzan
- Nakajima Navy Fokker reconnaissance plane
- Nakajima Navy Carrier reconnaissance plane Saiun
- Nakajima Navy night fighter Gekko
- Nakajima Kōkoku Nigō Heiki (皇国二号兵器 Imperial Weapon No.2) Kikka

=== NAL ===
(National Aerospace Laboratories of India / Taneja Aerospace and Aviation Limited)

- NAL Hansa
- NAL NM5
- NAL Saras

=== NAL ===
(Japanese National Aerospace Laboratory)

- NAL VTOL test rig

=== NAMC ===
(Nihon Aircraft Manufacturing Corporation)

- NAMC YS-11

=== Nanchang ===
(Nanchang Aircraft Manufacturing Co.; now Hongdu)

- Nanchang Dongfeng 106 attack aircraft based on MiG-19
- Nanchang Xiongying 302 early name for the Q-5
- Nanchang A-5 export designation for the Q-5
- Nanchang CJ-5 Chinese version of Yak-18
- Nanchang CJ-6 trainer; improved CJ-5
- Nanchang J-12 prototype single-engine lightweight VTOL fighter
- Nanchang K-8 Karakorum
- Nanchang Q-5 supersonic attack aircraft based on the Shenyang J-6
- Nanchang Q-6 projected swing-wing fighter-bomber based on MiG-23, not built
- Nanchang Y-5 Chinese-built An-2
- Nanchang Jing Gang Shan-4
- Nanchang N-5A
- Nanchang N-5B
- Nanchang Haiyan

=== Nanchang/Hongdu ===
- Nanchang/Hongdu JL-8

=== Nanjing Institute of Aeronautics ===
- ChangKong-1
- NAI AD-100 Traveller

=== Nanjing Light Aircraft Co. ===
- NLA AC-500 Aircar

=== Narahara ===
(Sanji Narahara / Tokyo Hikoki Sesakusho - Tokyo Aeroplane Manufacturing Works)

- Narahara No.1
- Narahara No.1
- Narahara No.1
- Narahara No.1 Ohtori-go

=== Nardi ===
(Fratelli Nardi)

- Nardi FN.305
- Nardi FN.310
- Nardi FN.315
- Nardi FN.316
- Nardi FN.333
- Nardi FN.500

=== NARP ===
(Nikolaev Aircraft Repair Plant)

- NARP-1

=== Narushevich ===
- Narushevich Ring Wing

=== NAS ===
(National Airways System Inc (founders: Glenn J Romkey & Shukri F Tannus), Lomax, IL)

- NAS Air King 1926 (1)
- NAS Air King 1926 (2)
- NAS Air King Dole racer
- NAS Air King 1928
- NAS Air King Mono-4
- NAS Air Prince

=== NASA ===
- NASA AD-1
- NASA Centurion
- NASA Helios
- NASA Hyper III
- NASA M2-F1
- NASA Paresev
- NASA Pathfinder
- NASA Pathfinder Plus
- NASA Puffin
- NASA Electric Aircraft Testbed (ground-based testbed)
- NASA Prandtl D
- NASA X-57 Maxwell
- NASA Ingenuity helicopter

=== Nash ===
((Paul) Nash Aircraft Co, Chapin, IL)

- Nash N

=== Nash ===
(Nash Aircraft Ltd.)

- Nash Petrel

=== Nash-Kelvinator ===
(Kelvinator Div, Nash-Kelvinator Corp, Detroit, MI)

- Nash-Kelvinator JRK
- Nash-Kelvinator R-6 Hoverfly - licence production of the Sikorsky R-6

=== National ===
(National Aircraft Corp, Watts Airport, Beaverton, OR)

- National Bluebird C-3
- National Bluebird LP-1
- National Bluebird LP-3
- National Bluebird LP-4
- National Bluebird S-1

=== National ===
(National Airplane & Motor Co, 2810 E 11 St, Los Angeles, CA)

- National 1940 Aeroplane

=== National ===
(National Aircraft Corp, 3411 Tulare Ave, Burbank, CA)

- National NA-75

=== National ===
(National Motors Corp, Stout Field, Indianapolis, IN)

- National S-90
- National S-125

=== National Wingless ===
(National Wingless Aircraft Inc, 410 Donner Ave, Monessen, PA)

- National Wingless 1935 Aeroplane

=== Nationale Vliegtuig Industrie ===
see NVI

=== NAU ===
(Nanchang Aviation University)

- NAU Black-headed Gull

=== Naugle ===
((Harry C & Richard G) Naugle Aircraft Corp, Latrobe, PA)

- Naugle Mercury N-1
- Naugle Mercury N-2

=== NAV ===
(Nederlandsche Automobiel en Vliegteuig Ondernemin)

- NAV.6

=== Naval Air Establishment ===
(Imperial Chinese Navy)

- Naval Air Establishment Chiang Hung (1930) - 2 or 3 seat touring plane and reconnaissance aircraft
- Naval Air Establishment Chiang Hau (1932) - powered with single 165 hp Wright Whirlwind engine
- Naval Air Establishment Chiang Gaen
- Naval Air Establishment Ning Hai
- DH.6 like seaplane
- Naval Air Establishment Beeng (1918?) - tractor biplane/float fighter bomber with single 360 hp prop engine
- Naval Air Establishment Char 1918 - 2 seat primary trainer seaplane
- Naval Air Establishment Ding (1934) - 2 seat bombing/torpedo seaplane using a single 360 hp Rolls-Royce engine
- Naval Air Establishment Wu (1918?) - general purpose observation aircraft
- Naval Air Establishment Yee (1918?) - 2 seat advance trainer and variant of Char seaplane

=== Naval Aircraft Factory ===
- Naval Aircraft Factory BN
- Naval Aircraft Factory BS
- Naval Aircraft Factory FN
- Naval Aircraft Factory GB (Giant Boat)
- Naval Aircraft Factory LRN
- Naval Aircraft Factory LR2N
- Naval Aircraft Factory N
- Naval Aircraft Factory N2N
- Naval Aircraft Factory N3N Canary
- Naval Aircraft Factory N5N
- Naval Aircraft Factory NM
- Naval Aircraft Factory NO
- Naval Aircraft Factory O2N
- Naval Aircraft Factory OSN
- Naval Aircraft Factory OS2N
- Naval Aircraft Factory SON Seagull
- Naval Aircraft Factory OS2N Kingfisher
- Naval Aircraft Factory PBN Catalina
- Naval Aircraft Factory PN
- Naval Aircraft Factory P2N
- Naval Aircraft Factory P4N
- Naval Aircraft Factory PT
- Naval Aircraft Factory SA
- Naval Aircraft Factory SBN
- Naval Aircraft Factory SON
- Naval Aircraft Factory SP (Mercury Racer)
- Naval Aircraft Factory T2N
- Naval Aircraft Factory TDN
- Naval Aircraft Factory TD2N
- Naval Aircraft Factory TD3N
- Naval Aircraft Factory TF
- Naval Aircraft Factory TG
- Naval Aircraft Factory TS
- Naval Aircraft Factory TN

=== Navarro ===
(Navarro Safety Aircraft / Joseph Navarro)

- Navarro Chief
- Navarro Naiad

=== Navion ===
(Navion Aircraft Corp, Seguin, TX)

- Navion Model H
- Navion Rangemaster G-1

=== NAVO ===
(Nederlandse Automobiel en-Vleegtuig Onderneming - Dutch Motorcar and Aircraft Co.)

- NAVO RK-P4/220

=== NDN ===
(NDN Aircraft Ltd.)

- NDN-1 Firecracker
- NDN-1T Turbo Firecracker
- NDN-6 Fieldmaster

=== Neau ===
(Robert Neau)

- Neau NR.01 Farfadet

=== Nederlands Automobile and Aeroplane Co ===
see: Spijker

=== Neilson ===
((Thomas S & Duncan S) Neilson Steel Aircraft Co, Berkeley, CA)

- Neilson NC-1 Golden Bear

=== Neiva ===
(Sociedade Aeronáutica Neiva SA / Indústria Aeronáutica Neiva SA / Sociedade Constructora Aeronáutica Neiva SA)

- Neiva P-56 Agricola
- Neiva BN-1 1950s glider
- Neiva BN-2 glider
- Neiva B Monitor glider
- Neiva Brasilia
- Neiva Campeiro
- Neiva Carajá
- Neiva Corisco (Cherokee Arrow II)
- Neiva Ipanema
- Neiva Lanceiro
- Neiva Minuano
- Neiva Paulistinha 56
- Neiva Rebocador
- Neiva Regente
- Neiva Seneca
- Neiva Sertanejo
- Neiva Universal
- Neiva N-582
- Neiva N-591
- Neiva N-592

=== Nelsch ===
(William Nelsch, St Louis, MO)

- Nelsch Monoplane

=== Nelson ===
(Norman Nelson, Cloquet, MN)

- Nelson Trainer

=== Nelson ===
(Nelson Aircraft Corp, San Fernando, CA)

- Nelson Bumblebee
- Nelson Dragonfly
- Nelson Humming Bird

=== Nelson ===
(Raymond Nelson, Tacoma, WA, 19??: Deer Park, NY)

- Nelson N-1 Special
- Nelson N-4

=== Nelson ===
(Bob Nelson, Pendleton, OR)

- Nelson 1-B Special
- Nelson Sport

=== Nelson ===
(Robert Nelson)

- Nelson Star Lance 1

=== Nelson-Driscoll ===
(Nels J Nelson & Benjamin B Driscoll, 176 E Main St, New Britain and Wallingford Airport, CT)

- Nelson-Driscoll Fleet Wing

=== Nemeth ===
(Steven Paul Nemeth, Chicago, IL)

- Nemeth Umbrellaplane

=== Nennig ===
- Nennig C-3
- Nennig C-5

=== Nervures ===
(Soulom, France)

- Nervures Aloha
- Nervures Alpamayo
- Nervures Altea
- Nervures Arteson
- Nervures Diamir
- Nervures Estive
- Nervures Etna
- Nervures Erebus
- Nervures Espade
- Nervures Everglades
- Nervures Faial
- Nervures Huapi
- Nervures Kailash
- Nervures Kenya
- Nervures Lhotse
- Nervures LOL
- Nervures Morea
- Nervures Spantik
- Nervures Stromboli
- Nervures Swoop
- Nervures Toubkal
- Nervures Valluna
- Nervures Whizz

=== Nesmith ===
(Robert E Nesmith, Houston, TX)

- Nesmith Cougar
- Nesmith Cougar Comet
- Nesmith Chigger

=== Neubert ===
(Wil Neubert, Long Beach and San Luis Obispo, CA)

- Neubert Nostalgia

=== Neukom ===
(Albert Neukom Segelflugzeugbau / Werner Pfenniger & Albert Markwalder)

- Neukom AN-20B Albatros
- Neukom AN-100

=== Neumann ===
(Everett Neumann, Ham Lake, MN)

- Neumann N-2

=== Neunteufel ===
(Al Neunteufel)

- Neunteufel Mini-Copter

=== NeuraJet ===
(Senftenbach, Austria)

- NeuraJet Neura Jet

=== Neuschloss-Lichtig ===
- NL Sportplane

=== New Avio ===
- New Avio C205

=== New England ===
(New England Air Transport Co (aka NEAT Co) (Pres: George H Armitage), Jefferson Ave, Hillsgrove, RI)

- New England F-2
- New England F-2-WG

=== New Era ===
(New Era Aircraft Corp, Butler, PA)

- New Era Model A
- New Era Model B

=== New Kolb ===
- Kolb Flyer Super Sport
- Kolb Flyer
- Kolb Flyer Powered Parachute
- Kolb Ultrastar
- Kolb Firefly
- Kolb Firestar
- Kolb Mark III
- Kolb Slingshot
- Kolb Kolbra
- Kolb Pelican

=== New PowerChutes ===
(Alberton, Gauteng, South Africa)

- New PowerChutes Gemini

=== New Standard ===
(Standard Aircraft Corp, Paterson, NJ)

- New Standard D-24
- New Standard D-25
- New Standard D-26
- New Standard D-27
- New Standard D-28
- New Standard D-29
- New Standard D-30
- New Standard D-31
- New Standard D-32
- New Standard D-33
- New Standard NT-1
- New Standard NT-2

=== New York ===
(New York Aero Construction Co, Newark, NJ)

- New York 1916 Biplane

=== Newbauer ===
((Valentine) Newbauer Vertical Airplane Co, Monterey Park, CA)

- Newbauer 1927 Helicopter
- Newbauer Hummingbird

=== Newhouse ===
((Richard A and Werner A) Newhouse Flying Service, Rocky Hill-Princeton, NJ)

- Newhouse 1911 Biplane
- Newhouse NS-1

=== Newland ===
(K C "Casey" Newland, Harvey, IL)

- Newland B-45

=== Newman ===
(William L Newman, Carlsbad, CA)

- Newman 1935 Monoplane

=== Newman ===
(Harley Newman, Carlsbad, CA)

- Newman RA-20

=== Nexaer ===
(Peyton, CO)

- Nexaer LS1

=== Nexus ===
(Richard Eaves)

- Nexus Mustang

=== Neybar ===
(Neyeloff and Barandeguy)

- Neybar N.1

=== NFS ===
(Nippon Hiko Gakko - Nippon Flying School)

- NFS Tamai No.1
- NFS Tamai No.2
- NFS Tamai No.3

=== N.F.W. ===
(National Flugzeug-Werke G.m.b.H.)

- NFW B.I
- NFW E.I
- NFW E.II
- NFW Experimental monoplane

=== N.F.W. ===
(Nordwestdeutsche Flugzeugwerke / Heinrich Evers & Co., Bremervörde)

- NFW E.5

=== NHI ===
(Nederlandse Helikopter Industrie)

- NHI H-2
- NHI H-3 Kolibrie

=== NHI ===
- NHI NH90

=== NIAI ===
(Nauchno-Issledovatelskii Aero-Institut - scientific research aero-institute)

- NIAI LK
- NIAI LIG-8
- NIAI RK
- NIAI LIG-7
- NIAI RK-I
- NIAI RK-2
- NIAI LK-1
- NIAI 1
- NIAI LK-4
- NIAI-4
- NIAI P-3
- NIAI LIG-5
- NIAI DP
- NIAI OB
- NIAI ON
- NIAI LEM-3
- NIAI LIG-6
- NIAI SKh-1
- NIAI LIG-10
- OSh

=== Nicholas-Beazley ===
(Nicholas-Beazley Airplane Co., Marshall, MO)

- Nicholas-Beazley NB-3 (a.k.a. Barling NB-3)
- Nicholas-Beazley NB-4
- Nicholas-Beazley NB-7
- Nicholas-Beazley NB-8G
- Nicholas-Beazley NB-PG
- Nicholas-Beazley Phantom I a.k.a. Pobjoy Special
- Nicholas-Beazley-Standard modified Standard J-1
- Nicholas-Beasley Pobjoy Special
- Nicholas-Beasley Reaver Special

=== Nichols ===
(A H Nichols, Rochester, NY)

- Nichols 1910 Monoplane

=== Nichols ===
(A H Nichols, Rochester, NY)

- Nichols Fusion

=== Nicholson ===
(Hugh G Nicholson Jr, NY)

- Nicholson Junior KN-2

=== Nickel & Foucard ===
(Rudy nickel & Joseph Foucard)

- Nickel & Foucard NF.001 Asterix
- Nickel & Foucard NF-2 Asterix

=== Nicolas-Claude ===
- Nicolas-Claude NC-2 Aquilon

=== Nicollier ===
- Nicollier HN 433 Menestrel
- Nicollier HN 434 Super Menestrel
- Nicollier HN 500 Bengali
- Nicollier HN 600 Week-end
- Nicollier HN 700 Menestrel II
- Nicollier HN 800

=== Nielsen & von Lübcke ===
(Nielsen & von Lübcke G.m.b.H.)

- Nielsen & von Lübcke Eindecker

=== Nielsen & Winther ===
(A/S Nielsen & Winther)

- Nielsen & Winther Type Aa
- Nielsen & Winther Type Ab
- Nielsen & Winther Type Ac
- Nielsen & Winther Type Bd
- Nielsen & Winther Type Da?4-person “Tourist-aircraft” (maybe called the Type Da)?
- Nielsen & Winther Type C
- Nielsen & Winther Type E
- Nielsen & Winther Type Fa

=== Nieman ===
(Hilbert (Burton) Nieman, MN)

- Nieman Burtster

=== Niess ===
(William Niess)

- Niess I-200
- Niess 5FG

=== Nieuport ===
(Société Générale d'Aéro-locomotion / Société Anonyme des Établissements Nieuport)

- Nieuport I
- Nieuport IIA
- Nieuport IID
- Nieuport IIG
- Nieuport IIN
- Nieuport IIIA
- Nieuport IV
- Nieuport IVG
- Nieuport IVM
- Nieuport VIG
- Nieuport VIH
- Nieuport VIM
- Nieuport 10
- Nieuport 11
- Nieuport 12
- Nieuport 12bis
- Nieuport 13
- Nieuport 14
- Nieuport 15
- Nieuport 16
- Nieuport 17
- Nieuport 17bis
- Nieuport 18
- Nieuport 19
- Nieuport 20
- Nieuport 21
- Nieuport 23
- Nieuport 23bis
- Nieuport 24
- Nieuport 24bis
- Nieuport 25
- Nieuport 26
- Nieuport 27
- Nieuport 28
- Nieuport 29
- Nieuport 30T
- Nieuport 31
- Nieuport 80
- Nieuport 81
- Nieuport 82
- Nieuport 83
- Nieuport 120
- Nieuport 140
- Nieuport 160
- Nieuport 1913
- Nieuport Madon
- Nieuport monoplane
- Nieuport Scout
- Nieuport Triplane#1
- Nieuport Triplane#2
- Nieuport S (Tellier T.6)
- Nieuport 4R (Tellier Vonna)
- Nieuport BM (Tellier T.5)
- Nieuport TM (Tellier T.8)

=== Nieuport & General Aircraft ===
- Nieuport B.N.1
- Nieuport Nighthawk
- Nieuport London
- Nieuport Nightjar

=== Nieuport-Delage ===
Data from:

- Nieuport-Delage NiD 29
- Nieuport-Delage Sesquiplan
- Nieuport-Delage NiD 30
- Nieuport-Delage NiD 31
- Nieuport-Delage NiD 32
- Nieuport-Delage NiD 33
- Nieuport-Delage NiD 37
- Nieuport-Delage NiD 38
- Nieuport-Delage NiD 39
- Nieuport-Delage NiD 40
- Nieuport-Delage NiD 41
- Nieuport-Delage NiD 42
- Nieuport-Delage NiD 43
- Nieuport-Delage NiD 44
- Nieuport-Delage NiD 450
- Nieuport-Delage NiD 46
- Nieuport-Delage NiD 48
- Nieuport-Delage NiD 481
- Nieuport-Delage NiD 48bis
- Nieuport-Delage NiD 50 HB.4
- Nieuport-Delage NiD 52
- Nieuport-Delage NiD 540
- Nieuport-Delage NiD 580
- Nieuport-Delage NiD 590
- Nieuport-Delage NiD 62
- Nieuport-Delage NiD 640
- Nieuport-Delage NiD 650
- Nieuport-Delage NiD 690
- Nieuport-Delage NiD 72
- Nieuport-Delage NiD 740
- Nieuport-Delage NiD 82
- Nieuport-Delage NiD 940
- Nieuport-Delage NiD 941
- Nieuport-Delage NiD 942
- Nieuport-Delage NiD 120
- Nieuport-Delage NiD 121
- Nieuport-Delage NiD 122
- Nieuport-Delage NiD 123
- Nieuport-Delage NiD 125

=== Nieuport-Macchi ===
( Giulio Macchi, Varese)

- Nieuport-Macchi N.VI
- Nieuport-Macchi Parasol
- Nieuport-Macchi N.10
- Nieuport-Macchi N.11
- Nieuport-Macchi N.17

=== Nihon University ===
Data from:

- Nihon N-58 Shigunetto (Cygnet)
- Nihon N-62 Eaglet
- Nihon NM-63 Linnet I
- Nihon NM-66 Linnet II
- Nihon NM-69 Linnet III
- Nihon N-70 Cygnus
- Nihon NM-72 Egret 1
- Nihon NM-73 Egret 2
- Nihon NM-74 Egret 3
- Nihon N-75 Cygnus II
- Nihon NM-75 Stork A
- Nihon Ibis
- Nihon Linnet IV
- Nihon Linnet V
- Nihon MiLan 81
- Nihon MiLan 82
- Nihon Stork A
- Nihon Stork B
- Nihon Ibis
- Nihon Milan 81
- Nihon Milan 82
- Nihon Swift A
- Nihon Swift B
- Nihon Swift C
- Nihon Mowe I
- Nihon Mowe II
- Nihon Mowe III
- Nihon Mowe IV
- Nihon Mowe V
- Nihon Mowe VI
- Nihon Mowe VII
- Nihon Mowe VIII
- Nihon Mowe IX
- Nihon Mowe X
- Nihon Mowe XIII
- Nihon Mowe XIV
- Nihon Mowe XV
- Nihon A Day Fly
- Nihon Papillion A
- Nihon Papillion B
- Nihon Papillion C
- Nihon Yuri I
- Nihon Yuri II
- Nihon Yuri III- 1994 Human Power, almost certainly a typo for Yuri I
- Nihon Sakuzo 1
- Nihon Sakuzo 2
- Nihon Sakuzo 3
- Nihon Sakuzo 4

=== Niki Rotor Aviation ===
(Pravets, Bulgaria)

- Niki 2004
- Niki 2004M
- Niki 2008
- Niki 2009
- Niki Lightning
- Niki Kallithea

=== Nippon ===
(Nippon Kogata Hikoki KK - Japan Small Aeroplane Co Ltd.)

- Nippon Hachi Motor-glider
- Nihon Kogata Ku-11
- Nihon Kogata K8P
- Nihon Kogata L7P
- Nihon Kogata Navy Experimental 12-Shi Primary Trainer Seaplane
- Nihon Kogata Navy Experimental 13-Shi Small Amphibious Transport
- Nihon Kogata MXJ1
- Nihon Kogata Navy Primary Training Glider Wakakusa

=== Nikitin ===
(Vasilii Vasilyevich Nikitin)

- Nikitin NV-1
- Nikitin NV-2
- Nikitin NV-2bis
- Nikitin NV-4
- Nikitin MU-4
- Nikitin PSN-1
- Nikitin PSN-2
- Nikitin MU-4
- Nikitin MU-5
- Nikitin NV-5
- Nikitin NV-5bis
- Nikitin LSh
- Nikitin NV-6
- Nikitin-Shevchenko IS-1
- Nikitin-Shevchenko IS-2
- Nikitin-Shevchenko IS-4
- Nikitin UTI-5
- Nikitin U-5
- Nikitin U-5bis
- Nikitin U-5/MG-31
- Nikitin UTI-6

=== Niles ===
(Niles Aircraft Corporation / Joe Niles, Ephrata, WA)

- Williams Gold Tip
- Niles 1928 monoplane

=== Nilsson ===
(Erland Nilsson)

- Nilsson Beda (aka Sjöflygplanet "Beda")

=== Nimmo ===
(Rod Nimmo, Albuquerque, NM)

- Nimmo NAC-SB-1
- Nimmo Special a.k.a. Argander Special
- Nimmo Smirnoff Special

=== Nippi ===
(a.k.a. Nippi, Nihon Aeroplane Co Ltd. - Nihon Hikoki KK)

- Nippi NH-1 Hibari
- Nihon L7P
- Nippi Navy Experimental 12-shi Primary Seaplane Trainer
- Nippi Navy Experimental 13-shi Small Transport
- Nippi K8N1
- Nihon Hikoki X1G1
- Nihon Hikoki X1G1B
- Nihon Hikoki X1G2A
- Nihon Hikoki X1G2B
- Nihon Hikoki X1G3

=== Nishida ===
(Matsuzo Nishida)

- Nishida Sport Aeroplane

=== Nix ===
(Tommy H Nix, Guin, AL)

- Nix Baby Beech 18 modified Ercoupe

=== Nixon ===
(John F Nixon, Philadelphia, PA)

- Nixon Special

=== Noel ===
(Cecil Noel, Guernsey)

- Noel Wee Mite

=== Noel ===
(Noel - WWI France)

- Noel reconnaissance biplane

=== Noin ===
- Noin Choucas
- Noin Sirius

=== Noorduyn ===
(Noorduyn Aircraft Ltd)

- Noorduyn Norseman

=== Nord ===
- Nord Pingouin
  - Nord 1000 Pingouin
  - Nord 1001 Pingouin I
  - Nord 1002 Pingouin II
- Nord Noralpha
  - Nord 1100 Noralpha
  - Nord 1101 Noralpha
  - Nord 1102 Noralpha
  - Nord 1104 Noralpha
  - Nord 1110 Nord-Astazou
- Nord Norécrin
  - Nord 1200 Norécrin
  - Nord 1201 Norécrin
  - Nord 1202 Norécrin II
  - Nord 1203 Norécrin II
  - Nord 1203 Norécrin III
  - Nord 1203 Norécrin IV
  - Nord 1203 Norécrin V
  - Nord 1204 Norécrin
- Nord Norélan
  - Nord 1221 Norélan
  - Nord 1222 Norélan
  - Nord 1223 Norélan
  - Nord 1226 Norélan
- Nord 1300
- Nord Noroit
  - Nord 1400 Noroit
  - Nord 1401 Noroit
  - Nord 1402 Noroit
- Nord Gerfaut
  - Nord 1402A Gerfaut IA
  - Nord 1402B Gerfaut IB
  - Nord 1405 Gerfaut II
- Nord 1500 Noréclair
- Nord 1500 Griffon I
- Nord 1500 Griffon II
- Nord 1601
- Nord 1700 Norélic
- Nord 1710
- Nord 1750 Norelfe
- Nord 2000
- Nord 2100 Norazur
- Nord 2200
- Nord 2210
- Nord Noratlas
  - Nord 2500 Noratlas
  - Nord 2501 Noratlas
  - Nord 2502 Noratlas
  - Nord 2503 Noratlas
  - Nord 2504 Noratlas
  - Nord 2506 Noratlas
  - Nord 2507 Noratlas
  - Nord 2508 Noratlas
  - Nord 2509 Noratlas Canceled
  - Nord 2510 Noratlas Canceled
  - Nord 2520 Noratlas Canceled
- Nord 2800
- Nord 3200
- Nord 3201
- Nord 3202
- Nord 3212
- Nord 3400 Norbarbe
- Nord 260
- Nord 262
- Nord 500
- Nord CT10
- Nord CT20
- Nord CT41 Narwhal
- Nord R20
- Nord NC.850
  - Nord NC.853S
  - Nord NC.853G
  - Nord NC.854
  - Nord NC.854SA
  - Nord NC.856
  - Nord NC.856A Norvegie
  - Nord NC.856B
  - Nord NC.856H
  - Nord NC.856N Norclub
  - Nord NC.858S
  - Nord NC.859S
- Nord Super Griffon

=== Nordflug ===
(Norddeutschen Flugzeugewerken Teltow, Berlin)

- Nordflug FB 1

=== Nordic Aircraft ===
(Nordic Aircraft AS, Kinsarvik, Norway)

- Nordic Omsider

=== Norman Aviation ===
- Norman Aviation J6 Karatoo
- Norman Aviation Nordic I
- Norman Aviation Nordic II
- Norman Aviation Nordic III
- Norman Aviation Nordic IV
- Norman Aviation Nordic V
- Norman Aviation Nordic VI
- Norman Aviation Nordic VII
- Norman Aviation Nordic 8 Mini Explorer

=== Norman Thompson ===
- Norman Thompson N.T.4
- Norman Thompson N.T.2B
- Norman Thompson N.1B
- Norman Thompson N.2C

=== Normand Dube ===
(Aviation Normand Dube)

- Normand Dube Aerocruiser Plus
- Normand Dube Aerocruiser 450 Turbo

=== Normande ===
(Société Aéronautique Normande - SAN)

- See: SAN

=== Norris ===
((Rolla V) Norris Aircraft Manufacturer, San Francisco, CA)

- Norris Foolproof Aeroplane

=== Norsk Flyindustri ===
See:Hønningstad

=== Norske Hæren Flyfabrikk ===
- Flyfabrikk 1918 biplane

=== North ===
(Fred North)

- North Tui Sports

=== North American Aviation ===
- North American A-2 Savage
- North American A-5 Vigilante
- North American A-27
- North American A-36 Apache
- North American AT-6
- North American AT-24
- North American AJ Savage
- North American A2J
- North American A3J Vigilante
- North American B-21
- North American B-25 Mitchell
- North American B-28 Dragon
- North American B-45 Tornado
- North American B-70 Valkyrie
- North American BC-1
- North American BC-2
- North American BT-9
- North American BT-10
- North American BT-14
- North American BT-28
- North American F-1 Fury
- North American F-6 Mustang
- North American F-19
- North American F-82 Twin Mustang
- North American F-86 Sabre
- North American F-93
- North American F-95
- North American F-100 Super Sabre
- North American F-107 Ultra Sabre
- North American F-108 Rapier
- North American FJ-1 Fury
- North American FJ-2/-3 Fury
- North American FJ-4 Fury
- North American FJ-5
- North American L-17
- North American NJ
- North American O-47
- North American P-51 Mustang
- North American P-64
- North American P-78
- North American P-82 Twin Mustang
- North American P-86
- North American PBJ
- North American PJ
- North American SM-64 Navaho
- North American SNJ
- North American SN2J
- North American T-2 Buckeye
- North American T-6 Texan
- North American T-28 Trojan
- North American T-39 Sabreliner
- North American T2J Buckeye
- North American T3J
- North American OV-10 Bronco
- North American X-10
- North American X-15
- North American FS-1 Hoverbuggy
- North American GA-38X
- North American KXA
- North American NA-16
- North American NA-19
- North American NA-19A
- North American NA-20
- North American NA-22
- North American NA-23
- North American NA-26
- North American NA-27
- North American NA-28
- North American NA-29
- North American NA-30
- North American NA-31
- North American NA-32
- North American NA-33
- North American NA-34
- North American NA-35
- North American NA-37
- North American NA-40
- North American NA-41
- North American NA-42
- North American NA-43
- North American NA-44
- North American NA-45
- North American NA-46
- North American NA-47
- North American NA-48
- North American NA-49
- North American NA-56
- North American NA-57
- North American NA-61
- North American NA-64 Yale
- North American NA-68
- North American NA-71
- North American NA-72
- North American NA-142
- North American NA-146
- North American NA-155
- North American NA-156
- North American NA-160
- North American NA-169
- North American NA-175
- North American NA-183
- North American NA-184
- North American NA-247
- North American NR-323
- North American NA-335
- North American NAC-60
- North American NAGPAW
- North American NR-349
- North American Harvard
- North American Sabreliner
- North American WS-300
- North American Yale
- North American Navion
- North American Navy Experimental Type A Intermediate Trainer

=== North American Rotorwerks ===
- North American Rotorwerks Pitbull Ultralight
- North American Rotorwerks Pitbull SS
- North American Rotorwerks Pitbull II

=== North Wing Design ===
- North Wing Apache
- North Wing Apache 582 Contour
- North Wing Apache 582 Mustang
- North Wing Apache ST
- North Wing ATF
- North Wing Maverick
- North Wing Maverick 103
- North Wing Maverick Mustang
- North Wing Maverick 2 Legend
- North Wing Maverick 2 RT
- North Wing Solairus
- North Wing Sport X2

=== Northeast ===
(Northeast Airways Inc (Conrad C Blom), 18 Elder St, Schenectady, NY, 1931: Amsterdam, NY)

- Northeast NA-1 CCB Special
- Northeast NA-2C Special
- Northeast NA-4R

=== Northern Aviatik Company ===
- Northern Aviatik Type 9
- Northern Aviatik Type 11
- Northern Aviatik Type 12
- Northern Aviatik Type 14
- Northern Aviatik Type 17

=== Northern ===
(Northern Aircraft Co, Alexandria, MN)

- Northern Cruisemaster 14-19-2

=== Northrop ===
(Northrop Corporation / Jack Northrop)

- Northrop A-9
- Northrop A-13
- Northrop A-16
- Northrop A-17
- Northrop A-33
- Northrop B-35
- Northrop B-49
- Northrop BQM-74 Chukar
- Northrop BQM-108
- Northrop BT
- Northrop B2T
- Northrop C-19 Alpha
- Northrop C-100 Gamma
- Northrop C-125 Raider
- Northrop F-5 Freedom Fighter
- Northrop RF-5 Tigereye
- Northrop F-15 Reporter
- Northrop F-17 Cobra
- Northrop F-20 Tigershark
- Northrop F-61 Black Widow / Northrop P-61 Black Widow
- Northrop F-89 Scorpion
- Northrop FT
- Northrop F2T Black Widow
- Northrop JB-1 Bat
- Northrop XP-56 Black Bullet
- Northrop P-79
- Northrop XP-948
- Northrop RT
- Northrop T-38 Talon
- Northrop X-4 Bantam
- Northrop X-21
- Northrop 2
- Northrop 3A
- Northrop 5
- Northrop 8A
- Northrop Alpha
- Northrop Avion Experimental
- Northrop Beta
- Northrop BXN
- Northrop Gamma
- Northrop Delta
- Northrop Flying Wing
- Northrop HL-10
- Northrop M2-F1
- Northrop M2-F2
- Northrop M2-F3
- Northrop MX-324
- Northrop MX-334
- Northrop MX-356
- Northrop MX-543
- Northrop MRF-54E
- Northrop N-1M
- Northrop N-2M
- Northrop N-3PB
- Northrop N-9M
- Northrop N-12
- Northrop N-14
- Northrop N-23 Pioneer
- Northrop N-156
- Northrop N-251
- Northrop N-309
- Northrop N-333
- Northrop N-336
- Northrop N-337
- Northrop N-340
- Northrop N-344
- Northrop N-353
- Northrop N-356
- Northrop N-369
- Northrop N-371
- Northrop N-381
- Northrop N-382
- Northrop Nomad
- Northrop NV-105
- Northrop NV-144
- Northrop Tacit Blue
- Northrop Grumman B-2 Spirit
- Northrop Grumman B-21 Raider
- Northrop Grumman E-2 Hawkeye
- Northrop Grumman E-8 Joint STARS
- Northrop Grumman E-10 MC2A
- Northrop Grumman F-27 Fury
- Northrop Grumman RQ-4 Global Hawk
- Northrop Grumman RQ-8A
- Northrop Grumman RQ-8B
- Northrop Grumman RQ-180
- Northrop Grumman MQ-8B Fire Scout
- Northrop Grumman MQ-8C Fire-X
- Northrop Grumman X-47 Pegasus
- Northrop Grumman X-47B
- Northrop Grumman Firebird
- Northrop Grumman NATF-23
- Northrop/McDonnell Douglas YF-23 Black Widow II

=== Northrup ===
(Russell Northrup/Northrop and James R Williams, Rochester, NY)

- Northrup Special

=== Northwest ===
(Northwest Aircraft & Motor Co (Pres: L F Duval), aka Clifford Aircraft Corp (gliders), 27 West & Commodore Way, Seattle. WA)

- Northwest Model A

=== Northwest Industries ===
(Edmonton, Alberta, Canada)

- Northwest Ranger

=== Northwest Polytechnic University ===
- Yan'an-1
- Yan'an-2 helicopter

=== Northwood ===
(Dr R C Northwood, Nassau Blvd Aerodrome, Long Island, NY)

- Northwood aeroplane

=== Notteghem ===
(Louis-Henri Notteghem)

- Notteghem LN.01

=== Nourse ===
(Wallace L Nourse & Victor Leighton, Kansas City, MO)

- Nourse 1926 Monoplane

=== Noury ===
(Noury Aircraft Ltd. / J.O.Noury)

- Noury T-65 Nouranda

=== Nova ===
(Nova Sp. z.o.o.)

- Nova Coden

=== Nova Performance Paragliders ===
(Innsbruck and later Terfens, Austria)

- Nova Aeron
- Nova Argon
- Nova Artax
- Nova Axon
- Nova Bion
- Nova Carbon
- Nova CXC
- Nova Factor
- Nova Ibex
- Nova Ion
- Nova Jamboo
- Nova Krypton
- Nova Mamboo
- Nova Mentor
- Nova Oryx
- Nova Phantom
- Nova Pheron
- Nova Philou
- Nova Phocus
- Nova Phönix
- Nova Phor
- Nova Phorus
- Nova Primax
- Nova Prion
- Nova RA
- Nova Radon
- Nova Rookie
- Nova Rotor
- Nova Shockwave
- Nova Speedmax
- Nova Susi
- Nova Susi Q
- Nova Syntax
- Nova Tatoo
- Nova Trend
- Nova Triton
- Nova Tycoon
- Nova X-ACT
- Nova Xenon
- Nova Xyon

=== Novaer ===
- Novaer U-Xc Stardream
- Novaer-Calidus B-250 Bader
- Novaer T-Xc

=== Novitchi ===
- Novitchi RG-6
- Novitchi RG-7

=== Nowotny ===
(Adam Nowotny)

- Nowotny N-y 4bis

=== Nozawa ===
(NozawaKoku Kenkyusho - Nozawa Aviation Research Institute)

- Nozawa Z-1
- Nozawa X-1

=== NPO Molniya ===
- Molniya-1

=== NSA ===
(National Sport Aircraft Inc, Burbank, CA)

- NSA Genie

=== NST-Machinenbau ===
(Werther, North Rhine-Westphalia, Germany)

- NST Minimum
- NST Minimum 1+1

=== NUAA ===
(Nanjing University of Aeronautics and Astronautics)

- FT300

=== Nungesser ===
(Charles Nungesser)

- Nungesser Nua-1
- L'hydravion Canard de Nungesser (similar in airframe configuration to the Gee Bee Model Q Ascender)

=== Nuri Demirağ ===
(Nuri Demirağ Aircraft Works), Turkey

- Nuri Demirağ Nu D.36
- Nuri Demirağ Nu D.38

=== Nurov-Elibekian ===
(N.K.Nurov and S.A.Elibekian)

- Nurov-Elibekian Avianito

=== Nurtanio ===
see: Nurtanio

=== Nuvoli ===
(Prospero Nuvoli, Turin, Italy - Laboratorio Artigianale Aeronautico)

- Nuvoli N.3 (40 hp Salmson)
- Nuvoli N.3/S (90 hp Salmson)
- Nuvoli N.5R (Pobjoy R)
- Nuvoli N.5RR (Pobjoy)
- Nuvoli N.5T (Pobjoy R)
- Nuvoli N.5Cab (Fiat A.70)
- Nuvoli N.5Aq Alta Quota Lab oratorio Artigianale Aeronautico Nuvoli
- Nuvoli ND 6.6

=== NuWaco ===
(NuWaco Aircraft Co Inc, Calhan CO)

- NuWaco T-10

=== NVI ===
(Nationale Vliegtuig Industrie)

- NVI F.K.29
- NVI F.K.31
- NVI F.K.32
- NVI F.K.33
- NVI F.K.34
- NVI F.K.35

=== NWT Co ===
(Charleston, ME)

- NWT Spruce Coupe

=== Nyge Aero ===
- Nyge Aero VLA-1

=== NZAI ===
- NZAI CT-4 Airtrainer
