= NV6 =

NV6 may refer to:

- NV6 engine
- NV_{6}, a minor planet, see List of minor planets: 23001–24000
- Nikitin NV-6, a single seat aerobatic biplane
- NV 6, U.S. Route 6 in Nevada
- NV6, a hybridpiano by Kawai
