= NIAI P-3 =

P-3

General information
- Type: Multi-purpose trainer
- National origin: USSR
- Manufacturer: NIAI (Naoochno-Issledovatel'skiy Aero-Institoot - scientific test aero-institute)
- Designer: Anatolii Georgievich Bedunkovich
- Number built: 1

History
- First flight: early 1934
- Developed from: NIAI LK-4

The P-3, (a.k.a. LIG-5 (Leningradskii Institoot Grazdahnskovo Vozdooshnovo Flota- Leningrad Institute civil air fleet), was a multi-purpose trainer aircraft designed and built in the USSR from 1936.

== Development ==
In 1930 the LIIPS ( - Leningrad institute for sail and communications engineers) formed a UK GVF ( - training centre for civil air fleet), in turn the UK GVF formed the NIAI (Naoochno-Issledovatel'skiy Aero-Institoot - scientific test aero-institute) which became the focus of several good design engineers who were given command of individual OKB (Osboye Konstrooktorskoye Byuro – personal design/construction bureau).

The P-3 was designed by Anatolii Georgievich Bedunkovich, an Engineer Colonel, was conceived as a more powerful and faster aircraft similar to the LK-4, able to be produced in several versions to carry out different tasks. The three variants tested were intended for military training of pilots and crewmen. Construction was of wood throughout with some fabric covering. Testing at Leningrad was successfully completed by February 1937 when the aircraft was transferred to NII VVS (Naoochno-Issledovatel'skiy Institoot Voyenno-Vozdooshnykh Seel – scientific test institute of the soviet air force), for further testing, a production order was anticipated but the prototype crashed irreparably, due to pilot error, and no production was authorised.

== Variants ==
- P-3DP – (Dvukmestnyi Polutoplan – two-seat sesquiplane) For training pilots and observers for R-5 and similar aircraft.
- P-3OB – (Odnomestnyi Biplan – single-seat biplane) For training pilots of I-15 and other biplane fighters: The upper wing centre-section was removed along with the side cabane struts and the rear cockpit was faired over.
- P-3ON– (Odnomestnyi Nizkoplan – single-seat low-wing monoplane) For training I-16 and other monoplane fighter pilots, the P-3 ON had a cantilever lower wing only and a smaller tailplane.

== Specifications (P-3DP) ==
Data from Gunston, Bill. "Encyclopaedia of Russian Aircraft 1875-1995". London:Osprey. 1995. ISBN 1-85532-405-9

General characteristics

- Crew: 2
- Length: 7.5 m (24 ft 7.25 in)
- Wingspan: 10.6 m (34 ft 9.33 in)
- Wing area: 30 m^{2} (323 sq ft)
- Empty weight: 1,100 kg (2,425 lb)
- Gross weight: 1,560 kg (3,439 lb)
- Powerplant: 1 × MG-31 , 223.8 kW (300 hp)

Performance

- Maximum speed: 157 km/h (97.5 mph, 84.7 kn)
- Range: 850 km (528 mi, 459 nmi)
- Service ceiling: 3,300 m (10,826 ft)
- Rate of climb: 2.7777 m/s (5,436.8 ft/min)

Armament

- 1 x 7.62mm ShKAS forward-firing fixed in the forward fuselage.
- 1 x 7,62mm ShKAS ona flexible mount in the rear cockpit.

== See also ==
Related lists

- List of aircraft
