= NIAI LK =

Soviet two-seat cabin aircraft

LK

General information
- Type: Two-seat Cabin Aircraft
- National origin: USSR
- Manufacturer: NIAI (Naoochno-Issledovatel'skiy Aero-Institoot – scientific research aero-institute)
- Designer: Grigorii Ivanovich Bakshayev
- Number built: 1

History
- First flight: August 1936

The LK (Leningradskii Komsomolyets – Leningrad young communist) was a two-seat cabin aircraft designed and built in the USSR from April 1936.

== Development ==
In 1930 the LIIPS ( – Leningrad institute for sail and communications engineers) formed a UK GVF ( – training centre for civil air fleet), in turn the UK GVF formed the NIAI (Naoochno-Issledovatel'skiy Aero-Institoot – scientific research aero-institute) which became the focus of several good design engineers who were given command of individual OKB (Osoboye Konstrooktorskoye Byuro – personal design/construction bureau). One of the most prolific designers at NIAI was Grigorii Ivanovich Bakshayev, who was assigned the lead in the design of the LK two-seat sport aircraft in 1936. Constructed from welded steel truss fuselage and wooden wings, the low-wing LK had a fixed tail-wheel undercarriage, a tandem two-seat greenhouse cockpit, and was powered by a single M-11 radial engine. Innovations on the LK included relatively large end-plates on the wings and ''interceptor'' spoiler type roll controls extending over the top surface of the wings. The sole prototype LK was completed in July 1936, flight tests began in August 1936, and the LK also carried out a long-range flight to Moscow.

== Variants ==
- LIG-8 – The LIG-8 was derived from the LK with a re-stressed structure, a 300 hp (223.7 kW) MG-31 engine and a five-seat cabin. Flight testing began in 1937, and a small number were produced. Specifications for the LIG-8 were very similar to the LK but showed a marked increase in maximum speed, (245 km/h / 152 mph).

== Specifications (LK) ==
Data from Gunston, Bill. "Encyclopaedia of Russian Aircraft 1875–1995". London:Osprey. 1995. ISBN 1-85532-405-9

General characteristics

- Crew: 1
- Capacity: 1
- Length: 6.5 m (21 ft 4 in)
- Wingspan: 10 m (32 ft 9.75 in)
- Wing area: 15.5 m^{2} (167 sq ft)
- Empty weight: 740 kg (1,631 lb)
- Gross weight: 1,100 kg (2,425 lb)
- Powerplant: 1 × M-11 , 85.75 kW (115 hp)

Performance

- Maximum speed: 175 km/h (109 mph, 95 kn)
- Range: 750 km (470 mi, 410 nmi)

== See also ==
Related lists

- List of aircraft
