= Nikitin NV-5 =

Soviet aircraft

NV-5

General information
- Type: Trainer
- National origin: USSR
- Manufacturer: Nikitin
- Designer: Vasilii Vasilyevich Nikitin
- Number built: 15 (maybe more)

History
- First flight: Early 1937

The Nikitin NV-5, was a tandem-seat trainer aircraft designed and produced in the USSR from 1934.

== Development ==
In 1934 Osaviakhim (Society for assistance to aviation and chemical industry), and AVIAVnito (Aviation Department of Vnito, all union scientific and technical research organisation), opened a competition for designing and building a safe aeroplane. Nikitin designed a small biplane with tandem seating, I-type wide chord inter-plane struts, rubber shock-isolating engine mounts and small semi-balloon tyres. The fuselage was built up from welded 30KhGSA steel tubing with plywood covering and the wings were constructed from wood with fabric covering. The first prototype had a Licence-built Renault MV-4 inverted in-line engine, but later variants used M-11 or MG-11 radial engines.

The NV-5 won the Osavaiakhim/ AVIAVnito competition in 1937 and was prepared for production, as the U-5, for Osaviakhim and UVVS. One U-5 was modified with a ShKAS machine gun under the starboard wing and four under-wing RS-82 rockets.

The most significant variant of the U-5 was the LSh (Legkii Shtabno – light staff aircraft), built in 1942 at the request of the Moscow Defence HQ, this aircraft was used operationally on liaison and special missions from Leningrad to the Caucasus mountains. With a much more powerful MG-31F engine, Polikarpov I-153 upper wing, enclosed cabin, toughened rear cockpit with bench seating for two and aluminium lining, the LSh had excellent STOL and range performance.

== Variants ==
- NV-5 - Initial prototype with licence built Renault MV-4 engine.
- NV-5bis – Shvetsov MG-11F powered NV-5. (one built)
- U-5 – Prototype and four production aircraft with Shvetsov M-11 or Shvetsov M-11G engines. (Five built)
- U-5 bis – Five built 1939 for UVVS with Shvetsov MG-11F engines
- LSh – One LSh built in 1942 (a.k.a. U-5/MG-31) with a 330 hp (246.01 kW) MG-31F.

== Units using this aircraft/Operators (choose) ==
- UVVS - Soviet Air Force Training
- Osavaiakhim
- (LSh) - Moscow Defence HQ

== Specifications (U-5) ==
Data from Gunston, Bill. "Encyclopaedia of Russian Aircraft 1875-1995". London:Osprey. 1995. ISBN 1-85532-405-9

General characteristics

- Crew: 2
- Length: 7.62 m (25 ft 2.33 in)
- Wingspan: 9.84 m (32 ft 3.5 in)
- Wing area: 25.53 m^{2} (275 sq ft)
- Empty weight: 711 kg (1,567.49 lb)
- Gross weight: 974 kg (2,147.3 lb)
- Powerplant: 1 × M-11G , 85.75 kW (115 hp)

Performance

- Maximum speed: 181 km/h (112.47 mph, 97.73 kn)
- Endurance: 3 hours
- Rate of climb: 5.55 m/s (1,093.6 ft/min)

== See also ==
Aircraft of comparable role, configuration, and era

- Polikarpov U-2/Po-2
- Avro Avian
- de Havilland D.H. 82a Tiger Moth

Related lists

- List of aircraft
