= Nowotny N-y 4bis =

N-y 4bis
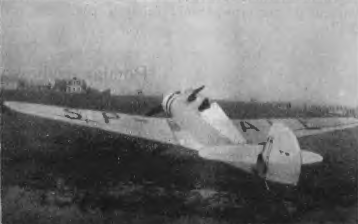

General information
- Type: Two seat trainer
- National origin: Poland
- Designer: Adam Nowotny
- Number built: 1

History
- First flight: April 1934

The Nowotny N-y 4bis was a tandem two-seat light aircraft, built in Poland, as a step towards a very light, low-powered training aircraft for flying clubs. Its designer was killed in a glider soon after the first flight of his trainer and its development was abandoned.

== Design and development ==
In 1932 Adam Nowotny designed a low-powered, lightweight two-seat trainer, designated the Nowotny N-y 4, intended to help glider pilots convert to powered flight. The Lwów Aeroclub were willing to finance its building but no suitably low power engine was available. As the club had an elderly, 85 hp (63 kW) Walter NZ radial engine, Nowotny produced a completely new design incorporating it. Despite the changes, Nowotny designated it the Nowotny N-y 4bis as he regarded it as a step towards his conversion trainer.

The Lwów Aeroclub had the design tested in the local university's wind tunnel and in May 1933 contracted its construction to the C.W.A., a short-lived commercial venture of the Lublin Aeroclub. After C.W.A.'s collapse, the Nowotny N-y 4bis was completed in the Lublin factory of E. Plage & T. Laśkiewicz. Its first flight, piloted by its designer, was in April 1934.

The N-y 4bis was a monoplane with a cantilever low wing built around a single birch box spar. Beyond a short centre section, an integral part of the fuselage with a carefully faired trailing edge, the wing tapered strongly in both plan and section out to rounded tips and had marked dihedral. Part of the wing was plywood covered, with fabric elsewhere. The ailerons, which reached the wing tips, were both slotted and balanced.

The Walter engine, with its fuel tank in the wing centre section, was enclosed with a Townend ring-type cowling. Behind it, the rectangular section fuselage was built from welded steel tubes and fabric covered apart from a rounded plywood upper decking which began immediately behind the engine, rising to fair-in the two tandem cockpits and provide them with headrests. Both cockpits, with the instructor's raised at the rear, were over the wing and fitted with dual control. Behind the cockpits the fuselage structure was internally wire-braced. The small, trapezoidal fin of the N-y 4bis had a steel frame and was an integral part of the fuselage. It was ply-covered but the very generous, rounded, balanced rudder, which reached down to the keel, was fabric covered like the rest of the empennage. Its horizontal tail was ground-adjustable and tapered in plan to rounded tips, with unbalanced elevators separated by a gap to allow rudder movement.

The undercarriage was conventional, with fixed mainwheels and a tailskid. The wheels were on split axles from the lower central fuselage; its landing legs, incorporating rubber disk shock absorbers, and drag struts were attached to the lower longerons.

Early tests showed the N-y 4bis handled well and out-performed estimates. Before it could go for official certification Nowotny died in a glider accident on 13 July 1934 and the aircraft was abandoned.

== Specifications ==
Data from J. Cynk (1971} except where noted. Performance estimated.

General characteristics

- Crew: Two
- Length: 8.15 m (26 ft 9 in)
- Wingspan: 11.4 m (37 ft 5 in)
- Height: 2.3 m (7 ft 7 in)
- Wing area: 16 m^{2} (170 sq ft)
- Airfoil: Gôttingen Gô 679
- Empty weight: 490 kg (1,080 lb)
- Gross weight: 750 kg (1,653 lb)
- Fuel capacity: 120 L (26 imp gal; 32 US gal)
- Powerplant: 1 × Walter NZ 7-cylinder radial engine, 63 kW (85 hp)
- Propellers: 2-bladed Szomański

Performance

- Maximum speed: 170 km/h (110 mph, 92 kn)
- Cruise speed: 150 km/h (150 mph, 130 kn)
- Range: 800 km (500 mi, 430 nmi)
- Service ceiling: 4,200 m (13,800 ft)
- Rate of climb: 3.9 m/s (770 ft/min)
- Landing speed: 85 km/h (53 mph; 46 kn)
