= Nicollier HN 500 Bengali =

HN 500 Bengali

General information
- Type: Two seat light aircraft
- National origin: France
- Designer: Henri Nicollier
- Number built: 1

History
- First flight: 9 June 1988

The Nicollier HN 500 Bengali is a single engine French light aircraft built in France in the 1980s. It seats two in side-by-side configuration. Only one was built, flying for the first time in 1988; it remains active with a French preservation group.

== Design and development ==
The Bengali is a conventionally laid out, all wood, cantilever low wing monoplane with side by side seating. The wing has a single spar and is made in one piece; its leading edge and part of the root is skinned with plywood and the whole wing, including the ailerons and two position flaps covered with Dacron. Dihedral is constant over the span and there is 2.16° of washout. The wing is tapered in plan with less sweepback outboard.

Apart from a glass fibre engine cowling the fuselage is a trapezoidal cross-section semi-monocoque with plywood stressed skin and rounded dorsal decking. The Bengali's side-by-side cabin, fitted with dual controls, is accessed via two upward opening, centrally hinged transparent sections. There is baggage space behind the seats. The swept fin is an integral part of the fuselage and the tailplane, set at mid-fuselage height, is of the semi-all-moving type with automatic tabs on both trailing edges.

The Bengali is powered by a 75 kW (100 hp) Rolls-Royce built Continental O-200 flat four piston engine driving a fixed pitch propeller. The main fuel tank, holding 67 L (14.8 Imp gal) is in the fuselage under the baggage space, with more fuel held in a pair of leading edge wing tanks. It has a fixed tricycle undercarriage. The mainwheels have hydraulic brakes and the nosewheel is self centring though not steerable.

== Operational history ==
The Bengali first flew on 9 June 1988, though construction was "nearing completion" in early 1981. Only one was built as Nicollier chose at an early stage not to sell plans. Shortly after its first flight this aircraft, F-PXHN, attended the RSA Internal held at Moulins-Montbligny between 29 and 31 July 1988. It later became F-PFHN and is currently (2012) with the Groupement pour la Préservation du Patrimoine Aéronautique (GPPA) at the Musée Regional de l'Air, Angers remaining in flying condition.

== Specifications ==
Data from Jane's All the World's Aircraft 1981/82 All performance figures estimated at maximum take-off weight.

General characteristics

- Capacity: Two
- Length: 6.20 m (20 ft 4 in)
- Wingspan: 8.39 m (27 ft 6 in)
- Wing area: 11.25 m^{2} (121.1 sq ft)
- Aspect ratio: 6.25
- Airfoil: NACA 22000 series
- Empty weight: 395 kg (871 lb)
- Max takeoff weight: 650 kg (1,433 lb)
- Fuel capacity: 121 L (27 Imp gal; 32 US gal)
- Powerplant: 1 × Rolls-Royce Continental O-200-A air cooled flat four, 75 kW (100 hp)
- Propellers: 2-bladed EVRA D11.28.8C, 1.76 m (5 ft 9 in) diameter wooden, fixed pitch

Performance

- Maximum speed: 240 km/h (150 mph, 130 kn) at sea level
- Cruise speed: 210 km/h (130 mph, 110 kn) normal, with wheel fairings
- Stall speed: 85 km/h (53 mph, 46 kn) flaps down
- Never exceed speed: 340 km/h (210 mph, 180 kn)
- Range: 1,000 km (620 mi, 540 nmi) approximate, with full fuel
- g limits: +4.4/-2.2
- Rate of climb: 4.0 m/s (790 ft/min)

Avionics
VFR standard
