= Nagler NH-160 =

General information
- Type: Helicopter
- Manufacturer: Nagler Helicopter Company
- Designer: Bruno Nagler
- Number built: 1

History
- First flight: December 1955

The Nagler NH-160 was an experimental single seat helicopter with counter-rotating blades.

== Design and development ==
Bruno Nagler began wind tunnel experiments into helicopter design in 1926 and developed the first practical swash plate. The Nagler NH-120 was developed to test the idea of counteracting rotor torque with a small separate rotor. The engine was mounted above the main rotor on a shaft, and the anti-torque rotor was mounted above both. The NH-160 had a conventional helicopter engine and rotor layout, with the exception of the smaller anti-torque rotor mounted under the fuselage between the landing skids. Yaw control on both was effected through changing the difference in rotational speed between the two rotors, using a series of disc brakes. A small tail surface provided directional stability in forward flight. The smaller rotor would spin at a higher rpm, with about 60 percent of the load,. the main rotor being adjustable for lift control.

The NH-160 proved to be much more stable in tests than the NH-120 which had a higher center of gravity.

== Variants ==
NH-120
Helicopter with engine mounted above rotor with a counter-torque rotor mounted above the engine.
NH-170
An enclosed two-seat side-by-side design with a shrouded lower counter-torque rotor.

== Specifications (Nagler NH-160) ==
Data from Sport Aviation

General characteristics

- Capacity: one
- Gross weight: 700 lb (318 kg)
- Powerplant: 1 × McCullough Model 4318 , 72 hp (54 kW)
- Main rotor diameter: 2 × 20 ft (6.1 m)
- Main rotor area: 314 sq ft (29.2 m^{2}) Lower rotor 8ft 3 blades

Performance

- Cruise speed: 104 kn (119 mph, 192 km/h)

== See also ==
Related development

- XNH I Heliglider
- Convertocrapt 130
- Nagler HC-1 Heligyro
- Nagler VG1 Vertigyro
