= NIAI OSh =

USSR attack aircraft

OSh

General information
- Type: Attack
- National origin: USSR
- Manufacturer: NIAI (Naoochno-Issledovatel'skiy Aero-Institoot - scientific test aero-institute)
- Designer: Anatolii Georgievich Bedunkovich

The Osh (Odnomotornyi Shturmovik – single-engined attack) was an attack aircraft designed in the USSR from 1939.

== Development ==
In 1930, the LIIPS (- Leningrad Institute for Sail and Communications Engineers) formed a UK GVF, a training centre for civil air fleet. In turn, the UK GVF formed the NIAI (Naoochno-Issledovatel'skiy Aero-Institoot - scientific test aero-institute) which became the focus of several good design engineers who were given command of individual OKB (Osboye Konstrooktorskoye Byuro – personal design/construction bureau).

In 1939, Anatolii Georgievich Bedunkovich designed a large single-engined twin-boomed attack aircraft, it was to be constructed from stressed skin light-alloy. This large aircraft was to carry a heavy cannon armament including a turret in the rear of the fuselage nacelle, which also housed the single engine, driving propellers in the nose of each tail-boom, through shafts and gearboxes. There is no record of this interesting project having been built or flown.

== See also ==
Aircraft of comparable role, configuration, and era

- Sukhoi Su-12

Related lists

- List of aircraft
