= NIAI RK =

Soviet light aircraft

RK

General information
- Type: Telescopic Wing Research Aircraft
- National origin: USSR
- Manufacturer: NIAI (Naoochno-Issledovatel'skiy Aero-Institoot - scientific test aero-institute)
- Designer: Grigorii Ivanovich Bakshayev
- Number built: 1

History
- First flight: 1937

The RK (Razdvizhnoye Krylo – extending wing) (a.k.a. LIG-7) was a two-seat cabin aircraft designed and built in the USSR from April 1936.

== Development ==
In 1930 the LIIPS ( - Leningrad institute for sail and communications engineers) formed a UK GVF ( - training centre for civil air fleet), in turn the UK GVF formed the NIAI (Naoochno-Issledovatel'skiy Aero-Institoot - scientific test aero-institute) which became the focus of several good design engineers who were given command of individual OKB (Osboye Konstrooktorskoye Byuro – personal design/construction bureau).

Along with contemporary aircraft designers, in the USSR and abroad, Grigorii Ivanovich Bakshayev was interested in the concept of variable geometry aircraft, where the size and/or shape of wings are altered according to the stage of flight, or desired characteristics. One methods of achieving this was with a telescopic wing, where wing sections of bigger aerofoil section and area are telescoped out over the original wing. He designed the RK to use a telescopic wing with six sections, of gradually increasing size, extending outwards from the fuselage to the demands of the pilot.

The airframe of the RK was a simple structure of steel tube fuselage and a wire braced monoplane wing of constant M-6 section constructed of wood. The extending wing sections were each 460 mm wide and were extended by the observer in the rear cockpit operating a hand-crank connected to cables via a pulley system to pull each section out in turn, with each section pulling the next behind it. Successful flight tests starting in 1937 led to authorisation for a fighter with telescopic wings to be designed and built; The RK-I (Razdvizhnoye Krylo - Istrebitel – extending wing fighter).

== Specifications (RK) ==
Data from Gunston, Bill. "Encyclopaedia of Russian Aircraft 1875-1995". London:Osprey. 1995. ISBN 1-85532-405-9

General characteristics

- Crew: 2
- Length: 7.34 m (24 ft 1 in)
- Wingspan: 11.3 m (37 ft 0.75 in)
- Wing area: 16.56 to 23.85 m^{2} (178.25 to 256.72 sq ft)
- Empty weight: 667 kg (1,470 lb)
- Gross weight: 897 kg (1,978 lb)
- Powerplant: 1 × Shvetsov M-11 , 86 kW (115 hp)

Performance

- Maximum speed: 150 km/h (93 mph, 81 kn)

== See also ==
Aircraft of comparable role, configuration, and era

- Gérin 'Varivol'

Related lists

- List of aircraft
