= Nordflug FB 1 =

General information
- Type: Two seat flying boat for sport and training
- National origin: Germany
- Manufacturer: Norddeutsche Flugzeugwerke
- Designer: E.B Harder
- Number built: 1

History
- First flight: c.1920

The Nordflug FB 1 was a small, parasol wing flying boat with two seats in tandem, sponsons for stability on the water and a low-powered, wing mounted engine.

== Design and development ==
Norddeutsche Flugzeugwerke (NFW) produced the Nordflug FB 1, designed by E.B Harder, in 1920. Its three part, two spar wing had constant chord over most of the span out to blunted, angled tips. The outer part of these tips rotated to provide lateral control in place of conventional ailerons. The central section, an integral part of the rest of the fuselage structure, was held above the hull by a pair of transverse W-struts directly joined longitudinally along the centre-line. Their outer struts braced the ends of the centre-section spars to the upper fuselage longerons. The wings thinned outwards from their upper sides, providing slight anhedral.

The FB 1 was powered by a 50–60 hp (37–45 kW), five-cylinder, air-cooled, Siemens-Halske Sh 4 radial engine mounted centrally on top of the wing. Its uncowled cylinders projected both above and below the leading edge and a tapered cowling containing the fuel tank reached aft to about 2/3 chord.

Its fuselage was wooden and flat-sided with a nose that was rather pointed in profile, the underside curving upwards to meet a horizontal top side. It had a single step planing bottom and was unusual in being concave in section rather than the V-section of most such hulls; the step was far aft, behind the two tandem, open cockpits. The pilot sat well behind the trailing edge with pupil or passenger at about 1/3 chord, under and between the spars. Short, stabilizing sponsons were located below the forward cockpit.

Narrowing aft in profile to a horizontal wedge, the fuselage carried a straight-edged tailplane with balanced elevators. The fin was approximately quadrantal, mounting a large, blunted rectangular rudder.

== Operational history ==
The FB 1 was on display at the 1923 Gothenburg International Aero Exhibition. This event was part of the Gothenburg Exhibition and was the first aeronautical show after World War I with German participation. Only one was built before Nordflug ceased trading because of the economic situation.

== Specifications ==
Data from Flight, 16 August 1923 (Note: Fred Gütschow gives very different dimensions (span 7.30 m, length 5.00 m) but Flight's data is contemporary. Their 3-view has a scale attached and the dimensions taken off it agree with the text.)

General characteristics

- Crew: two
- Length: 6.55 m (21 ft 6 in)
- Wingspan: 10.29 m (33 ft 9 in)
- Wing area: 13.89 m^{2} (149.5 sq ft)
- Empty weight: 305 kg (672 lb)
- Gross weight: 554 kg (1,222 lb)
- Powerplant: 1 × Siemens-Halske Sh 4 five-cylinder, air-cooled, radial, 37–45 kW (50–60 hp)
- Propellers: 2-bladed

Performance

- Maximum speed: 100 km/h (62 mph, 54 kn)
