= NAU Black-headed Gull =

General information
- Type: two-seat ultralight
- National origin: China
- Manufacturer: Nanchang Aviation University (NAU)
- Number built: at least 2

History
- First flight: 8-12 June 2011

The NAU Black-headed Gull is a Chinese two seat, high wing ultralight first flown in 2011.

== Design and development ==
Design of the Black-headed Gull began at Nanchang Aviation University (NAU) in 2008. It first appeared in public, unflown, in November 2010 at Airshow China, held at Zhuhai. The first flight was made in early June 2011.

Its cantilever wing is rectangular in plan and is mounted with 2.5° of dihedral. Ailerons and flaps fill the whole trailing edge. The flaps are Fowler-type and can be set, electrically, at deflections of 0°, 15° or 30°.

The fuselage is built with a mixture of carbon (9%) and glass fibre materials with epoxy sandwich. Its Rotax 912 engine is conventionally nose-mounted and drives a three-bladed propeller. The cabin is largely under the wing, with each of its side-by-side seats accessed by an upward-hinged side door. Dual control is fitted. The fuselage tapers rapidly to the rear, ending in a swept, approximately parallelogram profile fin and rudder. The Black-headed Gull has a T-tail. Its rectangular plan, all-moving elevator has a central trim tab.

The Gull has tricycle gear with its mainwheels on arched, cantilever carbon fibre, faired legs. The nose leg is similarly faired. All three wheels are semi-enclosed in fairings.

A ballistic recovery parachute is fitted.

== Operational history ==
At Airshow China it was described as suitable for agricultural and forestry work as well as aerial photography. It could also serve as a trainer. Only two examples are known to have been completed by 2014, though there were reports of interest in Hong Kong and Taiwan.

== Specifications ==
Data from Jane's All the World's Aircraft 2015-16 All performance figures are estimates.

General characteristics

- Crew: two
- Length: 5.955 m (19 ft 6 in)
- Wingspan: 8.465 m (27 ft 9 in)
- Height: 1.985 m (6 ft 6 in)
- Wing area: 8.565 m^{2} (92.19 sq ft)
- Aspect ratio: 8.4
- Airfoil: NACA 2415
- Empty weight: 280 kg (617 lb)
- Max takeoff weight: 500 kg (1,102 lb) normal
- Fuel capacity: 80 L (18 imp gal; 21 US gal) standard
- Powerplant: 1 × Rotax 512 ULS flat-four engine, 73.5 kW (98.6 hp)
- Propellers: 3-bladed, 1.585 m (5 ft 2 in) diameter

Performance

- Maximum speed: 230 km/h (140 mph, 120 kn)
- Cruise speed: 200 km/h (120 mph, 110 kn)
- Stall speed: 84 km/h (52 mph, 45 kn)
- Never exceed speed: 250 km/h (160 mph, 130 kn)
- Range: 1,000 km (620 mi, 540 nmi)
- Service ceiling: 5,000 m (16,000 ft)
- Rate of climb: 3.47 m/s (683 ft/min)
- Take-off distance: 140 m (460 ft)
- Landing run: 200 m (660 ft)

Avionics

- GPS navigation
- Standard VFR
- Two-screen EFIS
