= Nakajima–Fokker ambulance aircraft =

Japanese ambulance aircraft

General information
- Type: Ambulance aircraft
- National origin: Netherlands, U.S. and Japan
- Manufacturer: Nakajima
- Number built: 2

History
- First flight: 1932

The two Nakajima–Fokker ambulance aircraft were Army medical modifications of production, Nakajima-built and engined, Fokker Super Universals. Both were funded by public subscription.

== Design and development ==
The Japanese army first became interested in the potential of ambulance aircraft during the Manchurian incident of 1931, resulting in the modification of a Kawasaki-built Dornier Merkur passenger aircraft. Its publicly-funded success led to two similar conversions of Nakajima-built Fokker Super Universals, the first in 1932 and the second six years later, again publicly-funded. The cabins, which normally held six passengers, were redesigned by Army Dr Yoshinobu Teraj, a longterm advocate of ambulance aircraft. They could accommodate two stretcher and two seated patients plus a medical attendant or surgeon. Oxygen and intravenous feeding supplies were provided.

Apart from the new cabin the Nakajima built Fokker Super Universals had the same design, structure and dimensions as the U.S.-built originals but differed in their engines, weights and performances. The US version had a 410 hp (310 kW) Pratt & Whitney Wasp but the Nakajima Super Universal replaced this with a 420 hp (310 kW) Nakajima Jupiter early in production, then later a 460 hp (340 kW) Nakajima Kotobuki 2-kai-1. Similarly, the first ambulance had a Jupiter and the second a Kotobuki. Its greater power increased the second aircraft's cruising speed by 27% but its fuel consumption decreased the range by 14%.

== Operational history ==
The individual histories of these two individual ambulance aircraft are not known but air ambulances played a vital role following the Manchurian Incident, when the first was available. The Second Sino-Japanese War broke out in 1937, shortly before the donation of the second.

== Specifications (Kotobuki-powered) ==
Data from Japanese Aircraft 1910-1941

General characteristics

- Crew: two plus one medical attendant in cabin
- Capacity: two stretcher patients and two seated
- Length: 11.09 m (36 ft 5 in)
- Wingspan: 15.43 m (50 ft 7 in)
- Height: 2.82 m (9 ft 3 in)
- Wing area: 34.37 m^{2} (370.0 sq ft)
- Empty weight: 1,720 kg (3,792 lb)
- Gross weight: 2,700 kg (5,952 lb)
- Powerplant: 1 × Nakajima Kotobuki 2-kai-1 nine cylinder radial, 340 kW (460 hp)
- Propellers: 2-bladed metal, fixed pitch

Performance

- Maximum speed: 248 km/h (154 mph, 134 kn)
- Cruise speed: 217 km/h (135 mph, 117 kn)
- Range: 1,000 km (560 mi, 490 nmi)
- Service ceiling: 6,000 m (20,000 ft)
- Time to altitude: 7 min 18 s to 1,000 m (3,300 ft)
