= Nieuport-Delage NiD 32 =

French single-seater fighter

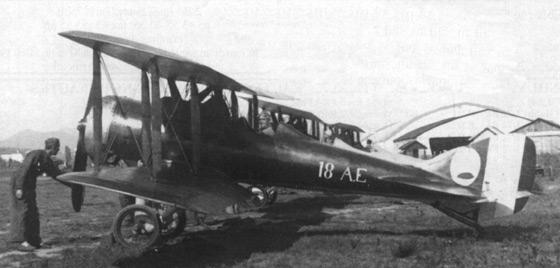
- Nieuport-Delage NiD 32 RH

General information
- Type: Fighter aircraft
- National origin: France
- Manufacturer: Nieuport-Delage
- Number built: 10

History
- First flight: 1920

The Nieuport-Delage NiD 32 was a French single-seater fighter produced by Nieuport during the period between the two World Wars. The aircraft was designed in response to a request from the French Navy for an aircraft capable of launching from a platform: the NiD 32 competed with other planes, such as the Hanriot HD.12 and the SPAD S.XV. In addition to the NiD 32, Nieuport also submitted the NiD 29. The Navy selected the Nieuport NiD 32, and set about to test it in March 1920 on a platform. The results were disappointing, as the platform could barely support the aircraft, even when it was unarmed.

== Specifications (NiD-32RH) ==
Data from Nieuport-Delage NiD-32RH

General characteristics

- Crew: 1
- Length: 6.7 m (22 ft 0 in)
- Wingspan: 9.7 m (31 ft 10 in)
- Height: 2.48 m (8 ft 2 in)
- Wing area: 30 m^{2} (320 sq ft)
- Empty weight: 603 kg (1,329 lb)
- Gross weight: 857 kg (1,889 lb)
- Powerplant: 1 × Le Rhône 9R 9-cyl. air-cooled rotary piston engine, 130 kW (180 hp)

Performance

- Maximum speed: 193 km/h (120 mph, 104 kn)
- Cruise speed: 150 km/h (93 mph, 81 kn)
- Range: 600 km (370 mi, 320 nmi)
- Service ceiling: 6,000 m (20,000 ft)
- Time to altitude: 5,000 m (16,000 ft) in 24 minutes

Armament
2 × 7.7 mm (0.303 in) Vickers machine guns

== Bibliography ==
- Cortet, Pierre (May 1995). "Le Nieuport 32RH". Avions: Toute l'aéronautique et son histoire (in French) (26): 18–20. ISSN 1243-8650.
