= NIAI LK-1 =

LK-1

General information
- Type: Transport
- National origin: USSR
- Manufacturer: NIAI
- Designer: Alexei Ivanovich Lisichkin and Vladimir Fedorovich Rentel
- Number built: 21

History
- First flight: May 1933

The LK-1 (Leningradskii Kombinat - Leningrad combine), (a.k.a. Fanera-2 – "Plywood no.2"), (a.k.a. NIAI-1) was a blended wing four-seat cabin aircraft designed and built in the USSR from 1933.

== Development ==
In 1930 the LIIPS (" Leningrad institute for sail and communications engineers") formed a UK GVF ( training centre for civil air fleet), and in turn the UK GVF formed the NIAI (Naoochno-Issledovatel'skiy Aero-Institoot (NIAI, "scientific test aero-institute") which became the focus of several good design engineers who were given command of individual OKB (Osboye Konstrooktorskoye Byuro – personal design/construction bureau).

Lisichkin and Rentel designed the LK-1 in an attempt to build a very efficient small transport aircraft with the wing blending into the fuselage, forming the cockpit and cabin, with seats for three passengers and one pilot with extensive glazing. Construction was all of wood/plywood, with a conventional single spar wing with plywood covering. The engine, with Townend ring cowling, was fitted on the centre-line between the cockpits which gave the pilot an asymmetrical view through the leading edge glazing. The fixed tricycle undercarriage was fitted with spats to reduce drag.

Flight trials at Leningrad and state acceptance tests at the NII GVF(Naoochno-Issledovatel'skiy Institoot Grazdahnskovo Vozdooshnovo Flota - "scientific test institute for civil air fleet"), in Moscow, were very successful and an order for twenty production aircraft with modified tails, spats removed, no Townend ring, and other modifications was placed, for use by Aeroflot inside the USSR and the Arctic.

== Variants ==
- NIAI-1P – (Poplavkoviy – with floats), at least one aircraft fitted with twin floats.

== Operators ==
Soviet Union

- Aeroflot

== Specifications (LK-1 - production) ==
Data from Encyclopaedia of Russian Aircraft 1875-1995

General characteristics

- Crew: 1
- Capacity: 3
- Length: 8.87 m (29 ft 1.25 in)
- Wingspan: 12.47 m (40 ft 11 in)
- Wing area: 27.6 m^{2} (297 sq ft)
- Empty weight: 746 kg (1,645 lb)
- Gross weight: 1,160 kg (2,557 lb)
- Powerplant: 1 × M-11 , 74.6 kW (100 hp)

Performance

- Maximum speed: 154 km/h (96 mph, 83 kn)
- Range: 850 km (528 mi, 459 nmi)
- Service ceiling: 3,370 m (11,000 ft)
- Rate of climb: 1.67 m/s (328 ft/min)

== See also ==
Aircraft of comparable role, configuration, and era

- Caudron Simoun

Related lists

- List of aircraft
