= Nicollier Menestrel =

French homebuilt aircraft

Menestrel
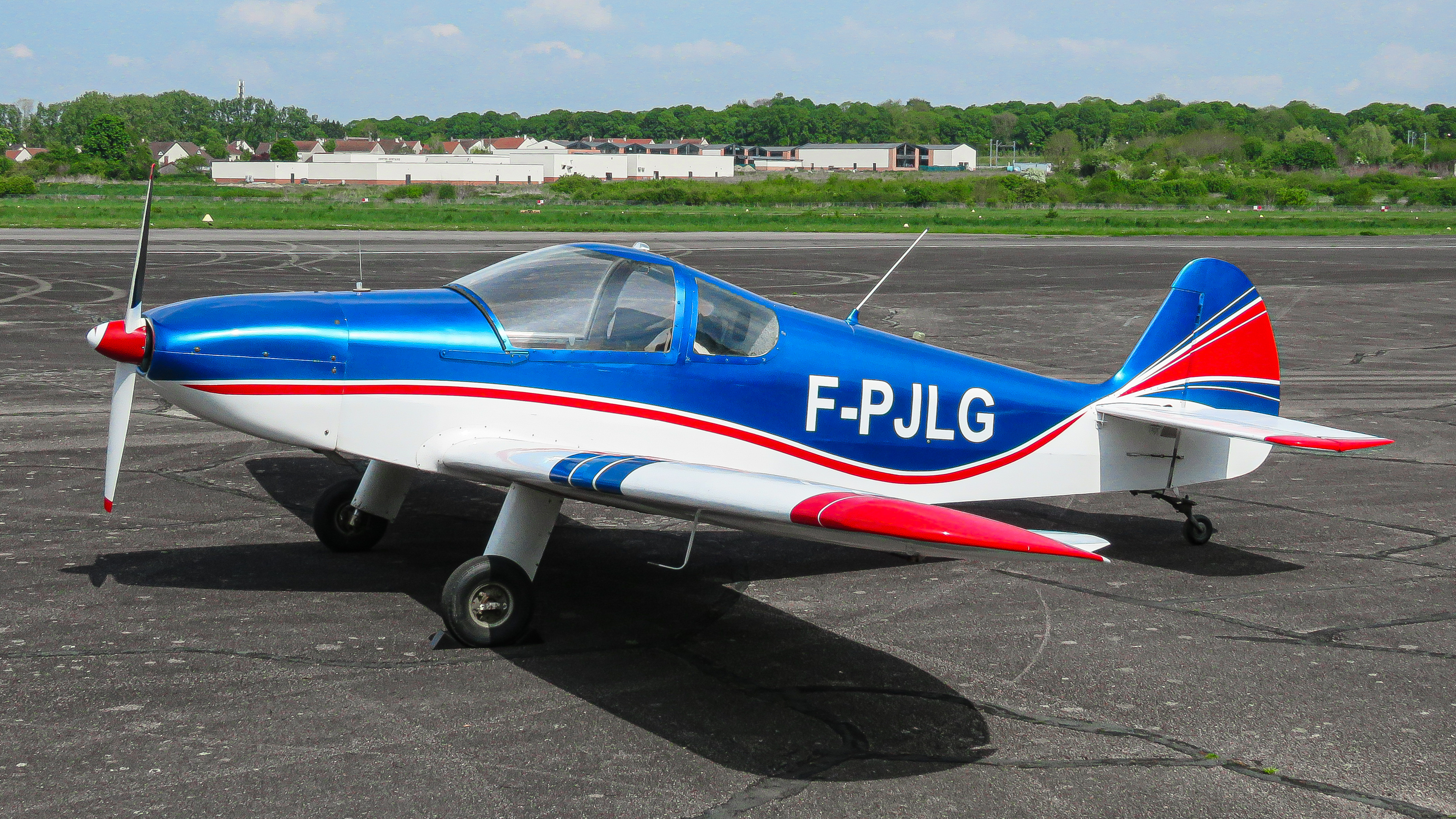
- Nicollier HN-700 Menestrel at St. Cyr Aerodrome

General information
- Type: Homebuilt aircraft
- National origin: France
- Designer: Henri Nicollier
- Number built: More than 95

History
- First flight: 25 November 1962

The Nicollier Menestrel family of French homebuilt low-wing single-engine light aircraft includes both single- and two-seat variants and a wide choice of engines. First flown in 1962, nearly 100 have been built and others remain under construction.

== Design and development ==
The Menestrel (en: Minstrel), a single-engine low-wing cantilever monoplane, was designed for homebuilders. Three variants have appeared over the course of about 27 years: the original single-seat HN 433 Menestrel flew in 1962, the more powerful HN 434 Super Menestrel in 1985 and the larger two-seat HN 700/1 Menestrel II in 1989.

All Menestrel variants are wooden framed and fabric covered. The wing is built around a single spar and has constant chord to mid span, with semi-elliptical outer panels. There are no flaps fitted on the single seat variants, though they are an option on the Menestrel II. The fin and rudder are curved, the rudder having a horn balance. The tailplane is mounted on the top of the fuselage.

The fuselage is structurally of simple square section, with a curved decking aft of the cockpit. The latter was originally open but the prototype later flew with a smooth plexiglass canopy that merged into the decking. The Menestrel II has side by side seating. Most Menestrels have a tailskid or, later, tailwheel undercarriage with cantilever main legs bearing Vespa scooter wheels. Many Menestrels have faired legs and spatted wheels. At least one Menestrel II, with the type number HN 701TM, uses a tricycle undercarriage.

Menestrels have been powered by a variety of engines, mostly variants of the Volkswagen flat-4 engine. Early versions of these were entirely air-cooled, but more recently the cylinder heads have been water-cooled. Some early Menestrels with air-cooled engines have exposed cylinder heads for cooling but more have semi-cylindrical, bulged fairings to enclose them. The water-cooled engines used in the Menestrel II have cowlings which enclose the whole engine without additional fairings, with an air intake behind the propeller. The first HN 433 Menestrel had a 22 kW (30 hp) 1.3 L engine; later HN 433s have had engines in the 22-37 kW (30-50 hp) power range. Super Menestrels have used 1.6 L engines, producing powers of 26-49 kW (35-65 hp). The HN 700 Menestrel II uses one of two Limbach engines of 2.0 L or 2.4 L capacity.

== Operational history ==
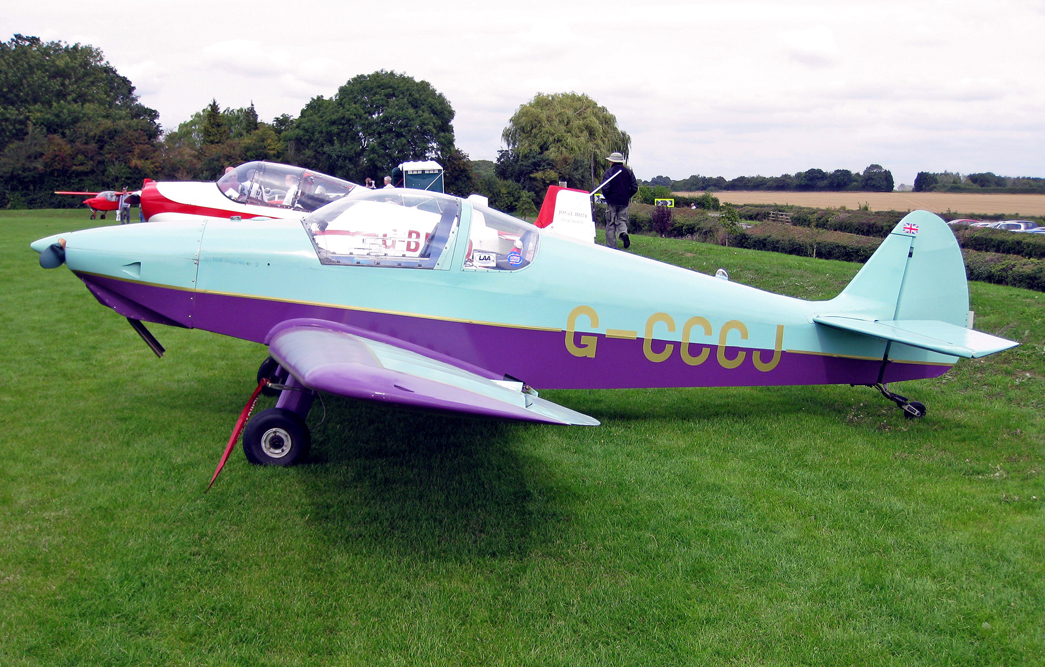
British registered two-seat HN700 Menestrel II

The first prototype HN 433 flew on 25 November 1962 and Menestrel aircraft have continued to be homebuilt from plans since then. Four more HD 433s have appeared on the French register. The more powerful HN 434 proved more popular, with 23 on the French register and 1 on the Finnish.

The two-seat HN 700 has been the most successful of the three variants in numerical terms. 56 have been registered in France and at least one in Spain. In the UK, 8 examples have had Permits to Fly. Others remain under construction. The only HN 701 to appear on the French register, F-PLMT, has a tricycle undercarriage.

A Centre d'essais en vol evaluation of the HN 434 declared it to be the best handling sportplane in Europe.

== Variants ==
HN 433 Menestrel
Single seat. Volkswagen engines, particularly Rectimo-VWs, in the range 22-37 kW (30-50 hp) range. Span 7.00 m (23 ft 0 in).
HN 434 Super Menestrel
Single seat with enlarged cockpit and increased tankage. Powered, typically, by a Volkswagen 1.6 L in the 26-49 kW (35-65 hp) range.
HN 435RL Ménestrel
One-off HN434 modified by builder Roland Lamglais
HN 700 Menestrel II
Side-by-side configuration two-seat version with span increased to 7.80 m (25 ft 7 in). Powered by a 60 kW (80 hp) Limbach L2000 (2.0 L) flat four engine with water-cooled piston heads.
HN 701 Menestrel II
As HD 700 but with 65 kW (87 hp) Limbach 2400 (2.4 L) flat four engine with water-cooled piston heads.

== Specifications (Menestrel II) ==
Data from Jane's All the World's Aircraft 1992-93

General characteristics

- Capacity: 2
- Length: 5.30 m (17 ft 5 in)
- Wingspan: 7.80 m (25 ft 7 in)
- Height: 1.47 m (4 ft 10 in)
- Wing area: 9.80 m^{2} (105.5 sq ft)
- Empty weight: 282 kg (622 lb)
- Max takeoff weight: 500 kg (1,102 lb)
- Powerplant: 1 × Limbach L2000 4-cylinder horizontally opposed, with water-cooled piston heads, 60 kW (80 hp)

Performance

- Cruise speed: 187 km/h (116 mph, 101 kn) maximum
- Range: 1,000 km (620 mi, 540 nmi) with 83 km reserves
- Rate of climb: 6.5 m/s (1,280 ft/min) from sea level with two occupants
