= Nozawa X-1 =

General information
- Type: Two seat sport and training aircraft
- National origin: Japan
- Manufacturer: Nozawa Aviation Research Institute
- Designer: Saburo Tsuchihashi
- Number built: 1

History
- First flight: December 1941

The Nozawa X-1 was intended as a Japanese competitor in the early 1940s two seat civil aircraft market but only one had been built before the Pacific War ended civil activities. The prototype was employed as a trainer and glider tug.

== Design and development ==
The Nozawa Aviation Research Institute was founded in 1939. Their first aircraft, the Nozawa Z-1, was just a copy of the two seat Taylorcraft J-2 Cub but their second, the two seat Nozawa X-1, was original and incorporated advanced features. Its first flight, piloted by Suetomi Kumano, was made in December 1941.

It had a low, cantilever, inverted gull wing with a wooden structure covered with a mixture of plywood and fabric. One advantage of the inverted gull form was that fixed landing legs, placed at the lowest points of the wing, were short. The legs of the X-1 were faired single struts with wheels under large fairings. The tailwheel was not faired.

The X-1's rounded fuselage was also wooden, with a semi-monocoque structure. The Pobjoy R radial engine came with its own cowling and the fuselage nose blended smoothly into it. There were two cockpits in tandem under a long, multipane transparency, starting ahead of the wing leading edge and ending near the trailing edge.

== Operational history ==
In 1941 the X-1 was intended to be competitive with other two-seaters worldwide and there were plans for variants with other engines, but these ambitions ended whenr Japan attacked the United States base in Pearl Harbor. No more were built, though the prototype remained active as a trainer and glider tug at the Furukawa Centre.

== Specifications ==
Data from Japanese Aircraft 1910-1941

General characteristics

- Crew: 2
- Length: 7.14 m (23 ft 5 in)
- Wingspan: 10.60 m (34 ft 9 in)
- Height: 2.16 m (7 ft 1 in) tail down
- Wing area: 15 m^{2} (160 sq ft)
- Airfoil: NACA 4418
- Empty weight: 412 kg (908 lb)
- Gross weight: 632 kg (1,393 lb)
- Powerplant: 1 × Pobjoy R 7-cylinder geared air-cooled radial piston engine, 56 kW (75 hp)
- Propellers: 2-bladed wooden fixed-pitch propeller

Performance

- Maximum speed: 190 km/h (120 mph, 100 kn)
- Cruise speed: 170 km/h (100 mph, 90 kn)
- Landing speed: 65 km/h (40 mph; 35 kn)
- Range: 700 km (435 mi, 378 nmi)
- Wing loading: 42 kg/m^{2} (8.6 lb/sq ft)
- Power/mass: 0.089 kW/kg (0.054 hp/lb)
