= Nervures =

French aircraft manufacturer

- Company type: Privately held company
- Industry: Aerospace
- Founded: 1 September 1993
- Headquarters: Soulom, France
- Key people: Designer: Xavier Demoury
- Products: Paragliders, Paramotor wings
- Website: www.nervures.com

Nervures (English: Ribs) is a French aircraft manufacturer based in Soulom. The company specializes in the design and manufacture of paragliders and paramotor wings in the form of ready-to-fly aircraft, plus paragliding accessories.

Company paraglider designer Xavier Demoury has also designed gliders for ITV Parapentes and Aerodyne Technologies.

The company has been noted for its large range of gliders offered, especially two-place gliders. At several points in its history the company has offered more than one type of two-place glider, such as in 2003-04 when both the Nervures Stromboli and Nervures Alpamayo were in the line.

The line of intermediate gliders in the mid-2000s also included the Altea and Estive as well as the Valluna and the mountain descent Kenya. The Valluna became one of the first gliders by any manufacturer to be certified to the CEN standard.

== Aircraft ==
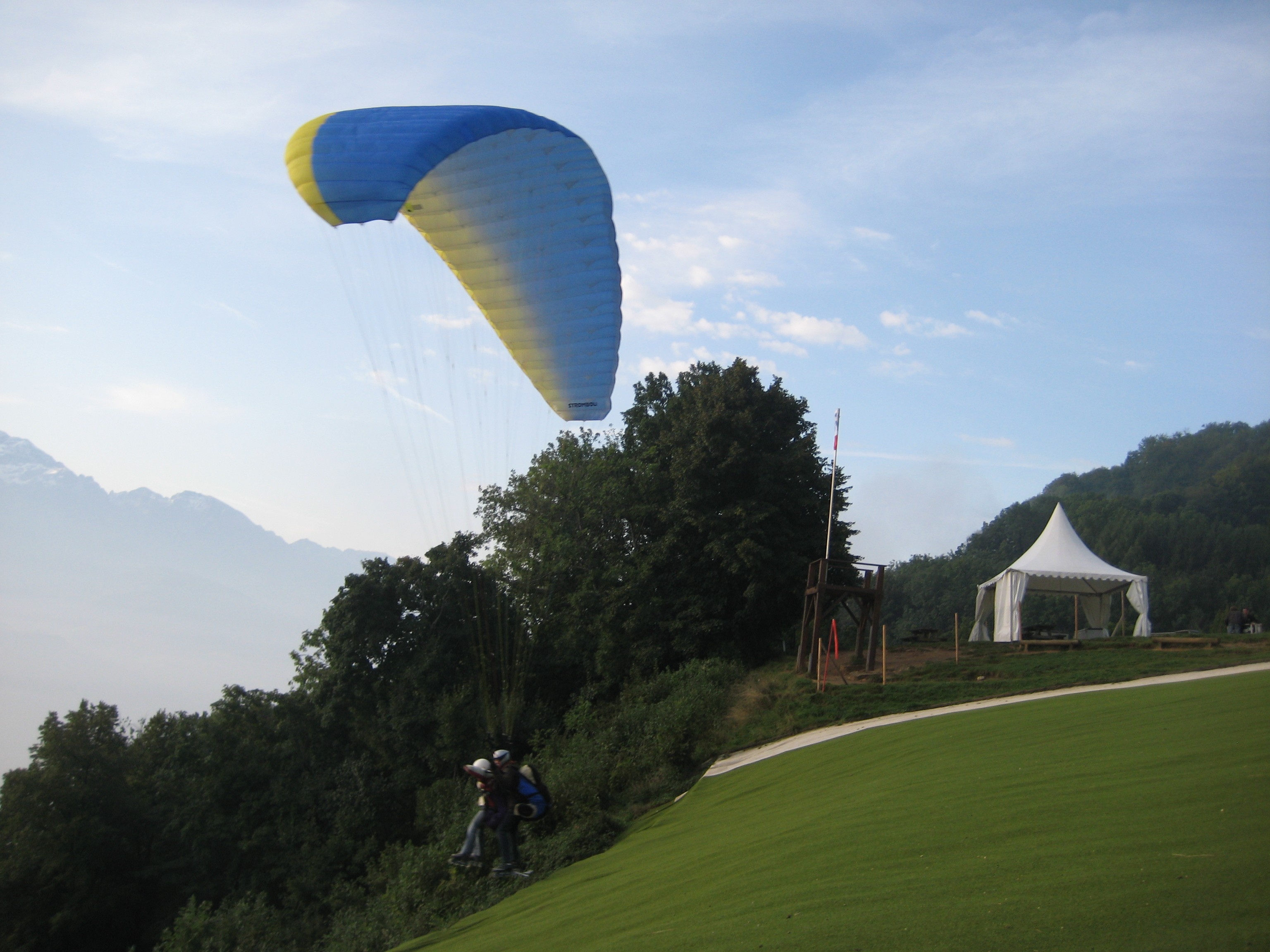
Nervures Stromboli two-place paraglider

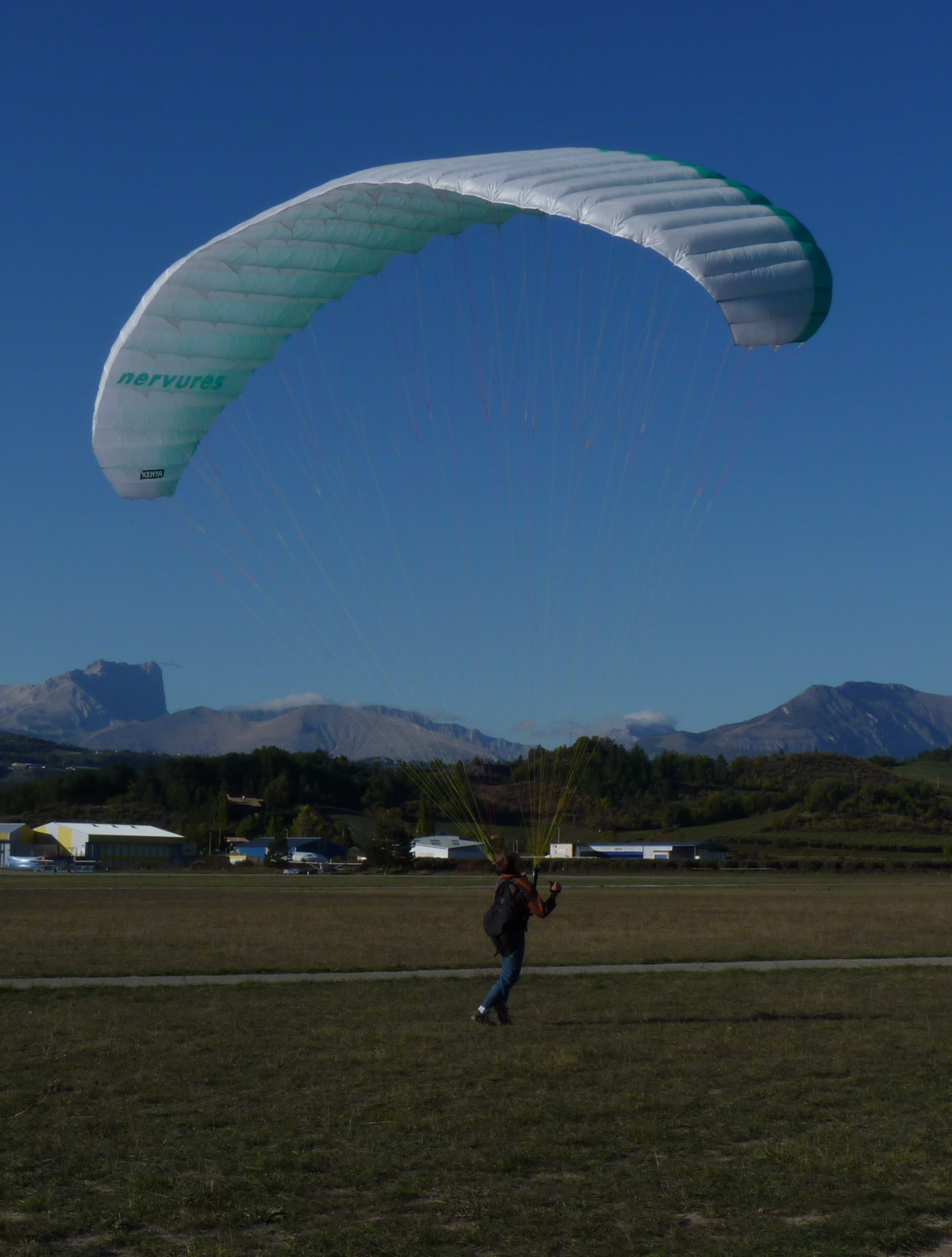
Nervures Kenya mountain descent paraglider

Summary of aircraft built by Nervures:

- Nervures Aloha
- Nervures Alpamayo
- Nervures Altea
- Nervures Arteson
- Nervures Diamir
- Nervures Estive
- Nervures Etna
- Nervures Erebus
- Nervures Espade
- Nervures Everglades
- Nervures Faial
- Nervures Huapi
- Nervures Kailash
- Nervures Kenya
- Nervures Lhotse
- Nervures LOL
- Nervures Morea
- Nervures Spantik
- Nervures Stromboli
- Nervures Swoop
- Nervures Toubkal
- Nervures Valluna
- Nervures Whizz
