= NIAI SKh-1 =

Transport aircraft

SKh-1

General information
- Type: Transport/Utility
- National origin: USSR
- Manufacturer: NIAI (Naoochno-Issledovatel'skiy Aero-Institoot - scientific test aero-institute)
- Designer: Anatolii Georgievich Bedunkovich
- Number built: 1

History
- First flight: 1937

The Skh-1 (SyelskolKhozyaistyennyi - agricultural), (a.k.a. LIG-10 (Leningradskii Institoot Grazdahnskovo Vozdooshnovo Flota- Leningrad Institute civil air fleet)), was a transport/utility aircraft designed and built in the USSR from 1936.

== Development ==
In 1930 the LIIPS ( - Leningrad institute for sail and communications engineers) formed a UK GVF ( - training centre for civil air fleet), in turn the UK GVF formed the NIAI (Naoochno-Issledovatel'skiy Aero-Institoot - scientific test aero-institute) which became the focus of several good design engineers who were given command of individual OKB (Osboye Konstrooktorskoye Byuro – personal design/construction bureau).

The SKh-1 utility transport was designed by Anatolii Georgievich Bedunkovich as a multi-purpose utility transport biplane of mixed construction with wooden folding wings, fitted with slotted ailerons and flaps on all four trailing edges, a welded mild steel tubing fuselage and wooden tail-section with fabric covering. A fixed wide track tail-wheel undercarriage ensured stability when manoeuvring on the ground and for take-off and landing. The cabin accommodated eight, as a passenger transport, or four stretchers plus attendants in casevac (casualty evacuation), 690 kg of cargo or 600 kg of agricultural chemical powder with a ventral spreader. Flight testing was begun in 1937 and continued throughout the Finnish war from 1939-1940 in seed sowing, casevac and other roles. Production was authorised early in 1941 but the GAZ chosen to produce the Skh-1 was evacuated after the German invasion of 1941 (Operation Barbarossa). Although regarded by some as the ancestor of the An-2 the SKh-1/LIG-10 was not directly related to the later aircraft despite the prototype An-2 also carrying the SKh-1 designation.

== Specifications ( SKh-1) ==
Data from Gunston, Bill. "Encyclopaedia of Russian Aircraft 1875-1995". London:Osprey. 1995. ISBN 1-85532-405-9

General characteristics

- Crew: 1/2
- Capacity: 7/8
- Length: 10.7 m (35 ft 1.25 in)
- Wingspan: 12.8 m (42 ft 0 in)
- Wing area: 41.17 m^{2} (443 sq ft)
- Empty weight: 1,215 kg (2,679 lb)
- Gross weight: 2,150 kg (4,740 lb)
- Powerplant: 1 × MG-31F , 246.1 kW (330 hp)

Performance

- Maximum speed: 182 km/h (113 mph, 98 kn)
- Range: 420 km (261 mi, 227 nmi)
- Service ceiling: 3,800 m (12,500 ft)
- Rate of climb: 2.98 m/s (586 ft/min)

== See also ==
- List of aircraft
