= NIAI LEM-3 =

LEM-3

General information
- Type: Transport
- National origin: USSR
- Manufacturer: NIAI (Naoochno-Issledovatel'skiy Aero-Institoot - scientific test aero-institute)
- Designer: Yuri Vladimirovich Domrachayev & Leonid Sergeyevich Vild'grub
- Number built: 1

History
- First flight: early 1934

The LEM-3, (a.k.a. LIG-6 (Leningradskii Institoot Grazdahnskovo Vozdooshnovo Flota- Leningrad Institute civil air fleet)), was a transport aircraft designed and built in the USSR from 1936.

== Development ==
In 1930 the LIIPS ( - Leningrad institute for sail and communications engineers) formed a UK GVF ( - training centre for civil air fleet), in turn the UK GVF formed the NIAI (Naoochno-Issledovatel'skiy Aero-Institoot - scientific test aero-institute) which became the focus of several good design engineers who were given command of individual OKB (Osboye Konstrooktorskoye Byuro – personal design/construction bureau).

The LEM-3 was designed by Yuri Vladimirovich Domrachayev & Leonid Sergeyevich Vild'grub as a very high efficiency transport akin to a motor-glider, with high aspect ratio wings and a low-powered engine. The all wood LEM-3 had a conventional tricycle undercarriage, long span wings were supported by a truss running from approx 1/3 span to the bottom of the u/c legs to the other wing. The initial version had a side-by-side open cockpit, for the two pilots, and an eight-seat cabin with four bench sets under hinged roof access panels with small windows as well as four cargo compartments in the enlarged wing roots. The engine drove a U-2 Propeller, with which the flight tests began in 1936. The factory testing was completed by early 1937 when the aircraft was flown to Moscow for testing at the NII GVF(Naoochno-Issledovatel'skiy Institoot Grazdahnskovo Vozdooshnovo Flota - scientific test institute for civil air fleet), unfortunately the aircraft suffered a forced landing on arrival at the NII GVF airfield and further work was abandoned. A modified version with a large enclosed cabin, trousered main undercarriage, anti nose-over skid and Townend ring cowling, was mooted in a contemporary drawing, but there is no evidence that this version was built, modified, or flown.

== Specifications (LEM-3) ==
Data from Gunston, Bill. "Encyclopaedia of Russian Aircraft 1875-1995". London:Osprey. 1995. ISBN 1-85532-405-9

General characteristics

- Crew: 2
- Capacity: 8
- Length: 13.3 m (43 ft 7.67 in)
- Wingspan: 26 m (85 ft 3.67 in)
- Wing area: 57 m^{2} (613 sq ft)
- Empty weight: 1,050 kg (2,315 lb)
- Gross weight: 2,240 kg (4,938 lb)
- Powerplant: 1 × MG-11 , 74.6 kW (100 hp)

Performance

- Maximum speed: 122 km/h (76 mph, 66 kn)
- Cruise speed: 100 km/h (62 mph, 54 kn)
- Range: 800 km (497 mi, 432 nmi)
- Service ceiling: 2,200 m (7,218 ft)

== See also ==
- List of aircraft
