= Nikitin MU-4 =

MU-4

General information
- Type: Amphibian trainer aircraft
- National origin: USSR
- Designer: Vasilii Vasilyevich Nikitin & N.G. Mikhelson
- Number built: 1

History
- First flight: 1936

The Nikitin MU-4 was an amphibian trainer aircraft produced in the USSR in 1936.

== Development ==
The flying boat style MU-4 training amphibian was a single-engined side-by-side two-seat biplane. The single engine was supported in front of the upper mainplane by a short nacelle and the cabane struts of the wing. The upper wing was supported on dural interplane and cabane struts which were braced with flying and landing wires. Built predominantly of wood the wings and strut braced tail surfaces were part plywood and part fabric covered, whilst the fuselage was built up from wooden frames and plywood skinning. The manually retractable Ski/wheel undercarriage was attached either side of the fuselage forward of the wings. Flight testing was carried out successfully, demonstrating good flying qualities and adequate performance, however after prolonged testing the aircraft crashed due to a glue failure

== Specifications (MU-4) ==
Data from Gunston, Bill. "Encyclopedia of Russian Aircraft 1875-1995". London:Osprey. 1995. ISBN 1-85532-405-9

General characteristics

- Crew: 2
- Wingspan: 12 m (39 ft 4.5 in)
- Wing area: 33 m^{2} (355 sq ft)
- Empty weight: 900 kg (1,984 lb)
- Gross weight: 1,200 kg (2,646 lb)
- Powerplant: 1 × MG-11F , 134.23 kW (180 hp)

Performance

- Maximum speed: 168 km/h (104 mph, 90 kn)

== See also ==
Aircraft of comparable role, configuration, and era

- F.B.A. 271
- Lioré et Olivier LeO H-221

Related lists

- List of aircraft
