= NAGL System NAGL =

Austrian hang glider

NAGL

General information
- Type: Powered hang glider
- National origin: Austria
- Manufacturer: NAGL System
- Status: Production completed

The NAGL System NAGL is an Austrian powered hang glider that was designed and produced by NAGL System of Weißkirchen in Steiermark. Now out of production, when it was available the aircraft was supplied complete and ready-to-fly.

== Design and development ==
The aircraft features a cable-braced hang glider-style high-wing, weight-shift controls, single-place accommodation, foot-launching and landing and a single engine in tractor configuration.

The aircraft uses a standard hang glider wing, made from bolted-together aluminum tubing, with its single surface wing covered in Dacron sailcloth. The wing is supported by a single tube-type kingpost and uses an "A" frame control bar. The engine is a two-stroke, single cylinder NAGL. The engine is mounted beneath the glider's keel tube, with the exhaust system facing forward and driving a large 2.0 m (6.6 ft) propeller via an extension shaft. The large diameter propeller makes for quiet operations, including on takeoff. The fuel tank capacity is 5 litres (1.1 imp gal; 1.3 US gal), with 9 litres (2.0 imp gal; 2.4 US gal) optional.

The preferred launch and landing position is prone, with the pilot relying on wheels on the control bar and a short trolley with wheels supporting the pilot's feet and pod. Foot launching is also possible.

In reviewing the aircraft, Rene Coulon noted that the NAGL is "a very original design".

== Specifications (NAGL) ==
Data from Bertrand

General characteristics

- Crew: one
- Empty weight: 21 kg (46 lb) power pack only
- Fuel capacity: 5 litres (1.1 imp gal; 1.3 US gal), with 9 litres (2.0 imp gal; 2.4 US gal) optional
- Powerplant: 1 × NAGL single cylinder, air-cooled aircraft engine
- Propellers: 2-bladed, 2.0 m (6 ft 7 in) diameter
