= Nieuport-Delage NiD 48 =

French fighter aircraft

NiD 48
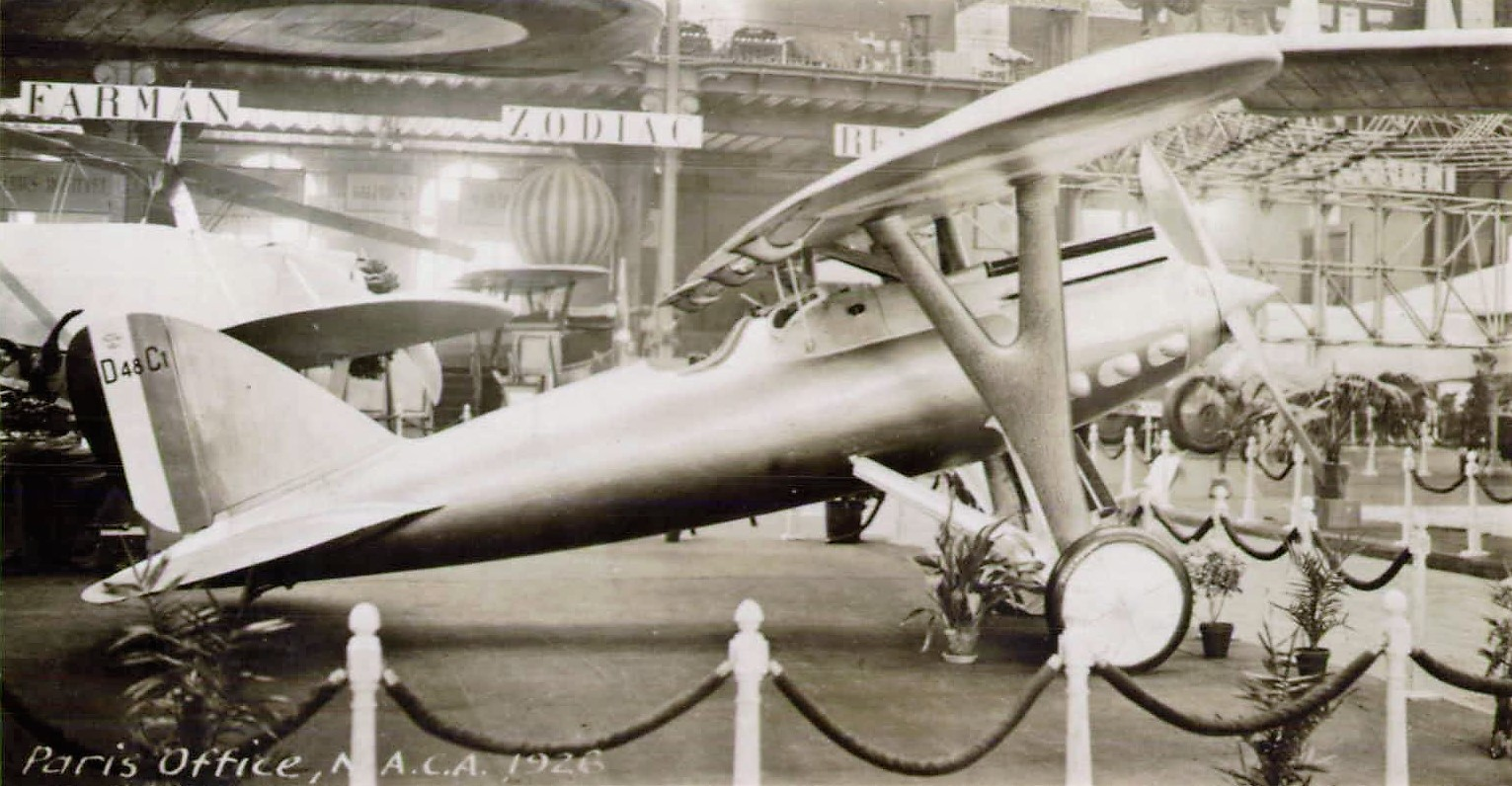

General information
- Type: Fighter aircraft
- National origin: France
- Manufacturer: Nieuport-Delage
- Number built: 3 (the first unflown, built for static load tests)

History
- First flight: First quarter 1927

The Nieuport-Delage NiD 48 was a single-engine parasol wing light fighter aircraft designed and produced by the French aircraft manufacturer Nieuport-Delage.

It was designed for a French 1926 light fighter competition. Unlike many Nieuport designs of the period, the NiD 48 was not a sesquiplane but a monoplane, its wing mounted like those of the sesquiplanes over the fuselage in parasol wing configuration. It bore a resemblance to the NiD 42, except it lacked an ancillary wing, had smaller dimensions and was only half of the loaded weight. Both of the flightworthy NiD 48s built were powered by Hispano-Suiza upright V-12 water-cooled engines, with a 298 kW (400 hp) 12Jb in the first prototype and a 373 kW (500 hp) 12Hb in the second, the NiD 48bis. Aft of the engine, the fuselage had a circular cross-section that tapered into the tail unit. It had a single-seat open cockpit that was located underneath the trailing edge of the wing.

Performing its maiden flight during early 1929, a total of three airframes were completed, two of which were airworthy. During official trials, the aircraft’s performance was not markedly better than that of the much heavier Nieuport-Delage NiD 62, except for its climb rate. As the NiD 62 was already closer to production, it was decided to discontinue work on the NiD 48. One of the prototypes was subsequently used for training purposes for a time before being retired during the 1930s.

== Design and development ==
The NiD 48 was intended to be a lightweight single-seat pursuit aircraft. The fuselage, which had a circular cross section and a maximum diameter of one meter (3.28 ft.), comprised a fabric-covered shell that was produced via the cold gluing of strips of white wood. It was assembled from two longitudinal sections that were molded along with the longerons, which extended from one end to the other and had a trapezoidal cross section. A combination of metal bulkheads and the longerons was used to assure the rigidity of the whole fuselage.

Prior to the joining of the two sections of the fuselage, the engine bed was installed. This consisted of both vertical and horizontal beams that, along with the main bulkheads at the points of attachment of the wings and landing gear, formed a rigid framework of duralumin that was bolted to the shell. The vertical beams were prolonged towards the rear of the pilot's cockpit and functioned as the attachment point for both the pilot's seat and control elements. Both the elevator and ailerons were operated using the same control stick. The elevator and rudder were actuated using cables while actuation of the ailerons used a combination of tubes and rigid rods; this arrangement enabled the use of either aileron if one was to sustain damage or otherwise be rendered unusable.

The NiD 48 was furnished with a straight-edged constant chord parasol wing that was furnished with blunt tips, full span ailerons with a slightly curved trailing edges and a compact cutout above the cockpit to permit greater visibility for the pilot. Akin to the NiD 42, on either side of the fuselage was a single streamlined adjustable strut that was attached to the undercarriage and assured the rigidity of the whole cell. Each strut consisted of a pair of duralumin halves, the form of a Y whose two upper branches were attached to the two wing spars and were joined using brackets. The wing was attached to a triangular cabane, comprising a pair of transverse inverted V-section members, that rose from the fuselage in front of the cockpit and were directly secured to the main bulkheads.

The shape of the wing section was maintained by plywood ribs that were attached to the spars. These spars, which were composed of duralumin, were formed of a mixture of webs and flanges that varied in number across the wing in accordance with the applicable stresses to be imposed upon that specific area. Both transverse and longitudinal spruce strips transferred stresses to the ribs and, in turn, to the spars. The wings were internally braced using both duralumin tubes and piano wires. The leading edge, which was made of spruce, was reinforced both from above and below, by its plywood covering. A compact piano wire formed the wing’s trailing edge.

The cantilever tailplane was mounted at mid-fuselage height. The horizontal empennage was elliptical in shape and was supported by a box girder spar that bolted to the rear bulkhead and passed through the centre of gravity. The cross-sectional shape of the stabilizer was maintained by longitudinal and transverse plywood ribs; a plywood covering was also fitted from as far as the rear spar; this spare also serves at the hinging point for the single unbalanced elevators of similar construction. The vertical fin, which was demountable and held by the rudder post, was largely composed of plywood. It had a round-edged rudder, which was also unbalanced, that ended above the fuselage; the horns for both the elevator and rudder were concealed by a streamlined housing on the rear of the fuselage.

The NiD 48 was furnished with a fixed conventional undercarriage. The mainwheels were fitted on a faired axle that was supported by a pair of rearward leaning V-shaped struts; these consisted of a pair of stamped parts that were riveted together at their edges. The fairing of the landing gear axle effectively formed a compact lower wing, which led to some figures to refer to the NiD 48 as being a sesquiplane. It formed a hollow duralumin girder, inside of which the two movable semi-axles of steel tubing would oscillate and were hinged at their inner ends to boxes integral with the girders. The main undercarriage worked in conjunction with a tail skid; shock absorbers composed of rubber were also present. These struts also carried the rectangular radiators that cooled the engine.

Power was provided by a single Hispano-Suiza 12Jb V-12 water cooled engine, which was completely concealed within the fuselage. Elements, including the propeller hub and nose of the aircraft, were streamlined by a housing. Fuel was supplied to the engine by a pair of engine-driven pumps from the fuel tanks, which were designed to be cast off during flight to lighten the aircraft. These tanks were located on the upper wing on both sides of the fuselage. The oil tank, whose outer wail formed a radiator, was located in front of the engine.

== Prototypes and flight history ==
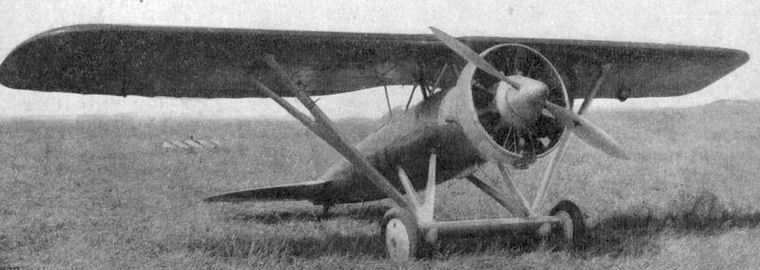
NiD 481 photo from L'Aerophile Salon 1932

The first airframe was completed in October 1926 and used for static load testing. The first prototype commenced its official tests in May 1927 while the NiD 48bis followed four months later. Although lighter than the similarly powered NiD 62, trials conducted in March 1928 showed that the NiD 48bis could only significantly bettered it in the rate of climb. However, since the NiD 62 was already in production, it was decided not to proceed with the NiD 48.

During July 1929, one of the prototypes went to Etampes as a trainer. In the summer of 1930, the NiD 48bis was re-engined with a 179 kW (240 hp), nine cylinder radial Lorraine Algol Junior, as the NiD 481, and used as an aerobatic aircraft, registered F-AJTC; it was withdrawn from use in 1935.

== Specifications (Hispano-Suiza 12Jb engine) ==
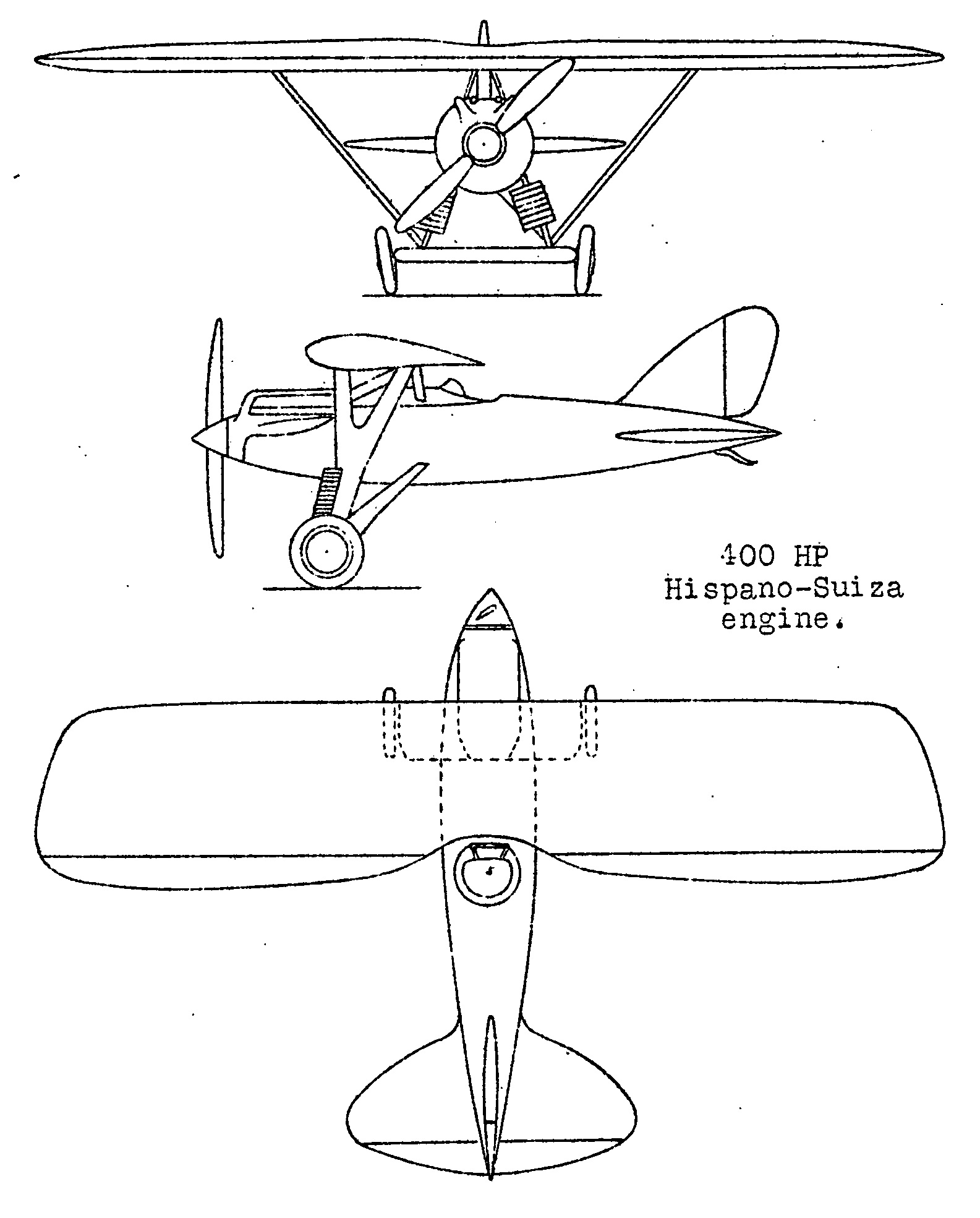
Nieuport-Delage NiD 48 3-view drawing from NACA Aircraft Circular No.29

Data from The Complete Book of Fighters

General characteristics

- Crew: One
- Length: 6.40 m (21 ft 0 in)
- Wingspan: 10.00 m (32 ft 10 in)
- Wing area: 18.38 m^{2} (197.8 sq ft)
- Empty weight: 1,032 kg (2,275 lb)
- Gross weight: 1,290 kg (2,844 lb)
- Powerplant: 1 × Hispano-Suiza 12Jb upright V-12 water cooled, 300 kW (400 hp)
- Propellers: 2-bladed

Performance

- Maximum speed: 276 km/h (171 mph, 149 kn) at sea level
- Endurance: 1.3 hours
- Time to altitude: 16.26 min to 5,000 m (16,405 ft)

Armament

- 2 × 7.7 mm (0.303 in) synchronised machine guns firing through propeller.
