= NAS Air King =

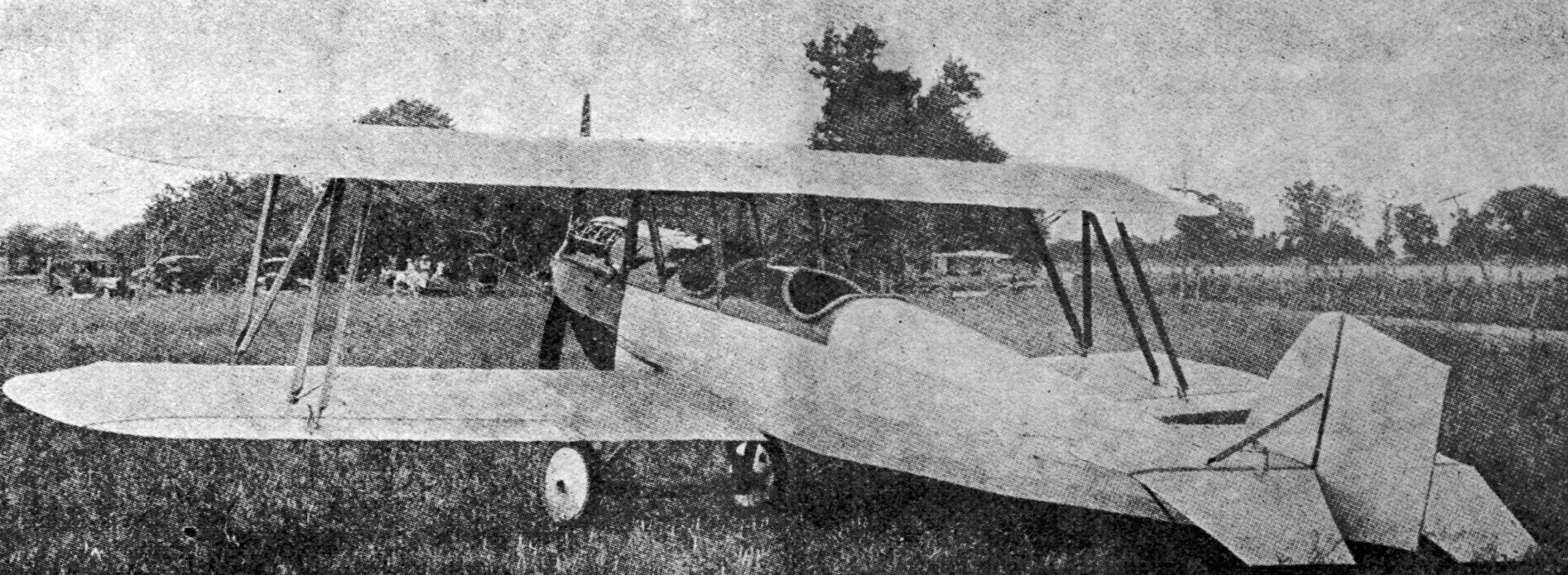
- NAS Air King Model 26

General information
- Type: Civil light transport
- National origin: United States
- Manufacturer: National Airways System, Lomax, IL
- Number built: 23

History
- First flight: 1926-7

The NAS (National Airways System) Air King was a US light biplane transport aircraft designed in 1926 to carry three passengers in two open cockpits. Only one was built but in 1928 it was revised to carry two passengers and was more successful, with over twenty produced.

== Design and development ==
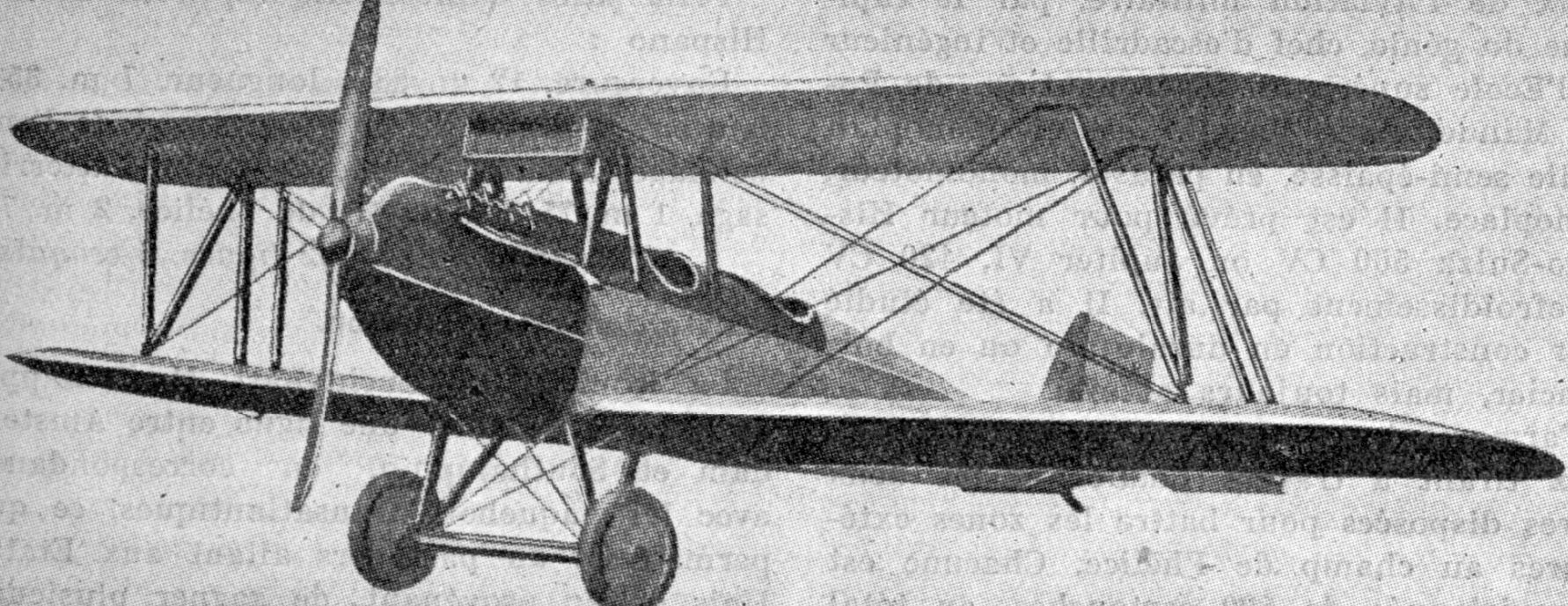
NAS Air King Model 26

The Air King Model 26 was a single bay biplane with wings of rectangular plan, though with rounded, steel tube tips. The rest of the wing structure was a mixture of spruce and ash, with all wing surfaces fabric-covered. Because its upper and lower wings were interchangeable, the span of the upper one was only about 90% that of the lower, the latter mounted on the lower fuselage. They were braced together by inward-leaning, N-form interplane struts with 14 in (360 mm) of stagger and supported over the fuselage on short, outward-leaning cabane struts, an inverted V forwards and a single strut aft on each side. Only the lower wing was set with dihedral (2.5°). Ailerons on upper and lower wings were externally interconnected though, unusually, port and starboard pairs could be separately controlled.

The fuselage was a fabric-covered, trussed steel tube structure with the readily available Curtiss OX-5 water-cooled V-8 under a rather pointed cowling in the nose. Its honeycomb radiator was mounted under the upper wing. There were two wide, open cockpits, each with a bench seat for two. The tail surfaces were very angular and constructed from dural, with a tailplane externally braced to the fin and fuselage. Its control surfaces were broad chord; the elevators had a deep cut-out for rudder movement.

The Air King's fixed undercarriage was conventional for its time, its wheels on a single axle mounted on short, vertical legs with trailing drag struts attached to the lower fuselage and a rear tailskid.

The date of the Air King's first flight in uncertain but it had been completed by January 1927. No more four-seaters were built but in early 1928 the prototype reappeared as the Model 28 with a smaller rear cockpit seating only the pilot. The engine cowling was cleaned up, totally enclosing the OX-5, and the cabane struts revised with a forward single strut and a transverse V aft on each side. It had a wider track, split axle undercarriage with longer main legs from mid-fuselage. The vertical tail was also modified, with the external bracing removed and a rounded fin and rudder. It was 7 in (180 mm) shorter but its other dimensions were unchanged, as, largely, was the performance. Slightly cheaper, this two passenger version proved more popular and twenty-three were completed.

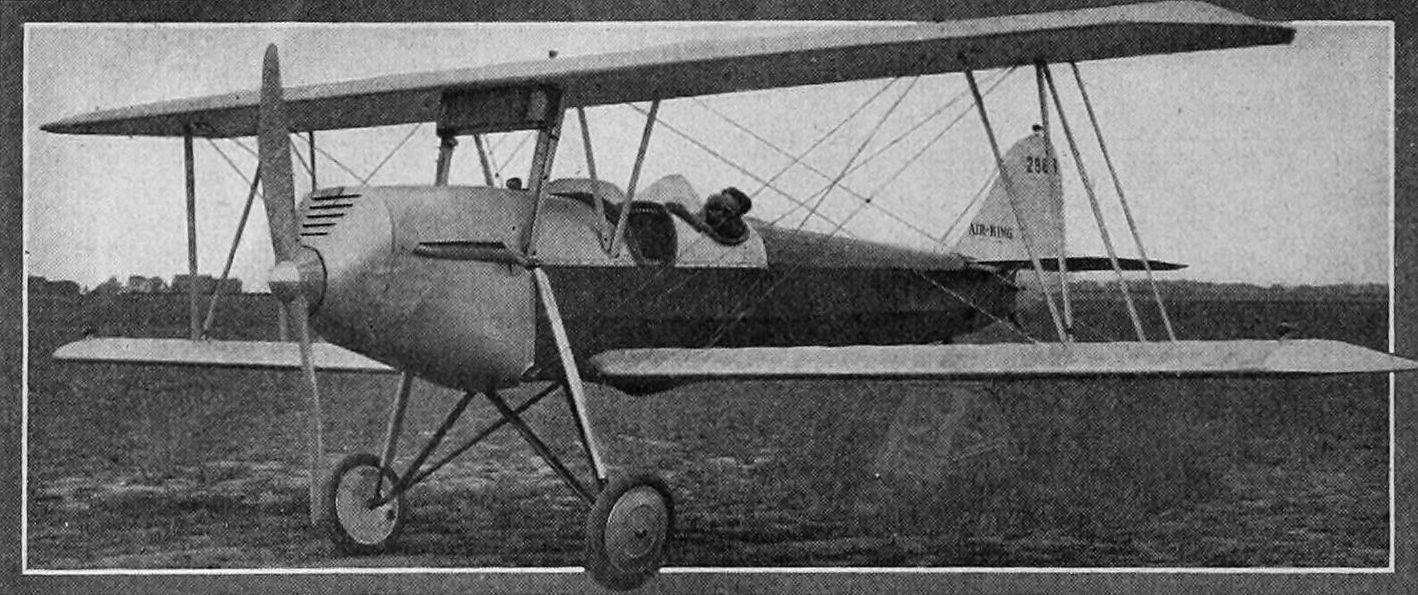
NAS Air King Model 28

== Variants ==
Model 26
1926 first prototype, three passengers.
Model 28
1928 two passenger version with cleaned-up engine cowling and new, two axle wider track undercarriage. 23 built.

== Specifications (Air King Model 26) ==
Data from Aero Digest (1927)

General characteristics

- Crew: one
- Capacity: three passengers
- Length: 26 ft (7.9 m)
- Upper wingspan: 30 ft 11 in (9.42 m)
- Lower wingspan: 33 ft (10 m) ; another source has 34 ft 1 in (10.39 m)
- Height: 8 ft 8 in (2.64 m)
- Empty weight: 1,095 lb (497 kg)
- Fuel capacity: 35 US gal (29 imp gal; 130 L)
- Useful load: 850 lb (390 kg)
- Powerplant: 1 × Curtiss OX-5 water-cooled V-8, 90 hp (67 kW)
- Propellers: 2-bladed Hartzell Propeller

Performance

- Maximum speed: 99 mph (159 km/h, 86 kn)
- Cruise speed: 85 mph (137 km/h, 74 kn)
- Range: 400 mi (640 km, 350 nmi)
- Service ceiling: 17,000 ft (5,200 m)
- Rate of climb: 550 ft/min (2.8 m/s)
- Landing speed: 31 mph (50 km/h; 27 kn)
