= New PowerChutes =

South African aircraft manufacturer

New PowerChutes (Pty) Ltd
- Company type: Proprietary company
- Industry: Aerospace
- Founded: 2001
- Defunct: 2006
- Fate: Out of business
- Headquarters: Alberton, Gauteng (Ekurhuleni Metropolitan Municipality), South Africa
- Key people: Managing Director: Tim Stiff
- Products: Powered parachutes

New PowerChutes (Pty) Ltd (also called New Powerchutes) was a South African aircraft manufacturer based in Alberton, Gauteng. The company specialized in the design and manufacture of powered parachutes in the form of ready-to-fly aircraft.

The company seems to have been founded about 2001 and gone out of business in 2006. The Managing Director was Tim Stiff. The company was a proprietary company under South African law.

The company produced the New PowerChutes Gemini, a two-seat powered parachute design.

== Aircraft ==
Summary of aircraft built by New PowerChutes
Model name	First flight	Number built	Type
New PowerChutes Gemini	2001		two-seat powered parachute
