= New Era Model A =

1930s American civil aircraft

Model A
- Side view of the New Era Model A

General information
- Type: Civil aircraft
- National origin: American
- Manufacturer: New Era Aircraft Corp.
- Number built: 1
- Registration: X10778

History
- First flight: 1931
- Last flight: 1932
- Fate: Destroyed

The New Era Model A was a two-seater pusher monoplane, dating from the early 1930s.

== Design and development ==
The New Era Aircraft Corporation was founded in 1929 by brothers Don and Forest Fogle of Butler, Pennsylvania. They built two aircraft, the first of which was the Model A.

The aircraft featured a small fully enclosed pod fuselage and had a twin boom layout. The monoplane wing had a tapered planform with rounded wingtips. The wing's trailing edge had a recessed cutout at the rear of the fuselage, in order to accommodate the pusher propeller. Struts from the fixed undercarriage braced the monoplane wing and also the tail-booms. There was a cruciform tail. The aircraft was given the registration X10778, and then NC10778.

== Operational history ==
The Model A first flew in 1931. On April 22, 1932, when the aircraft was taxying over rough terrain, the tailbooms broke. The aircraft was not rebuilt.

== Specifications ==
Data from Boeing News and Aerofiles

General characteristics

- Crew: 1
- Capacity: 2
- Wingspan: 35 ft (11 m)
- Powerplant: 1 × Cirrus four-cylinder, 90 hp (67 kW)
- Propellers: 2-bladed

Performance

- Cruise speed: 130 mph (210 km/h, 110 kn)
