= Nihon L7P =

Japanese transport seaplane prototype

L7P

General information
- Type: Military transport seaplane
- Manufacturer: Nihon Hikoki KK (Nippi)
- Primary user: Imperial Japanese Navy Air Service
- Number built: 1 (+1 uncompleted airframe)

History
- First flight: 1942

The Nihon L7P was a Japanese military seaplane built during World War II in the early 1940s.

== Design ==
Initially, the project, called the Experimental 13-shi Small Transport, was designed with an all-metal airframe, but this was abandoned, restarting manufacture of the fuselage from metal and the wings from wood. The wing position was also raised to above the fuselage. The L7P was powered by two 680 hp (510 kW) Nakajima Kotobuki 41 radial engines.

== Development ==
In 1938, the command of the Imperial Japanese Navy Air Service (IJNAS) issued specifications for a 13-shi Small Transport. The team of designers at Nihon Hikoki Kabushiki Kaisha (Nippi) under the leadership of Asahi Tsunashima designed the aircraft using the hull of the Fairchild XA-942B, which had been purchased in 1936 and used by the IJNAS as the LXF1.

Due to the workload of the company working on the design of the Nippi K8Nil (12-shi Experimental Training Seaplane), work on the L7P progressed slowly, but the first prototype was ready in February 1942. The tests that took place at the 1st Maritime Aviation Arsenal in Kamisaguri were unsuccessful, revealing the poor characteristics of the aircraft. The IJNAS rejected the L7P, as the requirements for this type of aircraft changed. The second prototype of the aircraft remained unfinished and was dismantled for scrap.

== Specifications ==
Data from

General characteristics

- Crew: 3
- Capacity: 8 passengers
- Length: 14 m (45 ft 11 in)
- Wingspan: 19.6 m (64 ft 4 in)
- Height: 4.7 m (15 ft 5 in)
- Wing area: 50.10 m^{2} (539.3 sq ft)
- Empty weight: 3,705 kg (8,168 lb)
- Gross weight: 5,899 kg (13,005 lb)
- Powerplant: 2 × Nakajima Kotobuki air-cooled radial piston engines, 510 kW (680 hp) each normal; 530 kW (710 hp) for take-off
- Propellers: 3-bladed constant-speed propellers

Performance

- Maximum speed: 332 km/h (206 mph, 179 kn) at sea level
- Cruise speed: 278 km/h (173 mph, 150 kn)
- Alighting speed: 111 km/h (69 mph; 60 kn)
- Range: 1,600 km (990 mi, 860 nmi)
- Endurance: 6 hours at 278 km/h (173 mph; 150 kn)
- Service ceiling: 7,100 m (23,300 ft)
- Rate of climb: 6 m/s (1,200 ft/min)
- Time to altitude: 3,000 m (9,800 ft) in 6 minutes 51 seconds
- Wing loading: 117.7 kg/m^{2} (24.1 lb/sq ft)
- Power/mass: 6.5 kg/kW (10.7 lb/hp)
