= NIAI LK-4 =

LK-4

General information
- Type: Trainer
- National origin: USSR
- Manufacturer: NIAI (Naoochno-Issledovatel'skiy Aero-Institoot - scientific test aero-institute)
- Designer: Anatolii Georgievich Bedunkovich
- Number built: 1

History
- First flight: early 1934

The LK-4 (Leningradskii Kombinat), (also NIAI-4) was a tandem two-seat trainer aircraft designed and built in the USSR from 1933.

== Development ==
In 1930 the LIIPS (Leningrad institute for sail and communications engineers) formed a UK GVF (training centre for civil air fleet), in turn the UK GVF formed the NIAI (Naoochno-Issledovatel'skiy Aero-Institoot - scientific test aero-institute) which became the focus of several good design engineers who were given command of individual OKB (Osboye Konstrooktorskoye Byuro – personal design/construction bureau).

Designed by Anatolii Georgievich Bedunkovich, an Engineer Colonel, the LK-4 was really four aircraft in one, for use in research projects and for training in aircraft of different configurations. The wooden airframe was covered in plywood on the forward fuselage and leading edges of the wings, the rest being covered in fabric. The LK-4 was simple to make and used the standard propeller and instruments from the U-2 (oochebnyy – trainer). Testing began early in 1934, with a recommendation being given for production of the aircraft, which never materialised, despite the aircraft's success in several light aircraft competitions from 1934 to 1936.

== Variants ==
- LK-4-I – The first variation with slats on the upper wing, twin parallel bracing struts and a cantilever lower wing.
- LK-4-II – The second variation had a plain un-slatted upper wing which was moved aft, and the lower wing was moved forward.
- LK-4-III - The third variation was a parasol monoplane, with the lower wing removed.
- LK-4-IV – The final variation was a low-wing monoplane with the lower wing replaced by the upper wing and twin bracing struts to the top of the fuselage.

== Specifications (LK-4-1) ==
Data from Gunston, Bill. "Encyclopaedia of Russian Aircraft 1875-1995". London:Osprey. 1995. ISBN 1-85532-405-9

General characteristics

- Crew: 2
- Length: 7.07 m (23 ft 2.33 in)
- Wingspan: 9.0 m (29 ft 6.33 in)
- Wing area: 20.2 m^{2} (217 sq ft)
- Empty weight: 565 kg (1,246 lb)
- Gross weight: 790 kg (1,742 lb)
- Powerplant: 1 × M-11 , 74.6 kW (100 hp)

Performance

- Maximum speed: 157 km/h (97.5 mph, 84.7 kn)
- Range: 850 km (528 mi, 459 nmi)
- Service ceiling: 3,300 m (10,826 ft)
- Rate of climb: 2.7777 m/s (5,436.8 ft/min)

== See also ==
Aircraft of comparable role, configuration, and era

- Handley Page HP.39 Gugnunc
- Akaflieg Braunschweig Zaeunkoenig

Related lists

- List of aircraft
