= Nikitin NV-6 =

NV-6

General information
- Type: Aerobatic aircraft
- National origin: USSR
- Manufacturer: Nikitin
- Designer: Vasilii Vasilyevich Nikitin
- Number built: 1

History
- First flight: December 1940; 84 years ago

The Nikitin NV-6, (a.k.a. UTI-6), was a single seat aerobatic biplane designed and produced in the USSR in 1940.

== Development ==
Nikitin designed the NV-6 as an aerobatic aircraft which was unusual in the USSR in 1939. The fuselage of welded KhMA steel tubing, and lower wing were taken from the NV-1 sporting aircraft of 1933. A new wooden upper wing supported by I struts and cabanes, duralumin tail surfaces with fabric covering and cantilever faired undercarriage attached to the fuselage completed the NV-6. Flight testing was begun by Nikitin and Schyevchyenko during December 1940 but the onset of the Great Patriotic War stopped further work.

== Specifications (NV-6) ==
Data from Gunston, Bill. "Encyclopaedia of Russian Aircraft 1875-1995". London:Osprey. 1995. ISBN 1-85532-405-9

General characteristics

- Crew: 1
- Length: 5.8 m (19 ft 0.5 in)
- Wingspan: 7.0 m (22 ft 11.5 in)
- Wing area: 14 m^{2} (151 sq ft)
- Empty weight: 560 kg (1,235 lb)
- Gross weight: 750 kg (1,653 lb)
- Powerplant: 1 × MG-11F , 134.23 kW (180 hp)

Performance

- Maximum speed: 270 km/h (168 mph, 146 kn)
- Endurance: 2.5 hours
- Service ceiling: 4,500 m (14,750 ft)

== See also ==
Aircraft of comparable role, configuration, and era

- Pitts S-1
- Christen Eagle

Related lists list of aircraft
