= Edward Allen =

Edward, Ed or Ted Allen may refer to:

== Arts and entertainment ==
- Edward Alleyn (1566–1626), also written as Edward Allen, Elizabethan actor
- Edward L. Allen (1830–1914), American photographer
- Ed Allen (musician) (1897–1974), jazz musician
- Ed Allen (writer) (born 1948), American short story writer
- Ted Allen (Edward R. Allen, born 1965), writer and television personality
- Ed Allen (TV host) (1926–2018), television exercise instructor of the 1960s and 1970s

== Politics ==
- Edward Allen (Australian politician) (1862–1936), Australian politician and journalist
- Edward Allen (Canadian politician) (c. 1829–1890), farmer and politician in British Columbia
- Edward H. Allen (1830–1895), U.S. politician
- Edward M. Allen (died 1907), American politician and businessman in Maryland
- Edward N. Allen (1891–1972), American politician, lieutenant governor of Connecticut
- Edward P. Allen (1839–1909), politician from the U.S. state of Michigan

== Other people ==
- Edward Patrick Allen (1853–1926), Roman Catholic bishop
- Edward Allen (Medal of Honor) (1859–1917), U.S. Navy sailor in the Boxer Rebellion
- Edward Henry Allen (1908–1942), U.S. Navy lieutenant
- Edward Jay Allen (1830–1915), entrepreneur, pioneer, and civil engineer
- Edward Allen (footballer), English footballer
- Eddie Allen (fullback) (1918–2012), American football fullback and college coach
- Ed Allen (American football) (1901–1979), American football player
- Ned Allen (1875–?), Scottish footballer

== Other uses ==
- USS Edward H. Allen, a John C. Butler-class destroyer escort

== See also ==
- Ed Allan, Australian rules footballer
- Eddie Allen (disambiguation)
- Edmund Allen (disambiguation)
- Edgar Allen (disambiguation)
- Edward Alleyn (disambiguation)
- Edwin G. Allen (1920–2001), New Brunswick politician
- Allen (surname)
