= Eddie Allen =

Eddie Allen may refer to:

- Eddie Allen (fullback) (1918–2012), American football player and coach
- Eddie Allen (American football coach) (born 1980), American football coach and player
- Eddie Allen (folk musician) (born 1952), American folk musician
- Eddie Allen (jazz musician) (born 1957), American jazz trumpeter and flugelhornist
- Ed Allen (musician) (1897–1974), American jazz trumpeter
- Edmund T. Allen (1896–1943), American test pilot

== See also ==
- Edmund Allen (disambiguation)
- Edward Allen (disambiguation)
- Allen (surname)
