= Edmund Allen =

Edmund Allen may refer to:

- Edmund Allen (priest) (c. 1519–1559), English scholar and bishop-elect of Rochester
- Edmund Allen (politician) (1844–1909), New Zealand politician
- Edmund T. Allen (1896–1943), American test pilot

== See also ==
- Eddie Allen (disambiguation)
- Edward Allen (disambiguation)
