= Edmund T. Allen =

American test pilot

Edmund Turney Allen
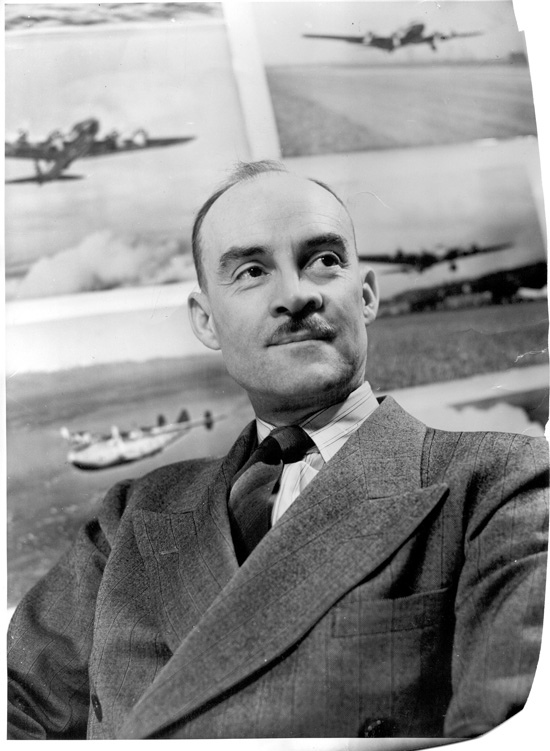
- Born: January 4, 1896; Chicago, Illinois, U.S.
- Died: February 18, 1943 (aged 47); Seattle, Washington, U.S.
- Cause of death: Aircrash
- Education: University of Illinois (two years); Massachusetts Institute of Technology (two years)
- Occupation(s): Aeronautical engineer, test pilot
- Known for: Aircraft flight testing

Edmund Turney Allen (January 4, 1896 – February 18, 1943) was a pioneer of modern flight test who flew for nearly every major American aircraft manufacturer and took some of the most famous planes of all time up for their first flights.

== Early life ==
Allen was born in Chicago, Illinois on 4 January 1896. He had to work for three years after his father died to support his family. He then finished one year at the University of Illinois.

== Career ==
=== World War I ===
When the United States entered World War I, he enlisted in the US Army Signal Corps as a lieutenant. He initially served as an instructor pilot but then was sent to the British flight test center in England to learn flight testing techniques. Before the armistice in November 1918, he returned to the US Army's flight test center at McCook Field, Ohio, to apply his flight experience and overseas observations. After the armistice, he became the first test pilot for the National Advisory Committee on Aeronautics at Langley Field, Virginia. In 1919, he returned to the University of Illinois for a year and then studied aeronautical engineering for two years at the Massachusetts Institute of Technology.

=== Between the wars ===
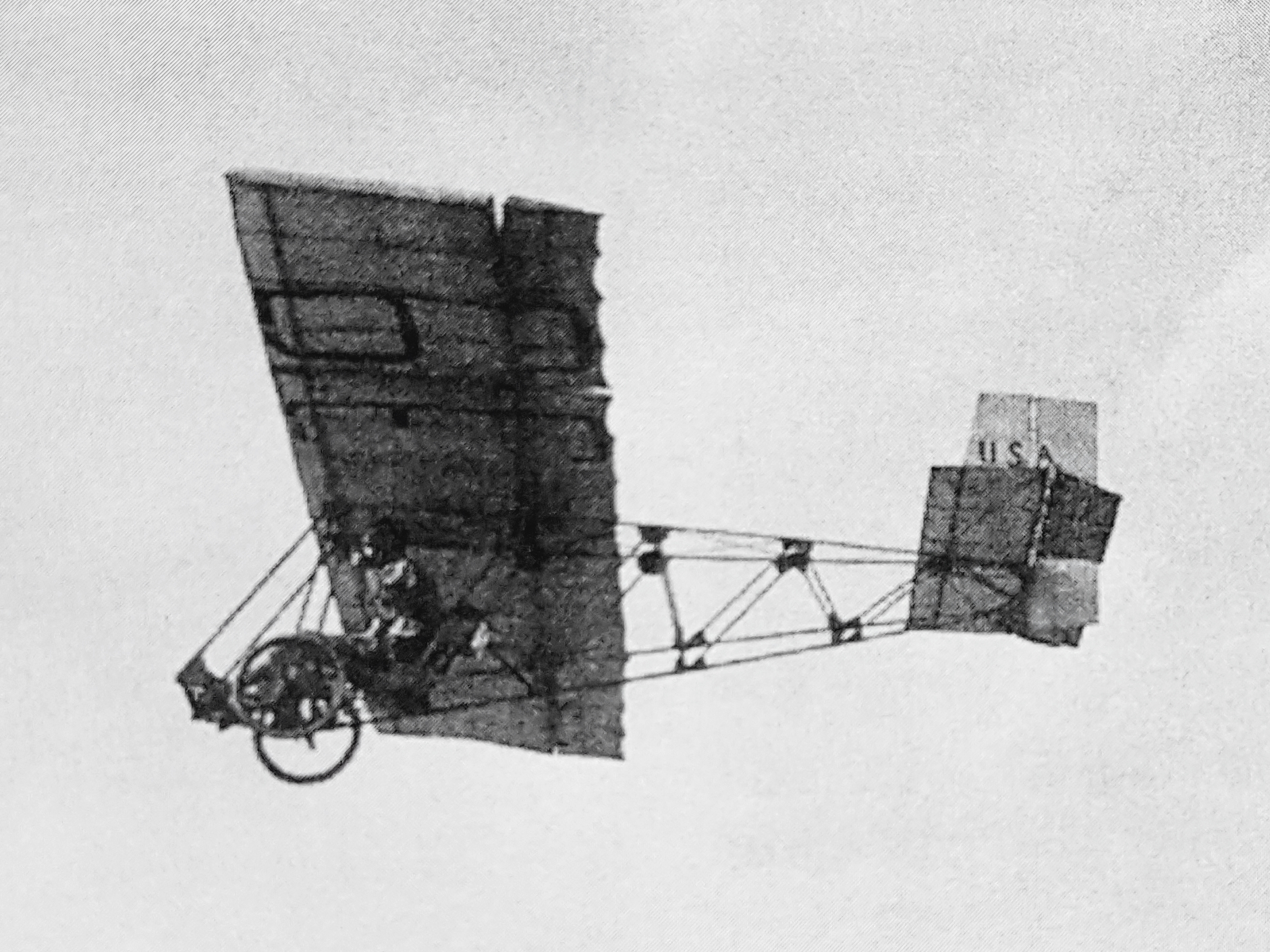
The Allen AES-1 glider in flight, ca 1922

In 1922 Allen designed and built the Allen AES-1 and Allen AES-2 gliders, with E.P. Warner and Otto C. Koppen, at the Aeronautical Engineering Society in New York. From 1923 to 1925, he worked as a freelance test pilot and also worked as a civilian test pilot at McCook Field. From July 1925 to mid-1927, he flew rebuilt de Havilland DH-4s as an airmail pilot for the Post Office Department over the treacherous Rocky Mountain routes between Cheyenne and Salt Lake City, sometimes under extremely adverse conditions. On 1 September 1927, when the Post Office got out of the flying business, Allen joined Boeing Air Transport, flying Boeing 40As as an airmail pilot on their new Chicago to San Francisco run. Over the next five years he began to do more and more test flying, particularly for Boeing Airplane Company, an affiliate of the Boeing Air Transport which later became United Airlines. In 1929, Allen was one of several pilots, including Melvin N. Gough, William H. McAvoy, and Thomas Carroll, NACA trained "in stability and control research techniques, including the ability to reach and hold equilibrium flight conditions with accuracy. As with all good research test pilots, the NACA group worked closely with flight test engineers and in fact took part in discussing NACA's flying qualities work with outsiders. All of this helped lay the groundwork for the comprehensive flying qualities research that followed." By 1932, Allen was a highly respected independent test pilot and consulting aeronautical engineer.

As a freelance pilot, Allen was the first to fly Boeing airplanes, Douglas airplanes, Northrop airplanes and other airplanes. Below is a list of airplanes flown by Allen:

- Boeing Model 83, the forerunner of the famous Boeing F4Bs and Boeing P-12s (25 June 1928)
- Northrop Alpha (March 1930)
- Boeing Monomail (22 May 1930)
- Northrop Beta (3 March 1931)
- Northrop Gamma (1932)
- Stearman 80 (10 April 1933)
- Douglas DC-2 (11 May 1934)
- North American NA-16 (1 April 1935)
- Sikorsky S-43 (5 June 1935)
- Spartan Executive (8 March 1937)
- Sikorsky XPBS-1 (14 August 1937)
- Boeing XB-15 (15 October 1937)
- Boeing 314 Clipper (7 June 1938)
- Boeing 307 Stratoliner (31 December 1938)

He was also involved in the test flying of the Douglas DC-1 and the Consolidated XPB2Y-1.

=== World War II ===
In April 1939, Boeing gave Allen a permanent position as the head of the company's Research Division, and direct charge of all flight testing and of aerodynamics and wind tunnel research. In this position, he made the first flights of the:

- Boeing Stearman X-100 (XA-21; 25 January 1939)
- Boeing XPBB Sea Ranger (9 June 1942)
- Boeing B-17B (27 June 1939)
- Boeing B-17C (21 July 1940)
- Boeing B-17D (3 February 1941)
- Boeing B-17E (5 September 1941)
- Boeing B-17F (30 May 1942)
- Boeing XB-29 Superfortress (21 September 1942)

Even his position at Boeing did not stop the Army Air Force from borrowing Allen for the first flight of the Lockheed C-69 Constellation on 9 January 1943. He also piloted the first flight of the Curtiss-Wright CW-20 on 26 March 1940.

Allen did not fit the image of the daredevil test pilot Hollywood promoted. He was very slender, and some described him as frail. He considered himself an engineer as well as a pilot, and insisted the test pilot should be involved in the development of new aircraft, not just fly them. Allen developed a systematic approach to flight testing and set standards that are the basis for modern flight testing. He also formed a dedicated flight-test and aeronautical research organization at Boeing and insisted that the company develop its own high-speed wind tunnel, an idea directly responsible for Boeing being in position to take the leadership in the development of large swept-wing jets.

In 1940, Lockheed built a wind tunnel with the same test section size and speed capability as the University of Washington's wind tunnel. Boeing, realizing they needed a dedicated, in-house wind tunnel, copied Lockheed's design. Theodore von Kármán intervened and recommended the Boeing wind tunnel be designed for airspeeds near the speed of sound. Allen argued for such a wind tunnel and received authorization to build a tunnel, despite the cost estimate of $1 million. Having a wind tunnel (the Boeing Transonic Wind Tunnel) with this capability was directly responsible for Boeing being able to create such designs as the B-47 Stratojet and the 367-80.

=== B-29 Superfortress crash ===
As the United States became involved in World War II, Boeing was awarded a contract to build one of the most technologically advanced airplanes of the war, the B-29 Superfortress. On 21 September 1942, Allen took the first XB-29 on its initial flight and continued as the program's chief pilot. The second prototype first flew on 30 December, this flight being terminated due to a serious engine fire.

On 18 February 1943, the second prototype also experienced an engine fire, which was extinguished, but a second fire erupted. Two crewmen bailed out as the plane narrowly missed downtown Seattle skyscrapers on its southbound approach to Boeing Field, but their parachutes did not deploy in time and they were killed. The aircraft crashed into the Frye Packing Plant just short of the runway; Allen, eight other crewmen, and 19 workers in the meat-processing factory were killed. While fighting the fire in the packing plant, a city fireman was overcome by fumes and succumbed, bringing the death toll to 29.

== Legacy ==
On 23 April 1946, three years after Eddie Allen's death in the crash of XB-29, he was posthumously awarded the Air Medal — an honor rarely bestowed upon a civilian — by direction of the President of the United States.

Eddie Allen's contributions were recognized with some of aviation's greatest awards, including the very first Octave Chanute Award in 1939. On 17 December 1942, he presented the prestigious Wright Brothers lecture, "Flight Testing for Performance and Stability." He was posthumously awarded the Daniel Guggenheim Medal in 1943, the citation for which read: "For major contributions to aeronautics leading to important advances in airplane design, flight research, and airline operation; particularly for the presentation of new methods for operational control and for the development of scientific and systematic methods in the flight testing of aircraft for basic design and performance data." The Boeing Company dedicated its high-speed wind tunnel and aeronautical research laboratories to him. Those facilities are still known today as the Edmund T. Allen Memorial Aeronautical Laboratories. In the 1952 film Above and Beyond, it is mentioned that Allen was killed in a test flight of the B-29.
