= Douglas A-33 =

WW2 American attack aircraft

A-33/Model 8A-5
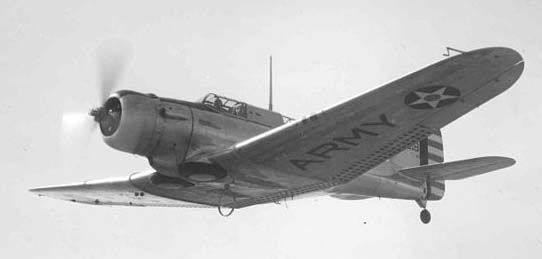
- Northrop A-17/Douglas A-33

General information
- Type: Attack aircraft
- National origin: United States
- Manufacturer: Douglas Aircraft Company
- Primary user: United States Army Air Corps
- Number built: 36

History
- Introduction date: 1941
- Developed from: Northrop A-17

The Douglas A-33 (Model 8A-5) was an American attack aircraft built in small numbers during World War II. It was an updated version of the Northrop A-17, with a more powerful engine and an increased bomb load. While the A-33 was intended initially for the export market, the entire production run was taken up by the United States Army Air Corps.

== Design and development ==
In 1932, the Northrop Corporation had been formed as a partly owned subsidiary of Douglas and by 1937, the Northrop Model 8 became known as the Douglas 8A produced in the El Segundo Division of Douglas aircraft.

The 8A-5 was powered by a 1,200 hp (895 kW) Wright R-1820-87 engine and was the most powerful and best armed of the series, with four wing mounted 0.30 in machine guns, two 0.50 in machine guns in pods below the wing, a rear-firing flexibly mounted 0.30 in gun, and the ability carry up to 2,000 lb of bombs.

== Operational history ==
Early in 1940, the Norwegian government ordered 36 8A-5s which had not been delivered before Norway was invaded by the Germans. Completed between October 1940 and January 1941, the aircraft were delivered to a training center in Canada that had been set up for the Norwegian government-in-exile, named "Little Norway" at Toronto Island Airport, Ontario.

After the loss of two aircraft and a reassessment of the training needs now met by the use of other aircraft, the remaining 34 Model 8A-5Ps were sold to Peru. However, 31 were repossessed by the Army Air Corps at the start of World War II. These aircraft, designated A-33, were used for training, target tug, and utility duties.

== Variants ==
Model 8A-5
A-33
Serial numbers: 42-13584/13601; 42-109007/109019

== Operators ==
Norway

- Little Norway

Peru
United States

- United States Army Air Corps

== Specifications (A-33) ==
Data from McDonnell Douglas Aircraft since 1920

General characteristics

- Crew: 2
- Length: 32 ft 6 in (9.91 m)
- Wingspan: 47 ft 9 in (14.55 m)
- Height: 9 ft 4 in (2.84 m)
- Wing area: 363 sq ft (33.7 m^{2})
- Airfoil: root: NACA 2215; tip: NACA 2209
- Empty weight: 5,510 lb (2,499 kg)
- Gross weight: 8,600 lb (3,901 kg)
- Max takeoff weight: 9,200 lb (4,173 kg)
- Powerplant: 1 × Wright GR-1820-G205A Cyclone 9-cylinder air-cooled radial piston engine, 1,200 hp (890 kW)
- Propellers: 3-bladed variable-pitch propeller

Performance

- Maximum speed: 248 mph (399 km/h, 216 kn) at 15,700 ft (4,800 m)
- Service ceiling: 29,000 ft (8,800 m)
- Time to altitude: 10,000 ft (3,000 m) in 5 minutes 48 seconds

Armament

- Guns:
  - 4 × forward-firing .30 cal (7.62mm) 1919 Browning machine guns, 500rpg
  - 2 × forward-firing .50 cal M2 Brownings in gun pods, 200rpg
  - 1 × .30 cal (7.62mm) 1919 Browning machine gun in rear cockpit, 1,000 rounds
- Bombs: 2,000lb max load
  - Internal: Up to twenty 20 lb (9.1 kg) bombs in internal racks
  - External: Eight hardpoints under the fuselage, four outboard hardpoints can take 500 lb (230 kg) bombs, all eight can carry 100 lb (45 kg)

== See also ==
Related development

- Northrop A-17

Aircraft of comparable role, configuration, and era

- Curtiss SB2C Helldiver
- Douglas SBD Dauntless
- Fairey Barracuda
- Fairey Fulmar
- Ilyushin Il-2
- Junkers Ju 187
- Sukhoi Su-6
- Mitsubishi Ki-51
- Vultee Vengeance
- Yokosuka D4Y
