= Pekin, North Dakota =

- City
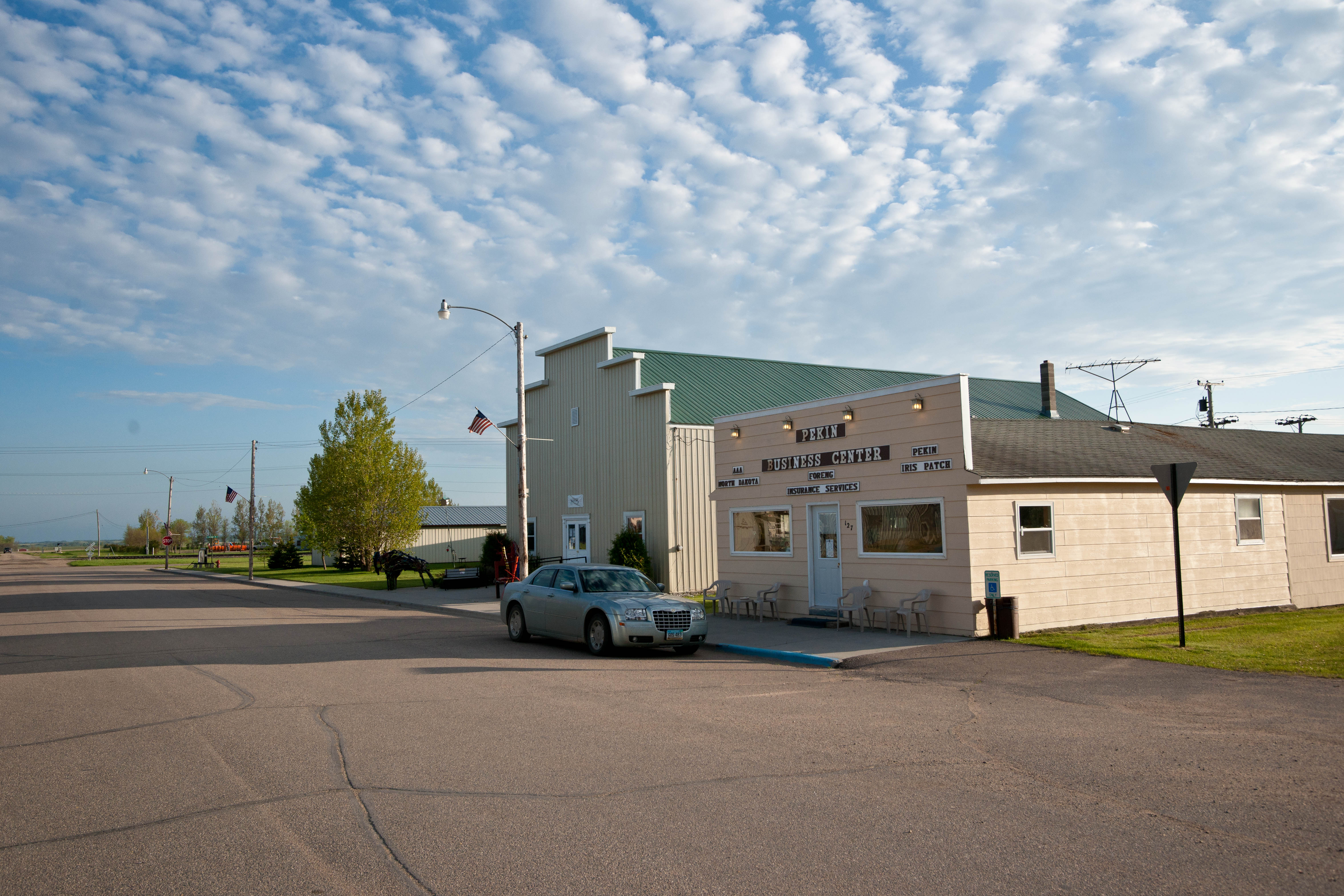
- Pekin Business Center in Pekin

- Location of Pekin, North Dakota
- Coordinates: 47°47′31″N 98°19′40″W
- Country: United States
- State: North Dakota
- County: Nelson
- Founded: 1906

Area
  - Total: 0.25 sq mi (0.65 km^{2})
  - Land: 0.25 sq mi (0.65 km^{2})
  - Water: 0 sq mi (0.00 km^{2})
- Elevation: 1,470 ft (448 m)

Population (2020)
  - Total: 75
  - Estimate (2022): 75
  - Density: 296.6/sq mi (114.51/km^{2})
- Time zone: UTC-6 (Central (CST))
  - Summer (DST): UTC-5 (CDT)
- ZIP code: 58361
- Area code: 701
- FIPS code: 38-61460
- GNIS feature ID: 1036215
- Website: pekinnd.com

Pekin (/ˈpiːkɪn/ PEEK-in) is a city in Nelson County, North Dakota, United States. The population was 75 at the 2020 census. The first European settlers immigrated to the area in the mid-19th century and Pekin was founded in 1906.

== Geography ==
According to the United States Census Bureau, the city has a total area of 0.25 square miles (0.65 km^{2}), all land.

== Demographics ==
Historical population
Census	Pop.	Note	%±
1920	197		—
1930	210		6.6%
1940	229		9.0%
1950	221		−3.5%
1960	180		−18.6%
1970	120		−33.3%
1980	101		−15.8%
1990	101		0.0%
2000	80		−20.8%
2010	70		−12.5%
2020	75		7.1%
2022 (est.)	75		0.0%
U.S. Decennial Census; 2020 Census

=== 2010 census ===
As of the census of 2010, there were 70 people, 34 households, and 18 families residing in the city. The population density was 280.0 inhabitants per square mile (108.1/km^{2}). There were 50 housing units at an average density of 200.0 per square mile (77.2/km^{2}). The racial makeup of the city was 92.9% White and 7.1% from two or more races. Hispanic or Latino of any race were 7.1% of the population.

There were 34 households, of which 20.6% had children under the age of 18 living with them, 44.1% were married couples living together, 5.9% had a female householder with no husband present, 2.9% had a male householder with no wife present, and 47.1% were non-families. 41.2% of all households were made up of individuals, and 23.6% had someone living alone who was 65 years of age or older. The average household size was 2.06 and the average family size was 2.78.

The median age in the city was 53 years. 15.7% of residents were under the age of 18; 8.6% were between the ages of 18 and 24; 19.9% were from 25 to 44; 21.3% were from 45 to 64; and 34.3% were 65 years of age or older. The gender makeup of the city was 55.7% male and 44.3% female.

=== 2000 census ===
As of the census of 2000, there were 80 people, 41 households, and 20 families residing in the city. The population density was 310.2 inhabitants per square mile (119.8/km^{2}). There were 63 housing units at an average density of 244.3 per square mile (94.3/km^{2}). The racial makeup of the city was 100.00% White.

There were 41 households, out of which 19.5% had children under the age of 18 living with them, 36.6% were married couples living together, 4.9% had a female householder with no husband present, and 51.2% were non-families. 46.3% of all households were made up of individuals, and 31.7% had someone living alone who was 65 years of age or older. The average household size was 1.95 and the average family size was 2.75.

In the city, the population was spread out, with 22.5% under the age of 18, 5.0% from 18 to 24, 16.3% from 25 to 44, 33.8% from 45 to 64, and 22.5% who were 65 years of age or older. The median age was 50 years. For every 100 females, there were 95.1 males. For every 100 females age 18 and over, there were 100.0 males.

The median income for a household in the city was $19,063, and the median income for a family was $31,250. Males had a median income of $27,250 versus $16,667 for females. The per capita income for the city was $11,422. There were no families and 9.0% of the population living below the poverty line, including no under eighteens and 22.2% of those over 64.

== Notable people ==
- Edward Henry Allen, World War II era Navy Cross recipient
- Christopher Bollas, psychoanalyst and writer
