= Northrop A-17 =

American attack aircraft

A-17 / Nomad
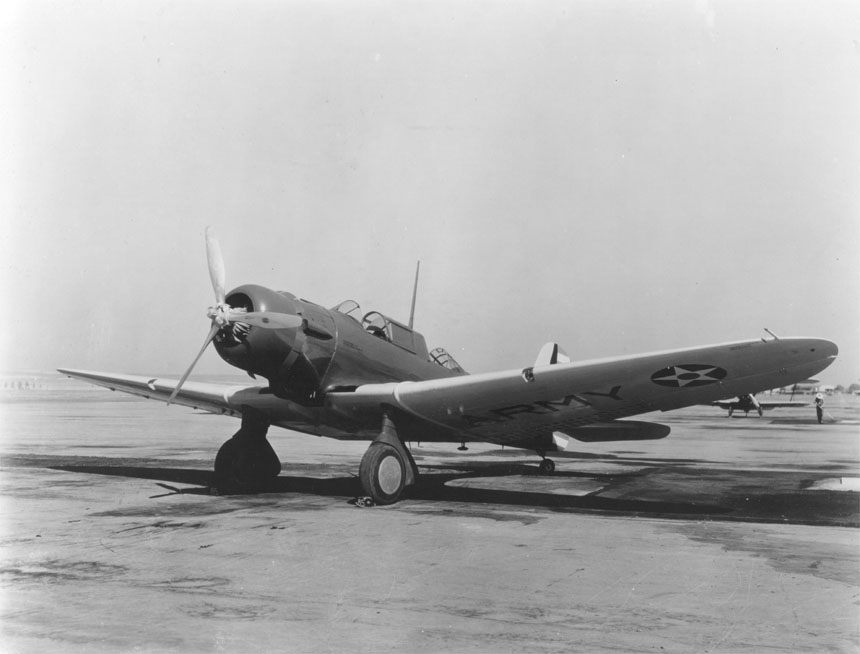
- Northrop A-17

General information
- Type: Ground attack
- Manufacturer: Northrop
- Designer: Jack Northrop
- Primary users: United States Army Air Corps Swedish Air Force; South African Air Force; Royal Canadian Air Force
- Number built: 411

History
- Introduction date: 1935
- Developed from: Northrop Gamma
- Variants: Douglas A-33; Northrop N-3PB Nomad

The Northrop A-17, also known as the Northrop Model 8, a development of the Northrop Gamma 2F model, is a two-seat, single-engine, monoplane, attack bomber built in 1935 by the Northrop Corporation for the United States Army Air Corps. When in British Commonwealth service during World War II, the A-17 was called Nomad.

== Development and design ==
The Northrop Gamma 2F was an attack bomber derivative of the Northrop Gamma transport aircraft, developed in parallel with the Northrop Gamma 2C, (Note: Only one was built.) designated the YA-13 and XA-16. The Gamma 2F had a revised tail, cockpit canopy and wing flaps compared with the Gamma 2C, and was fitted with new semi-retractable landing gear. It was delivered to the United States Army Air Corps for tests on 6 October 1934, and after modifications which included fitting with a conventional fixed landing gear, was accepted by the Air Corps. A total of 110 aircraft were ordered as the A-17 in 1935.

The resulting A-17 was equipped with perforated flaps, and had a fixed landing gear with partial fairings. It was fitted with an internal fuselage bomb bay, that carried fragmentation bombs and external bomb racks. Northrop developed a new landing gear, this time completely retractable, producing the A-17A variant. This version was again purchased by the Army Air Corps, who placed orders for 129 aircraft. By the time these were delivered, the Northrop Corporation had been taken over by Douglas Aircraft Company, with export models being known as the Douglas Model 8.

== Operational history ==
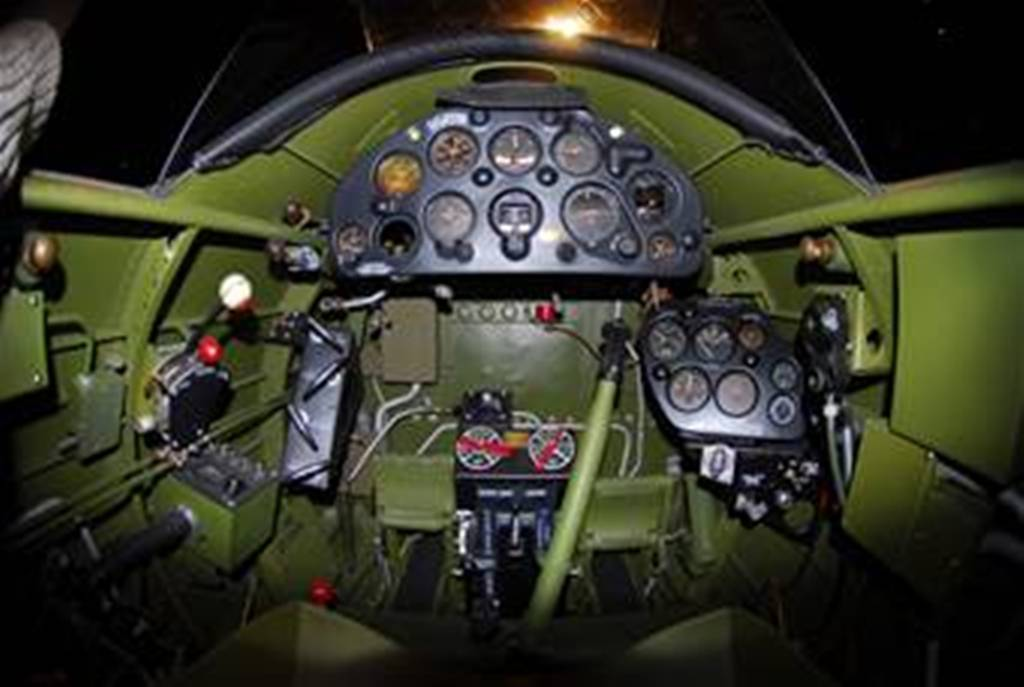
A-17A cockpit

=== United States ===
The A-17 entered service in February 1936, and proved to be a reliable and popular aircraft. However, in 1938, the Air Corps decided that attack aircraft should be multi-engine, rendering the A-17 surplus to requirements. From 14 December 1941, A-17s were used for coastal patrols by the 59th Bombardment Squadron (Light) on the Pacific side of the Panama Canal. The last remaining A-17s, used as utility aircraft, were retired from USAAF service in 1944.

=== Other countries ===
==== Argentina ====
Argentina purchased 30 Model 8A-2s in 1937 and received them between February and March 1938; their serial numbers were between 348 and 377. These remained in front line service until replaced by the I.Ae. 24 Calquin, continuing in service as trainers and reconnaissance aircraft until their last flight in 1954.

==== Peru ====
Peru ordered ten Model 8A-3Ps, these being delivered from 1938. These aircraft were used in combat by Peru in the Ecuadorian–Peruvian War of July 1941. The survivors of these aircraft were supplemented by 13 Model 8A-5s from Norway (see below), delivered via the United States in 1943 (designated A-33). These remained in service until 1958.

==== Sweden ====
The Swedish government purchased a license for production of a Mercury-powered version, building 63 B 5Bs and 31 B 5Cs, production taking place from 1938 to 1941. They were replaced in service with the Swedish Air Force by SAAB 17s from 1944. The Swedish version was used as a dive bomber and as such, it featured prominently in the 1941 film Första divisionen.

==== The Netherlands ====
The Netherlands, in urgent need of modern combat aircraft, placed an order for 18 Model 8A-3Ns in 1939, with all being delivered by the end of the year. Used in a fighter role for which they were unsuited, the majority were destroyed by Luftwaffe attacks on 10 May 1940, the first day of the German invasion.

==== Iraq ====
Iraq purchased 15 Model 8A-4s in 1939. They arrived in Iraq in September 1940. Twelve of them were destroyed in the Anglo-Iraqi War in 1941, and one of the three remaining aircraft crashed in early 1944.

==== Norway ====
Norway ordered 36 Model 8A-5Ns in 1940. These were not ready by the time of Operation Weserübung the German invasion of Norway and were diverted to the Norwegian training camp in Canada, which became known as Little Norway. Norway decided to sell 18 of these aircraft as surplus to Peru, but these were embargoed by the United States, who requisitioned the aircraft, using them as trainers, designating them the A-33. Norway sold their surviving aircraft to Peru in 1943.

==== Great Britain ====
In June 1940, 93 ex-USAAC aircraft were purchased by France, and refurbished by Douglas, including being given new engines. These were not delivered before the fall of France and 61 were taken over by the British Purchasing Commission for British Commonwealth use under the name Northrop Nomad Mk I.

==== South Africa ====
After the RAF assessed the Northrop Nomad Mk Is as "obsolete", most of the Nomads were sent to South Africa for use as trainers and target tugs. The Nomads suffered shortages of spare parts (particularly engines) and from 1942 were gradually replaced by Fairey Battles. The last Nomads were retired in 1944.

==== Canada ====
The Royal Canadian Air Force received 32 Nomads that had been part of a French order of 93 aircraft. When France fell in 1940, this order was taken over by Great Britain who transferred 32 of the aircraft to Canada, where they were used as advanced trainers and target tugs as part of the British Commonwealth Air Training Plan. These wore the serial numbers 3490 to 3521; all were assigned to No. 3 Training Command RCAF.

== Variants ==
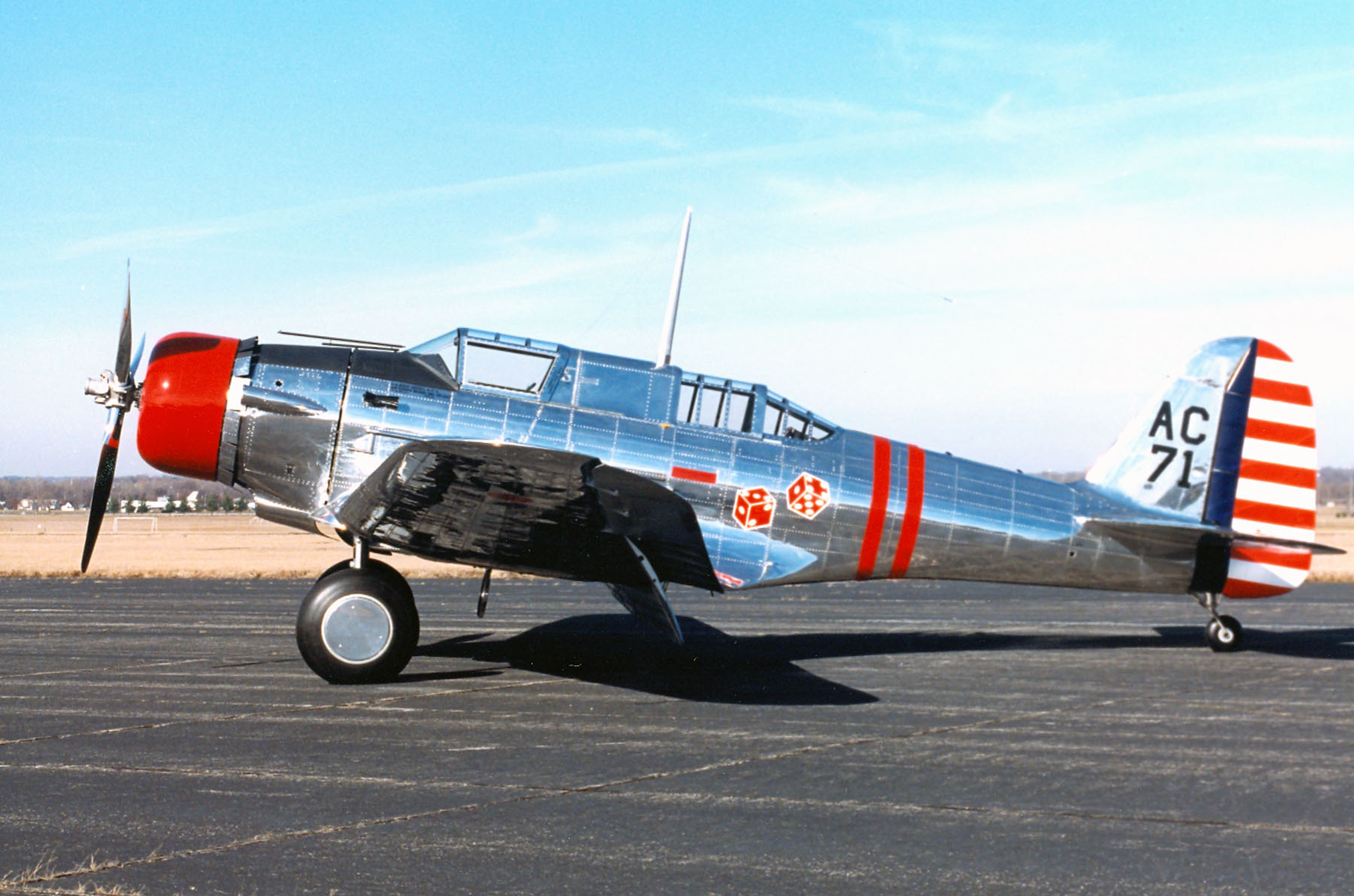
A-17A 36-0207

A-17
Initial production for USAAC. Fixed gear, powered by 750 hp (560 kW) Pratt & Whitney R-1535-11 Twin Wasp Jr engine; 110 built.
A-17A
Revised version for USAAC with retractable gear and 825 hp (615 kW) R-1535-13 engine; 129 built.
A-17AS
Three seat staff transport version for USAAC. Powered by 600 hp (450 kW) Pratt & Whitney R-1340 Wasp engine; two built.
Model 8A-1
Export version for Sweden. Fixed gear. Two Douglas built prototypes (Swedish designation B 5A), followed by 63 licensed built (by ASJA) B 5B aircraft powered by 920 hp (690 kW) Bristol Mercury XXIV engine; 31 similar B 5C built by SAAB.
Model 8A-2
Version for Argentina. Fitted with fixed gear, ventral gun position and powered by 840 kW (1,130 hp) Wright R-1820-G3 Cyclone; 30 built.
Model 8A-3N
Version of A-17A for Netherlands. Powered by 1,100 hp (820 kW) Pratt & Whitney R-1830 Twin Wasp S3C-G engine; 18 built.
Model 8A-3P
Version of A-17A for Peru. Powered by 1,000 hp (750 kW) GR-1820-G103 engine; ten built (c/n 412 to 421).
Model 8A-4
Version for Iraq, powered by a 1,000 hp (750 kW) GR-1820-G103 engine; 15 built.
Model 8A-5N
Version for Norway, powered by 1,200 hp (890 kW) GR-1830-G205A engine; 36 built. Later impressed into USAAF service as Douglas A-33.
Nomad Mk.I
RAF and RCAF designation for A-17As refurbished for French use but delivered to the UK and Canada.

== Operators ==
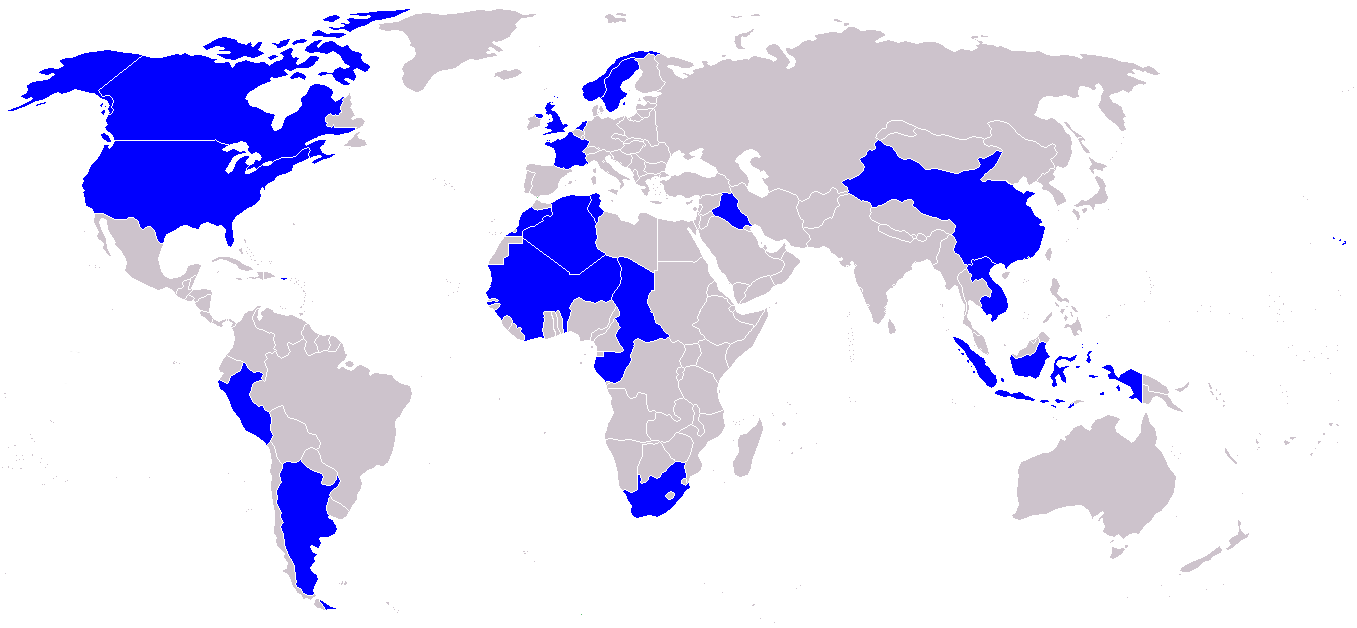
Operators of the A-17

Argentina

- Fuerza Aérea Argentina
  - Grupo "A" de la Escuela de Aplicación de Aviación ("'A' Group, School of Aviation Administration"), El Palomar Air Base
  - Regimiento Aéreo Nº3 de Bombardeo Liviano ("3rd Light Bombing Air Regiment"), El Plumerillo Air Base

Canada

- Royal Canadian Air Force
  - No. 3 Training Command

China

- Chinese Nationalist Air Force

Iraq

- Royal Iraqi Air Force

Netherlands

- Luchtvaartafdeeling

Norway

- Norwegian Air Force
  - Norwegian Training Unit

Peru

- Peruvian Air Force

South Africa

- South African Air Force

Sweden

- Swedish Air Force

United States

- United States Army Air Corps
  - General Headquarters Air Force
  - 3d Attack Group, Barksdale Field
  - 17th Attack Group, March Field
  - 16th Pursuit Group, Albrook Field
    - 74th Attack Squadron

== Surviving aircraft ==
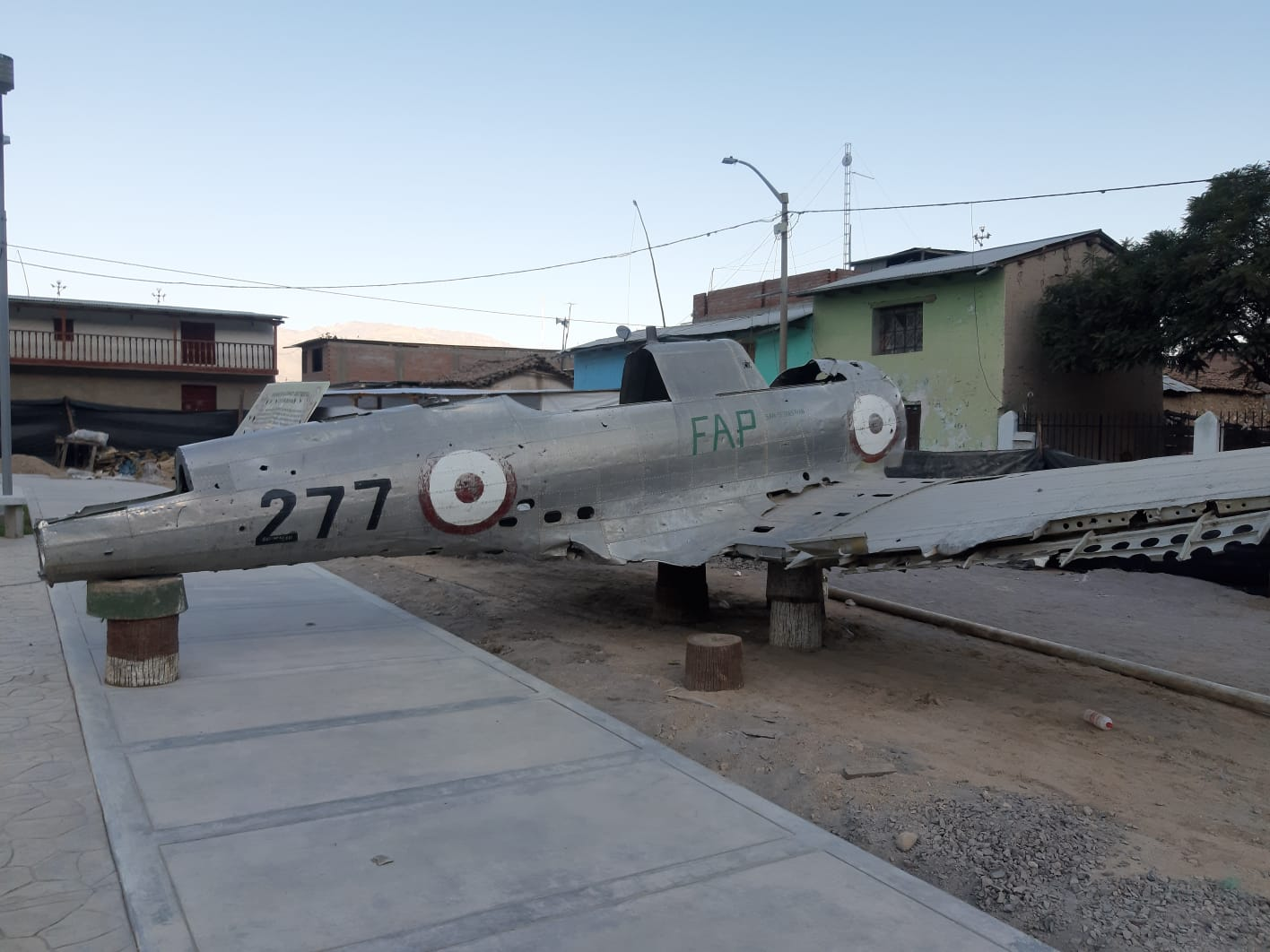
Remains of 8A-3P FAP-277 at San Sebastián de Sacraca, Peru.

- A-17A, U.S. Army Ser. No. 36-0207 c/n 234, ex-3rd Attack Group (Barksdale Field). On display at the National Museum of the United States Air Force at Wright-Patterson AFB in Dayton, Ohio
- 8A-3P c/n 415, registration FAP-277. This aircraft crash landed on 12 January 1957 at San Sebastián de Sacraca, Ayacucho, Peru. The remains are preserved as monument at the town's main square.
- 8A-3P c/n 417, registration FAP-279, ex-31^{o} Escuadrón de Ataque y Reconocimiento. On display next to Armando Revoredo's mausoleum, Grupo Aéreo N°8, Callao, Peru, painted as "XXXI-1" to resemble the aircraft flown by Revoredo in 1940 during the "Los Zorros" raid over South America.
- RCAF Nomad 3521, crashed in Lake Muskoka, Ontario on 13 December 1940, after a mid-air collision with another Nomad during a search for a missing aircraft. The wreck was found in July 2010 and both the aircraft and the crew's remains were recovered by the RCAF. The mortal remains of RAF Lieutenant Peter Campbell and RCAF Leading Aircraftsman Theodore "Ted" Bates, were recovered in October 2012 and interred with full military honors in a cemetery in Guelph, ON in September 2013. The recovered aircraft will be put on display at the National Air Force Museum of Canada, Trenton, Ontario.

== Specifications (A-17A) ==
Data from McDonnell Douglas Aircraft since 1920

General characteristics

- Crew: two (pilot and gunner)
- Length: 31 ft 8.6 in (9.67 m)
- Wingspan: 47 ft 8.5 in (14.54 m)
- Height: 11 ft 10.5 in (3.62 m)
- Wing area: 363 sq ft (33.7 m^{2})
- Airfoil: root: NACA 2215; tip: NACA 2209
- Empty weight: 4,874 lb (2,211 kg)
- Gross weight: 7,337 lb (3,328 kg)
- Powerplant: 1 × Pratt & Whitney R-1535-11 Twin Wasp Jr two-row air-cooled radial engine, 750 hp (560 kW)

Performance

- Maximum speed: 206 mph (332 km/h, 179 kn)
- Cruise speed: 170 mph (274 km/h, 149 kn)
- Range: 650 mi (1,046 km, 565 nmi)
- Service ceiling: 19,400 ft (5,915 m)
- Rate of climb: 1,350 ft/min (6.9 m/s)

Armament

- 4 × 0.3 in (7.62 mm) fixed forward M1919 Browning machine guns
- 1 × 0.3 in (7.62 mm) trainable rear machine gun
- Internal bay for bombs
- External wing bomb racks (total bomb load 1,200 lb/544 kg)

== See also ==
- Lick Observatory

Related development

- Douglas A-33
- Northrop BT
- Northrop Gamma
- Northrop YA-13

Aircraft of comparable role, configuration, and era

- Fairey Battle
- Kawasaki Ki-32
- Mitsubishi B5M
- Mitsubishi Ki-30
- Nakajima B5N
- PZL.23 Karaś
- Sukhoi Su-2

Related lists

- List of aircraft of the Royal Air Force
- List of aircraft of World War II
- List of military aircraft of the United States
