= Edward Alleyn (disambiguation) =

Edward Alleyn (1566–1626) was an English actor.

Edward Alleyn may also refer to:

- Edward Alleyn (Massachusetts politician) (died 1642), early American politician
- Sir Edward Alleyn, 1st Baronet of the Alleyn baronets

== See also ==
- Edward Allen (disambiguation)
