= Northrop C-19 Alpha =

American transport aircraft

YC-19 Alpha
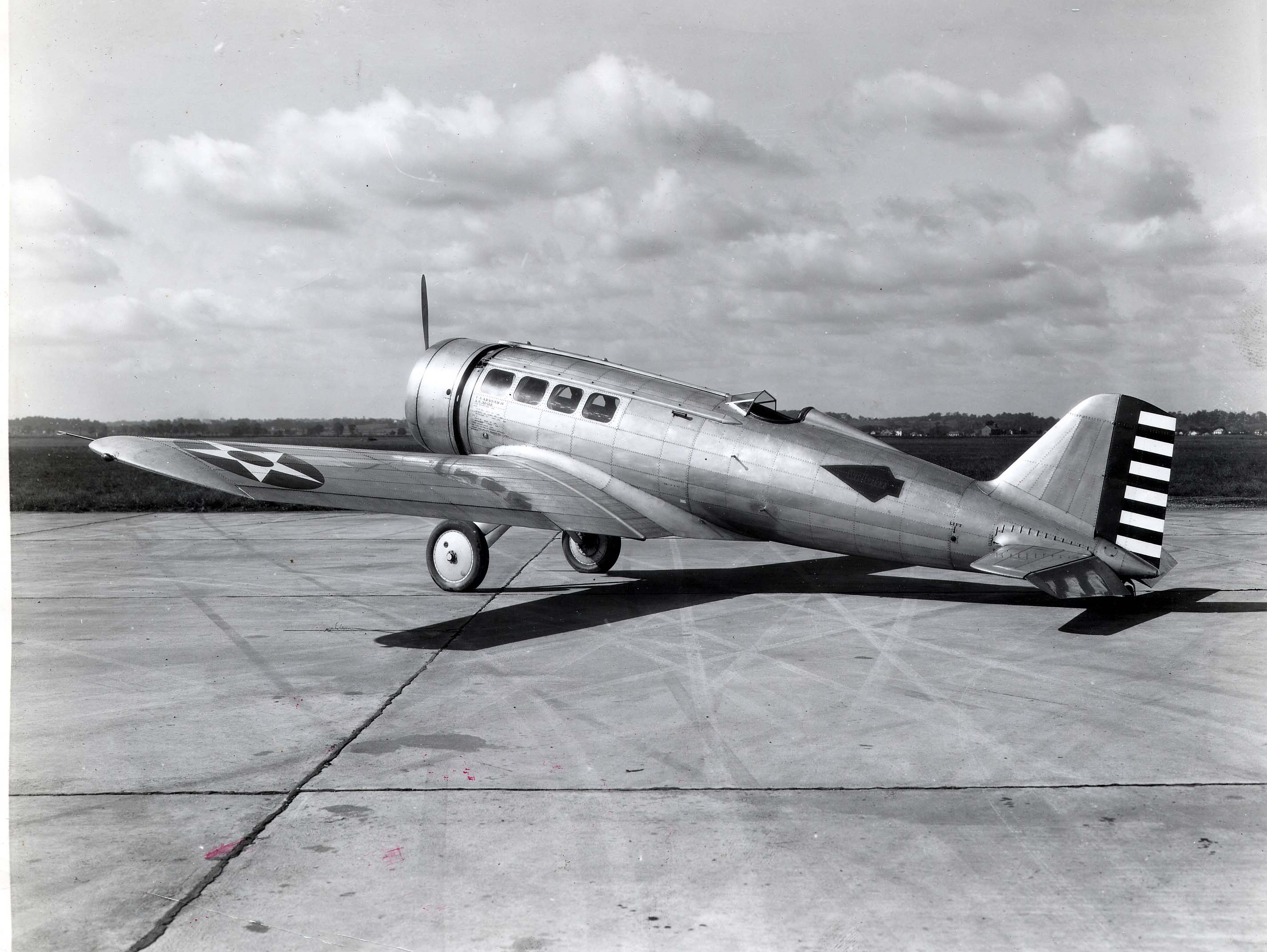
- Northrop Y1C-19

General information
- Type: Transport
- Manufacturer: Northrop
- Designer: John K. Northrop
- Primary user: US Army Air Corps
- Number built: 3

History
- Introduction date: 1931
- First flight: 1930 (Northrop Alpha)
- Developed from: Northrop Alpha

The Northrop C-19 Alpha was a series of three aircraft purchased from Northrop by the US Army Air Corps in 1931. They were slightly modified versions of the civil Northrop Alpha Type 2.

== Design and development ==
The YC-19 aircraft were Northrop Alpha 4s supplied for evaluation to the USAAC. No production orders were given. The major difference between the C-19s and the Alphas was that the civilian version carried a pilot and six passengers while the Army version carried a pilot and four passengers.

== Operational history ==
One aircraft, the last of the three purchased, crashed between Richmond and Petersburg, Virginia on Sunday, March 19, 1933, killing its pilot and two passengers. The other aircraft were used for several more years until being sent to training schools as subjects for maintenance and repair classes.

== Variants ==
YC-19
one aircraft, previously an Alpha 4, serial number 31-516
Y1C-19
two aircraft, serial numbers 31–517 to 31-518, Pratt & Whitney R-1340-11 engine

== Operators ==
- United States: US Army Air Corps

== Specifications (Alpha landplane) ==
Data from Janes all the Worlds Aircraft 1931

General characteristics

- Crew: 1
- Capacity: 6 passengers
- Length: 28 ft 4.5 in (8.649 m)
- Wingspan: 41 ft 10 in (12.75 m)
- Height: 9 ft 0 in (2.74 m)
- Wing area: 295 sq ft (27.4 m^{2})
- Airfoil: Clark Y
- Empty weight: 2,660 lb (1,207 kg)

2,900 lb (1,315 kg) Seaplane

- Gross weight: 4,500 lb (2,041 kg)

4,700 lb (2,132 kg) Seaplane

- Powerplant: 1 × Pratt & Whitney R-1340 Wasp 9-cylinder air-cooled radial piston engine, 420 hp (310 kW)
- Propellers: 2-bladed fixed-pitch propeller

Performance

- Maximum speed: 170 mph (270 km/h, 150 kn)

165 mph (143 kn; 266 km/h) Seaplane

- Cruise speed: 145 mph (233 km/h, 126 kn)

140 mph (122 kn; 225 km/h) Seaplane

- Stall speed: 60 mph (97 km/h, 52 kn)
- Range: 650 mi (1,050 km, 560 nmi)
- Service ceiling: 19,300 ft (5,900 m)

18,000 ft (5,486 m) Seaplane

- Absolute ceiling: 21,100 ft (6,431 m)

20,000 ft (6,096 m) Seaplane

- Rate of climb: 1,400 ft/min (7.1 m/s) at sea level

650 ft/min (198 m/min) at 10,000 ft (3,048 m)

1,250 mph (1,086 kn; 2,012 km/h) Seaplane at sea level
550 ft/min (168 m/min) Seaplane at 10,000 ft (3,048 m)

- Wing loading: 15.25 lb/sq ft (74.5 kg/m^{2})

15.9 lb/sq ft (78 kg/m^{2}) Seaplane

- Power/mass: 0.0935 hp/lb (0.1537 kW/kg)

0.0893 hp/lb (0.1468 kW/kg) Seaplane

== See also ==
Related development

- Northrop Alpha

Related lists

- List of military aircraft of the United States
