= Ned Allen =

Scottish footballer

Personal information
- Full name: Edward Allen
- Date of birth: 31 August 1875
- Place of birth: Montrose, Scotland
- Position: Full back

Senior career*
| Years | Team | Apps | (Gls) |
| 1890–1891 | Montrose Renown | | |
| 1891–1892 | Montrose Albert | | |
| 1892–1893 | Montrose Temperance Athletic | | |
| 1893–1894 | Montrose | | |
| 1894–1895 | Dundee Executive | | |
| 1896–1899 | Dundee Wanderers | | |
| 1899–1900 | Millwall Athletic | | |
| 1900–1901 | Newcastle United | 4 | (0) |
| 1901 | Dundee | | |
| 1902 | Watford | | |
| 1903 | Dundee | | |
| Total | | 4 | (0) |
- * Club domestic league appearances and goals

Edward Allen (31 August 1875–unknown) was a Scottish footballer who played in the Football League for Newcastle United.
