= Edward Henry Allen =

United States Navy officer

- Born: March 2, 1908; Pekin, North Dakota, U.S.
- Died: May 7, 1942 (aged 34) at sea Coral Sea
- Military career
- Allegiance: United States of America
- Branch: United States Navy
- Service years: 1931-1942
- Rank: Lieutenant
- Units: Scouting Squadron 2 Lexington (CV-2)
- Conflicts: World War II; *Battle of the Coral Sea
- Awards: Navy Cross and Gold Star in lieu of a second Navy Cross

Edward Henry Allen (March 2, 1908 – May 7, 1942) was a member of the United States Navy who was awarded the Navy Cross and Gold Star for his heroism.

== Navy career ==
Born in Pekin, North Dakota, Allen graduated from the U.S. Naval Academy in 1931. He served with Scouting Squadron 2 in Lexington (CV-2).

== Awarded the Navy Cross and Gold Star ==
Lieutenant Allen was reported missing 7 May 1942 when his plane was shot down by enemy aircraft during the Battle of the Coral Sea. He was awarded a Navy Cross for the defense of his carrier 20 February 1942 and a Gold Star in lieu of a second Navy Cross for the action in which he lost his life.

== Namesake ==
Edward H. Allen (DE-531) was launched 7 October 1943 by Boston Navy Yard; sponsored by Mrs. David H. Clark; and commissioned 16 December 1943, Lieutenant Commander M. M. Sanford in command. The US naval ship Edward H Allen assisted in the rescue of passengers and crew from the stricken Italian luxury liner Andrea Doria when she sank after a collision on approach to New York in 1956.
