= USS Edward H. Allen =

US Destroyer escort

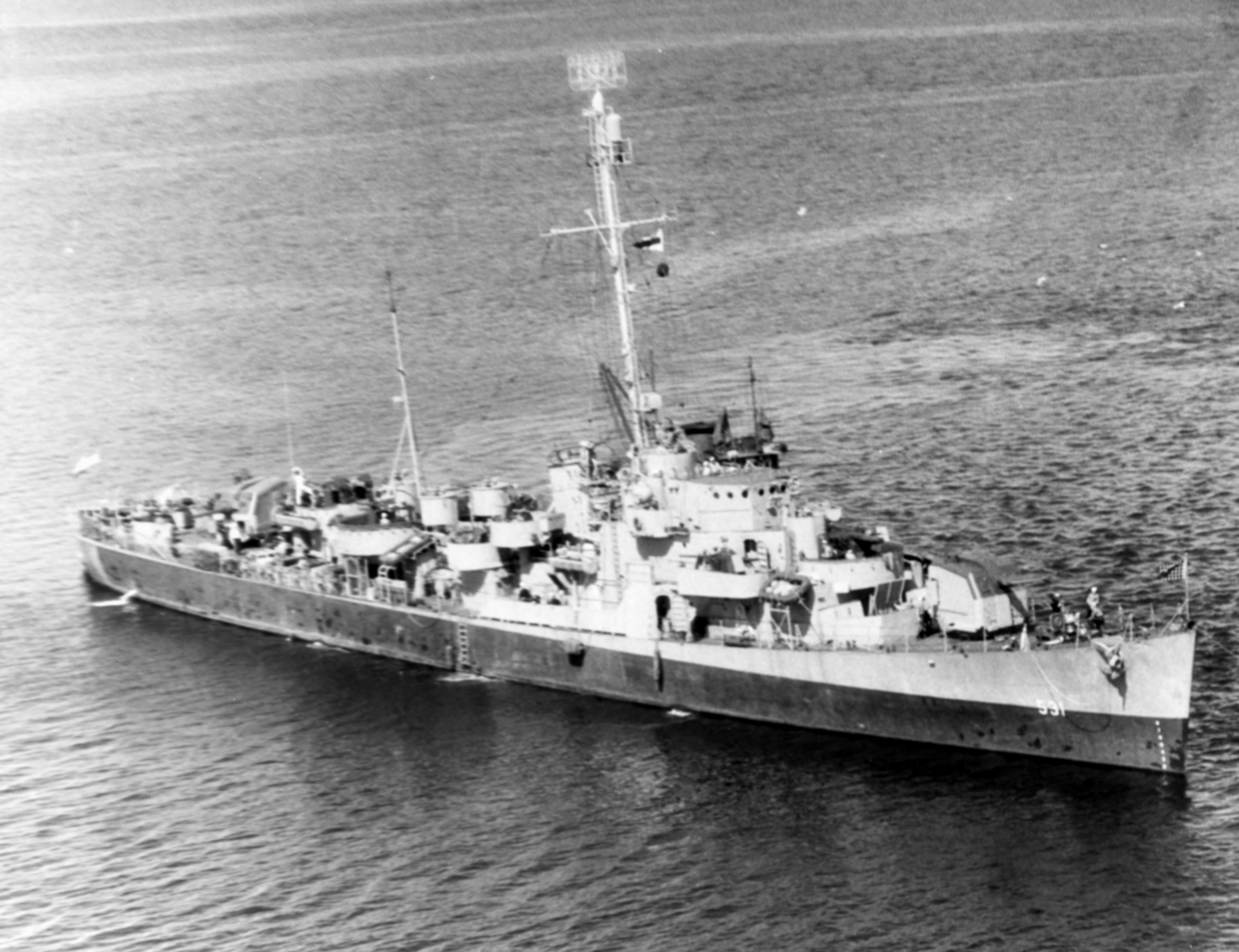

History

United States
- Laid down: 31 August 1943
- Launched: 7 October 1943
- Commissioned: 16 December 1943
- Decommissioned: 10 May 1946
- In service: 26 February 1951
- Out of service: 9 January 1958
- Stricken: 1 July 1972
- Fate: Sold for scrapping 5 February 1974

General characteristics
- Displacement: 1,350 long tons (1,372 t)
- Length: 306 ft (93 m) overall
- Beam: 36 ft 10 in (11.23 m)
- Draft: 13 ft 4 in (4.06 m) maximum
- Propulsion: 2 boilers, 2 geared steam turbines, 12,000 shp, 2 screws
- Speed: 24 knots (44 km/h)
- Range: 6,000 nmi at 12 knots (22 km/h)
- Complement: 14 officers, 201 enlisted
- Armament: 2-5 in (130 mm), 4 (2 × 2) 40 mm AA, 10-20 mm guns AA, 3-21 inch (533 mm) torpedo tubes, 1 Hedgehog, 8 depth charge projectors, 2 depth charge tracks

USS Edward H. Allen (DE-531) was a John C. Butler-class destroyer escort in service with the United States Navy from 1943 to 1946 and from 1951 to 1958. She was sold for scrapping in 1974.

== History ==
Edward H. Allen (DE-531) was named in honor of Lieutenant Edward Henry Allen who was awarded a Navy Cross for his brave actions during the Battle of the Coral Sea. She was launched 7 October 1943 by Boston Navy Yard; sponsored by Mrs. David H. Clark; and commissioned 16 December 1943.

=== 1943-1946 ===
Edward H. Allen sailed from Boston, Massachusetts, 6 March 1944 for Miami, Florida, to serve as schoolship for pre-commissioning crews of escort vessels. She had similar duty at Norfolk, Virginia, from June to November 1944, then returned to Miami until 10 June 1945. She was at Casco Bay preparing for service in the Pacific Ocean when the war ended, and remained there for experimental operations. After spending Navy Day at Boston, Edward H. Allen sailed to Green Cove Springs, Florida, where she was placed out of commission in reserve 10 May 1946.

=== 1951-1958 ===
Recommissioned 26 February 1951 Edward H. Allen was assigned to the 3rd Naval District and cruised from New York to Florida, Bermuda, and the Caribbean in connection with the Naval Reserve training program. From 13 June to 10 July 1953 and again from 17 June to 15 July 1955 she made extended cruises, visiting ports in France, Portugal, England, Spain, and the Azores.

==== Rescuing Andrea Doria survivors ====
While at sea in July 1956 she was ordered to the scene of the tragic collision of the liners SS Andrea Doria and the SS Stockholm (later renamed MV Astoria) and rescued the captain and 76 of the Doria crew before that vessel sank. Edward H. Allen continued her training duty until again placed out of commission in reserve 9 January 1958. On 1 July 1972 she was struck from the Navy list and, on 5 February 1974, she was sold for scrapping.

== Military awards and honors ==
For her assistance in the rescue of Andrea Doria survivors, the destroyer was thanked by the Italian Government and her commanding officer awarded the Italian Legion of Merit.
