= Northrop Beta =

American monoplane

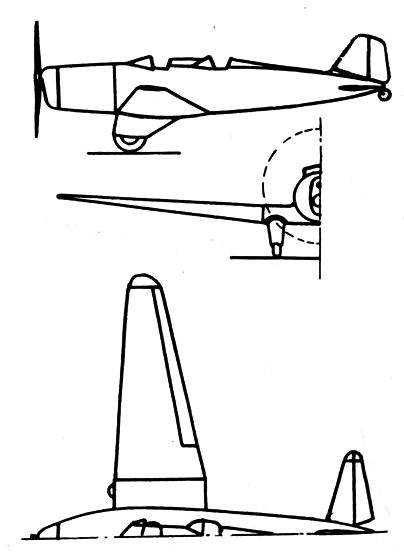
- Northrop Beta 3-view drawing from L'Aerophile Salon 1932

General information
- Type: Sporting Monoplane
- Manufacturer: Northrop
- Designer: Don R. Berlin
- Number built: 2 (1 Beta 3 and 1 Beta 3D)

History
- First flight: 3 March 1931
- Variants: Northrop Alpha; Northrop Gamma

The Northrop Beta was an American single-engine, all-metal, low-wing sporting monoplane built in 1931.

== Design and development ==
The Beta was a two-seater with a 160 hp (119 kW) Menasco Buccaneer inline engine. The first aircraft registered as NX963Y (later NC963Y) crashed in California. The second aircraft, N12214, was built as a single-seater and fitted with a 300 hp (224 kW) Pratt & Whitney Wasp Jr. radial engine, and became the first aircraft of such power to exceed 200 mph (322 km/h). Only two were built.

The aircraft was flown to Wichita for sister company Stearman Aircraft to use as a demonstrator but with the poor economy at the time, none were sold. The aircraft was sold to a wealthy pilot in New York and during its delivery, it passed through Wright Field in order to allow a thorough examination by Army Air Corps Engineers as the Air Corps was still using obsolete biplanes.

After being rarely flown during 1932, the aircraft was sold to a new owner who kept it at Roosevelt Field until it was flipped over at a nearby airport. The aircraft was repaired at the Stearman factory in Wichita and used as an experimental test platform for various flap designs until it crashed due to a wing structural failure on May 4, 1934.

== Specifications (Beta 3D) ==
General characteristics

- Crew: 1
- Length: 66 m (21 ft 8 in)
- Wingspan: 9.75 m (32 ft 0 in)
- Powerplant: 1 × Pratt & Whitney Wasp Jr. radial, 224 kW (300 hp)

Performance

- Maximum speed: 341 km/h (212 mph, 184 kn)
- Cruise speed: 297 km/h (185 mph, 160 kn)

== See also ==
Related development

- Northrop Alpha
- Northrop Gamma
