= Northrop Gamma =

Multi-role aircraft family by Northrop

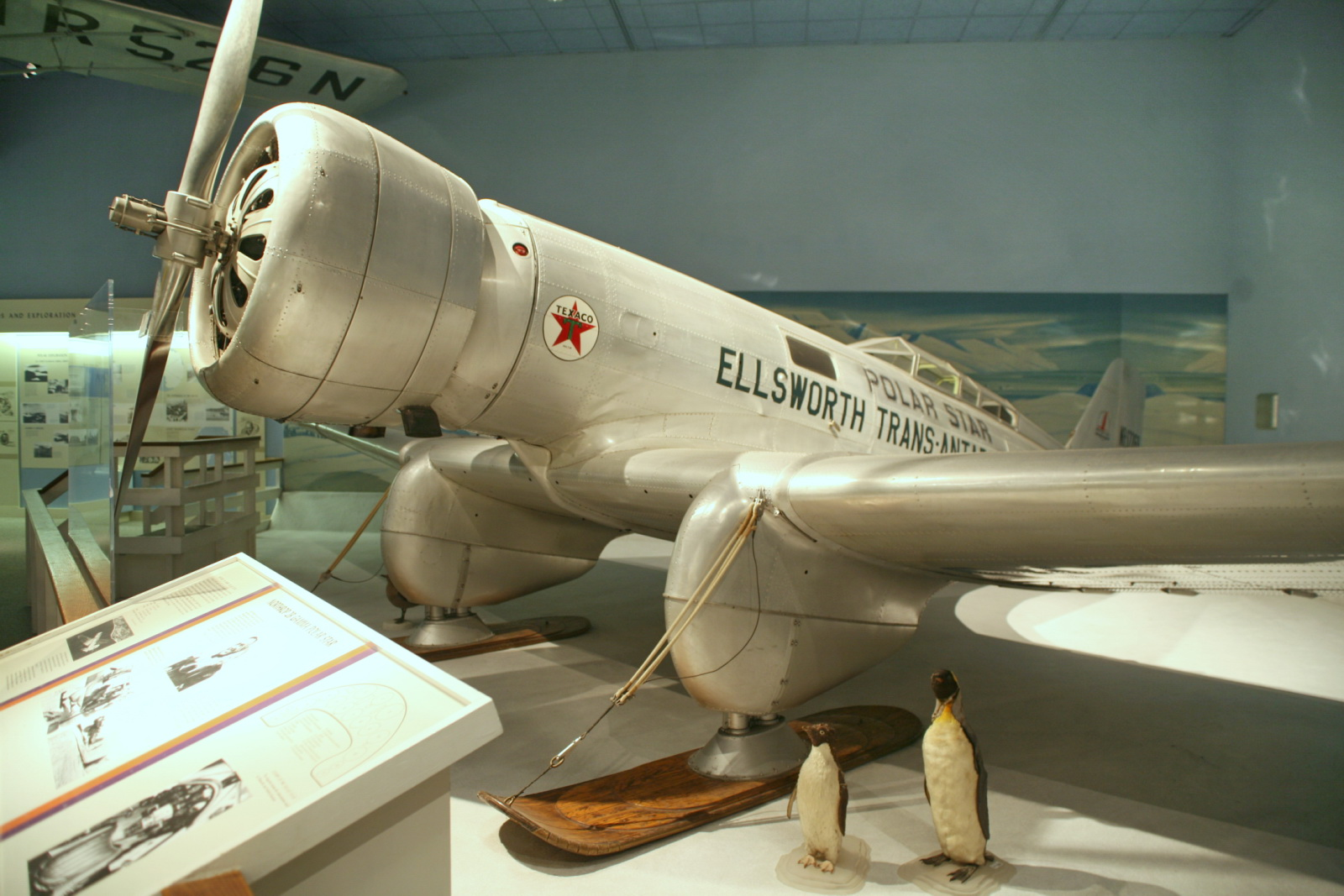
- Northrop 2B Gamma Polar Star

General information
- Type: Civil/Attack
- Manufacturer: Northrop Corporation
- Designer: Jack Northrop
- Number built: 60

History
- Introduction date: 1932
- Developed from: Northrop Alpha
- Variants: Northrop YA-13; Northrop A-17; Northrop Delta

The Northrop Gamma is a single-engine all-metal monoplane cargo aircraft used in the 1930s. Towards the end of its service life, it was developed into the A-17 light bomber.

== Design and development ==
The Gamma was a further development of the successful Northrop Alpha and shared its predecessor's aerodynamic innovations with wing fillets and multicellular stressed-skin wing construction. Like late Alphas, the fixed landing gear was covered in distinctive aerodynamic spats, and the aircraft introduced a fully enclosed cockpit.

== Operational history ==
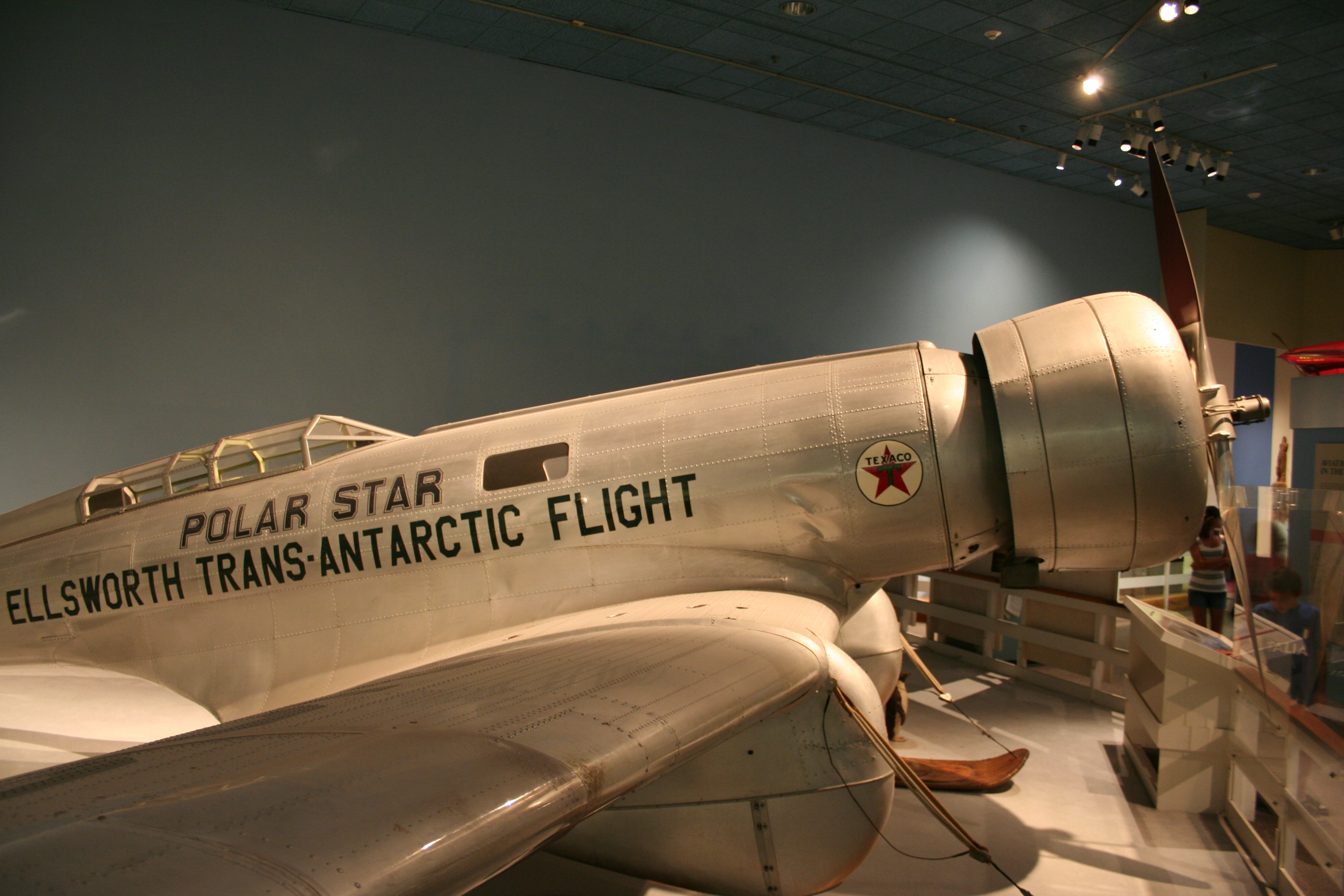
The Polar Star on display at the National Air and Space Museum

The Gamma saw fairly limited civilian service as mail planes with Trans World Airlines but had an illustrious career as a flying laboratory and record-breaking aircraft. The U.S. military found the design sufficiently interesting to encourage Northrop to develop it into what eventually became the Northrop A-17 light attack aircraft. Military versions of the Gamma saw combat with Chinese and Spanish Republican air forces. The wartime Nationalist Air Force of China saw its squadron of Gamma 2Es at Guangde Airbase under surprise attack from IJNAS Mitsubishi G3M bombers on the first-day of an airwar between China and Japan on August 14, 1937, causing only minor damage to a single Curtiss Hawk III fighter-attack plane piloted by Lt. Zhou Tingfang, flying in the air battle of Jianqiao, without any ammunition, feigned attacks against the incoming G3M bomber raid over Guangde, causing the bombs to fall well off-target. Of these Gamma 2Es, twenty-five had been assembled in China from components provided by Northrop; these were deployed in various attack missions during the early stages of the war, particular against Imperial Japanese naval assets. In the morning of 11 November 1937, three Chinese Air Force Northrop 2ECs of the 2nd BG, 14th Squadron led by Capt. Yu attacked the IJN fleet aircraft carrier Kaga off the Ma'anshan Islands; the bombs fell wide into Kaga's wake, and the Chinese Gammas were pursued and intercepted by three A5Ms of Kaga's combat air patrol led by flight leader Jirō Chōno, shooting down two (Gammas no. 1405 of Sung I-Ching and Li Xi-Yong, and no. 1402 of Peng Te-Ming and Li Huan-Chieh) while Yu managed to escape into the clouds and return his damaged Gamma to base.

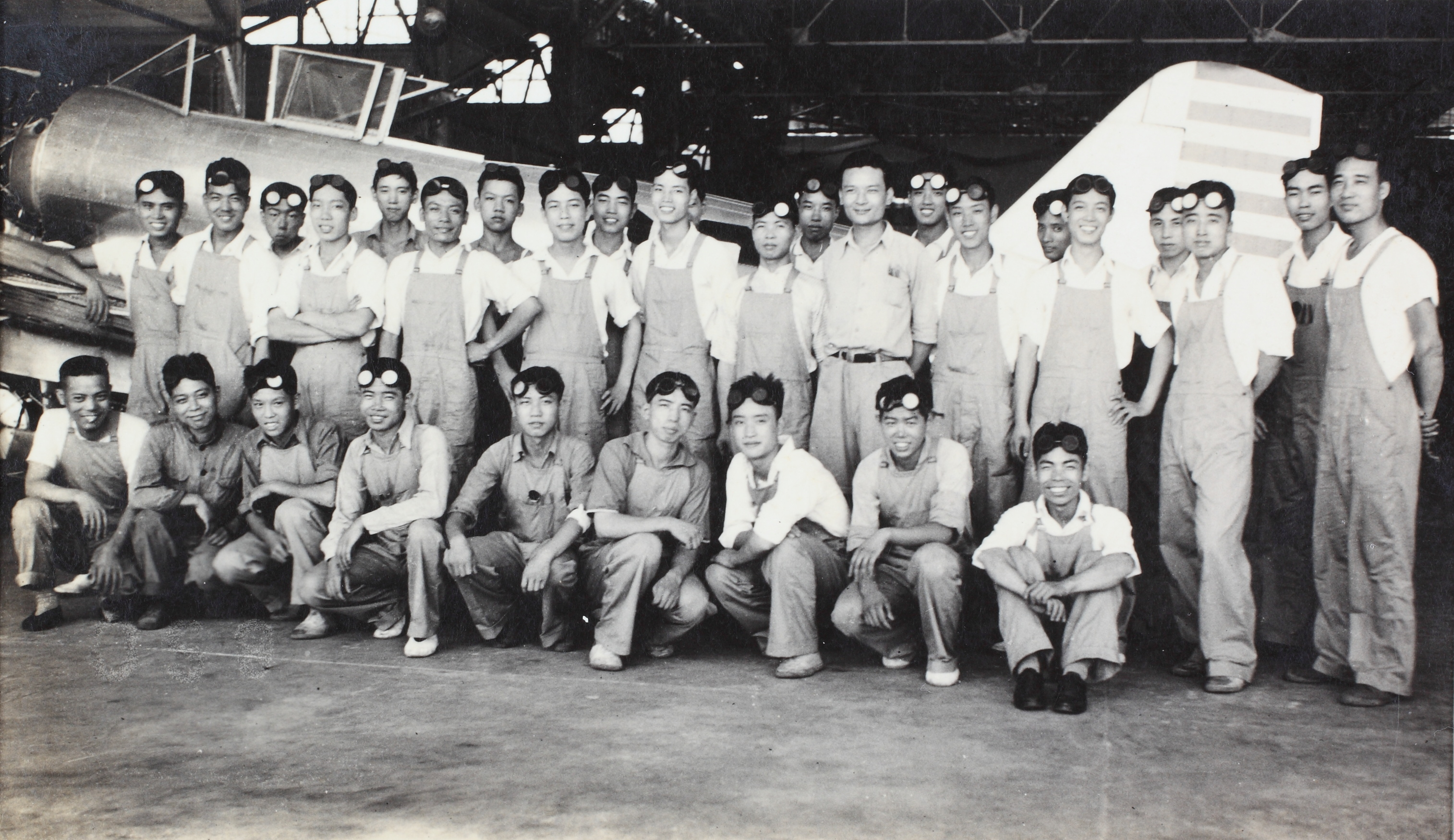
Workers at the CAMCO plant at the Jianqiao Aerodrome standing before the assembly of a Gamma 2E; circa 1936

On June 2, 1933 Frank Hawks flew his Gamma 2A "Sky Chief" from Los Angeles to New York in a record 13 hours, 26 minutes, and 15 seconds. In 1935, Howard Hughes improved on this time in a modified Gamma 2G leased from Jacqueline Cochran, making the west-east transcontinental run in 9 hours, 26 minutes, and 10 seconds.

The most famous Gamma was the Polar Star. The aircraft was carried via ship and offloaded onto the pack ice in the Ross Sea during Lincoln Ellsworth's 1934 expedition to Antarctica. The Gamma was almost lost when the ice underneath it broke, and had to be returned to the United States for repairs. Polar Star's second assignment to Antarctica in September 1934 was also futile — a connecting rod broke and the aircraft had to be returned yet again for repairs. On January 3, 1935, Ellsworth and pilot Bernt Balchen finally flew over Antarctica.

On November 23, 1935, Ellsworth and Canadian pilot Herbert Hollick-Kenyon attempted the world's first trans-Antarctic flight from Dundee Island in the Weddell Sea to Little America. The crew made four stops during their journey, in the process becoming the first people ever to visit Western Antarctica. During one stop, a blizzard completely packed the fuselage with snow which took a day to clear out. On December 5, after traveling over 2,400 miles (3,900 km) the aircraft ran out of fuel just 25 miles (40 km) short of the goal. The intrepid crew took six days to travel the remainder of the journey and stayed in the abandoned Richard E. Byrd camp until being found by the Discovery II research vessel on January 15, 1936. Polar Star was later recovered and donated to the Smithsonian National Air and Space Museum.

== Variants ==
Gamma 2A
First production aircraft, sold to Texaco and flown by Frank Hawks as "Sky Chief", 785 hp (585 kW) Wright radial engine.
Gamma 2B
Two-seat version with tandem controls, flown across Antarctica as the Polar Star, 500 hp (370 kW) Pratt & Whitney Wasp radial engine.
Gamma 2C (YA-13)
Northrop-proposed attack version to compete with Curtiss A-12 Shrike armed with 4x 0.30 cal machine guns in the wings, 1x 0.30 cal machine gun on a flexible mount for rear defence, and up to 1,100 lb (500 kg) of bombs under the wings, evaluated by USAAC in 1933
XA-16
YA-13 prototype redesignated after being fitted with a Pratt & Whitney R-1830-9 engine
Gamma 2D
Cargo version used by TWA, three built, 710 hp (530 kW) Wright Cyclone engine. One aircraft was converted into an "Experimental Overweather Laboratory" studying icing, superchargers, radios, and turbulence at 20,000–35,000 ft (6,100–10,670 m), then used by USAAC under the designation UC-100. Another retired TWA aircraft was used by the Spanish Republican air force for coastal patrol.
Gamma 2E
Similar to Gamma 2C in armament except for a 1,600 lb (727 kg) bomb load, used by the Republic of China Air Force as a light bomber until 1938 with a number of aircraft built under license in China, one, as K5053, used by the British Aeroplane & Armament Experimental Establishment, and two supplied to the Imperial Japanese Navy Air Service, as the Northrop BXN, for evaluation in 1933.

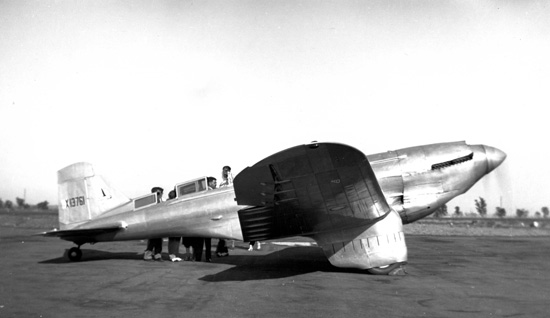
Jacqueline Cochran's Northrop Gamma 2G with Curtiss Conqueror V-12 engine

Gamma 2F
Another attack version developed in parallel with Gamma 2C, entered service as Northrop A-17 .
Gamma 2G
Two-seat race version, originally with a Curtiss Conqueror engine, later changed to Pratt & Whitney Twin Wasp Jr., then to Wright Cyclone SGR-1820-G-5. Flown by Jacqueline Cochran and Howard Hughes.
Gamma 2H
Testbed for Sperry automatic pilot, also flown by Russell Thaw to a third-place finish in the 1935 Bendix Trophy race.
Gamma 2J
Two-seat trainer powered by 600 hp (448 kW) Pratt & Whitney Wasp with retractable undercarriage intended for USAAC. North American BC-1 preferred. Only one built.
Gamma 2L
Used by Bristol for Bristol Hercules engine testing.
Gamma 5A
One aircraft exported to Imperial Japanese Navy (designation BXN1) as a study in modern engineering.
Gamma 5B
Two-seat version with the cockpits moved forward, used by the Spanish Republican air force for coastal patrol.
Gamma 5D
One aircraft exported to Japan with "Army-type" equipment (designation BXN2), studied by Nakajima, then passed to Manchukuo National Airways which used it for aerial reconnaissance over China and USSR.

== Operators ==
=== Military operators ===
China

- Chinese Nationalist Air Force

Empire of Japan

- Imperial Japanese Army Air Service

Spain

- Spanish Republican Air Force – Northrop 2D and 5B Gamma

United States

- United States Army Air Corps

=== Civil operators ===
Manchukuo

- Manchukuo National Airways

United States

- Trans World Airlines

== Specifications (Gamma 2D) ==
Data from McDonnell Douglas Aircraft since 1920

General characteristics

- Crew: One
- Length: 31 ft 2 in (9.50 m)
- Wingspan: 47 ft 9 1/2 in (14.567 m)
- Height: 9 ft 0 in (2.74 m)
- Wing area: 363 sq ft (33.7 m^{2})
- Empty weight: 4,119 lb (1,868 kg)
- Gross weight: 7,350 lb (3,334 kg)
- Powerplant: 1 × Wright R-1820 Cyclone 9-cylinder Radial, 710 hp (530 kW)
- Propellers: 2-bladed

Performance

- Maximum speed: 223 mph (359 km/h, 194 kn) at 6,300 ft (1,900 m)
- Cruise speed: 204 mph (328 km/h, 177 kn)
- Range: 1,970 mi (3,170 km, 1,710 nmi)
- Service ceiling: 23,400 ft (7,100 m)
- Rate of climb: 1,390 ft/min (7.1 m/s)

== Gallery ==
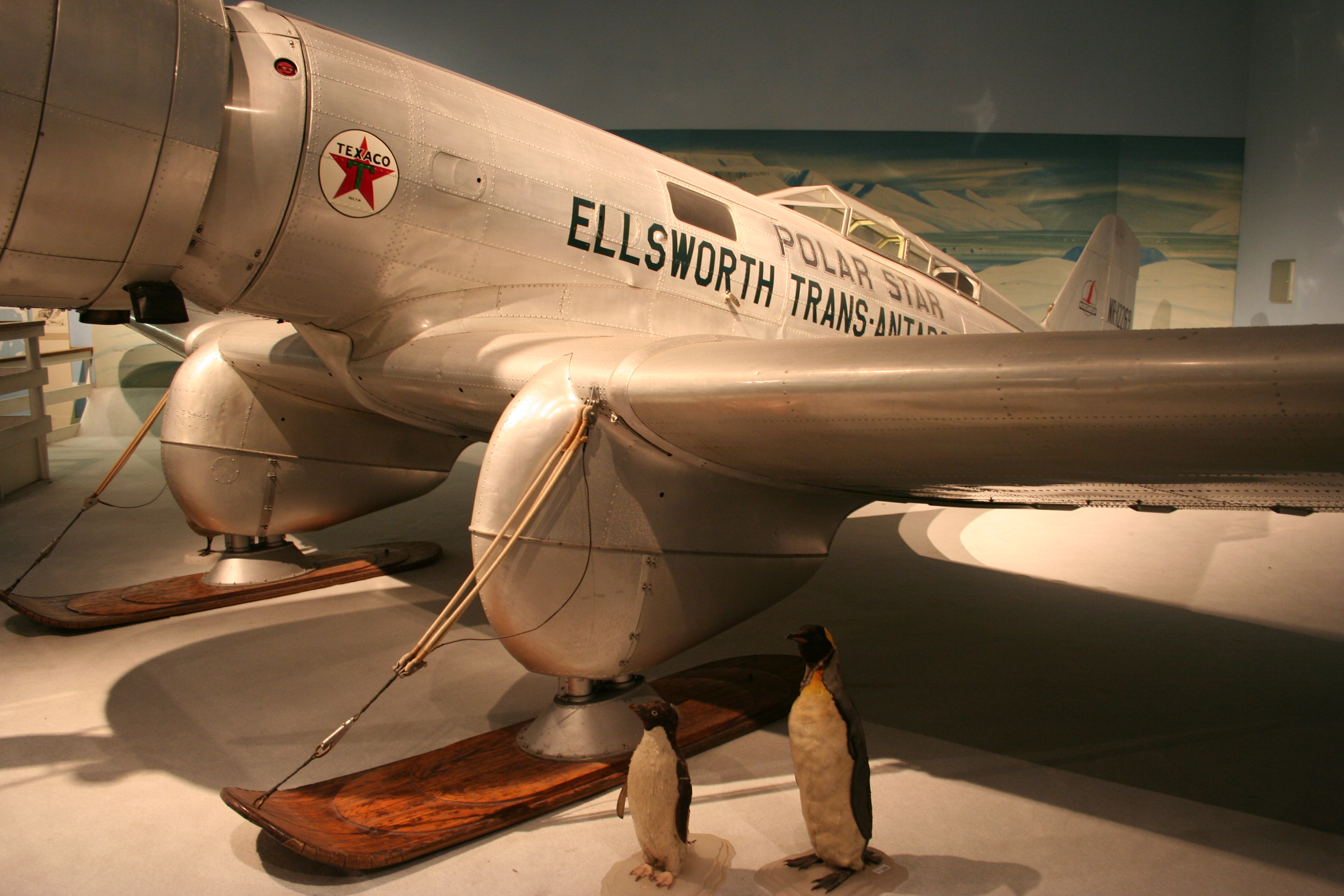
Left side of Gamma with landing gears

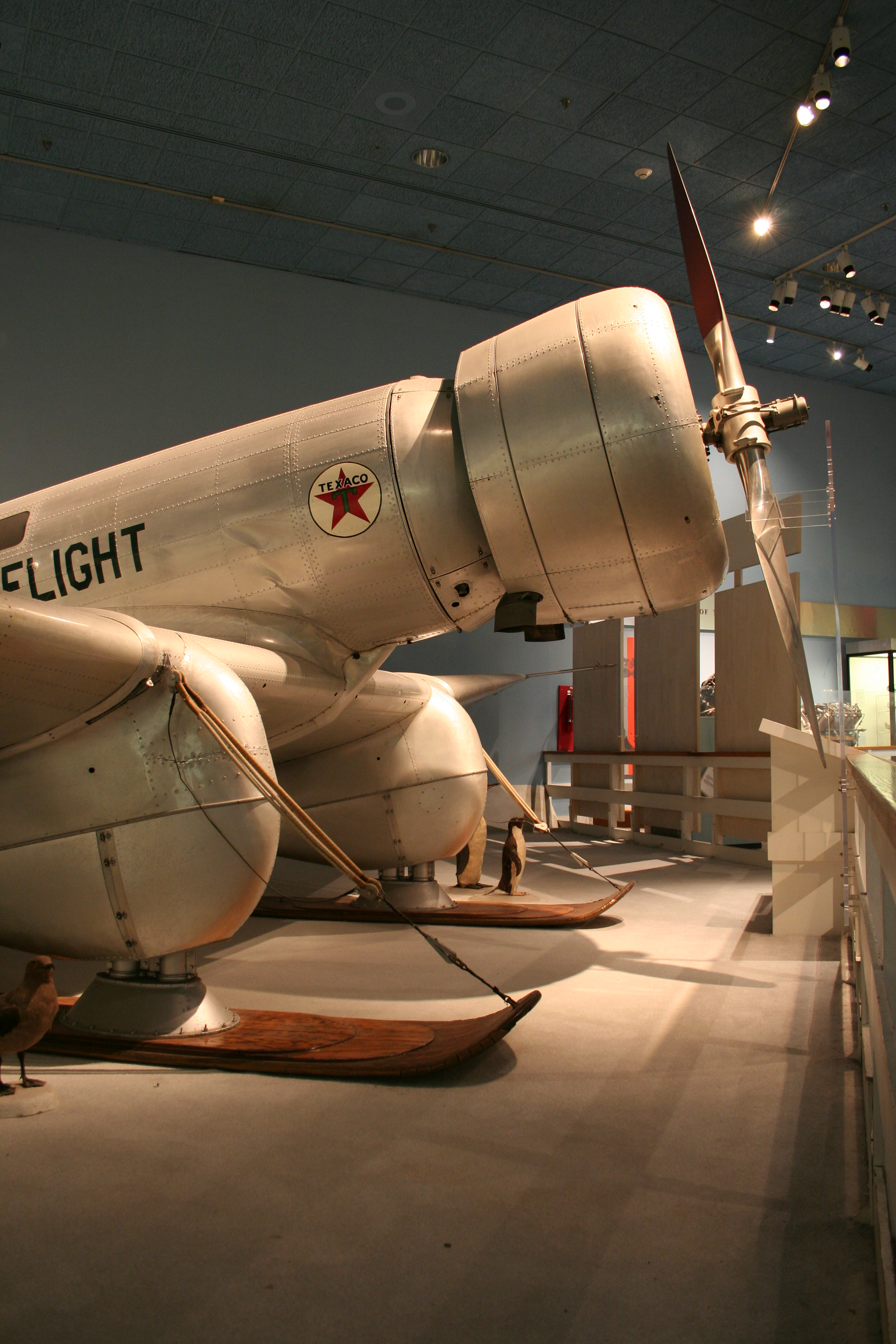
Right front of Gamma

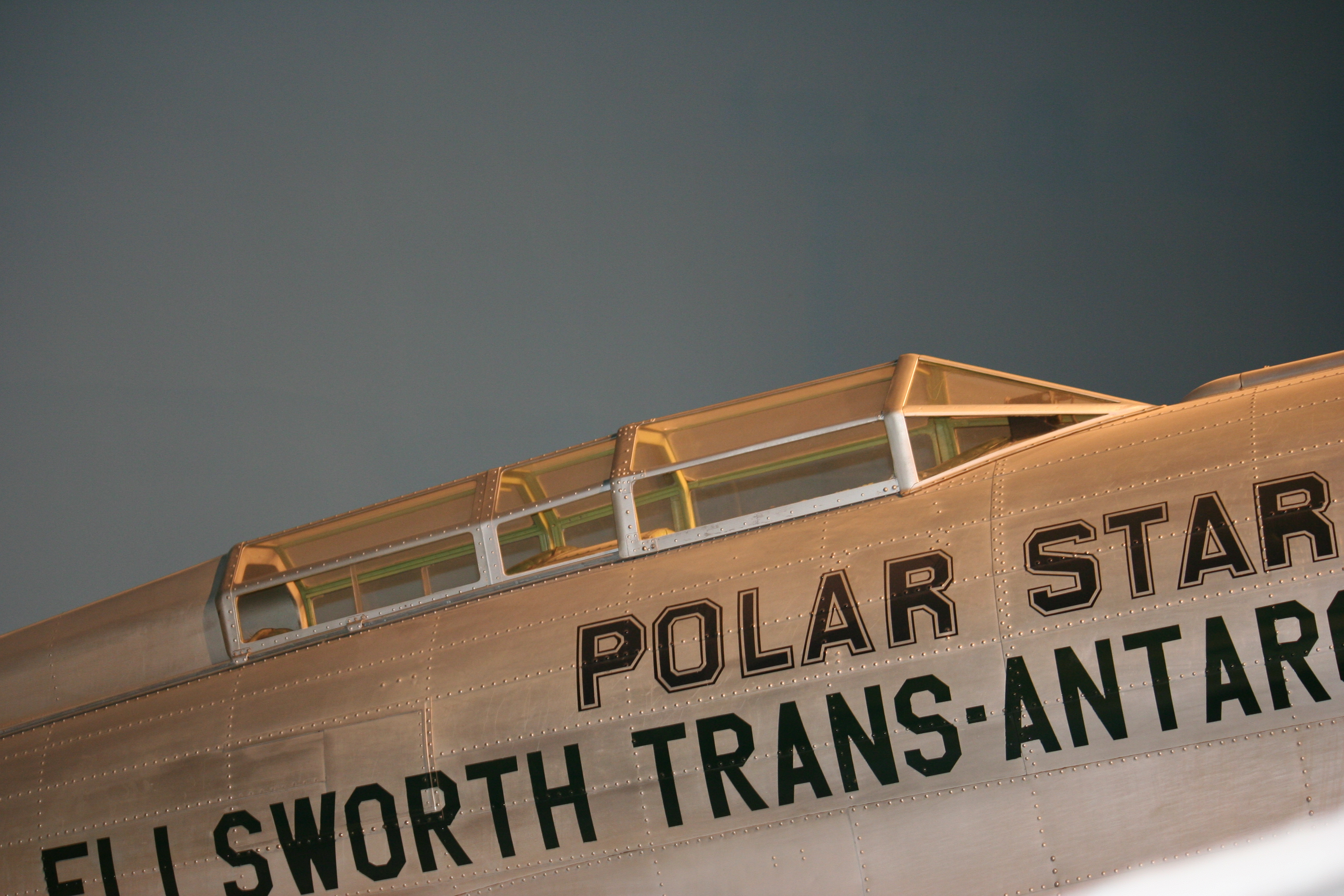
Cockpit of Gamma

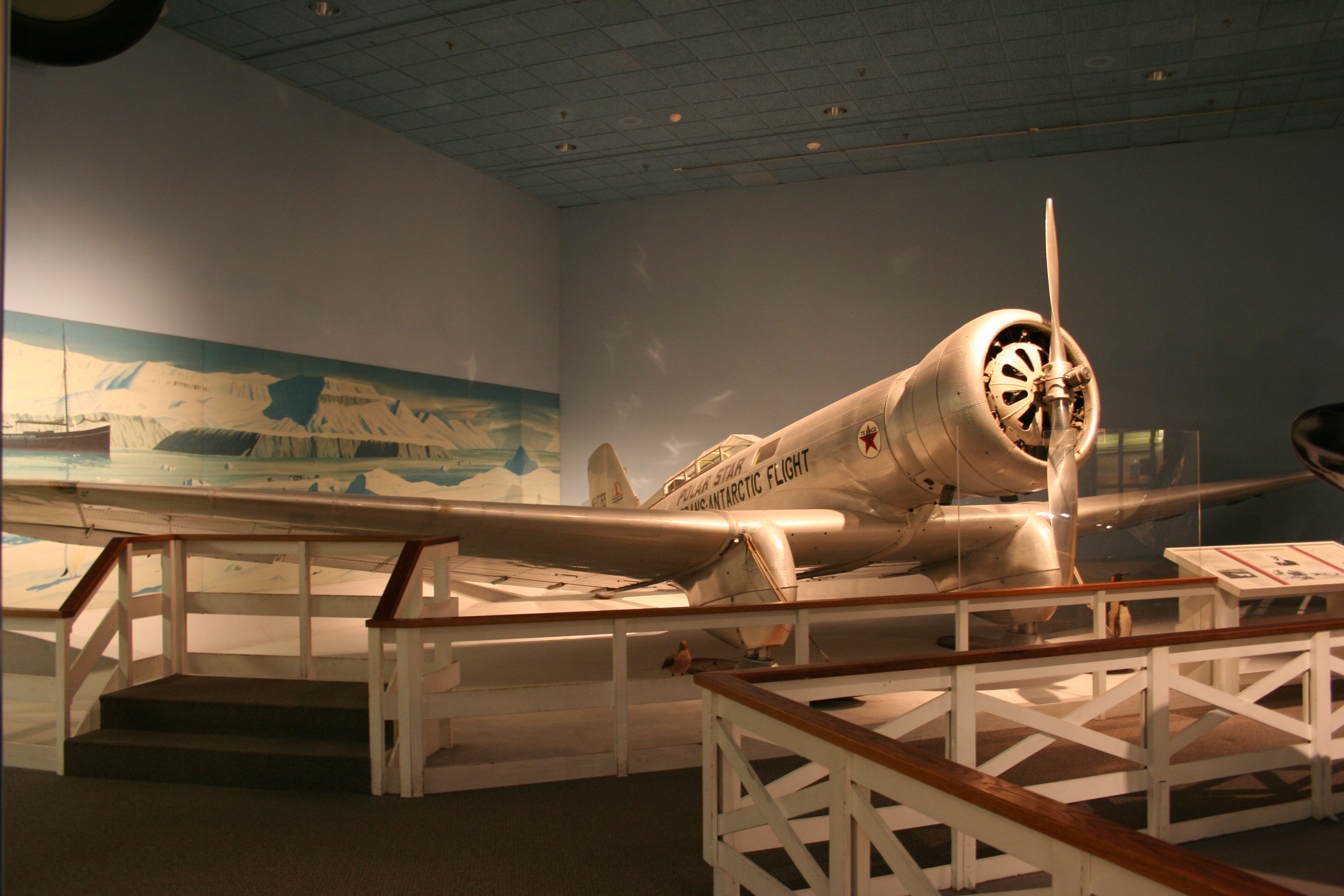
Front end

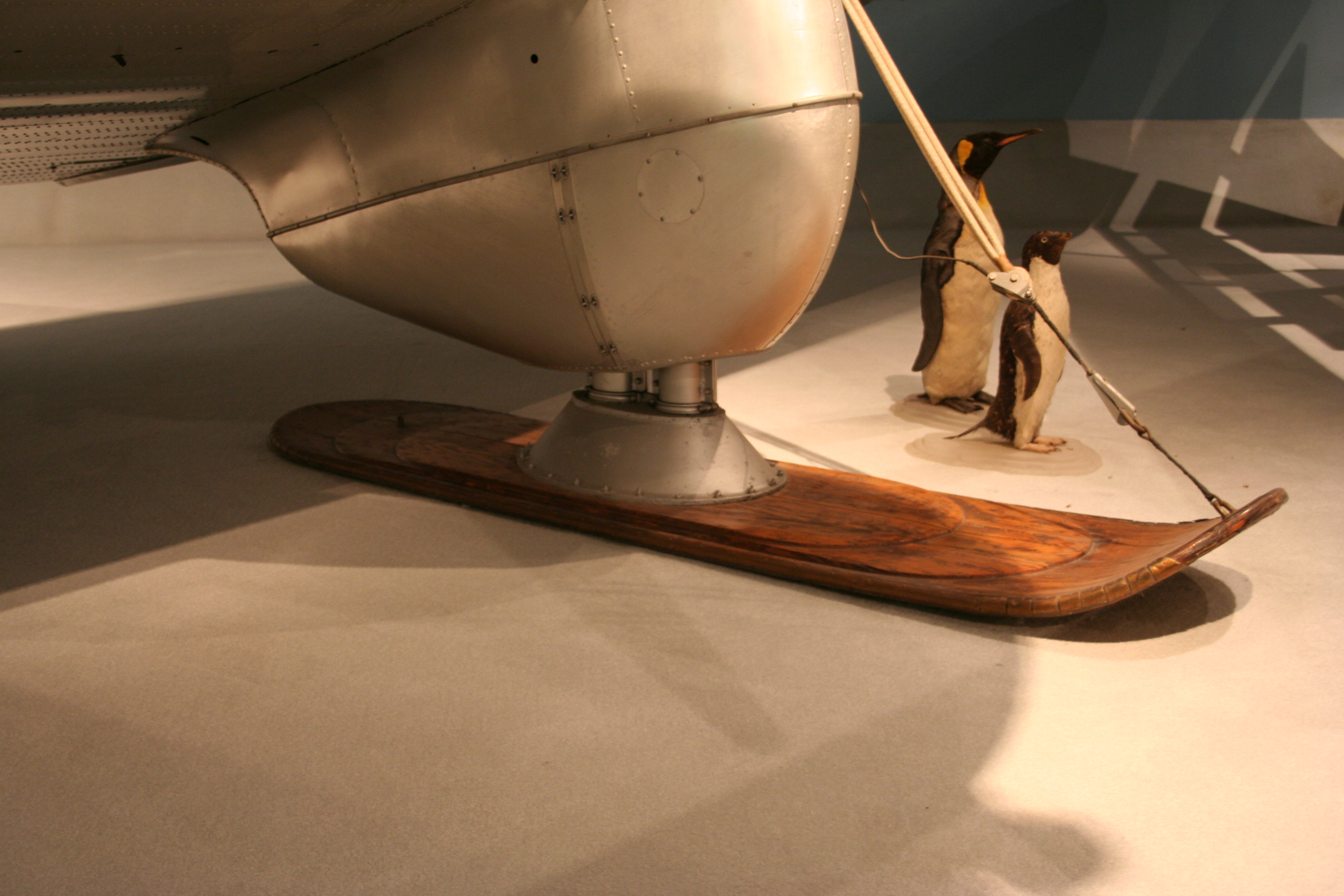
Wooden landing ski

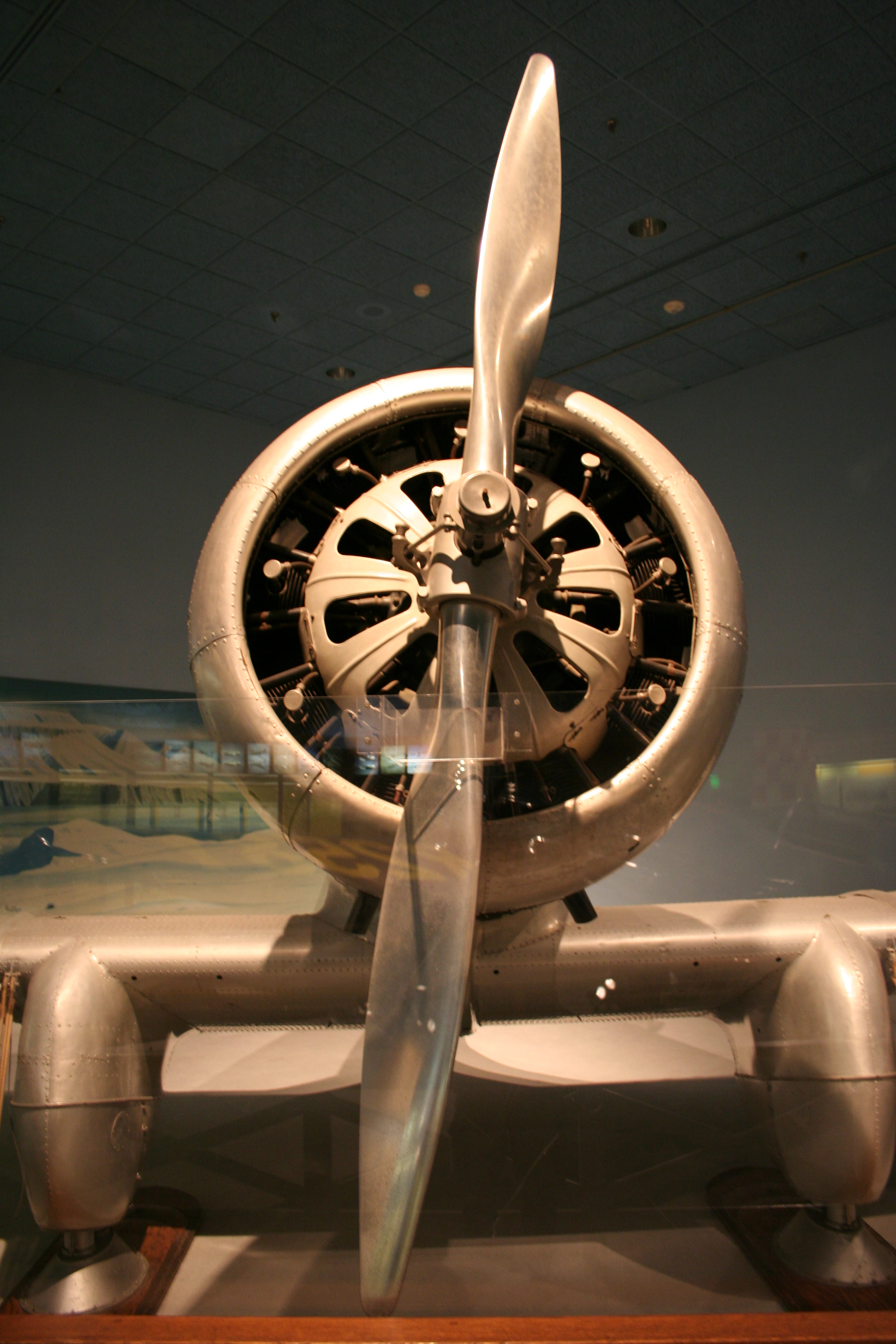
Propeller

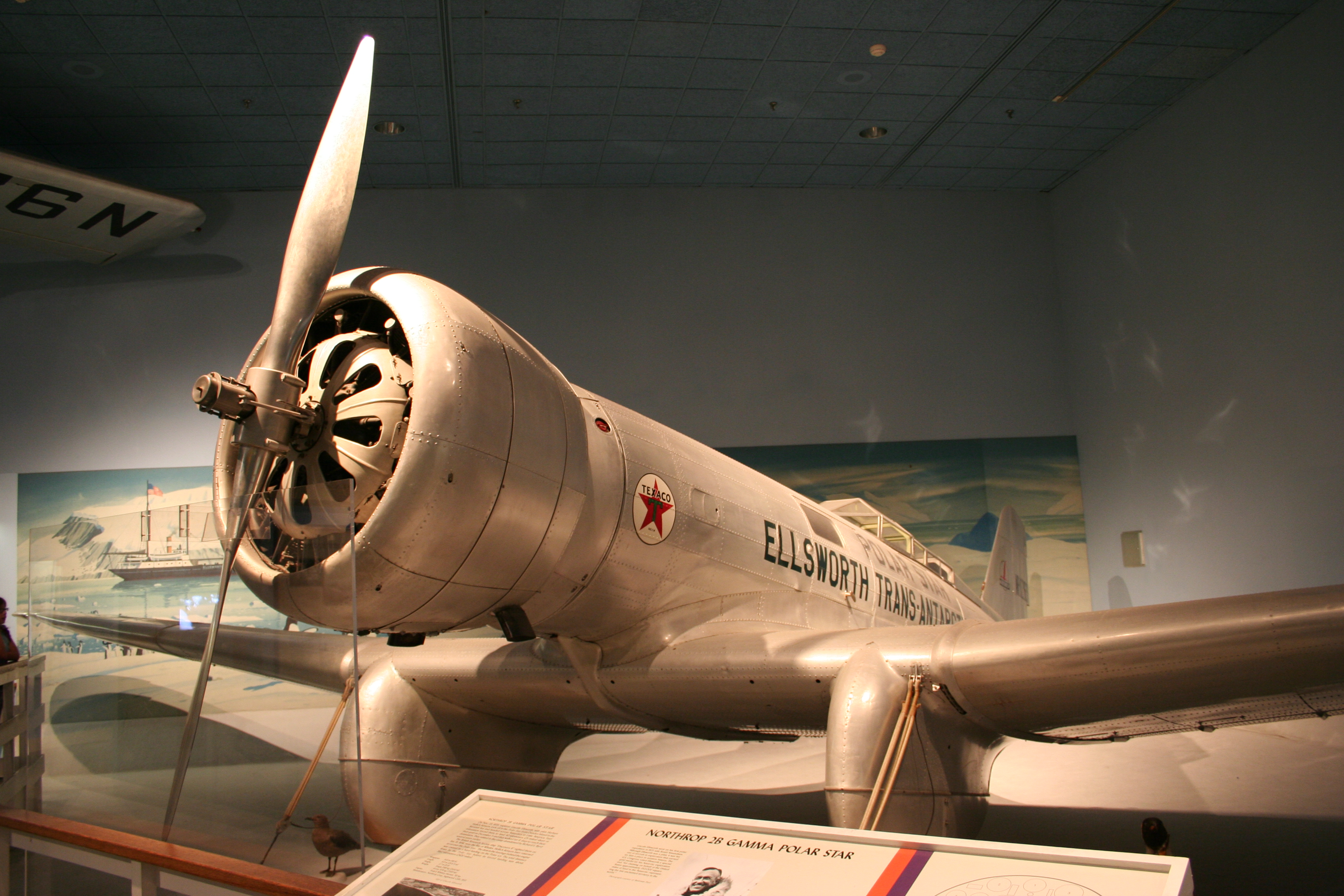
Front left of Gamma

== See also ==
Related development

- Northrop A-17
- Northrop Alpha
- Northrop Beta
- Northrop Delta
- Northrop YA-13

Aircraft of comparable role, configuration, and era

- Curtiss A-12 Shrike
- Lockheed Model 9 Orion
