= Northrop Alpha =

American transport aircraft (1930–1975)

Alpha
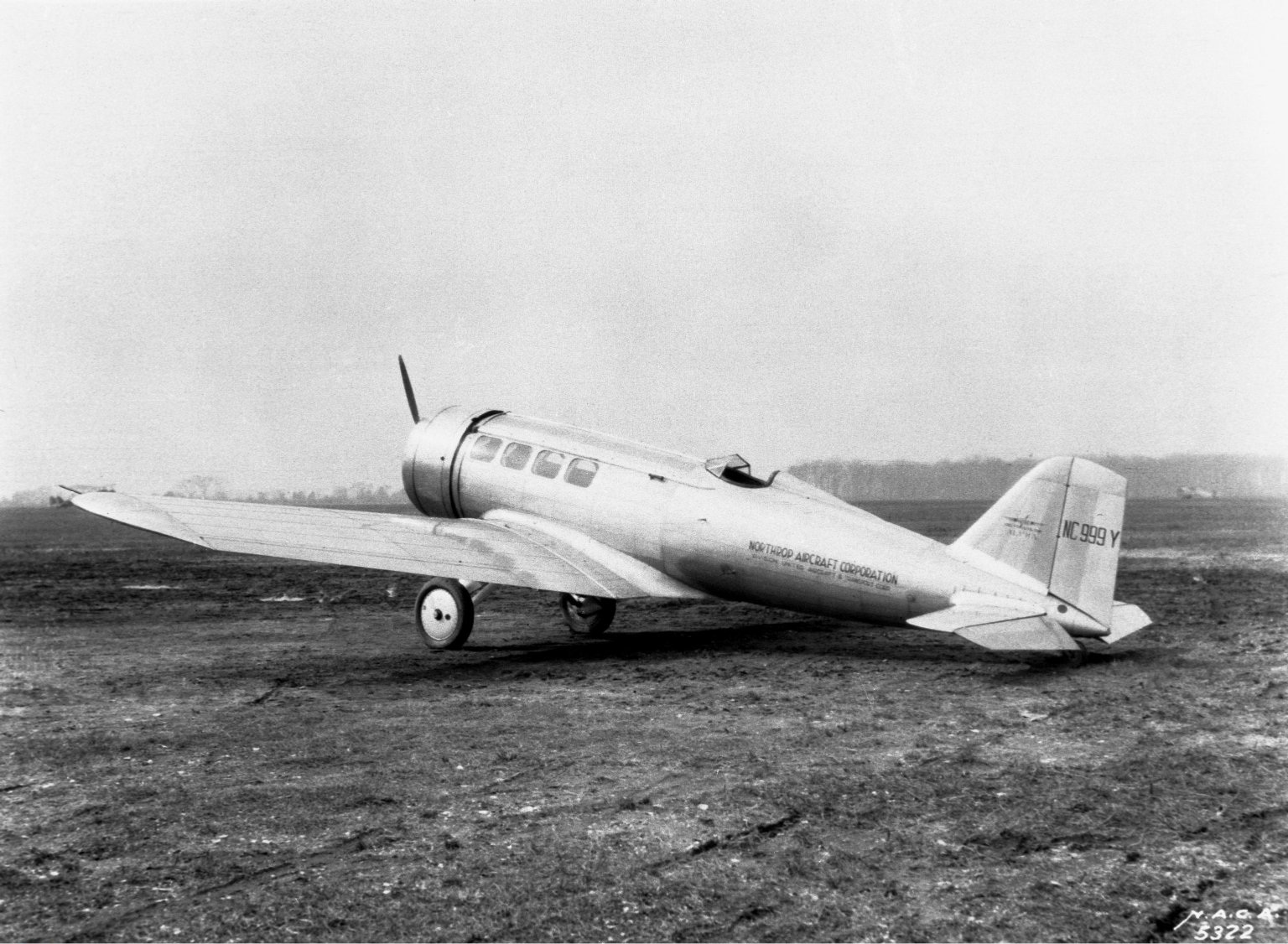
- Northrop Alpha - NASA Photo

General information
- Type: Transport
- Manufacturer: Northrop
- Designer: John K. Northrop
- Primary users: Transcontinental & Western Air US Army Air Corps
- Number built: 17

History
- Introduction date: April 20, 1931
- First flight: 1930
- Retired: 1975 to Smithsonian Institution
- Variants: Northrop Gamma; C-19 Alpha

The Northrop Alpha is an American single-engine, all-metal, seven-seat, low-wing monoplane fast mail/passenger transport aircraft used in the 1930s. Design work was done at the Avion Corporation, which in 1929, became the Northrop Aircraft Corporation based in Burbank, California.

== Design and development ==
Drawing on his experience with the Lockheed Vega, John K. Northrop designed an advanced mail/passenger transport aircraft. In addition to all-metal construction, the new Alpha benefitted from two revolutionary aerodynamic advancements: wing fillets researched at the Guggenheim Aeronautical Laboratory at the California Institute of Technology, and a multicellular stressed-skin wing of Northrop's own design which was later successfully used on the Douglas DC-2 and Douglas DC-3. In addition, the Alpha was the first commercial aircraft to use rubber deicer boots on wing and empennage leading edges which, in conjunction with state-of-the-art radio navigation equipment, gave it day or night, all-weather capability. The aircraft first flew in 1930, with a total of 17 built.

The Alpha was further developed into a dedicated fast transport, the Northrop Gamma.

== Operational history ==
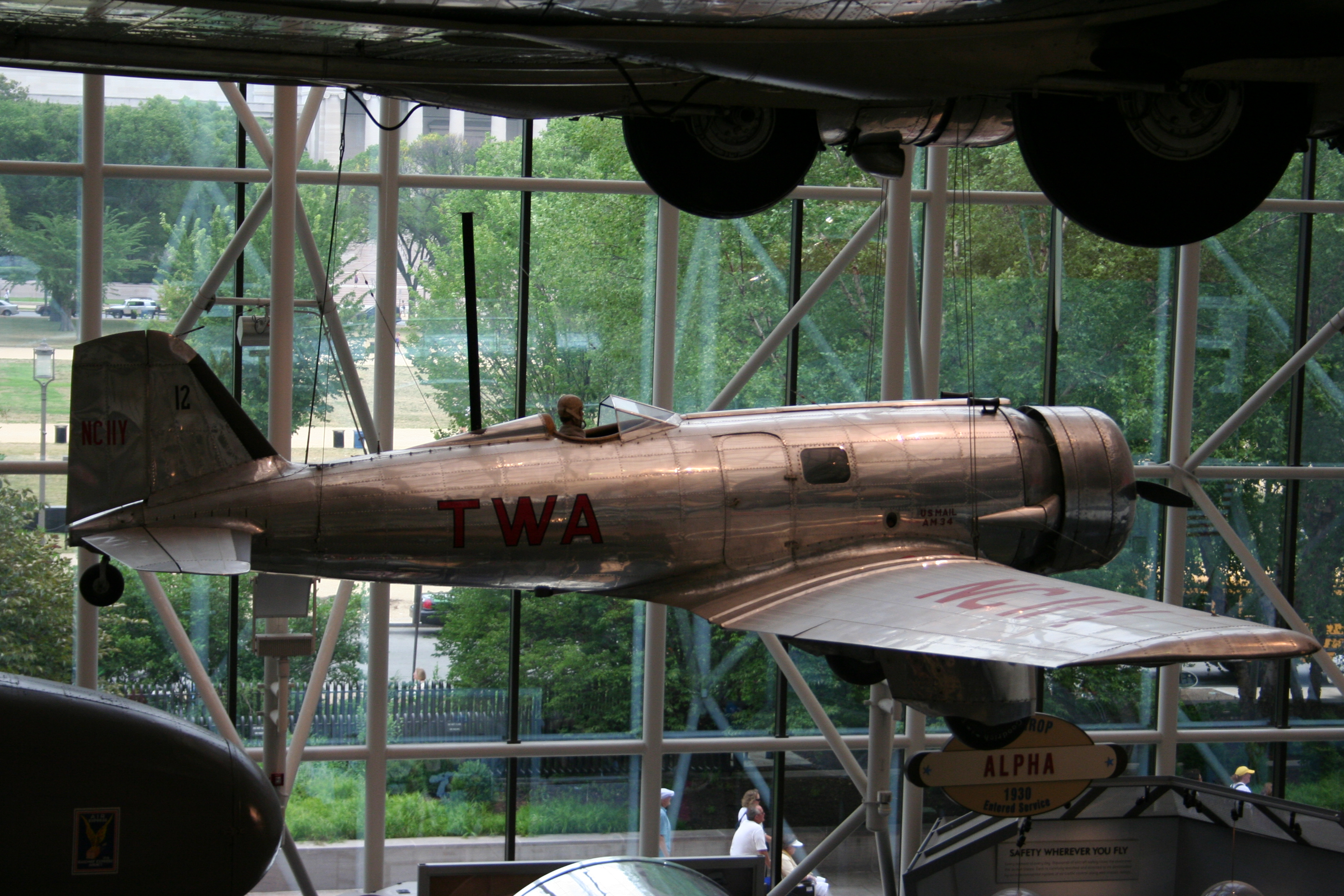
Alpha in TWA colors on display at the National Air and Space Museum

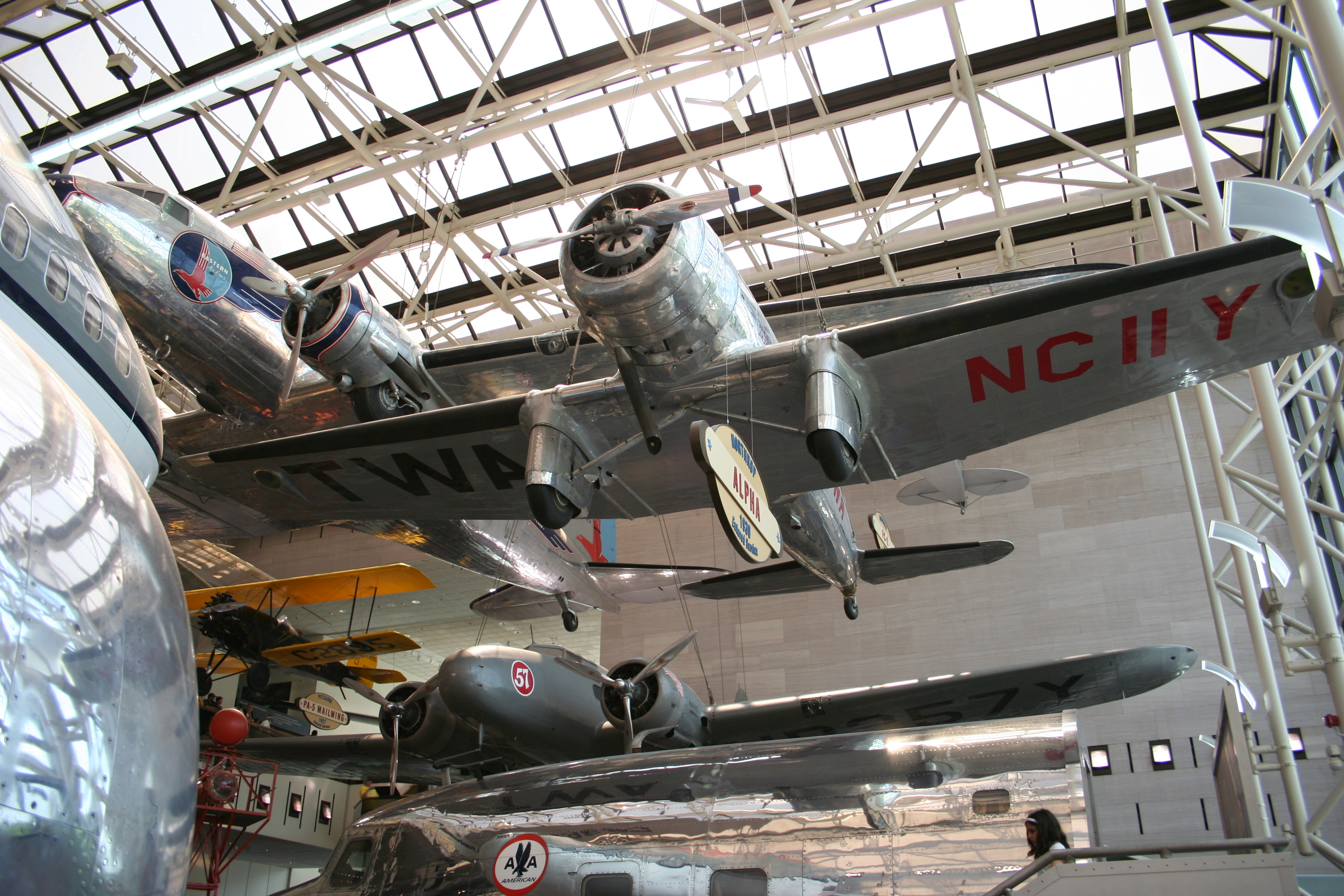
Under the Northrop Alpha

The Alpha entered service with Transcontinental & Western Air (TWA) making its inaugural flight on April 20, 1931. The trip from San Francisco to New York required 13 stops and took just over 23 hours. TWA operated 14 aircraft until 1935, flying routes with stops in San Francisco, California; Winslow, Arizona; Albuquerque, New Mexico; Amarillo, Texas; Wichita, Kansas; Kansas City, Missouri; St. Louis, Missouri; Terre Haute, Indiana; Indianapolis, Indiana; Columbus, Ohio; Pittsburgh, Pennsylvania; Philadelphia, Pennsylvania; and New York. Three Alphas were operated by the US military as C-19 VIP transports until 1939.

TWA's were initially operated as a passenger service but the Alpha's were later modified at the Stearman factory in Wichita into the cargo-carrying 4A model with a new type certificate. Stearman and Northrop had the same parent company at the time.

The third Alpha built, NC11Y, was reacquired by TWA in 1975, and is preserved at the Smithsonian National Air and Space Museum.

The Alpha also entered service in the Chinese Nationalist Air Force and placed in the 8th bomber group but were converted into scout bombers during the Second Sino-Japanese War.

== Variants ==
Alpha 2
Six-passenger version
Alpha 3
Two-passenger plus cargo version, several Alpha 2s were converted to this configuration
Alpha 4
Cargo version with 2 ft (0.6 m) increased wingspan and large metal fairings encapsulating the main gear for drag reduction. All were converted from Alpha 3s
Alpha 4A
Cargo version, all converted from Alpha 4s
YC-19 and Y1C-19
Military VIP transport, seating reduced to four passengers, serial numbers 31–516 to 31-518, YC-19 had a Pratt & Whitney R-1340-7, while the Y1C-19s had the R-1340-11 engine

== Operators ==
United States

- Trans World Airlines
- US Army Air Corps

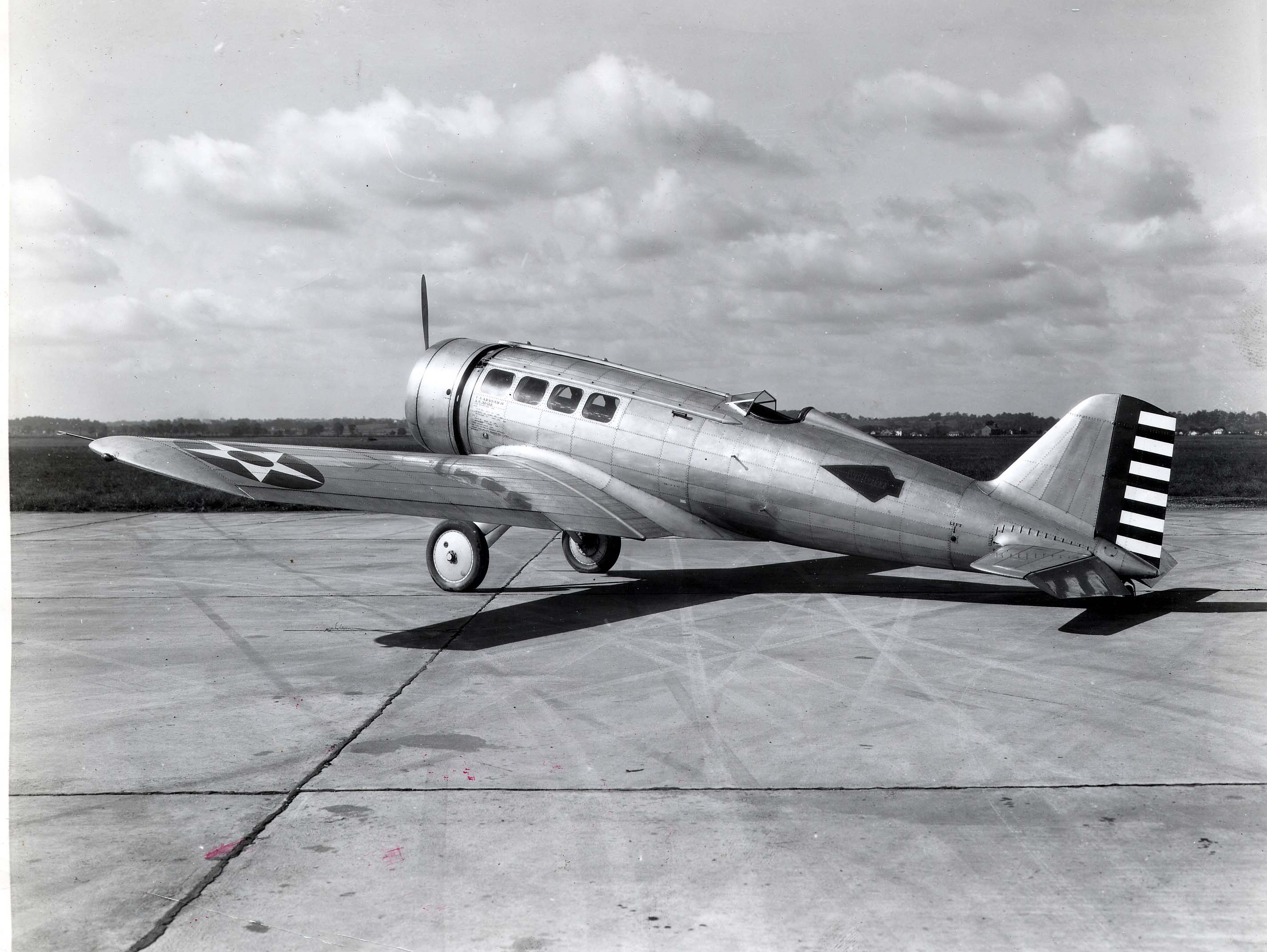
USAAC Northrop Alpha

China

- Chinese Nationalist Air Force operated them into scout bombers.

== Specifications (Alpha 2) ==
General characteristics

- Crew: one
- Capacity: six passengers and 1,910 lb (868 kg) useful load
- Length: 28 ft 5 in (8.7 m)
- Wingspan: 41 ft 10 in (12.8 m)
- Height: 9 ft 0 in (2.7 m)
- Wing area: 295 sq ft (27.4 m^{2})
- Empty weight: 2,590 lb (1,177 kg)
- Gross weight: 4,500 lb (2,045 kg)
- Powerplant: 1 × Pratt & Whitney Wasp R-1340-SC1 , 420 hp (313 kW)

Performance

- Maximum speed: 177 mph (285 km/h, 154 kn)
- Cruise speed: 145 mph (233 km/h, 126 kn)
- Range: 1,650 mi (2,650 km, 1,430 nmi)
- Service ceiling: 19,300 ft (5,885 m)
- Rate of climb: 1,400 ft/min (7.1 m/s)
- Wing loading: 15.3 lb/sq ft (74.6 kg/m^{2})
- Power/mass: 0.09 hp/lb (0.15 kW/kg)

== See also ==
Related development

- Northrop Beta
- Northrop Gamma
- Northrop Delta

Aircraft of comparable role, configuration, and era

- Lockheed Vega
- Boeing Monomail
- Lockheed Model 9 Orion
