= Edward Allen (footballer) =

English footballer

Personal information
- Place of birth: London, England
- Position: Forward

Senior career*
Years	Team	Apps	(Gls)
1920	Southend United	5	(0)
- * Club domestic league appearances and goals

Edward Allen was a footballer who played in The Football League for Southend United. He was born in London, England.
