= Eddie Allen (folk musician) =

American folk musician

- Born: December 20, 1952 (age 73)
- Origin: Wisconsin, United States
- Genres: Folk
- Occupations: Musician, songwriter
- Instruments: Guitar, vocals
- Labels: Weary Wolf/Folked Up

Eddie Allen is an American folk musician. To date, he has produced two albums, The Trempealeau Hotel (1985) and Faith in Gravity (1990), both released by Weary Wolf Records, a division of Folked Up Musics (BMI). His musical style is firmly rooted in the folk tradition of the midwestern United States, and many of his songs describe the trials and tribulations of the lives of people in the working class. Both of his albums are out of print, and he has stated that he has no intention of producing a third.

His first album, The Trempealeau Hotel, was heavily river-themed, focusing on the culture of people who worked on the Mississippi River. The title track refers to a hotel in Trempealeau, Wisconsin, a small village on the border of Wisconsin and Minnesota. It was originally released on LP, although a remastered CD was produced in limited quantities.

His second album, Faith In Gravity, dropped the river theme and contained a number of songs with a fairly poppy feel, most notably the title track. It includes one live track, Longevity Blues, a humorous song about the vices one needs to give up to ensure a long life. As a point of trivia, the in-leaf contains a track listing in Korean hangul, for which Eddie Allen thanks "Marissa's mother", presumably the mother of the Marissa of Marissa's Lullaby, the fourth track on the album.

== Discography ==
All songs are by Eddie Allen unless otherwise noted.

- The Trempealeau Hotel (1985)
1. River of Life
2. The Trempealeau Hotel
3. The Sprague Song
4. Recurring Dream
5. No End Of Love (J. Hartford)
6. Hatful of Diamonds
7. Captain Walter Karnath
8. For You My Love (L. Long)
9. Steamboat Lover
10. Lauren's Little Lullaby (C. Riness)
- Faith In Gravity (1990)
1. Flesh and Bone
2. Last Night When The Cold Wind Blew (R. Schneider)
3. Winter of '77 (J. Miller)
4. Marissa's Lullabye
5. Faith In Gravity
6. All My Songs Are Love Songs
7. Maybe
8. Natural Disaster (L. Wainwright III)
9. Longevity Blues
10. Grandad's Song
11. The Hunter's Prayer
12. Into Light
