= Ed Allen (TV host) =

Canadian television host (1926–2018)

- Born: 14 December 1926; Chicago, Illinois, U.S.
- Died: 29 December 2018 (aged 92); Arlington Heights, Illinois, U.S.
- Occupation: television fitness host
- Known for: The Ed Allen Show

Ed Allen (14 December 1926 – 29 December 2018) was a television host noted for his syndicated exercise programs.

Allen was an actor and singer in the United States during his early career, becoming a television program host in 1948. His program was broadcast on 43 American television stations, resulting in fan mail of 3,000 letters a week. In 1963, television producer Riff Markowitz brought Allen to Canada, recording 65 half-hour episodes of the exercise show in five days. Shortly after his 2 September 1963 debut on CHCH-TV in Hamilton, Ontario, the station received 1,131 letters in a nine-day span, raising expectations of syndication throughout Canada.

195 episodes of The Ed Allen Show were produced by the Canadian production team of Al Guest and Jean Mathieson.

Ed Allen had a following of millions of viewers and fans, from all over the world. His exercise show was still being distributed in the early 1990s. The format was usually set somewhere on a beach; in the late 1960s, the filming location was in Montego Bay, Jamaica at the Half Moon Hotel, specifically the Kennedy Beach House. Barbie, Ed's second wife (m. 1974, née Barbara A. Schilling) was a regular providing various routines and in 1979 developed a chain of classes under the Barbie Allen Dancercise brand. Vinyl LPs and videos were available. Ed wore a distinctive one-piece polyester jumpsuit while he did his calisthenics. In the late 1960s, he earned an estimated annual income of at least US$100,000.

Allen hosted Stay Tuned, a 1978–79 weekday talk show on Global Television Network.

== Bibliography ==
- 1976: The Ed Allen Exercise Book (Coles)
