= Hikōtai Transport Unit =

The Japanese Army Air Force Hikōtai Unit was an Imperial Japanese Army Air Service Air transport section (a Hikōtai) whose mission was to transport personnel, weapons and equipment to occupied territories or the combat front in wartime. Such units supported Army airborne forces during their missions as well.

== Fleet ==
These service operated various types of aircraft:

- Kawasaki Ki-3 (Liaison and communications)
- Nakajima Ki-4 (Liaison and communications)
- Kokusai Ki-76 "Stella" (Liaison)
- Kobeseiko Te-Gō (Liaison)
- Mansyu Ki-97 (Communications)
- Mitsubishi Ki-7 (Liaison)
- Mitsubishi Ki-46 "Dinah" (Liaison, communication and courier)
- Tachikawa (Ishikawajima) Light Ambulance (Air Ambulance/liaison)
- Tachikawa Ki-9 "Spruce" (Communications)
- Tachikawa Ki-17 "Cedar" (Communications)
- Kayaba Ka-1 (communications helicopter)
- Kawasaki Ki-56 "Thalia" (Merchant transport)
- Kokusai Ki-59 "Theresa" (Light transport)
- Mitsubishi Ki-1 (Heavy Bomber/Transport)
- Mitsubishi Ki-7 (Light transport)
- Mitsubishi Ki-21 "Sally" (Heavy Bomber/transport)
- Mitsubishi MC-20 (Transport version of Ki-21 bomber)
- Mitsubishi Ki-57 "Topsy" (Personnel transport)
- Nakajima Ki-34 "Thora" (Personnel transport)
- Nakajima Ki-6 (Light transport, version of Fokker 8 Super Universal)
- Nakajima Ki-49 (Transport modification of Ki-49 bomber)
- Douglas DC-2 (Transport, 2 purchased, 6 manufactured under license)
- Douglas DC-5 (Transport, 1 captured at KLM, evaluated and used for transport services)
- Tachikawa Type LO Transport Aircraft "Thelma" (Personnel transport)
- Tachikawa Ki-54 "Hickory" (Light transport)
- Kokusai Ku-8 "Gander" (Transport glider)

== Manchoukuoan Air Transport Services ==
Within this unit in Manchukuo the Manchukuo Air Transport Company developed. This unit functioned as a paramilitary transport service inside of Manchukuo Air Force for the transportation of Japanese and Manchu military personnel. They were equipped with Junkers Ju 86 Z-2, among other airplanes.
