= Nakajima D3N =

Japanese dive bomber prototype

D3N

General information
- Type: Dive bomber
- National origin: Japan
- Manufacturer: Nakajima Aircraft Company
- Number built: 3

History
- First flight: 1937

The Nakajima D3N (also designated Experimental 11-Shi Carrier Bomber and Nakajima DB) was a Japanese carrier-based dive bomber of the 1930s. Three prototypes were built for the Imperial Japanese Navy, but no production followed, with the Aichi D3A being selected instead.

== Design and development ==
In 1936, the Imperial Japanese Navy Air Service issued a specification for a carrier based dive bomber to replace the Aichi D1A, a two-seat biplane developed from the German Heinkel He 66. The new dive bomber was to be a low-wing monoplane, with proposals submitted by Aichi, Mitsubishi and Nakajima. Orders were placed with Aichi and Nakajima for prototypes in 1934. Nakajima's design was based on its C3N and B5N that had been designed to meet 1935 requirements for a reconnaissance aircraft and torpedo bomber respectively, and like these aircraft, was a single-engined monoplane of all-metal construction with folding wings for storage aboard ship. It was powered by a single Nakajima Hikari nine-cylinder radial engine, rated at 660–820 horsepower (490–610 kW), and driving a two-bladed variable-pitch propeller. It had a retractable tailwheel undercarriage, in which the mainwheels were designed to be lowered for use as dive brakes, although more conventional dive brakes were added as a result of a change in the specification.

The first prototype made its maiden flight in 1937, with the second and third prototypes flying in 1939. Aichi's AM-17 proved superior however, and was ordered into production as the Aichi D3A in December 1939.

The second prototype was retained by Nakajima and used as a testbed, helping in the development of the Nakajima Sakae and Homare engines, and remaining in use until 1945.

== Specifications ==
Data from Japanese Aircraft 1910–1941

General characteristics

- Crew: two
- Length: 8.80 m (28 ft 10 in)
- Wingspan: 14.50 m (47 ft 7 in)
- Height: 2.80 m (9 ft 2 in) (tail down)
- Wing area: 34 m^{2} (370 sq ft)
- Empty weight: 1,800 kg (3,968 lb)
- Gross weight: 3,400 kg (7,496 lb)
- Powerplant: 1 × Nakajima Hikari 1-kai air-cooled radial engine, 610 kW (820 hp)

Performance

- Maximum speed: 350 km/h (220 mph, 190 kn) at 3,000 m (9,800 ft)
- Cruise speed: 140 km/h (87 mph, 76 kn)
- Range: 1,520 km (940 mi, 820 nmi)
- Endurance: 6 hours
- Service ceiling: 7,000 m (23,000 ft)
- Time to altitude: 8 minutes to 3,000 m (9,800 ft)

Armament

- Guns: 2 × fixed forward firing 7.7 mm machine guns and 1 × flexibly mounted 7.7 mm gun in rear cockpit
- Bombs: 1 × 250 kg (550 lb) and 2 × 30 kg (66 lb) bombs

== See also ==
Aircraft of comparable role, configuration, and era

- Aichi D3A
