= Nakajima P-1 =

General information
- Type: mailplane
- National origin: Japan
- Manufacturer: Nakajima Aircraft Company
- Number built: 9

History
- First flight: early summer 1933

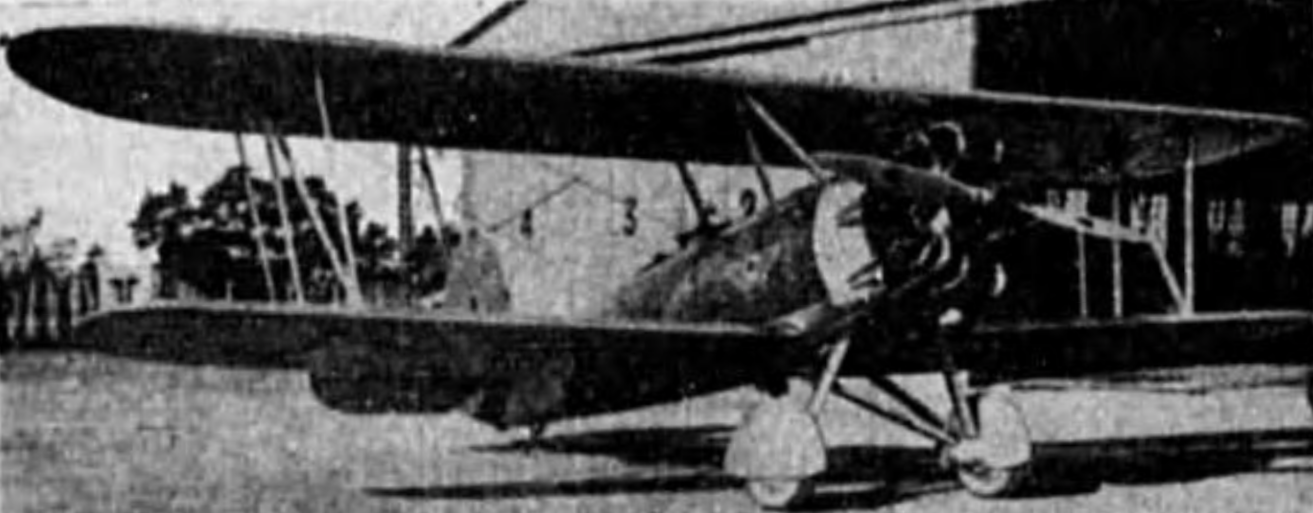
Nakajima P-1.

The Nakajima P-1 was a 1930s Japanese single engine, single seat biplane intended for night mail flights, derived from the Nakajima E4N3 Naval reconnaissance seaplane. Nine were built.

== Design and development ==
In January 1933 Nakajima won a contract for eight mailplanes from Nihon Koku Yuso to fly a new night mail service. Their design, the Nakajima P-1, was based on that of the Nakajima E4N3 (Navy Type 90-2-3), a reconnaissance seaplane. The P-1 was a single seat, landplane biplane of mixed wood and metal structure with fabric covering.

It had two spar, single bay wings with N-form interplane struts between the spars aided by wire-bracing. The central upper wing was joined to the fuselage with outward-leaning cabane struts, inverted Vs to the forward spar and single struts to the rear. The lower wing, slightly shorter in span, was joined directly to the lowest fuselage longerons.

The P-1 was powered by a nose-mounted 420–450 hp (310–340 kW) Nakajima Jupiter VI nine cylinder radial engine though some were later re-engined with the 585 hp (436 kW) Nakajima Kotobuki 2-kai-1, a related nine cylinder radial which had powered the Nakajima E4N3. Both had narrow-chord Townend cowlings. Its cockpit, initially open but enclosed on later aircraft with glazing running aft into a turtle back fairing, placed the pilot well behind the wings. Night flight safety was increased by two landing lights under mid-span and parachute flares. It also had a radio receiver and a radio beacon.

The fuselage was circular immediately behind the large radial engine but became more flat-sided rearwards. The tail was conventional with the tailplane mounted on top of the fuselage carrying elevators with rounded tips and cut-outs for rudder movement. The vertical tail was also rounded, with a full rudder that reached down to the keel.

The P-1 had fixed landing gear with wheels on divided axles, their centres hinged on a short, under-fuselage V-strut pylon. Splayed landing struts and rearward drag struts were mounted on the lower fuselage longerons. The wheels were largely enclosed under narrow helmet fairings.

== Operational history ==
The first of Nihon Koku Yuso's eight aircraft was completed in May 1933. The standard night mail route connected Tokyo, Osaka and Fukuoka and began operations in August 1933. Though this service was successful in the sense of increasing mail volume it showed that these night flights were stressful for a single pilot in a single-engined aircraft, especially in bad weather. As a result, the P-1s were gradually retired over two pioneering years, replaced by larger, twin-engined aircraft with a larger crew.

A ninth, specially built, P-1 was used by the Ministry of Communications.

== Specifications ==
Data from Japanese Aircraft 1910-1941

General characteristics

- Crew: one
- Length: 7.66 m (25 ft 2 in)
- Wingspan: 10.97 m (36 ft 0 in)
- Height: 3.70 m (12 ft 2 in)
- Wing area: 32.57 m^{2} (350.6 sq ft)
- Airfoil: N-22 upper wing, Clark Y lower
- Empty weight: 1,225 kg (2,701 lb)
- Gross weight: 1,992 kg (4,392 lb)
- Powerplant: 1 × Nakajima Jupiter VI 9 cylinder radial
- Propellers: Hamilton Standard fixed pitch metal

Performance

- Maximum speed: 243 km/h (151 mph, 131 kn)
- Cruise speed: 194 km/h (121 mph, 105 kn)
- Range: 1,000 km (620 mi, 540 nmi)
- Time to altitude: 9 m 27 s to 3,000 m (9,800 ft)
