= Nakajima Ha5 =

1930s Japanese piston aircraft engine

Ha5
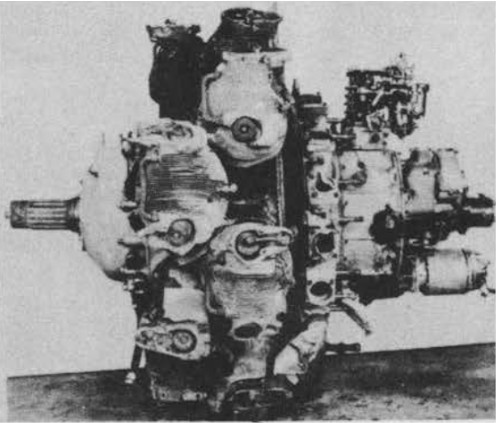
- Nakajima Ha109, improved variant of the Ha5 with a 2-speed supercharger.
- Type: 14-cylinder, air-cooled, two-row radial piston engine
- National origin: Japan
- Manufacturer: Nakajima Aircraft Company
- Major applications: Mitsubishi Ki-21; Mitsubishi Ki-30; Mitsubishi Ki-57; Nakajima Ki-49 (Ha-41/Ha-109); Nakajima Ki-44 (Ha-41/Ha109)
- Developed from: Nakajima Hikari
- Developed into: Nakajima Ha219

The Nakajima Ha5 is a twin row, 14-cylinder air-cooled radial aircraft engine built by the Japanese Nakajima Aircraft Company. The engine was a development of earlier single-row Japanese engines, the Kotobuki and Hikari, which had combined features of the Bristol Jupiter and Pratt & Whitney R-1340 Wasp designs.

First introduced in a 1,000 PS prototype in 1933, about 7,000 civilian and 5,500 military Ha-5's were built during World War II. The Ha-5 had separate cam-discs for the front and rear rows of cylinders like American designs, rather than using a single, front-mounted cam-disc with long and short pushrods to operate both rows of cylinder valves.

The Ha-5 was a twin-row development of the Nakajima Hikari, which was itself a development of the Nakajima Kotobuki. It spawned several improved variants, namely the Ha-41, with a single stage supercharger, and the Ha-109, which featured a two-speed, single stage supercharger. The later Ha-219 was based on the same cylinder design, but was increased in size to 18 cylinders.

== Design and development ==
In 1917, Chikuhei Nakajima set up the "Airplane Institute" at Ojima Town in Gunma Prefecture. In 1918 they built their first airplane; the "Nakajima Type 1" with a U.S.A. made engine. In 1920 the company sent Kimihei Nakajima to France to study European advances, and in 1922 started their own engine factory in Tokyo. This led to production of engines based on the Lawrance A-3 two-cylinder air-cooled horizontally opposed engine.

At the time the Lawrance was an oddity. Most air-cooled engines at that time were rotary engines, using cylinders that rotated together with the propeller with a fixed crankshaft, in order to improve cooling but Kimihei overheard that an engine with good cooling capability with stationary cylinders was being developed in England: a radial engine. He observed the English Gloster Gamecock fighter with its Bristol Jupiter engine, which was an advanced design for the era with an automatic adjustment device for tappet clearance, spiral intake piping for even charge air distribution, and a four-valve intake and exhaust system. He acquired a manufacturing license for the Jupiter in 1925. In 1927, after inviting two production engineer instructors from the Bristol company, the Jupiter Type 6 of 420 PS and Type 7 of 450 PS with a supercharger were put into production at the Nakajima factory.

After studying the Pratt & Whitney Wasp 9-cylinder radial, Nakajima tried to combine the good points found in Jupiter design with the rational design of the Wasp. Nakajima then produced a series of engine types, named "AA", "AB", "AC", and "AD", as engineering exercises. The next engine design, the "AE", was innovative, with a bore of 160 mm and a stroke of 170 mm.

Prototypes were made and performance tests were done, but this engine was not adopted due to its very complex engineering. Nakajima continued testing different cylinder designs. In 1929, the "AH" design, with bore and stroke of 146 × 160 mm and a total displacement of 24.1 L, was completed. This was to be the final version of this basic engine design.

In June 1930 the first prototype of was completed and it passed the durability test for the type approval in the summer. Then flight tests were started using a Nakajima A2N carrier plane. Nakajima had successfully designed the first original Japanese air-cooled 9-cylinder engine, the 450 PS "Kotobuki", which would over time be developed into the Ha-5 and its successors. In December 1931, this engine was approved and adopted by the Navy for the Navy Type 96 Carrier fighter. The engine was named, in connection with the Jupiter engine, "Kotobuki".

The "Kotobuki" engine was improved and developed into the "Hikari (light)" engine with the bore and stroke expanded to the limit of the cylinder (160 × 180 mm for a displacement of 32.6 L), with the power was increased to 720 PS. The "Hikari" was used in Type 95 carrier fighters and Type 96 Carrier Attack Plane.

Nakajima knew that engines of higher power would be needed and began work on the Ha-5, a new 14-cylinder, twin-row design that was based on the 160 × 180 mm cylinder of the Hikari. The Ha-5 prototype engine was completed in 1933, producing 1,000 PS. An improved Ha-5 was developed as a 1,500 PS engine. In all about 5,500 Ha-5 engines were produced for the military.

Later on, as the weights of aircraft rose and higher speeds were required, Nakajima continued to improve the Ha-5 design, creating the "Ha-41" and "Ha-109", which shared the same 146mm x 160mm bore and stroke as the Ha-5, but were increased from the 950 hp of the Ha5 to 1,260 hp and 1,440 hp, respectively. The unified code for the Ha-41 was "Ha-34". Later the engine was developed into an 18-cylinder, twin-row engine called the "Ha-219", but this never got into mass development phase before the war ended a total of 10 were built. All these engines used essentially the same cylinder heads, the differences being in supercharging systems and maximum engine revolutions per minute.

The Ha-5 and Ha-41 shared the same weight of 630 kg, while the Ha-109 weighed 720 kg due to its larger, twin-stage supercharger system. The Ha-41 was the primary engine of early variants of the Nakajima Ki-49 "Helen" bomber, and the Nakajima Ki-44 "Tojo" fighter, later versions of both planes using the more powerful Ha-109 engine. Early versions of the Mitsubishi Ki-21 "Sally" used the Ha-5. The Ha-41 would have been an ideal power plant in aircraft that used the Mitsubishi Kasei, being of smaller dimensions and displacement, yet making equivalent power levels. Nine of the Ha-219 engines where issued to the Kitai Squadron to use for the new Ki-84N. According to two surviving IJAAF mechanics in 1987, the Ki-84N had a recorded speed of 448–450 mph at a ceiling of 42,254 ft when using war emergency power. The engine required much maintenance to keep running, and it overheated when flying at low speeds.

== Variants ==
Ha5
634 kW (850 hp), Base design, (used on Mitsubishi Ki-21 Army Type 97 Heavy Bomber)
Ha5-KAI
634 kW (850 hp), (used on Mitsubishi Ki-30)
Ha5
660 kW (890 hp) (used on Nakajima Ki-19)
Ha5-KAI
708 kW (950 hp), (used on Mitsubishi Ki-57 and Ki-57-I Army Type 100 Transport Model 1)
Ha5-KAI
708 kW (950 hp) take-off, 805 kW (960 hp) at 3,000 m (11,810 ft), (used on Mitsubishi Ki-30 and on first prototype Nakajima Ki-49 Donryu)
Ha5-KAI
708 kW (950 hp) take-off, 805 kW (1,080 hp) at 4,000 m (13,125 ft), (used on Mitsubishi Ki-21-I Army Type 97 Heavy Bomber Model 1 and Ki-21-Ia, Army Type 97 Heavy Bomber Model 1A)
Ha41
1,260 hp at 2,500rpm takeoff, 1,260 hp at 2,450 rpm at 3,700 m
Ha109
1,500 hp at 2,650rpm takeoff, 1,440 hp at 2,600 rpm at 5,200 m
Ha219
1,895 kW (2,541 hp) ( 10 built used on Tachikawa Ki-94-2, Ki-87 and Ki-84-N late war prototypes most destroyed after war with documents.

== Applications ==
The Ha5 engine was used to power:

- Mitsubishi Ki-21 "Sally"
- Mitsubishi Ki-30
- Mitsubishi Ki-57

The Ha41 engine was used to power:

- Nakajima Ki-49-I Donryu ("Helen")
- Nakajima Ki-44-I Shoki ("Tojo")

The Ha109 engine was used to power:

- Nakajima Ki-49-II
- Nakajima Ki-44-II

== Specifications (Nakajima Ha-5) ==
Data from Engine development at Nakajima 1923–1945, Engine History of Nakajima Aircraft.

=== General characteristics ===
- Type: 14-cylinder, air-cooled, two-row radial piston engine
- Bore: 146 mm (5.75 in)
- Stroke: 160 mm (6.3 in)
- Displacement: 37.5 L (2,288 in^{3})
- Diameter: 1,260 mm (49.6 in)
- Dry weight: 625kg (1,378 lb) (720kg Ha109)

=== Components ===
- Valvetrain: four-valve intake and exhaust pushrod-operated overhead valve system
- Supercharger: Centrifugal, 280mm impeller at 8.39:1 reduction (Ha-5 and Ha-41), 6.55:1 and 8.55:1 for Ha-109 (twin stage supercharger)
- Cooling system: Air-cooled
- Reduction gear: 0.6875:1 (11/16)

=== Performance ===
- Power output:
- 890hp (663.7 kW) at 2,200 rpm at 4700m (15,490 ft) with -50mm boost (Nominal Power)
- 950hp (708.4 kW) at 2,200 rpm with +50mm boost (Takeoff Power)
- Specific power: ( to ) 0.58 hp/in^{3} to 1.02 hp/in^{3}
- Compression ratio: 6.7:1

== See also ==
Related development

- Alfa Romeo 125
- Bristol Mercury
- Bristol Pegasus
- Nakajima Kotobuki
- Nakajima Ha219
- Siemens-Halske Sh 22

Comparable engines

- Wright R-2600 Cyclone 14 / Twin Cyclone
- Gnome-Rhône 14N
- Pratt & Whitney R-1830 Twin Wasp
- Bristol Hercules

Related lists

- List of aircraft engines
