= LB2 =

LB2 or LB-2 may refer to:

- the second individual Homo floresiensis skeleton
- Lego Batman 2: DC Super Heroes, a 2012 Lego-themed action-adventure videogame
- Nakajima LB-2, a long-range, land-based bomber developed in Japan for use by the Imperial Japanese Navy
