= TK-3 =

TK-3 may refer to:

- TK-3 (tankette), a Polish military vehicle of the Second World War
- Teradako-ken TK-3, a Japanese transport plane of the Second World War
- TK-3 (missile) or Sky Bow III, a 2010s Taiwanese anti-aircraft system

== See also ==
- VR Class Tk3, a Finnish class of freight locomotive
