= Nakajima B3N =

Japanese carrier-based torpedo bomber prototype

B3N

General information
- Type: Torpedo bomber
- National origin: Japan
- Manufacturer: Nakajima Aircraft Company
- Status: Prototype
- Number built: 2

History
- First flight: 1933

The Nakajima B3N was a prototype Japanese carrier-based torpedo-bomber aircraft of the 1930s. A single-engined biplane with a crew of three, it was unsuccessful, only two being built.

== Development and design ==
In April 1932, the Imperial Japanese Navy placed orders with Mitsubishi and Nakajima for prototypes of three-seat torpedo-bombers to replace the relatively unsuccessful Mitsubishi B2M and the earlier Mitsubishi B1M aboard Japan's aircraft carriers. Nakajima's design was a single-engined biplane with a slender circular section fuselage of steel tube construction. It had single-bay metal and fabric wings, with both the upper and lower wings gulled to meet the fuselage, with the upper wings gulled normally and the lower wings in an inverted gull arrangement, forming an X shape. It had a tailwheel undercarriage, with the main wheels attached to the lower wing where the gulled section joined the main wing. The new 700 hp (522 kW) Nakajima Hikari engine was chosen to power the aircraft, driving a three-bladed fixed-pitch metal propeller.

Nakajima built two prototypes in 1933, with the internal designation Nakajima Y3B, as the Experimental 7-Shi Carrier Attack Aircraft, with the short designation B3N1 but the prototype Hikari engines proved unreliable, and the type was not accepted by the Navy. Mitsubishi's competing 7-Shi design, the Rolls-Royce Buzzard powered 3MT10 was also a failure, the sole prototype crashing on take-off in 1934, with the design from the Navy's own Air Technical Arsenal at Yokosuka, which was started later than the competing designs from Mitsubishi and Nakajima and therefore managed to avoid some of their flaws, being ordered into production as the Yokosuka B3Y.

== Specifications (B3N1) ==
Data from Japanese Aircraft 1910-41

General characteristics

- Crew: 3 (pilot, navigator/bomb aimer and gunner)
- Length: 10 m (32 ft 10 in)
- Wingspan: 14 m (45 ft 11 in)
- Height: 3.80 m (12 ft 6 in)
- Wing area: 50.0 m^{2} (538 sq ft)
- Empty weight: 2,000 kg (4,409 lb)
- Gross weight: 3,800 kg (8,378 lb)
- Powerplant: 1 × Nakajima Hikari 2 9-cylinder radial engine, 520 kW (700 hp)
- Propellers: 3-bladed

Performance

- Maximum speed: 220 km/h (140 mph, 120 kn)
- Stall speed: 93 km/h (58 mph, 50 kn)
- Endurance: 6 hr
- Service ceiling: 5,500 m (18,000 ft)
- Time to altitude: 12 minutes to 3,000 m (9,800 ft)

Armament

- Guns: 1 × flexibly mounted 7.7 mm machine gun
- Bombs: 1 × 800 kg (1,760 lb) torpedo, or 1 × 800 kg bomb, or 2 × 250 kg bombs

== See also ==
Aircraft of comparable role, configuration, and era

- Yokosuka B3Y
- Blackburn Shark
