= Nakajima Ki-19 =

Ki-19
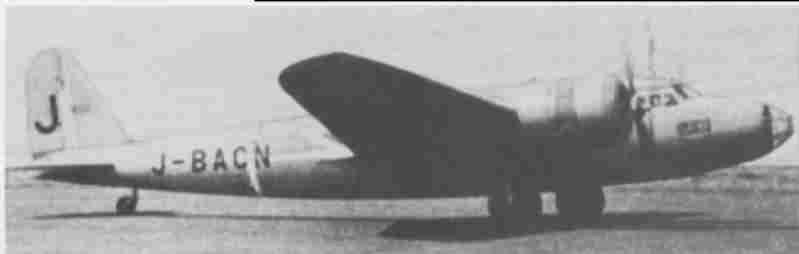
- Nakajima Ki-19 after civilian conversion for Domei Tsushin news agency

General information
- Type: prototype twin-engine heavy bomber
- Manufacturer: Nakajima Aircraft Company
- Primary user: IJA Air Force
- Number built: 4

History
- First flight: August 1937

The Nakajima Ki-19 (中島 キ19, Ki-jyukyu) was an unsuccessful attempt by Nakajima Aircraft Company to meet a 1935 requirement issued by the Japanese government for a modern bomber to replace the Mitsubishi Ki-1 heavy bomber.

== Design and development ==
Unlike in earlier projects, the Imperial Japanese Army issued, in February 1936, detailed specifications that had to be met by the new aircraft. These included a maximum speed 399 km/h (248 mph) at 3,000 m (9,840 ft); climb to altitude in under eight minutes; take-off in less than 300 m (980 ft); normal operating altitude from 2,000 m (6,560 ft) to 4,000 m (13,120 ft); and endurance of more than five hours at 299 km/h (186 mph) at 3,000 m (9,840 ft). Structural strength was specified as well, including a load factor of six while at high angle of attack, and four while in a glide. Minimum bombload for short-range missions was to be 1,500 kg (3,310 lb) with a variety of load configurations. Loaded, the bomber was to have a weight of less than 1,000 kg (2,200 lb). Other specified requirements were a crew of from four to six; engines to be either the Nakajima Ha-5 or Mitsubishi Ha-6; and three gun positions (nose, dorsal, and ventral, each with one flexible 7.7 mm (0.303 in) Type 89 machine gun). The Hi-2 (Type 94) or Hi-5 radio and other details were also specified.

Nakajima's veteran design team included Kenichi Matsumura as chief designer, assisted by Setsuro Nishimura and Toshio Matsuda, all of whom had previous twin-engine design experience on the Nakajima's licensed-produced version of the Douglas DC-2 commercial airliner project, and the short-lived LB-2 long-range attack bomber project for the Imperial Japanese Navy.

The Ki-19 was a mid-wing cantilever monoplane of all-metal construction with fabric-covered control surfaces. The aircraft had a bomb bay within a very streamlined fuselage, as opposed to carrying the bombs externally. Douglas-type hydraulically-operated retractable landing gear and split-flaps were used.

Performance testing by the Tachikawa Army Air Technical Research Institute with the competing Mitsubishi Ki-21 lasted from March to May 1937. Evaluation was continued at the Army's main bomber base at Hamamatsu for bombing and other operational testing beginning in June. Not completely satisfied with the combinations of airframe and engines, the Army ordered both Ki-19 prototypes to be powered by Mitsubishi Ha-6 engines, while the two prototypes of the Mitsubishi Ki-21 were also converted to be powered by Nakajima Ha-5 engines.

Prototypes from the two companies were almost identical in performance, but the Army officially selected the Mitsubishi Ki-21 as the "Army Type 97 Heavy Bomber", Nakajima having lost the Army contract.

The fourth prototype was converted to the mail plane in April 1939; it got the new designation N-19. It was commonly referred to as the N-19 Long-Range Communications Aircraft and sold to the Domei Tsushin (Domei Press Agency) under registration J-BACN and was named Domei No.2.

== Variants ==
- Ki-19 : Prototype for testing (2 units produced in 1937)
- N-19 : One prototype converted to mail plane.

== Operators ==
Japan

- Imperial Japanese Army Air Force
- Domei Tsushin

== Specifications (Ki-19) ==
Data from Japanese Aircraft, 1910-1941

General characteristics

- Crew: 5 (Pilot, co-pilot, navigator/bombardier, radio-operator/gunner and gunner)
- Length: 15 m (49 ft 3 in)
- Wingspan: 22 m (72 ft 2 in)
- Height: 3.65 m (12 ft 0 in)
- Wing area: 62.694 m^{2} (674.83 sq ft)
- Empty weight: 4,750 kg (10,472 lb)
- Gross weight: 7,150 kg (15,763 lb)
- Powerplant: 2 × Nakajima Ha5 14-cylinder air-cooled radial piston engines, 660 kW (890 hp) each
- Propellers: 3-bladed Hamilton Standard variable-pitch propellers

Performance

- Maximum speed: 352 km/h (219 mph, 190 kn)
- Cruise speed: 300 km/h (190 mph, 160 kn)
- Range: 4,000 km (2,500 mi, 2,200 nmi)
- Wing loading: 113.5 kg/m^{2} (23.2 lb/sq ft)
- Power/mass: 0.1807 kW/kg (0.1099 hp/lb)

Armament

- Guns: 3× flexible 7.7 mm (0.303 in) Type 89 machine guns in nose, dorsal and ventral positions.
- Bombs: 1,000 kg (2,205 lb) bombs

== See also ==
Related lists

- List of military aircraft of Japan
