= Imperial Japanese Airways =

National airline of the Empire of Japan during World War 2

Japan Airways Co.Ltd 大日本航空株式会社
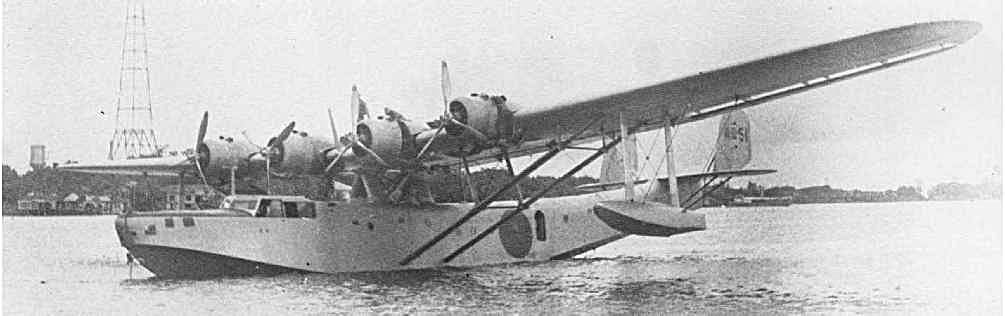
IATA	ICAO	Call sign
IJ	IJA	IMPERIAL
- Founded: December 1938
- Ceased operations: October 1945
- Hubs: Haneda Airport; Itami Airport; Fukuoka No. 1 Airport; Matsuyama Airport (Taipei); Keijo Airport (Seoul)
- Headquarters: Tokyo, Japan
- Key people: Kodama Tsuneo (1938–1939); Nakagawa Kenzō(1939–1944)
- Total equity: JPY 100 million (1939)

Japan Airways Co.Ltd (大日本航空株式会社, Dai Nippon Kōkū Kabushiki Kaisha; also known as Imperial Japanese Airlines, Great Japan Airlines or Greater Japan Airlines) was the national airline of the Empire of Japan during World War II.

== History ==
With the start of the Second Sino-Japanese War, there was a tremendous need for air transport capability by the Japanese military, which had traditionally drawn on the resources of the civilian national flag carrier, Japan Air Transport, for its charter requirements. As Japan Air Transport's capacity was limited, conflict arose between the Imperial Japanese Army and Imperial Japanese Navy over priority, and the government saw the need for the creation of a single, national monopoly. The government bought a 50 percent share of Japan Air Transport, and renamed it the Dai Nippon Kōkū in December 1938.

In the late 1930s, Dai Nippon Kōkū operated an extensive international network with a combination of foreign and domestic aircraft. The airline was linked with Manchukuo National Airways for routes in Chosen and Manchukuo, and also had routes in the Japanese occupied portions of mainland China. Internally, Dai Nippon Kōkū linked the Japanese home islands with the Kwantung Leased Territory, Korea, Taiwan, Karafuto, and Saipan and Palau in the South Seas Mandate. The airline served the west and central Pacific areas using converted military flying boats. The airline operated some longer charter flights, including flights to Iran and Italy in 1939, and had long-term plans to serve Europe through two routes, one passing through Manchuria and Central Asia and the other running from Bangkok through India and the Middle East.

After the start of the Pacific War in 1942, the airline became completely government-owned and operated as two separate units under the control of the Imperial Japanese Army and Imperial Japanese Navy respectively. By 1943, the airline flew a circular military convoy route from Taiwan through the Philippines, Indonesia, Singapore, Thailand and southern China. Operations continued until the surrender of Japan in August 1945, despite heavy losses. Haneda Airport was seized by Allied forces in September, and the airline was formally disbanded in October. During the Allied occupation, surviving aircraft and equipment were confiscated, and domestic civil aviation in Japan was banned until the formation of Japan Air Lines in 1951. Civil aviation to and from Japan was restored in 1947 with flights operated by Northwest Orient Airlines and Pan American Airways from Haneda.

== Fleet ==
- Douglas DC-4E
- Kawanishi H6K2-L
- Kawanishi H6K4-L
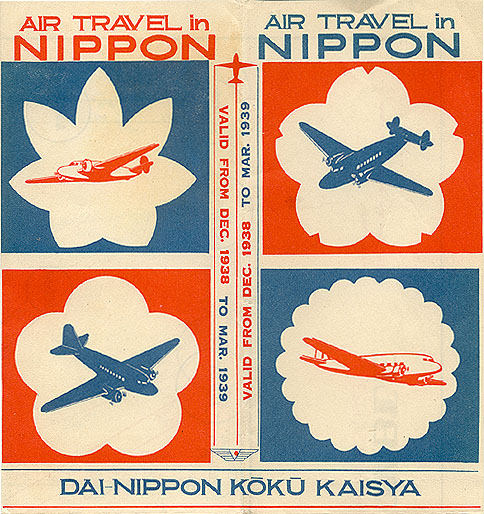
- Cover of timetable for Dai Nippon Kōkū
  Kawanishi H8K2-L Seiku
- Kawasaki Ki-56
- Kokusai Ki-59
- Mitsubishi K3M3-L
- Mitsubishi MC-20
- Mitsubishi MC-21
- Nakajima AT-2
- Nakajima/Douglas DC-2
- Nakajima Ki-6
- Showa/Nakajima L2D2
- Tachikawa LO
- Tachikawa Y-59

The airline contracted to purchase long-range Focke-Wulf Fw 200 Condor aircraft from Germany in 1939, but never took delivery.

== Accidents and incidents ==
8 December 1938
Nakajima/Douglas DC-2 (J-BBOH, Fuji) crashed in the East China Sea off the Kerama Islands due to engine failure, killing 10 of 12 on board; the two survivors were rescued by steamship Miyake Maru.
17 May 1939
Lockheed 14-WG3B Super Electra (J-BCOZ, Kuma) struck a fence on takeoff from Fukuoka Airport and crashed, killing six of 11 on board.
26 August 1944
J.I.A transport piloted by Toshio Kuroiwa went missing off the Malay Peninsula.
