= Nakajima Aircraft Company =

Japanese aircraft manufacturer (1918–1945)

- Founded: 1918
- Founder: Chikuhei Nakajima
- Defunct: 1945
- Successor: Fuji Heavy Industries (Subaru Corporation)
- Headquarters: Tokyo, Japan

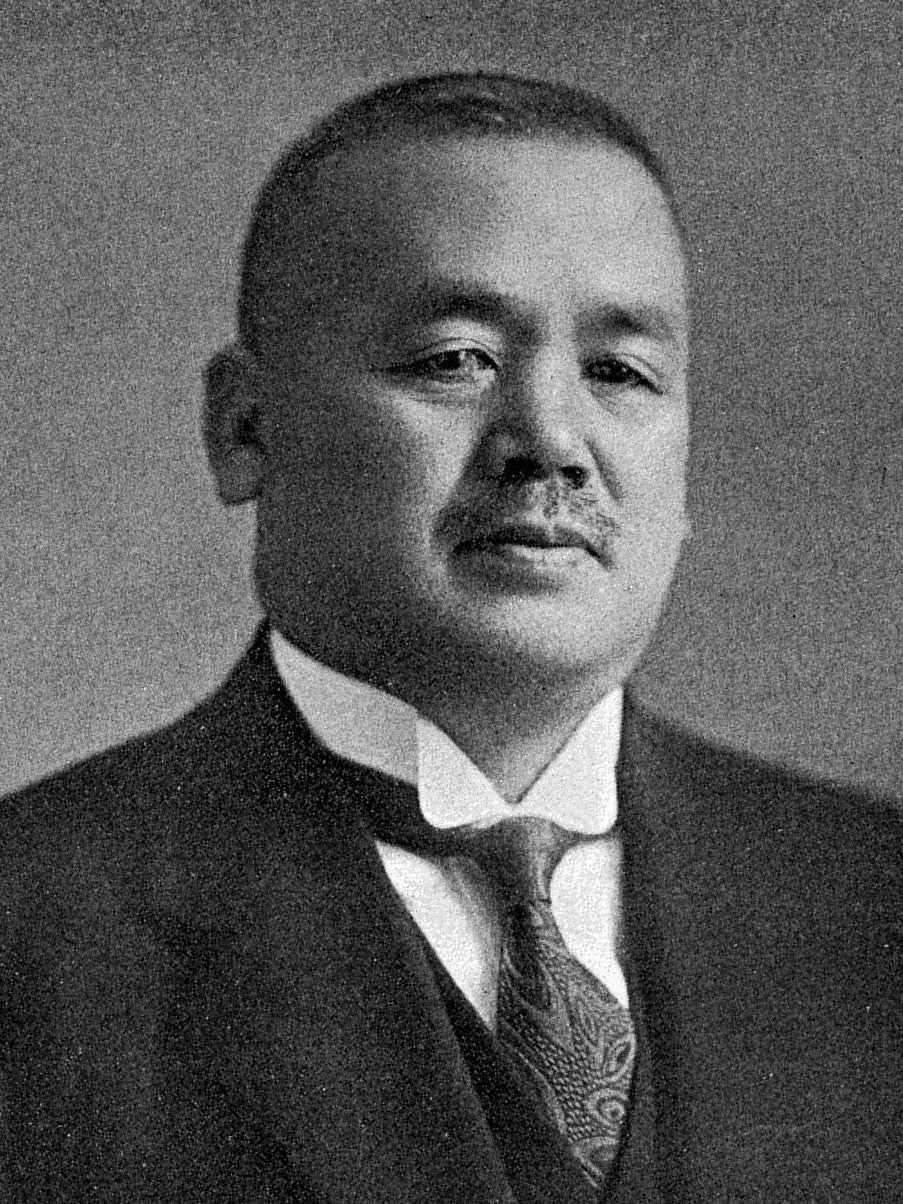
Founder, Chikuhei Nakajima

The Nakajima Aircraft Company (中島飛行機株式会社, Nakajima Hikōki Kabushiki Kaisha) was a prominent Japanese aircraft manufacturer and aviation engine manufacturer throughout World War II. It continues as the car and aircraft manufacturer Subaru Corporation.

== History ==
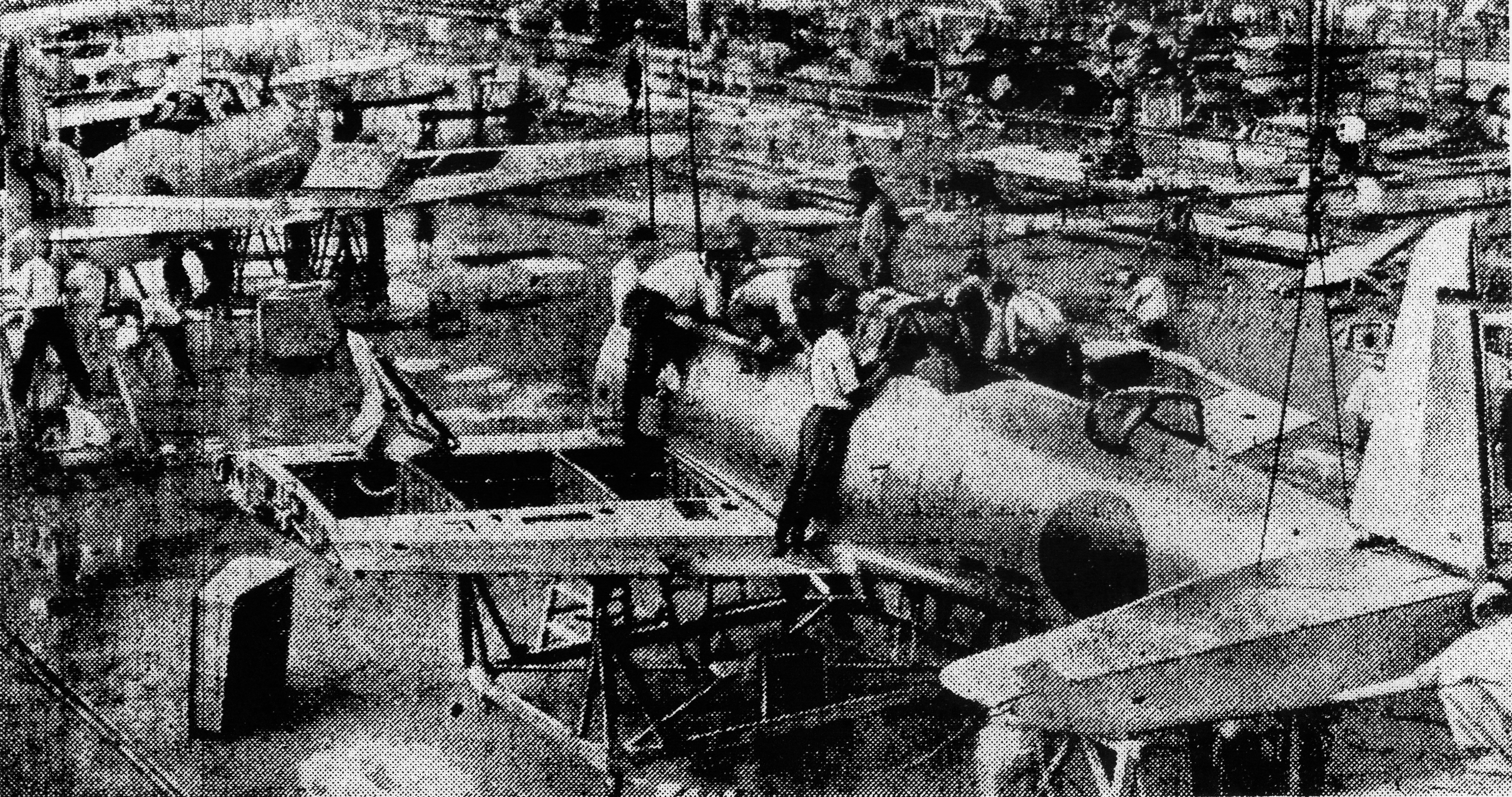
Assembly work at Nakajima-Handa

The Nakajima Aircraft company was Japan's first aircraft manufacturer, and was founded in 1918 by Chikuhei Nakajima, a naval engineer, and Seibei Kawanishi, a textile manufacturer, as Nihon Hikoki (Nippon Aircraft). In 1919, the two founders split and Nakajima bought out Nihon Aircraft's factory with tacit help from the Imperial Japanese Army. The company was renamed Nakajima Aircraft Company in 1919.

The company's manufacturing facilities were:

- Tokyo plant
- Musashino plant
- Donryu plant
- Ota plant, near Ōta Station. Visited by Emperor Shōwa on November 16, 1934. Critically damaged by American bombardment on February 10, 1945. Currently a Subaru Corporation plant for kei trucks.
- Koizumi plant, near Nishi-Koizumi Station. Critically damaged by American bombardment on April 3, 1945. Currently a Sanyo plant.

== After World War II ==
After Japan's defeat in World War II, the company was forced to close, as the production and research of aircraft was prohibited by the Supreme Commander for the Allied Powers. This had a severe impact on Nakajima as one of the two largest aircraft manufacturers in Japan; the second was Mitsubishi Heavy Industries (MHI). Unlike MHI, Nakajima did not diversify into shipbuilding and general machinery, and so was forced to dissolve into a number of spin-off companies set up by its former managers, engineers, and workers. As a result, leading aeronautical engineers from the company, such as Ryoichi Nakagawa, helped transform Japan's automobile industry.

The company was reborn in 1953 as Fuji Heavy Industries, maker of Fuji Rabbit scooters and Subaru automobiles, and as Fuji Precision Industries (later renamed Prince Motor Company, which merged with Nissan in August 1966), manufacturer of Prince Skyline and Prince Gloria automobiles. Fuji began aircraft production in the mid-1950s and produced military training aircraft and helicopters for the Japan Self-Defense Forces. In 2017, it rebranded as Subaru Corporation.

== Products ==
=== Naval aircraft ===
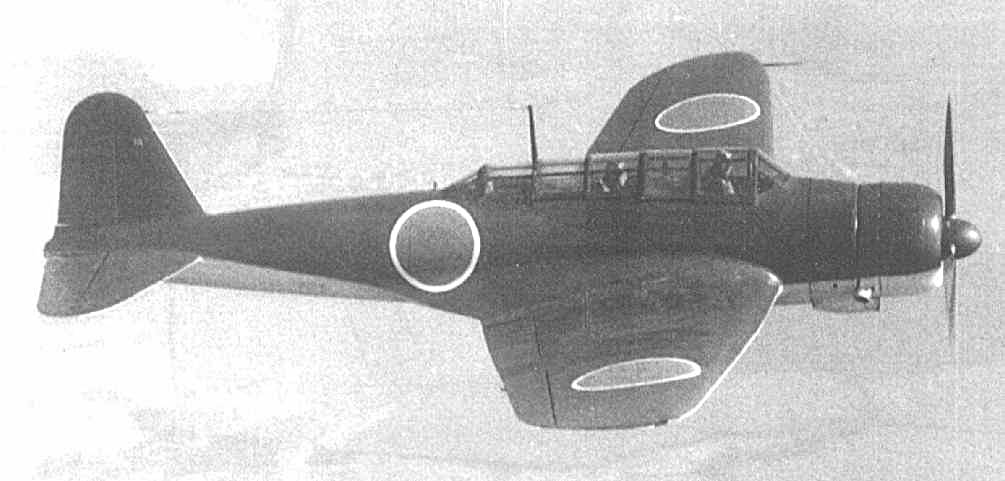
Nakajima B5N carrier attack bomber

==== Fighter ====
- A1N - Type 3 carrier fighter (三式艦上戦闘機) - 1927 carrier-borne fighter; licensed copy of the Gloster Gambet
- A2N - Type 90 carrier fighter (九〇式艦上戦闘機) - 1930 carrier biplane fighter
- A4N - Type 95 carrier fighter (九五式艦上戦闘機) - 1935 carrier-borne fighter
- A6M2-N - Ni-shiki suisen (二式水戦, Type 2 float fighter) - 'Rufe' 1941 floatplane version of the Mitsubishi A6M Zero
- J1N - Gekkō (月光, Moonlight) - 'Irving' 1941 Navy land-based night fighter
- J5N - Tenrai (天雷, Heavenly/Divine Thunder) - 1944 Navy land-based single-seat twin-engine interceptor prototype
- Kikka - Kikka (中島 橘花, Orange Blossom) - 1945 jet-engined interceptor prototype; Japan's first jet aircraft

==== Trainer ====
- A3N - Type 90 Two-seat training fighter (九〇式複座練習戦闘機) - 1936 two-seat trainer developed from the A2N

==== Torpedo bomber ====
- B3N - 1933 Navy torpedo bomber prototype, lost contract to the Yokosuka B3Y
- B4N - 1936 Navy torpedo bomber prototype, lost contract to the Yokosuka B4Y
- B5N - Type 97 carrier attacker (九七式艦攻, Kyuushichi-shiki Kanko) - 'Kate' 1937 Navy torpedo bomber
- B6N - Tenzan (天山, Heavenly Mountain) - 'Jill' 1941 Navy torpedo bomber

==== Scout and reconnaissance aircraft ====
- C2N - land-based reconnaissance aircraft based on the Nakajima Ki-6
- C3N - Type 97 carrier reconnaissance aircraft (九七式艦上偵察機) - 1936 carrier-borne reconnaissance aircraft
- C6N - Saiun (彩雲, Rainbow Cloud) - 'Myrt' 1943 carrier-borne reconnaissance aircraft
- E2N - Type 15 reconnaissance floatplane (一五式水上偵察機)- 1927 reconnaissance aircraft
- E4N - Type 90-2 reconnaissance seaplane (九〇式二号水上偵察機)1930 reconnaissance aircraft
- E8N - Type 95 reconnaissance seaplane (九五式水上偵察機) - 'Dave' 1935 reconnaissance seaplane
- E12N - 1938 reconnaissance seaplane prototype, lost to the Kawanishi E12K

==== Dive bomber ====
- D2N
- D3N - 1936 carrier-based dive bomber prototype based on the C3N and B5N, lost to the Aichi D3A

==== Heavy bomber ====
- G5N - Shinzan (深山, Deep Mountain) - 'Liz' 1941 heavy four-engine long-range heavy bomber prototype for Project Z
- G8N - Renzan (連山, Mountain Range) - 'Rita' 1945 heavy four-engine long-range heavy bomber
- Fugaku - Fugaku (富嶽, Mount Fuji) - 1945 projected six-engine long-range bomber for Project Z; the G10N designation is a postwar extrapolation and was not officially used

==== Transport ====
- L1N - naval version of Ki-34
- L2D - Type 0 Transport (零式輸送機) -1939 Navy transport aircraft; licensed copy of Douglas DC-3

=== Army aircraft ===
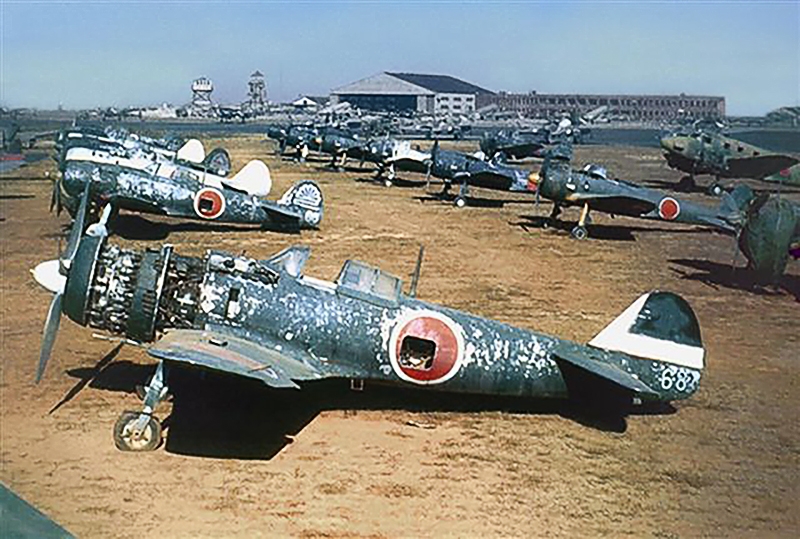
Ki-43 Hayabusa and Ki-84 Hayate, Post-war

==== Fighter ====
- Ko 3 (甲3) - fighter-trainer, license-built Nieuport 24
- Ko 4 (甲4) - biplane fighter, license-built Nieuport-Delage NiD 29
- Type 91 fighter (九一式戦闘機) - 1931 parasol monoplane fighter
- Ki-8 - 1934 fighter prototype
- Ki-11 - 1934 fighter prototype, lost to the Kawasaki Ki-10
- Ki-12 - 1936 fighter prototype, lost to the Mitsubishi Ki-18
- Ki-27 - Type 97 Fighter (九七式戦闘機) - late 1936 Army monoplane fighter
- Ki-37 - 1937 fighter (project only)
- Ki-43 - Type 1 Fighter (一式単座戦闘機) or Hayabusa (隼, Peregrine Falcon) - 'Oscar' 1939 Army fighter
- Ki-44 - Type 2 Single-seat fighter (二式単座戦闘機) or Shōki (鍾馗, Devil-Queller) - 'Tojo' 1940 Army fighter
- Ki-53 - multi-seat heavy fighter (project only)
- Ki-58 - escort fighter prototype based on the Ki-49
- Ki-62 - 1941 prototype fighter, competed with Kawasaki Ki-61 design
- Ki-63 - version of Ki-62 powered by a radial engine
- Ki-75 - heavy fighter (project only)
- Ki-84 - Type 4 Fighter (四式戦闘機) or Hayate (疾風, Gale) - 'Frank' 1943 Army fighter
- Ki-87 - 1945 high-altitude fighter-interceptor prototype
- Ki-101 - twin-engine night fighter based on the J1N (project only)
- Ki-113 - Ki-84 with some steel parts (project only)
- Ki-116 - 1945 single-seat fighter prototype
- Ki-117 - production designation of the Ki-84N
- Ki-118 - short-range fighter modified from the Mitsubishi A7M (project only)
- Ki-201 - Karyū (火龍, Fire Dragon) - prototype 1945 Army jet fighter/attack aircraft with strong resemblance to the German Messerschmitt Me 262 (project only)
- Ki-337 - two-seat fighter (project only)

==== Bomber ====
- B-6 - license-built Bréguet 14B.2
- Ki-13 - attack aircraft (project only)
- Ki-19 - 1937 Army twin-engine heavy bomber (prototypes only), lost to the Mitsubishi Ki-21
- Ki-31 - two-seat light bomber (project only)
- Ki-49 - Type 100 Heavy Bomber (一〇〇式重爆撃機) or Donryū (呑龍, Storm Dragon) - 'Helen' 1941 Army heavy bomber
- Ki-52 - dive bomber, army version of D3N (project only)
- Ki-68 - army bomber version of G5N (project only)
- Ki-82 - high-speed heavy bomber (project only)

==== Reconnaissance ====
- Ki-4 - Type 94 Reconnaissance aircraft (九四式偵察機) - 1933 reconnaissance biplane

==== Transport ====
- Ki-6 - Type 95 Trainer (九五式二型練習機) - 1930 transport, training aircraft; licensed copy of the Fokker Super Universal
- Ki-16 - cargo transport/ground refueling aircraft based on the Douglas DC-2 (project only)
- Ki-34 - Type 97 Transport (九七式輸送機) - 'Thora' 1937 Army transport aircraft version of AT-2
- Ki-41 - cargo transport (project only)
- Ki-50 - aerial refueling/fuel tanker version of the Ki-49
- Ki-80 - formation commander version of the Ki-49

==== Trainer ====
- Ko 2 (甲2) - trainer, license-built version of the Nieuport 83 trainer

==== Kamikaze aircraft ====
- Ki-115 - Tsurugi (剣, Sword) - 1945 kamikaze aircraft; in IJN service, it was called Tōka (藤花, Wisteria Blossom)
- Ki-230 - projected kamikaze aircraft

==== Jet prototypes ====
- Kikka (橘花, Orange Blossom) - 1945 Navy experimental land-based ground attack/ASW jet influenced by the Messerschmitt Me 262, two prototypes built; first Japanese jet aircraft

=== Civil aircraft ===
- Nakajima-Douglas DC-2 - license-built Douglas DC-2
- Super Universal - 1930 airliner; license-built Fokker Super Universal
- AN-1 - a Ki-11 prototype converted to a liaison/courier aircraft for the Asahi Shimbun
- AT-1 - original design of AT-2
- AT-2 - 1936 passenger transport
- LB-2 - Akatsuki-gō (暁号, Dawn) - 1936 navy's bomber prototype turned airliner
- N-19 - a Ki-19 prototype converted to a mail plane for the Dōmei Tsushin
- Nakajima N-36 - 1928 transport prototype
- Nakajima P-1 - 1933 mail plane; converted from E4N

=== Aircraft engines ===
- Kotobuki (寿, Longevity); license-built Bristol Jupiter
- Ha5
- Hikari (光, Light), development of the Nakajima Kotobuki
- Sakae (栄, Prosperity) - powered both the Mitsubishi A6M Zero, and its own Nakajima Ki-43 Oscar fighters. Known as Type 99 in Army service and NK1 in Navy service
- Homare (誉, Honor), air-cooled twin-row 18 cylinder radial
- Ha-49
- Mamoru (護, Protect)
- Ha-109
- Ha219 (later known as the Ha-44)

== See also ==
- List of aircraft manufacturers
- Subaru
