= Nakajima Kotobuki =

1930s Japanese piston aircraft engine

Kotobuki
- Type: Piston aircraft engine
- Manufacturer: Nakajima Aircraft Company
- Major applications: Mitsubishi A5M

The Nakajima Ha1 Kotobuki (寿, "Longevity") was an aero-engine developed by Nakajima. It was a radial piston developed under licence from the Bristol Jupiter.

== Design and development ==
In 1917, Chikuhei Nakajima set up the "Airplane Institute" at Ojima Town in Gunma Prefecture. In 1918 they built their first airplane; the "Nakajima Type 1" with a U.S.A. made engine. In 1920 the company sent Kimihei Nakajima to France to study European advances, and in 1922 started their own engine factory in Tokyo. This led to production of engines based on the Lawrance A-3 two-cylinder air-cooled horizontally opposed engine.

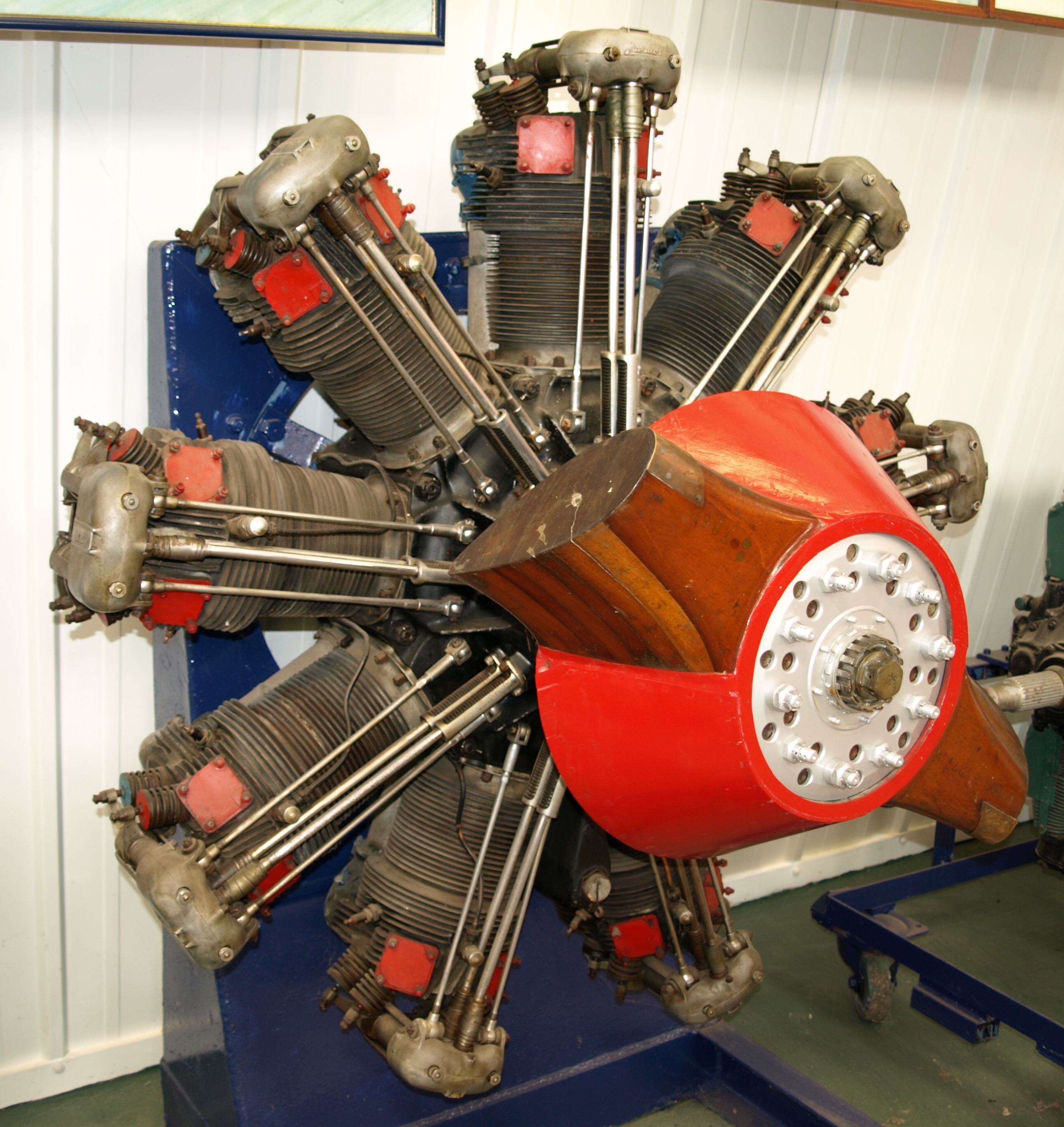
Bristol Jupiter VII on display at the Shuttleworth Collection

At the time the Lawrence was an oddity. Most air-cooled engines at that time were rotary engines using cylinders that rotated together with the propeller, but Kimihei overheard that an engine with good cooling capability with fixed cylinders was being developed in England. He observed the English Gloster Gamecock fighter with its Bristol Jupiter engine, which was an advanced design for the era with an automatic adjustment device for tappet clearance, spiral piping for even intake distribution, and a four-valve intake and exhaust system. He acquired a manufacturing license for the Jupiter in 1925. In 1927, after inviting two production engineer instructors from the Bristol company, the Jupiter Type 6 of 420 PS and Type 7 of 450 PS with a supercharger were put into production at the Nakajima factory.

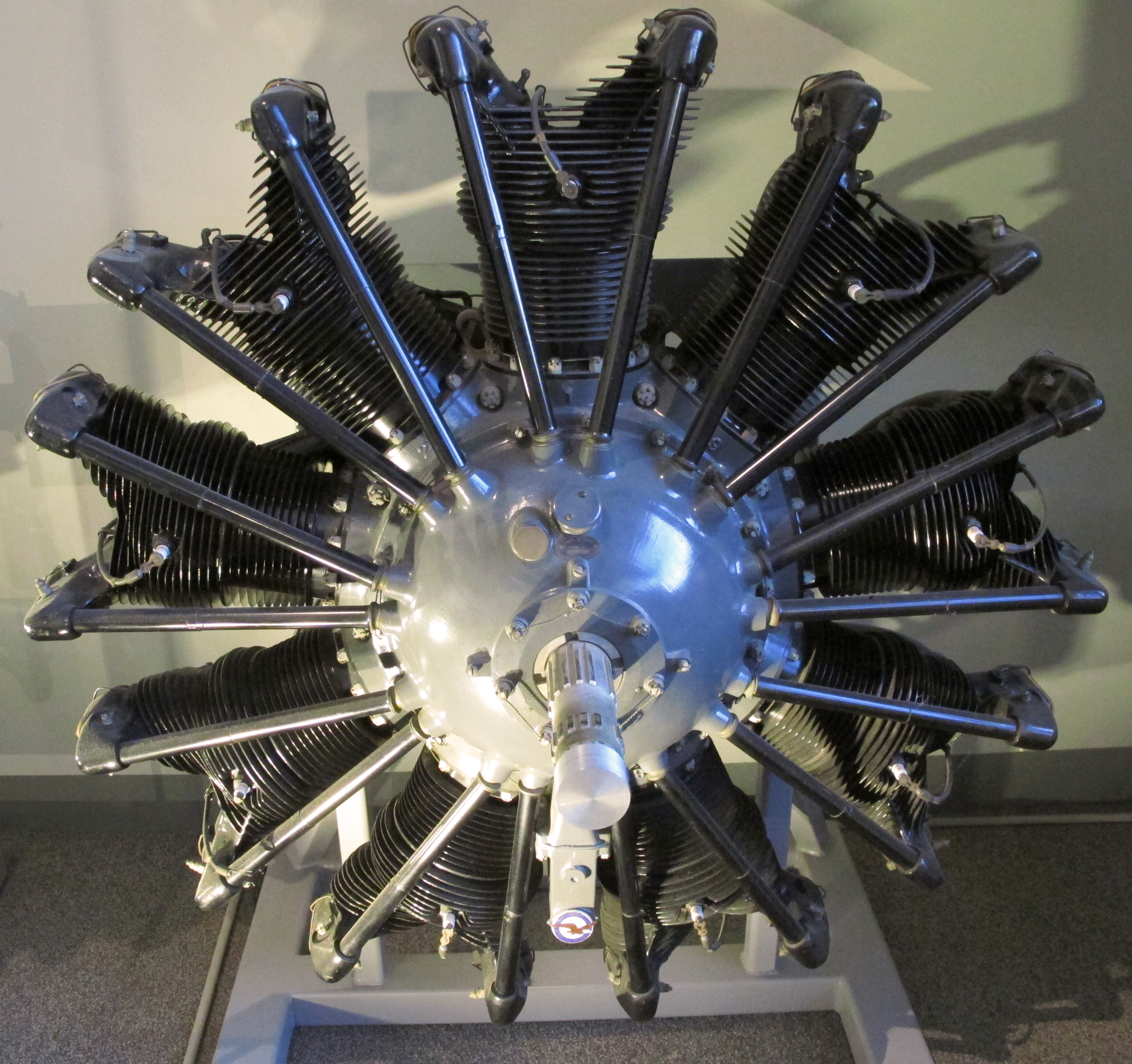
The first radial engine Pratt & Whitney R-1340 Wasp

After studying the Pratt & Whitney Wasp 9-cylinder radial, Nakajima tried to combine the good points found in Jupiter design with the rational design of the Wasp. Nakajima then produced a series of engine types, named "AA", "AB", "AC", and "AD", as engineering exercises. The next engine design, the "AE", was innovative, with a bore of 160 mm and a stroke of 170 mm.

Prototypes were made and performance tests were done, but this engine was not adopted due to its very complex engineering. Nakajima continued testing different cylinder designs. In 1929, the "AH" design, with bore and stroke of 146 × 160 mm and a total displacement of 24.1 L, was completed. This was to be the final version of this basic engine design.

In June 1930 the first prototype of was completed and it passed the durability test for the type approval in the summer. Then flight tests were started using a Nakajima A2N carrier plane. Nakajima had designed the first Japanese originally designed air-cooled 9-cylinder engine, the 450 PS "Kotobuki". In December 1931, this engine was approved and adopted by the Navy as the Ha-1 Ko for the Type 97 carrier fighter. The engine was named, in connection with the Jupiter engine, "Kotobuki".

The "Kotobuki" engine was improved and developed into the "Hikari (light)" engine with the bore and stroke expanded to the limit of the cylinder (160 × 180 mm for a displacement of 32.6 L), with the power was increased to 720 PS. The "Hikari" was used in Type 95 carrier fighters and Type 96 Carrier Attack Plane.

In search of more power the basic design was extended into a 14-cylinder 2-row engine, the "Ha-5 Ha-41 Ha-109" series.

== Variants ==
2-Kai-1
585 hp (436 kW)
2-Kai-3
610 hp (455 kW)
3-Kai
710 hp (529 kW)
Ha1

Ha1a
Ha1b

== Applications ==
- Mitsubishi A5M
- Mitsubishi Ki-18
- Nakajima A1N2
- Nakajima A2N
- Nakajima Ki-8
- Nakajima Ki-27
- Nakajima E4N
- Nakajima E8N
- Nakajima Ki-34
- Nakajima Type 91

== Specifications ==
Data from Gunston.

=== General characteristics ===
- Type: 9-cylinder radial piston engine
- Bore: 146 mm (5.75 in)
- Stroke: 160 mm (6.3 in)
- Displacement: 24.1 L (1,471.1 cu in)
- Length: 1.021 mm
- Diameter: 1,280 mm
- Dry weight: 350 kg (772 lb)

=== Components ===
- Cooling system: Air-cooled

=== Performance ===
- Power output: 550–780 hp (410–580 kW)

== See also ==
- Nakajima Ha-5
- List of aircraft engines

== Bibliography ==
- Goodwin, Mike & Starkings, Peter (2017). Japanese Aero-Engines 1910-1945. Sandomierz, Poland: MMPBooks. ISBN 978-83-65281-32-6.
