= Nakajima Ki-8 =

Japanese fighter prototype

Ki-8
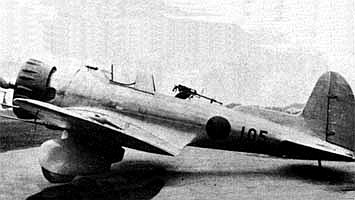
- Nakajima Ki-8

General information
- Type: prototype fighter aircraft
- Manufacturer: Nakajima Aircraft Company
- Primary user: Imperial Japanese Army Air Force
- Number built: 5

History
- First flight: 1934

The Nakajima Ki-8 (キ8, Ki-hachi) was an unsuccessful attempt by the Nakajima Aircraft Company to interest the Imperial Japanese Army Air Force in a two-seat modern monoplane fighter.

== Design & Development ==
Development of the Ki-8, (a.k.a. Nakajima DF), began in 1933, based on an all-metal two-seat aircraft, featuring low inverted gull wings, with fixed and spatted landing gear, powered by a single 410 kW (550 hp) Nakajima Kotobuki Ha-1-3 radial engine. Proposed armament consisted of twin 7.7 mm (.303 in) machine guns firing from between the engine cylinders and a third 7.7 mm (.303 in) machine gun on a flexible mount on the back of the rear cockpit.

In initial testing, the aircraft proved unpopular with test pilots, who raised concerns about the design's aerodynamic stability . The initial prototypes were also plagued with a variety of manufacturing defects and malfunctions. Though corrections were made to improve initial design and stability problems, the performance of the aircraft was considered no better than the existing Nakajima Type 91 fighter, and as the Japanese Army Air Force had no use for two-seat fighters, the project was cancelled in 1934, after five prototype aircraft had been produced, and before the start of full production.

== Variants ==
- Nakajima Ki-8 : initial prototype (five built)

== Operators ==
Japan

- Imperial Japanese Army Air Force

== Specifications (Ki-8) ==
Data from Famous Airplanes of the World, first series, #76: Army Experimental Fighters (1)

General characteristics

- Crew: two
- Length: 8.17 m (26 ft 9.6 in)
- Wingspan: 12.88 m (42 ft 3.1 in)
- Height: 3.57 m (11 ft 8.5 in)
- Wing area: 28.5 m^{2} (306.78 sq ft)
- Empty weight: 1,525 kg (3,362 lb)
- Gross weight: 2,111 kg (4,654 lb)
- Powerplant: 1 × Nakajima Ha-1 Kotobuki air-cooled radial engine , 410 kW (550 hp)

Performance

- Maximum speed: 328 km/h (204 mph, 177 kn)
- Range: 1,000 km (621 mi, 540 nmi)
- Service ceiling: 8,760 m (28,740 ft)

Armament

- 2× 7.7 mm (.303 in) forward-firing machine guns
- 1× 7.7 mm (.303 in) dorsal flexible machine gun
