= Nakajima LB-2 =

Japanese long range bomber

LB-2
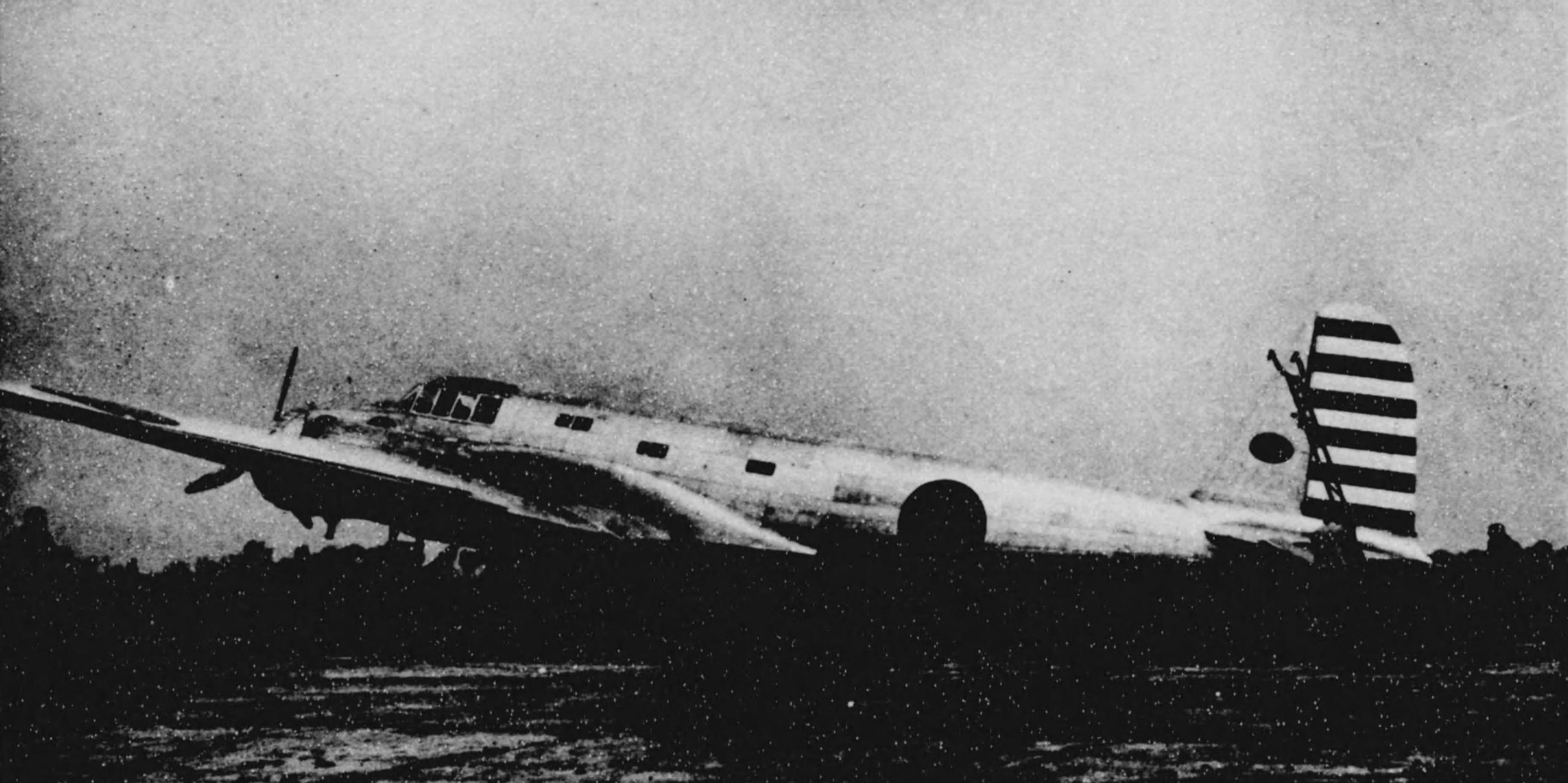

General information
- Type: Bomber
- National origin: Japan
- Manufacturer: Nakajima
- Designer: Kenichi Matsumara
- Primary user: Manchukuo National Airways
- Number built: 1

History
- First flight: 1936

The Nakajima LB-2 was a long-range, land-based bomber developed in Japan for use by the Imperial Japanese Navy. When rejected for military service, the sole prototype was converted into an airliner and, known as the Akatsuki-go (暁号 – "Dawn"), was operated by Manchukuo National Airways.

== Development and design ==
Kenichi Mitsumara's design was inspired by the Douglas DC-2 that Nakajima was building at the time under licence; a conventional, low-wing cantilever monoplane powered by twin engines. Construction was of metal throughout, and the main units of the tailwheel undercarriage retracted into the engine nacelles. The bomb load was carried in an internal bay.

The prototype LB-2 was completed in March 1936. It was considered for production, along with the Mitsubishi G1M, but eventually both were rejected in favour of the Mitsubishi Ka-15, which would be produced as the G3M. Adapted for civil use, the LB-2 prototype's bomb bay was replaced with a fuel tank and a cabin for six passengers was fitted, with the bombardier's position in the nose converted to store luggage.

== Operational history ==
The converted LB-2, now named Akatsuki-go, was delivered to Manchukuo National Airways in 1937, with it (and two Heinkel He 116s) intended to operate a service to the Soviet Union over the Tian Shan mountains. The outbreak of the Second Sino-Japanese War and the undeclared Soviet–Japanese Border Wars which culminated in the Battle of Khalkhin Gol stopped these plans, however, and the Akatsuki-go was scrapped at Shenyang in 1941.

== Specifications ==
Data from Japanese Aircraft 1910-1941.

General characteristics

- Length: 19.33 m (63 ft 5 in)
- Wingspan: 26.69 m (87 ft 6.5 in)
- Height: 5.45 m (17 ft 10.5 in)
- Wing area: 97.96 m^{2} (1,055 sq ft)
- Empty weight: 5,750 kg (12,676 lb)
- Gross weight: 9,630 kg (21,230 lb)
- Powerplant: 2 × Nakajima Hikari 2 , 600 kW (800 hp) each

Performance

- Maximum speed: 328 km/h (204 mph, 177 kn)
- Cruise speed: 242 km/h (150 mph, 130 kn)
- Range: 6,000 km (3,750 mi, 3,260 nmi)

Armament

- 2 × 7.7 mm (.303 in) Type 92 machine guns
- 800 kg (1,764 lb) of bombs
