= Nakajima Ki-62 =

Japanese WWII proposed fighter aircraft design

Ki-62

General information
- Type: Fighter aircraft
- National origin: Japan
- Manufacturer: Nakajima Aircraft Company
- Designer: T. Koyama
- Primary user: Imperial Japanese Army Air Force (intended)
- Number built: None

History
- Developed into: Nakajima Ki-84

The Nakajima Ki-62 was a Japanese World War II fighter aircraft proposed by the Nakajima Aircraft Company for use by the Imperial Japanese Army Air Force. Neither the Ki-62 project or its Ki-63 variant proceeded beyond the design stage.

== Design and development ==
To compete with the Kawasaki Ki-61 as a possible new light fighter for the Imperial Japanese Army, Nakajima designer T. Koyama developed the Ki-62. The design, a low-wing, single-seat monoplane with a bubble canopy powered by an 877-kilowatt (1,175-hp) Kawasaki Ha-40 liquid-cooled engine, showed promise, but Nakajima discontinued development of the Ki-62 in order to focus on production of its Ki-43 and Ki-44 fighters. The Ki-62 design was not wasted effort, however, as Nakajima later incorporated Ki-62 design features and data into its Ki-84 fighter.

== Variants ==
Nakajima also planned the Ki-63, a version of the Ki-62 powered by a 784 kW (1,051 hp) Mitsubishi Ha-102 radial engine, but did not pursue the design.

== Specifications ==
Data from Japanese Aircraft of the Pacific War

General characteristics

- Crew: 1
- Length: 8.75 m (28 ft 8 in)
- Wingspan: 12 m (39 ft 4 in)
- Powerplant: 1 × Kawasaki Ha-40 V-12 inverted liquid-cooled piston engine, 877 kW (1,176 hp)

Performance

== See also ==
Related development

- Nakajima Ki-43
- Nakajima Ki-84

Aircraft of comparable role, configuration, and era

- Messerschmitt Me 309
- North American P-51
- Yakovlev Yak-9
- Macchi C.202

Related lists

- List of military aircraft of Japan
