= Nakajima E4N =

Japanese reconnaissance aircraft

E4N
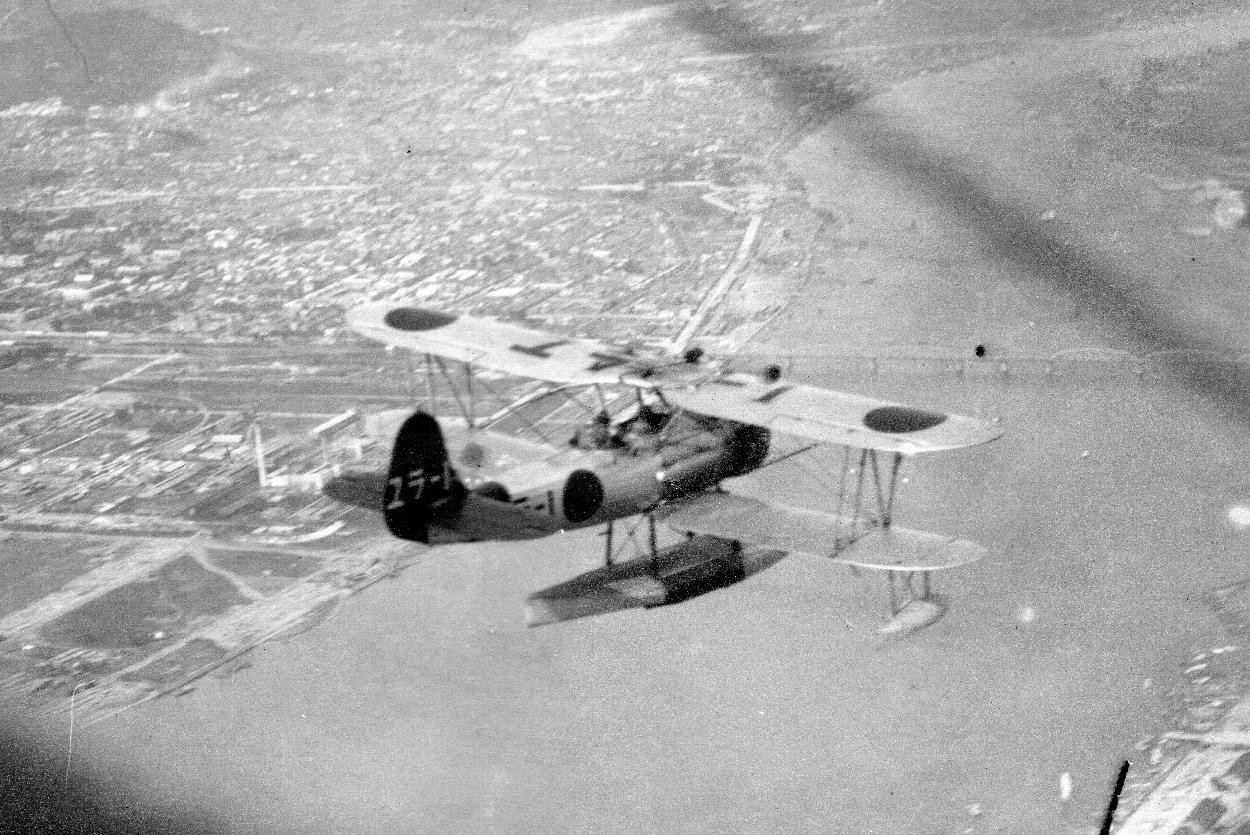
- E4N2

General information
- Type: Reconnaissance aircraft
- Manufacturer: Nakajima Aircraft Company
- Status: Retired
- Primary users: Imperial Japanese Navy Japanese Post Office
- Number built: 153

History
- Manufactured: 1931-1933
- Introduction date: 1931
- First flight: 1930

The Nakajima E4N was a Japanese shipboard reconnaissance aircraft of the 1930s. It was a two-seat, single-engine, equal-span biplane seaplane used primarily by the Imperial Japanese Navy.

== Development ==
The first prototype of the Type 90-2 Reconnaissance Seaplane, or E4N1, inspired by the Vought O2U Corsair, flew in 1930. This was fitted with twin floats and had no cowling for the engine. This prototype was rejected as not being very maneuverable. The plane was redesigned as the Type 90-2-2 or E4N2, with a single main-float and twin, wing-mounted outriggers, powered by a cowled Nakajima Kotobuki 2-kai-I nine-cylinder air-cooled radial engine. This entered production for the Navy in 1931. In December 1941 a more durable version was produced, the Type 90-2-2 (E4N2), and a wheeled version was introduced as the Type 90-2-3 (E4N3). A carrier version with wheels and arrestor gear, the E4N2-C, was trialed by 5 aircraft but ultimately not accepted for use. Between 1931 and 1936 Nakajima produced 80 E4Ns aircraft and Kawanishi produced 67 between 1932 and 1934. Nine aircraft were converted to night mail use in 1933, with one cockpit enclosed to hold mail and deliver it between the main islands of Japan. E4N2s took part in the January 28 incident between China and Japan. The aircraft was gradually replaced by the Nakajima E8N.

== Variants ==
E4N1

(Navy Type 90-2-1 Reconnaissance Seaplane) twin-float seaplane, Nakajima NZ - two prototypes only.

E4N2
(Navy Type 90-2-2 Reconnaissance Seaplane) - Nakajima NJ single-float seaplane. 85 built.
E4N2-C
(Navy Type 90-2-3 Carrier Reconnaissance Aircraft) - Nakajima NJ landplane fitted with arresting gear and fixed-undercarriage. 67 built.
E4N3
(Navy Type 90-2-3 Reconnaissance Seaplane) Nakajima NJ.
Nakajima P-1

Single-seat mailplane. 9 converted from E4N2-C airframes.
Nakajima Giyu-11
One of the two E4N1 seaplanes converted with a cabin for use by Tokyo Koku Yuso Kaisha between Haneda airport, Shimizu and Shimoda.

== Specifications (Type 90-2-2) ==
Data from Japanese Aircraft 1910-1941

General characteristics

- Crew: 2
- Length: 8.87 m (29 ft 1 in)
- Wingspan: 10.98 m (36 ft 0 in)
- Height: 3.97 m (13 ft 0 in)
- Wing area: 29.7 m^{2} (320 sq ft)
- Empty weight: 1,252 kg (2,760 lb)
- Gross weight: 1,800 kg (3,968 lb)
- Powerplant: × Nakajima Kotobuki 2 9-cylinder air-cooled radial piston engine, 433 kW (581 hp)
- Propellers: 2-bladed fixed-pitch propeller

Performance

- Maximum speed: 232 km/h (144 mph, 125 kn)
- Cruise speed: 148 km/h (92 mph, 80 kn)
- Range: 1,019 km (633 mi, 550 nmi)
- Service ceiling: 5,740 m (18,830 ft)
- Wing loading: 60.7 kg/m^{2} (12.4 lb/sq ft)
- Power/mass: 0.24 kW/kg (0.15 hp/lb)

Armament

- Guns: 1 × fixed, forward-firing 7.7 mm machine gun and 1 × flexible 7.7 mm machine gun in rear cockpit
- Bombs: 2 × 30 kg (66 lb) bombs

== See also ==
Aircraft of comparable role, configuration, and era

- Vought O3U Corsair
