= Mitsubishi Ki-57 =

Japanese transport aircraft

Ki-57
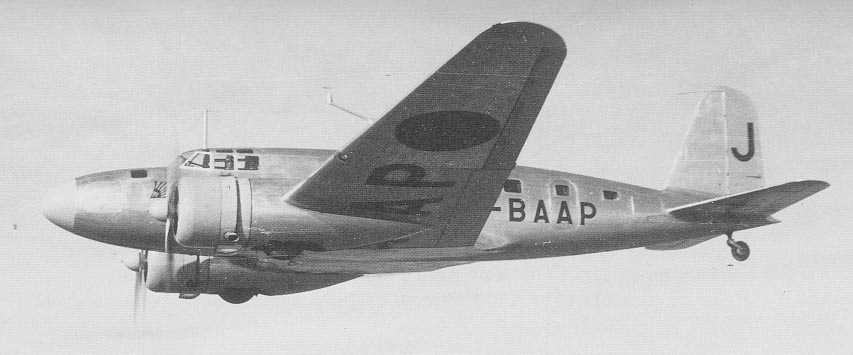
- MC-20-I, with a nickname Asagumo (morning cloud), used by Asahi Shimbun

General information
- Type: Transport aircraft Paratroop transport Passenger aircraft
- Manufacturer: Mitsubishi Heavy Industries
- Primary users: Imperial Japanese Army Air Force Imperial Japanese Navy Air Service; Imperial Japanese Airways
- Number built: 406

History
- Manufactured: 1940–1945
- Introduction date: 1942
- First flight: August 1940
- Developed from: Mitsubishi Ki-21

The Mitsubishi Ki-57 was a Japanese passenger transport aircraft, developed from the Ki-21 bomber, during the early 1940s.

== Development ==
In 1938, when the Ki-21 heavy bomber began to enter service with the Imperial Japanese Army, its capability attracted the attention of the Imperial Japanese Airways. In consequence, a civil version was developed, and this, generally similar to the Ki-21-I and retaining its powerplant of two 708 kW (950 hp) Nakajima Ha-5 KAI radial engines, differed primarily by having the same wings transferred from a mid- to low-wing configuration and the incorporation of a new fuselage to provide accommodation for up to eleven passengers. This transport version appealed also to the navy, and, following the flight of a prototype in August 1940 and subsequent testing, the type was ordered into production for both civil and military use.

This initial production Ki-57-I had the civil and military designations of MC-20-I and Army Type 100 Transport Model 1, respectively. A total of one-hundred production Ki-57-Is had been built by early 1942, and small numbers of them were transferred for use by the Japanese Navy in a transport role, then becoming redesignated L4M1. After the last of the Ki-57s had been delivered, production was switched to an improved Ki-57-II, which introduced more powerful 805 kW (1,080 hp) Mitsubishi Ha-102 14-cylinder radial engines installed in redesigned nacelles and, at the same time, incorporated a number of detail refinements and minor equipment changes. Civil and military designations of this version were the MC-20-II and Army Type 100 Transport Model 2, respectively. Only 406 were built before production ended in January 1945. Both versions were covered by the Allied reporting name Topsy.

== Variants ==
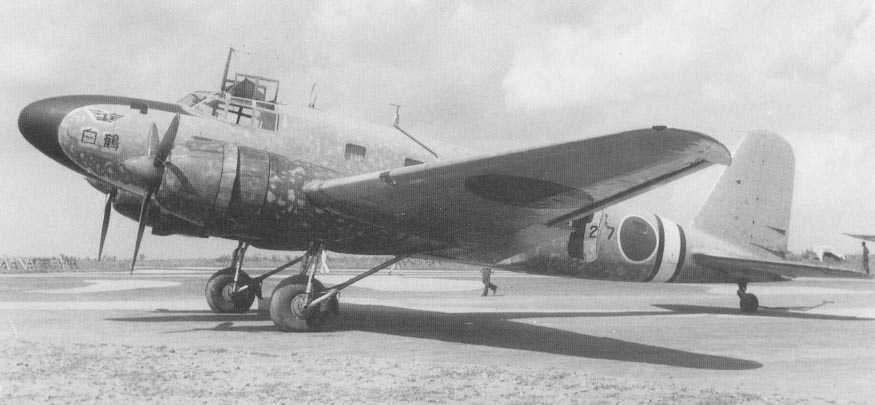
MC-20-II with the nickname Hakutsuru (white crane) during the Sino-Japanese war

Ki-57-I Army Type 100 Transport Model 1
Powered by two 708 kW (950 hp) Nakajima Ha-5 KAI radial engines and a redesigned fuselage to accommodate 11 passengers. About 100 aircraft of this type were built including the civil version.
MC-20-I
Same as above but built for civil use with Imperial Japanese Airways (Dai Nippon Koku KK).
Ki-57-II Army Type 100 Transport Model 2
Powered by two 805 kW (1,080 hp) Mitsubishi Ha-102 Zuisei 14-cylinder radial engines installed in redesigned nacelles. Minor equipment and detail refinements were also incorporated. 306 aircraft of this type were produced before the end of production in January 1945.
MC-20-II
Same as above but built for civil use with Imperial Japanese Airways (Dai Nippon Koku KK).
L4M1
A small number of Ki-57-Is were transferred for test by the Japanese Navy as transports and were redesignated L4M1.

== Operators ==
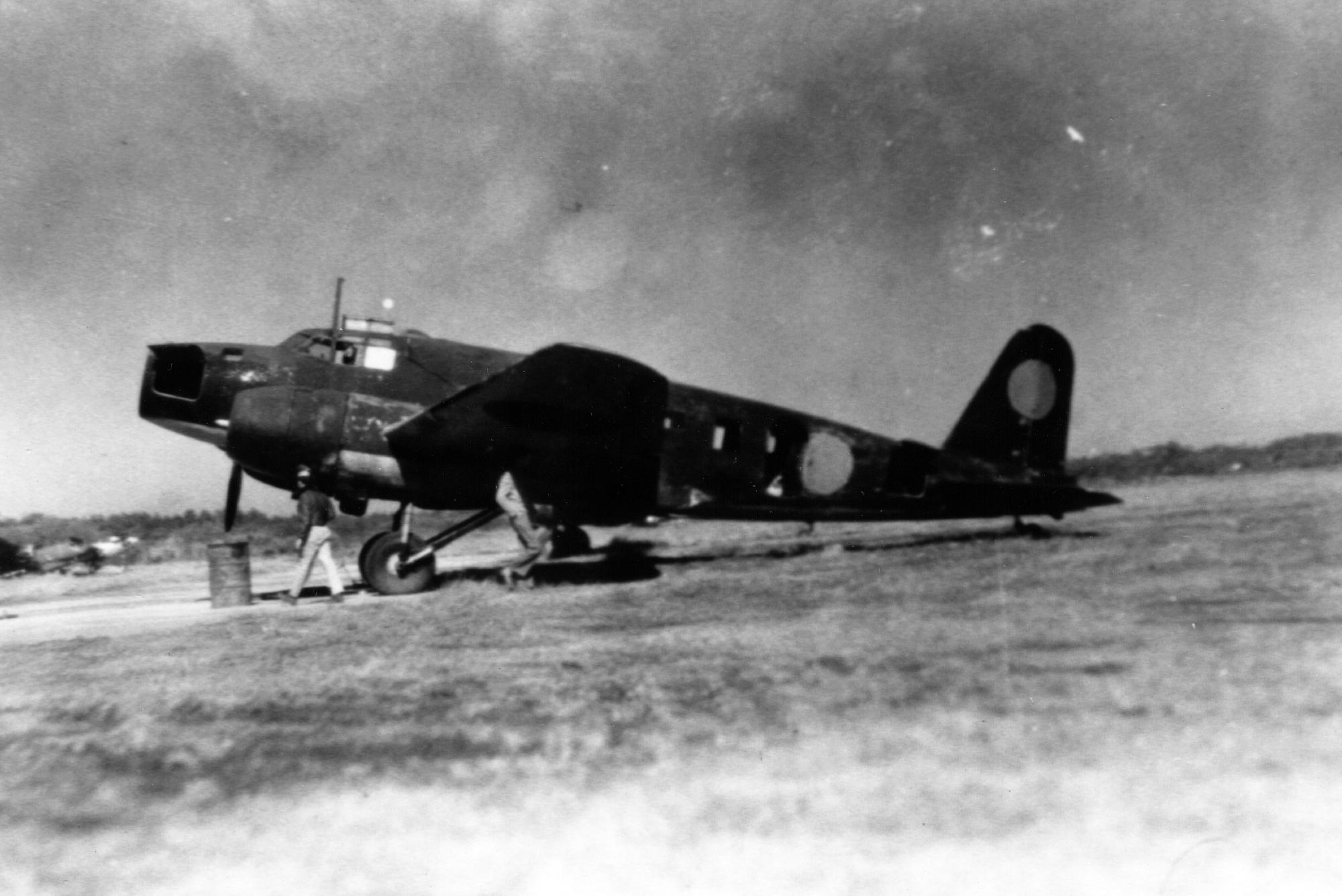
A wrecked Ki-57 on Honshu in late 1945

=== Wartime ===
Military operators

Japan

- Imperial Japanese Army Air Force
- Imperial Japanese Navy Air Service

Manchukuo

- Manchukuo Imperial Air Force

Civil operators

Japan

- Imperial Japanese Airways (Dai Nippon Koku KK)
- Asahi Shimbun
- Osaka Mainichi Shimbun
- Tyuka Koku Kaisya (in China)

Manchukuo

- Manchukuo National Airways (in Manchuria)

Reorganized National Government of China

- One MC-20 used as presidential transport

Second Philippine Republic

- One MC-20 used as presidential transport

=== Post-war ===
China

- The last Ki-57 was used as a trainer and retired in 1952.

Japan

- Imperial Japanese Airways (till October 1945)

Netherlands

- Captured aircraft, used by the KNIL.

== Accidents and incidents ==
- On 20 December 1940, an Imperial Japanese Airways MC-20-I (J-BGON, Myuko) crashed into Tokyo Bay off Chiba during CAB's test flight, killing all 13 on board including 8 CAB inspectors.
- On 21 June 1941, a Manchurian Air Transport MC-20 (M-604) crashed into the Sea of Japan, killing all 18 on board.

== Specifications (Ki-57-II) ==
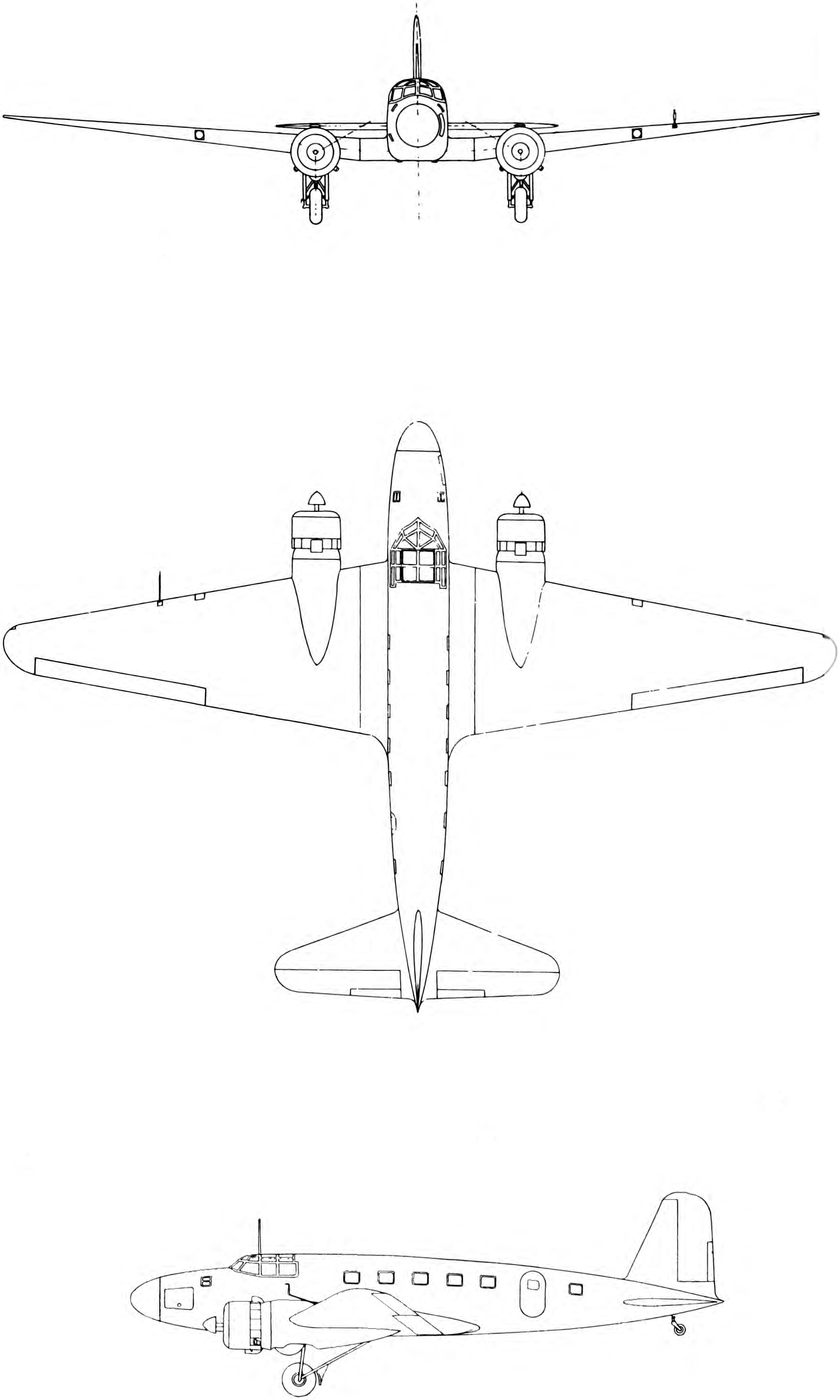
3-view drawing of the Mitsubishi Ki-57

Data from Japanese Aircraft of the Pacific War

General characteristics

- Crew: 4 (pilot, co-pilot, navigator and radio operator)
- Capacity: 11 passengers
- Length: 16.1 m (52 ft 10 in)
- Wingspan: 22.6 m (74 ft 2 in)
- Height: 4.86 m (15 ft 11 in)
- Wing area: 70.08 m^{2} (754.3 sq ft)
- Empty weight: 5,585 kg (12,313 lb)
- Gross weight: 8,173 kg (18,018 lb)
- Max takeoff weight: 9,120 kg (20,106 lb)
- Powerplant: 2 × Mitsubishi Ha-102 Zuisei 14-cylinder air-cooled radial engine, 805 kW (1,080 hp) each for take-off
- Propellers: 3-bladed variable-pitch propellers

Performance

- Maximum speed: 470 km/h (290 mph, 250 kn) at 5,800 m (19,000 ft)
- Range: 3,000 km (1,900 mi, 1,600 nmi)
- Service ceiling: 8,000 m (26,000 ft)
- Time to altitude: 5,000 m (16,000 ft) 15 minutes 45 seconds
- Wing loading: 116.6 kg/m^{2} (23.9 lb/sq ft)

== See also ==
Related development

- Mitsubishi Ki-21

Related lists

- List of aircraft of Japan during World War II
- List of aircraft of the Japanese Navy
- List of aircraft of World War II
- List of military aircraft of Japan
