= Nakajima Ki-34 =

Japanese military transport aircraft

Ki-34
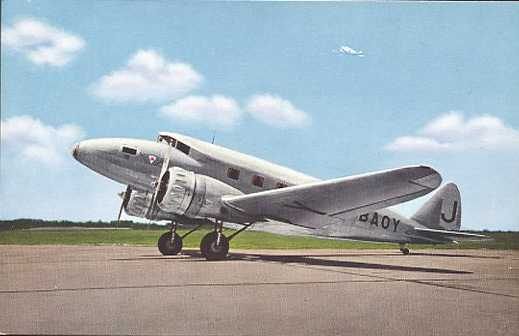
- Nakajima AT-2, civil version of the Ki-34

General information
- Type: Civil airliner/Light military transport aircraft
- Manufacturer: Nakajima Aircraft Company
- Primary users: IJA Air Force IJN Air Service; Dai Nippon Koku KK; Manchukuo National Airways
- Number built: 351

History
- Introduction date: 1937
- First flight: 12 September 1936

The Nakajima Ki-34 was a Japanese light transport of World War II. It was a twin-engine, low-wing monoplane; the undercarriage was of tailwheel type with retractable main units. During the Pacific War, the Allies assigned the type the reporting name Thora.

== Design and development ==
The Ki-34 was originally designed as a civil transport. Nakajima Aircraft Company, which had the license-production rights to the Douglas DC-2, began design work in 1935 on a smaller twin engine airliner for routes which did not have the capacity to justify use of the larger DC-2. The initial design was designated AT-1, and after numerous design iterations, flew as a prototype designated AT-2 on 12 September 1936. The design was all metal, except for the flight control surfaces, which were plywood. The wings used a multi-cell cantilever design. The prototype was fitted with 432 kW (580 hp) Nakajima Kotobuki 2-1 radial engines with fixed pitch wooden propellers, which were replaced in production models with Kotobuki-41 529 kW (710 hp) nine-cylinder radial engines, with variable pitch metal propellers.

== Operational history ==
=== Civil use (AT-2) ===
A total of 32 AT-2s were produced for Imperial Japanese Airways (Dai Nippon Koku KK) and Manchukuo National Airways, operating on scheduled routes between Tokyo and Xinjing, Tokyo and Tianjin, and within Manchukuo. These aircraft remained in operational service until the surrender of Japan in August 1945.

=== Military history (Ki-34 and L1N1) ===
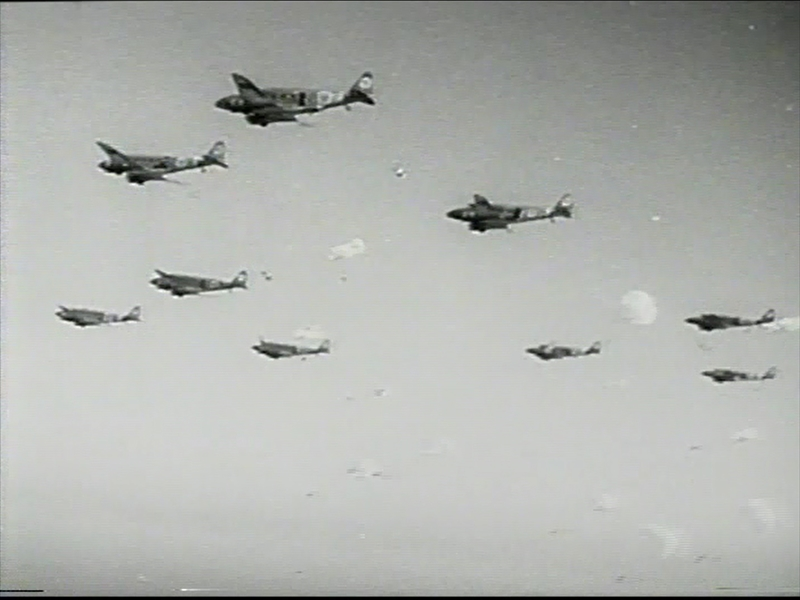
Airborne Scene from "Kato hayabusa sento-tai [Colonel Kato's Falcon Squadron]

With a high demand for increased military transport capability after the start of the Second Sino-Japanese War in 1937, the Imperial Japanese Army adapted the AT-2 design for military use by fitting with more powerful Nakajima Ha-1b radial engines and re-designating the aircraft as the Army Type 97 Transport and Ki-34. The initial 19 aircraft were produced by Nakajima Aircraft, and another 299 aircraft were subsequently produced by the Army-affiliated Tachikawa Hikoki K.K. The final airframe was delivered in 1942.

In operational service, the Ki-34 was used as a utility aircraft for liaison and communications duties, and for paratrooper training and Special Forces operations.

At a later date, some aircraft were transferred to the Imperial Japanese Navy, where they were known as the Navy Type AT-2 Transport or Nakajima L1N1. Several were also transferred to the air force of the Japanese puppet state of China-Nanjing in 1942.

== Operators ==
=== Military operators ===
China-Nanjing

- Nanjing Air Force

Japan

- Imperial Japanese Army Air Force
- Imperial Japanese Navy Air Service

=== Civil operators ===
Japan

- Imperial Japanese Airways (Dai Nippon Koku KK)

Manchukuo

- Manchukuo National Airways

Mongolia

- Mongolian People's Army Aviation operated more than 12 captured aircraft since in late September 1945.

== Specifications (Ki-34) ==
Data from Japanese Aircraft of the Pacific War, Warbirds Resource Group

General characteristics

- Crew: 3
- Capacity: 8 pax
- Length: 15.3 m (50 ft 2 in)
- Wingspan: 19.916 m (65 ft 4 in)
- Height: 4.15 m (13 ft 7 in)
- Wing area: 49.2 m^{2} (530 sq ft)
- Empty weight: 3,500 kg (7,716 lb)
- Gross weight: 5,250 kg (11,574 lb)
- Powerplant: 2 × Nakajima Kotobuki 41 or Nakajima Ha-1 9-cylinder air-cooled radial piston engines, 530 kW (710 hp) each for take-off

582 kW (780 hp) at 2,800 m (9,200 ft)

- Propellers: 2-bladed variable-pitch propellers

Performance

- Maximum speed: 360 km/h (220 mph, 190 kn) at 3,360 m (11,000 ft)
- Cruise speed: 310 km/h (190 mph, 170 kn)
- Range: 1,200 km (750 mi, 650 nmi)
- Service ceiling: 7,000 m (23,000 ft)
- Time to altitude: 3,000 m (9,800 ft) in 6 minutes 38 seconds
- Wing loading: 106.7 kg/m^{2} (21.9 lb/sq ft)
- Power/mass: 0.2017 kW/kg (0.1227 hp/lb)

== Bibliography ==
- Francillon, René J. (1979). Japanese aircraft of the Pacific War. London: Putnam. ISBN 0-370-30251-6. OCLC 6124909. (new edition 1987 by Putnam Aeronautical Books, ISBN 0-85177-801-1.)
- Soumille, Jean-Claude (September 1999). "Les avions japonais aux coleurs françaises" [Japanese Aircraft in French Colors]. Avions: Toute l'Aéronautique et Son Histoire (in French). No. 78. pp. 6–17. ISSN 1243-8650.
- Wilson, Stewart (1999). Airliners of the World. Australian Aviation. ISBN 1-875671-44-7.
