= Kokusai Ku-8 =

Japanese military transport glider

Ku-8
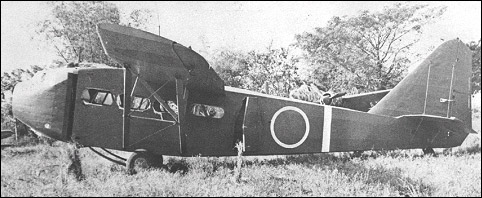
- Ku-8-II

General information
- Type: Transport glider
- National origin: Japan
- Manufacturer: Nippon Kokusai Koku Kogyo K.K
- Primary user: Imperial Japanese Army Air Service
- Number built: ~700

History
- First flight: May 22, 1943
- Developed from: Kokusai Ki-59

The Kokusai Ku-8-II (国際 ク8 四式特殊輸送機, Kokusai ku 8 yonshiki tokushū yusōki) (Kokusai Army Type 4 Special Transport Glider) was a Japanese military glider used during the Second World War. They were usually towed by Mitsubishi G3M or Mitsubishi Ki-21 aircraft.

== Design and development ==
Design of the Ku-8-II began in December 1941, and the glider was essentially a Kokusai Ki-59 with the engines and fuel tanks removed and a modified undercarriage. It was given the Allied code name Goose and later Gander. The prototype was completed on May 20, 1943 and took to the air two days later, on May 22, 1943.

A Ku-8-II version that was produced in 1944 used a tubular steel frame structure and had a hinged nose that could be opened to the side to allow loading. Also, its capacity was increased slightly to carry twenty troops. In total, approximately 700 were built. They were used operationally in the Philippines, primarily to carry supplies.

== Variants ==
- Ku-8-I:Prototypes.
- Ku-8-II:Military transport glider. Production version.

== Operators ==
Japan

- Imperial Japanese Army

== Specifications ==

Data from topsid.com:Kokusai Ku-8-II, Japanese Aircraft of the Pacific War, Fighting gliders of World War II

General characteristics

- Crew: 2
- Capacity: 20 troops, equipped; mountain howitzer with crew / 1,790 kg (3,950 lb) payload
- Length: 13.31 m (43 ft 8 in)
- Wingspan: 23.2 m (76 ft 1 in)
- Height: 2.96 m (9 ft 9 in)
- Wing area: 50.5 m^{2} (544 sq ft)
- Empty weight: 1,630 kg (3,594 lb)
- Gross weight: 3,500 kg (7,716 lb)

Performance

- Never exceed speed: 240 km/h (150 mph, 130 kn)
- Maximum glide ratio: 15.9:1
- Maximum towing speed: 224 km/h (139 mph; 121 kn)

== See also ==
Related lists

- List of aircraft of World War II
