= Kokusai Ki-59 =

Japanese light transport aircraft

Ki-59
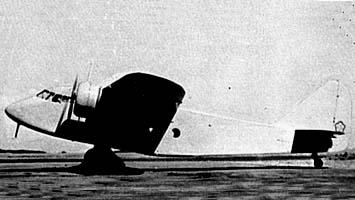
- A Kokusai Ki-59 light personnel transport.

General information
- Type: Light transport monoplane
- Manufacturer: Nippon Kokusai Koku Kogyo K.K
- Primary user: Imperial Japanese Army Air Force
- Number built: 59

History
- First flight: 1941
- Variant: Kokusai Ku-8

The Kokusai Ki-59 (一式輸送機, Isshiki-yusōki) was an early 1940s light transport monoplane built by Nippon Kokusai Koku Kogyo K.K for the Imperial Japanese Army as a development of the Teradako-ken TK-3, which had first flown in 1938.

== Development ==
The Teradako-ken TK-3 was a prototype, eight-to-ten passenger light transport monoplane built by Nippon Koku Kogyo Kabushiki Kaisha as a short-range transport for civil use at the request of Imperial Japanese Airways to replace its aging fleet of Airspeed Envoys and Fokker Super Universals. The first of two prototypes flew in June 1938, but they were unable to meet the required performance requirements, and the project was cancelled. In 1939, the Imperial Japanese Army revived the project to meet its urgent requirement for a light transport and liaison aircraft, and they instructed Nippon to develop the design as the Ki-59.

The Ki-59 was a high-wing, cantilever monoplane with a fixed tailwheel landing gear and conventional single vertical tail surfaces. It was powered by two 450 hp (336 kW) Hitachi Ha-13a radial engines, and other modifications to the design were made to meet Army requirements. The Ki-59 was ordered into production in 1941 with the designation Army Type 1 Transport, and an additional fifty-nine units were produced. After the start of World War II, the aircraft was given the Allied reporting name Theresa. Despite the more powerful engines and modifications sponsored by the Japanese Army, the Ki-59 remained a poor performer and saw little service before being replaced by the more capable Tachikawa Ki-54. A small number were transferred to Manchukuo National Airways.

Near the end of 1941, one Ki-59 was modified into a glider with the removal of the engines and the landing gear replaced by underfuselage skids. It was designated the Ku-8-I or Army Experimental Glider. This was further developed as the Ku-8-II or Army Type 4 Large Transport Glider, which became the only operationally-used Japanese assault glider. It was named Gander by the Allies.

== Variants ==
TK-3
Prototype civil transport with two 640 hp (477 kW) Nakajima Kotobuki 3 radial engines, two built.
Ki-59 (Army Type 1 Transport) ("Theresa")
Production military transport with two 450 hp (336 kW) Hitachi Ha-13a radial engines, 59 built.
Ku-8-I (Army Experimental Glider)
Experimental conversion to glider configuration.
Ku-8-II (Army Type 4 Large Transport Glider) ("Gander")
Assault-glider variant.

== Operators ==
Japan

- Imperial Japanese Army Air Force

Manchukuo

- Manchukuo National Airways

== Specifications (Ki-59) ==

Data from Japanese Aircraft of the Pacific War

General characteristics

- Crew: 3
- Capacity: Eight passengers
- Length: 12.5 m (41 ft 0.13 in)
- Wingspan: 17 m (55 ft 9.25 in)
- Height: 3.05 m (10 ft 0 in)
- Wing area: 38.4 m^{2} (413 sq ft)
- Empty weight: 2,880 kg (6,349 lb)
- Gross weight: 4,120 kg (9,083 lb)
- Powerplant: 2 × Hitachi Ha-13a radial engine , 336 kW (450 hp) each

Performance

- Cruise speed: 300 km/h (186 mph, 162 kn)
- Range: 800 km (497 mi, 432 nmi)

Armament

- none.

== See also ==
Related lists

- List of aircraft of World War II
- List of military aircraft of Japan
