= Nakajima Ki-4 =

Japanese bi-plane reconisense aircraft

Ki-4
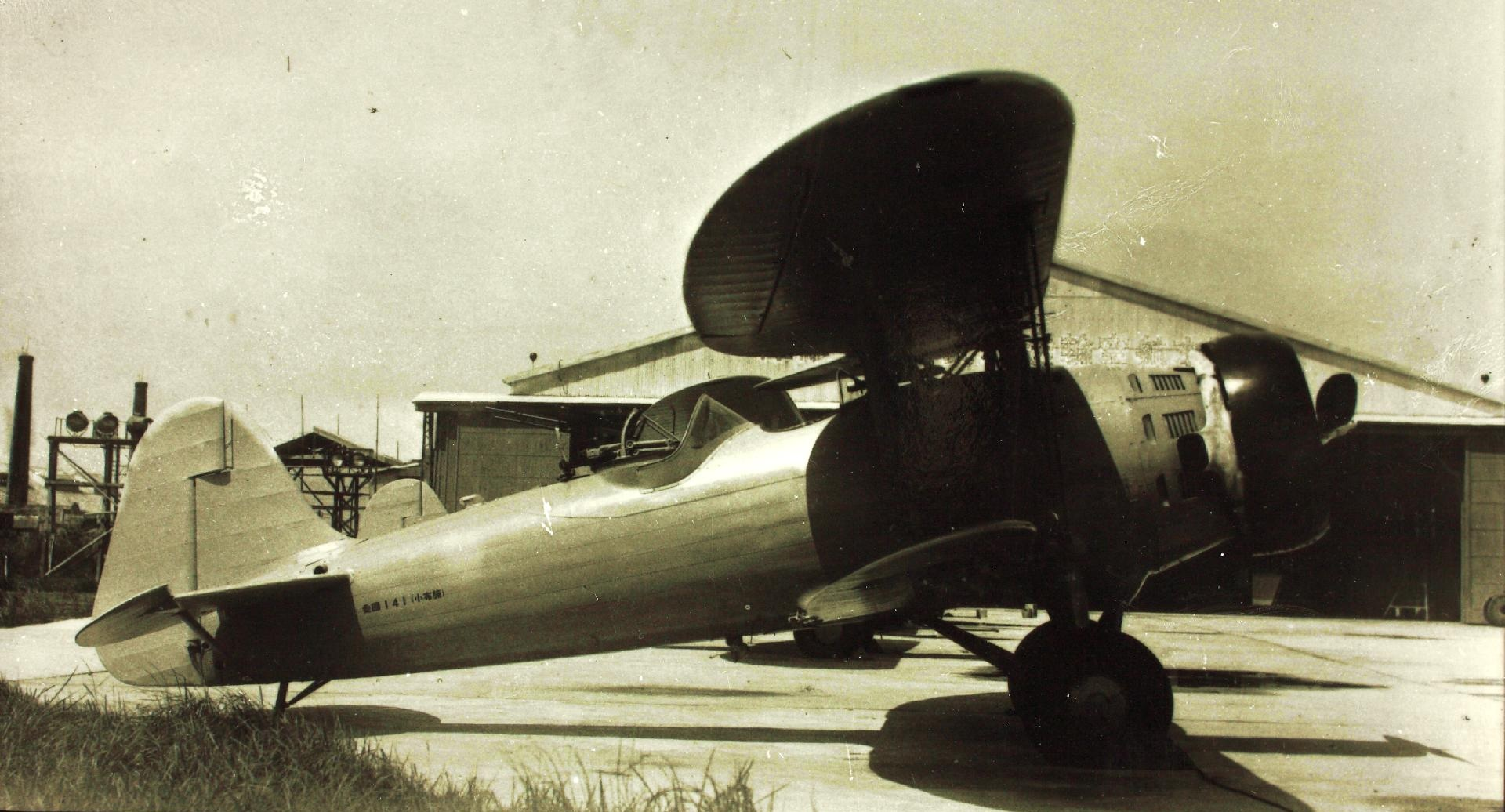
- Nakajima Ki-4 (Army Type 94 Reconnaissance aircraft)

General information
- Type: Reconnaissance, Light Ground-Attack, Trainer, Target Tug
- Manufacturer: Nakajima Aircraft Company
- Primary users: IJA Air Force Manchukuo Air Force

History
- Manufactured: 516
- Introduction date: 1934
- First flight: 1933
- Retired: 1943

The Nakajima Ki-4 Kyūyon-shiki teisatsuki (九四式偵察機) was the last biplane reconnaissance aircraft of the Japanese Imperial Army. It saw combat service in Manchukuo and in North China during the early stages of the Second Sino-Japanese War.

== Design and development ==
The Ki-4 was initially produced by Nakajima in response to a 1931 specification for a high-performance reconnaissance aircraft that could also be used in the light ground support role. After evaluating aircraft from Europe and the United States, the Imperial Japanese Army Air Force selected a new design by the domestic Nakajima Aircraft Company. The prototype was test flown in May 1934.

The Nakajima Ki-4 was a biplane design with staggered wings and fixed, divided landing gear. It was powered by one 477 kW (640 hp) Nakajima Ha-8, nine-cylinder, air-cooled radial engine. Maximum speed was 300 km/h (190 mph), and maximum take-off weight was 2,500 kg (5,500 lb). It was armed with up to four 7.7 mm (0.303 in) machine guns, two fixed to fire forward, synchronized with the propeller, and one or two more mounted dorsally on a flexible mount. The maximum bomb load was 50 kg (110 lb).

A total of 516 units were produced, 333 by Nakajima between March 1934 and February 1939, fifty-seven under license by Tachikawa Aircraft Company Ltd, and another 126 by Manshū in Manchukuo (Manchuria).

== Operational history ==
The first Ki-4s began equipping Imperial Japanese Army Air Force units in 1935 and were an active part of Japanese fighter squadrons for a number of years thereafter. The Ki-4s saw substantial service in the early stages of the Second Sino-Japanese War from 1938. They also functioned as light ground-attack aircraft in the support of advancing Japanese ground troops. However, these biplanes were vulnerable to even the oldest and slowest moving enemy fighters. By the time of the entry of Japan into World War II, the Ki-4s were regarded as obsolete. A number were still retained for use in the supply and liaison role from 1941, and others were transferred to the Manchukuo Air Force. Those that had not been lost in service served briefly as elementary trainers or target tugs before being scrapped. All of the Ki-4s were removed from active service by 1943.

Two Ki-4s were tested as seaplanes, one with twin floats and the other with one main and two stabilizing floats, but neither version was placed into production.

== Variants ==
- Ki-4 (Army Type 94 Reconnaissance Aircraft)

== Operators ==
Japan

- Imperial Japanese Army Air Force

Manchukuo

- Manchukuo Air Force

== Specifications (Ki-4) ==
Data from Japanese Aircraft, 1910–1941

General characteristics

- Crew: 2
- Length: 7.73 m (25 ft 4 in)
- Wingspan: 12 m (39 ft 4 in)
- Height: 3.5 m (11 ft 6 in)
- Wing area: 29.7 m^{2} (320 sq ft)
- Empty weight: 1,664 kg (3,668 lb)
- Gross weight: 2,474 kg (5,454 lb)
- Powerplant: 1 × Nakajima Ha-8 ("Army Type 94 550hp Air Cooled Radial") 9-cylinder air-cooled radial piston engine, 450 kW (600 hp) for take-off

480 kW (640 hp) at 4,000 m (13,000 ft)

- Propellers: 2-bladed controllable-pitch metal propeller

Performance

- Maximum speed: 153 km/h (95 mph, 83 kn) at 2,400 m (7,900 ft)
- Service ceiling: 8,000 m (26,000 ft)
- Time to altitude: 3,000 m (9,800 ft) in 9 minutes
- Wing loading: 82.5 kg/m^{2} (16.9 lb/sq ft)
- Power/mass: 0.18 kW/kg (0.11 hp/lb)

Armament

- Guns: Up to 4 × 7.7 mm (0.303 in) machine guns (2 fixed-forward firing synchronized and 1 or 2 on a flexible mount in the rear cockpit)
- Bombs: 50 kg (110 lb)

== See also ==
- List of military aircraft of Japan
