= Nakajima C3N =

1930s Japanese reconnaissance aircraft prototype

C3N

General information
- Type: Carrier-based reconnaissance aircraft
- National origin: Japan
- Manufacturer: Nakajima Aircraft Company
- Primary user: Imperial Japanese Navy
- Number built: 2

History
- Introduction date: 1937
- First flight: 1936

The Nakajima C3N-1 (also designated Type 97 Carrier Reconnaissance Aircraft) was a prototype Japanese carrier-based reconnaissance aircraft of the 1930s. It was a single-engine monoplane with a fixed undercarriage. Although only two examples were built, they were both used operationally, carrying out land-based reconnaissance missions during the Second Sino-Japanese War.

== Development ==
In 1935, the Nakajima Aircraft Company submitted a design to meet an Imperial Japanese Navy Air Service requirement for a carrier based-reconnaissance aircraft. The design, designated Type S by Nakajima, had a great deal in common with the Nakajima B5N torpedo-bomber that was being developed in parallel. The Type S was a low-winged, single-engined monoplane of all metal construction with upward folding wings for ease of stowage aboard carriers. Unlike the B5N, its undercarriage was of fixed tailwheel type with spatted main wheels. Power was by the same Nakajima Hikari radial engine used by early B5Ns. A crew of three were accommodated under a long canopy, with a single 7.7 mm machine gun operated by a gunner and a second fixed forward-firing gun aimed by the pilot.

The first of two prototypes was completed in October 1936. After testing and completing carrier qualification, the type was officially adopted as the Type 97 Carrier Reconnaissance Aircraft, with the short designation of C3N-1. No production followed, however, as the B5N was considered adequate in the reconnaissance role.

== Operational history ==
The two C3N-1s were sent to China for tactical evaluation in 1937, during the early months of the Second Sino-Japanese War, being used operationally for land based reconnaissance missions in the Hankou and Shanghai regions.

== Specifications (C3N) ==
Data from Japanese Aircraft 1910-41

General characteristics

- Crew: 3
- Length: 10 m (32 ft 10 in)
- Wingspan: 13.95 m (45 ft 9 in)
- Wing area: 30 m^{2} (320 sq ft)
- Empty weight: 1,805 kg (3,979 lb)
- Gross weight: 3,000 kg (6,614 lb)
- Powerplant: 1 × Nakajima Hikari 2 9-cylinder air-cooled radial piston engine, 560–630 kW (750–840 hp)

Performance

- Maximum speed: 387 km/h (240 mph, 209 kn)
- Range: 2,278 km (1,415 mi, 1,230 nmi)
- Service ceiling: 6,670 m (21,880 ft)
- Wing loading: 100 kg/m^{2} (20 lb/sq ft)
- Power/mass: 0.2081 kW/kg (0.1266 hp/lb)

Armament

- Guns: 1× fixed forward firing 7.7mm machine gun and one flexibly mounted machine gun in rear cockpit

== See also ==
Related development

- Nakajima B5N

Related lists

- List of military aircraft of Japan
