= Nakajima A4N =

Japanese carrier-based fighter aircraft

A4N
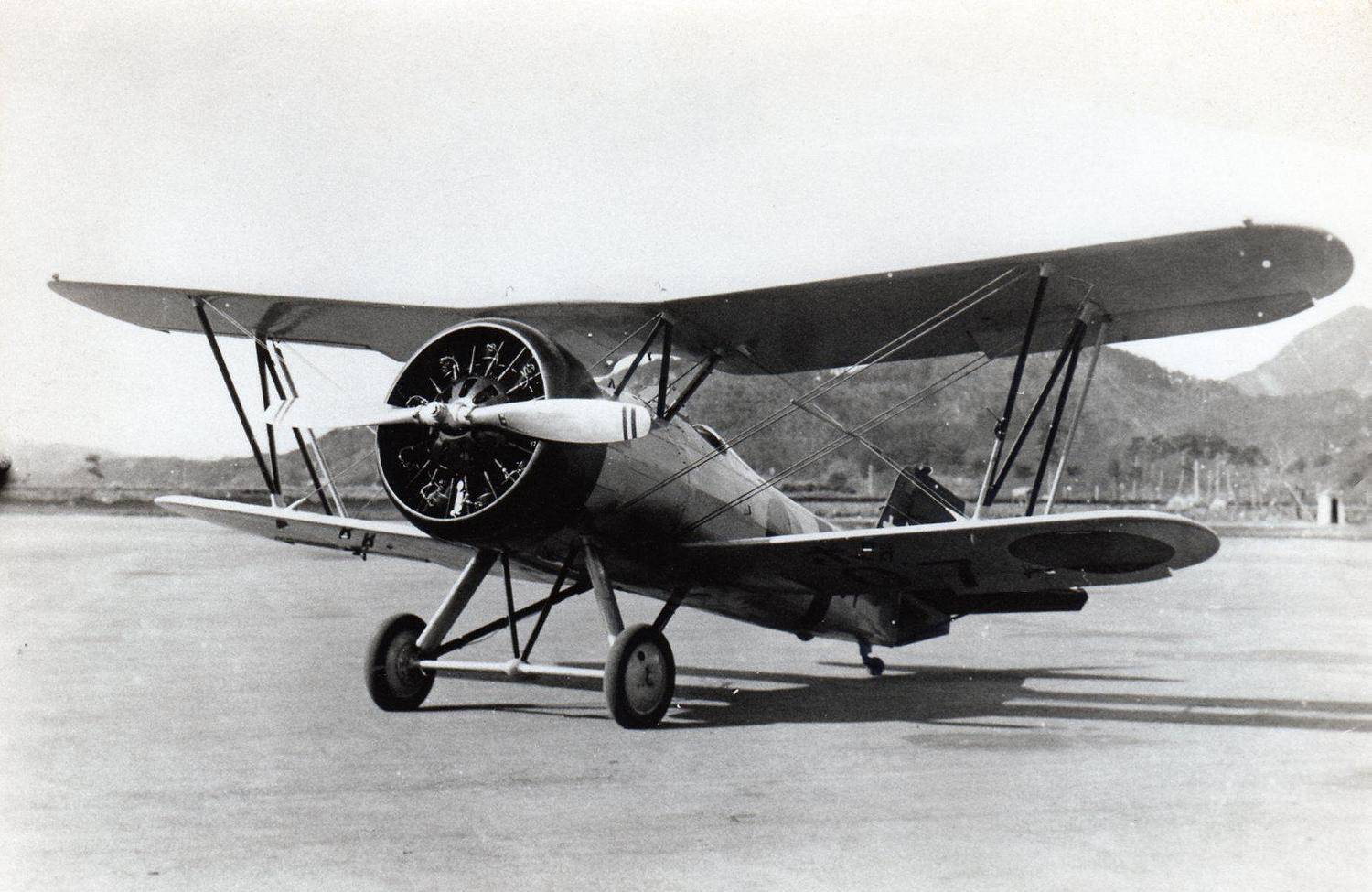

General information
- Type: Fighter aircraft
- National origin: Japan
- Manufacturer: Nakajima Aircraft Company
- Primary user: Imperial Japanese Navy Air Service
- Number built: 221

History
- Manufactured: 1935-1940
- Introduction date: January 1936
- First flight: Autumn 1934
- Developed from: Nakajima A2N

The Nakajima A4N was a carrier-based fighter used by the Imperial Japanese Navy, and the last biplane designed by Nakajima. The first prototype was completed in 1934, but, due to engine trouble, the aircraft did not see service until 1936. Given the Nakajima internal designation Nakajima YM, but the Japanese Navy designation was Navy Type 95 Carrier Fighter. A total of 221 were built. It saw combat in the Second Sino-Japanese War in the late 1930s.

== Design and development ==
The A4N was a further development of and replacement for the Nakajima A2N, which was a private venture by Nakajima. The A4N was powered by the Nakajima Hikari 1 nine-cylinder air-cooled radial piston engine, coupled to a Hamilton two blade metal propeller, and it was armed with 7.7 mm caliber Type 97 machine guns. The aircraft was flown by one pilot.

In 1935, there was a combat trial of many aircraft, including the A4N, prototypes, and older aircraft, in which the A5M and Ki 10 prototype were considered the most maneuverable.

The Nakajima A4N1 was succeeded by the Mitsubishi A5M Type 96, a monoplane fighter.

== Service ==
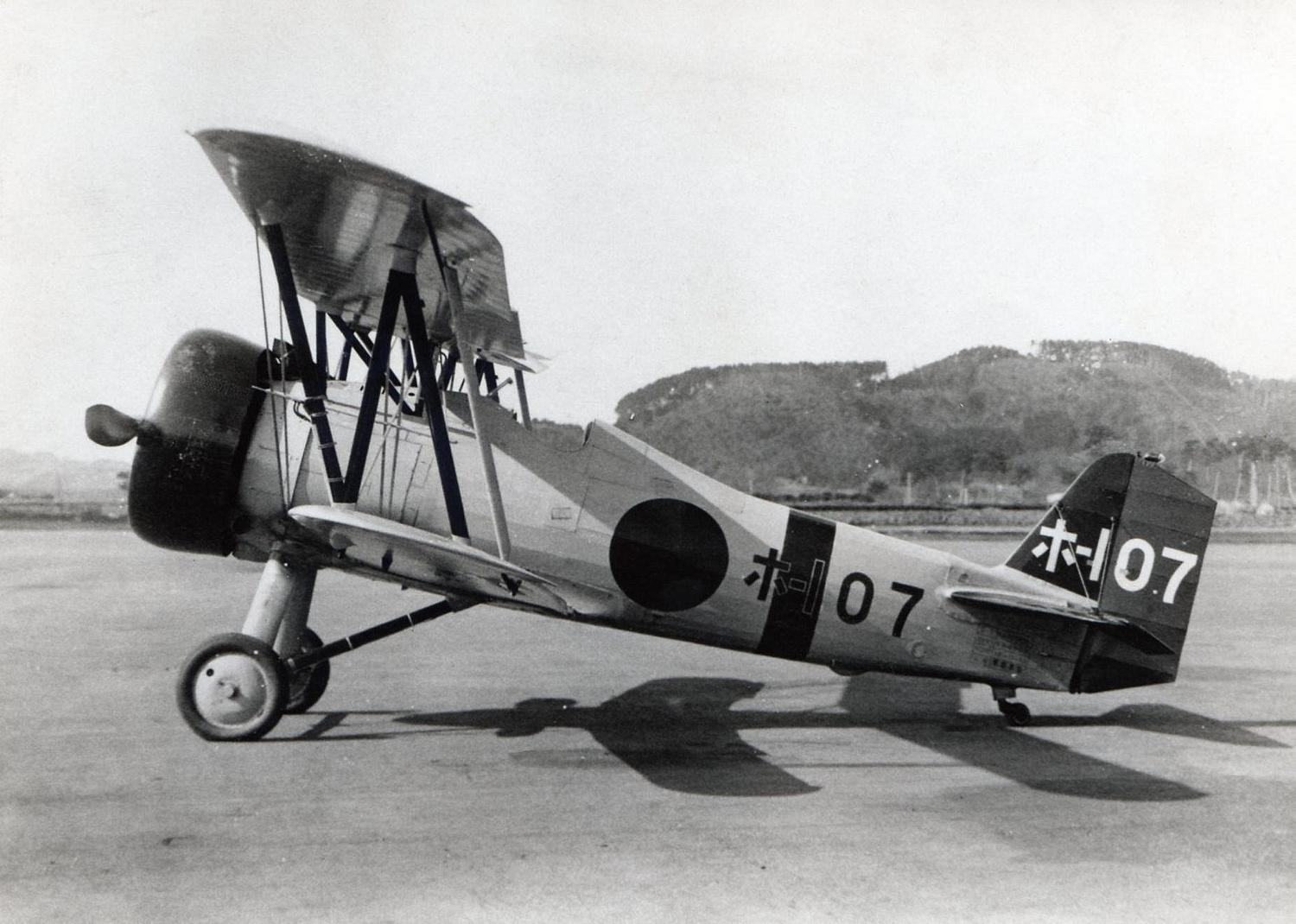
Nakajima A4N

The A4N was one of the aircraft types involved in the Panay incident, in which Japanese forces sunk the river gunboat USS Panay. Three Yokosuka B4Y Type 96 bombers and nine Nakajima A4N Type 95 fighters attacked the boat. In addition to bombing Panay, they also strafed the lifeboat evacuating wounded to shore. USS Panay was evacuating nationals and foreigners, as Japanese aircraft were there in Shanghai because of the Sino-Japanese war, with the incident being resolved diplomatically.

In the Second Sino-Japanese War, A4Ns were used to escort G3M medium bombers starting in August, after they proved vulnerable to the Chinese Air Force.

== Specifications (A4N1) ==
Data from Japanese Aircraft, 1910–1941

General characteristics

- Crew: 1
- Length: 6.64 m (21 ft 9 in)
- Wingspan: 10 m (32 ft 10 in)
- Height: 3.07 m (10 ft 1 in)
- Wing area: 22.89 m^{2} (246.4 sq ft)
- Empty weight: 1,276 kg (2,813 lb)
- Gross weight: 1,760 kg (3,880 lb)
- Fuel capacity: 600 L (132.0 imp gal; 158.5 US gal)
- Powerplant: 1 × Nakajima Hikari 1 9-cylinder air-cooled radial piston engine, 500 kW (670 hp) to 540 kW (730 hp)
- Propellers: 2-bladed Hamilton Standard fixed-pitch metal propeller

Performance

- Maximum speed: 352 km/h (219 mph, 190 kn) at 3,200 m (10,500 ft)
- Cruise speed: 233 km/h (145 mph, 126 kn)
- Range: 846 km (526 mi, 457 nmi)
- Service ceiling: 7,740 m (25,390 ft)
- Time to altitude: 3,000 m (9,800 ft) in 3 minutes 30 seconds
- Wing loading: 76.9 kg/m^{2} (15.8 lb/sq ft)
- Power/mass: 0.2884 kW/kg (0.1754 hp/lb)

Armament

- Guns: 2 × fixed, forward-firing 7.7 mm (0.303 in) Type 97 machine guns
- Bombs: 2 × 30 kg (66 lb) or 2 × 60 kg (130 lb) bombs

== See also ==
Related development

- Nakajima A2N

Aircraft of comparable role, configuration, and era

- Curtiss BF2C Goshawk
- Gloster Gladiator
- Polikarpov I-15

Related lists

- List of aircraft of Japan during World War II
- List of military aircraft of Japan
