= Manchuria Aviation Company =

Manchuria Aviation Company 滿洲航空株式會社 Mǎnzhōu Hángkōng Zhūshì Huìshè Manshū Kōkū Kabushiki-gaisha
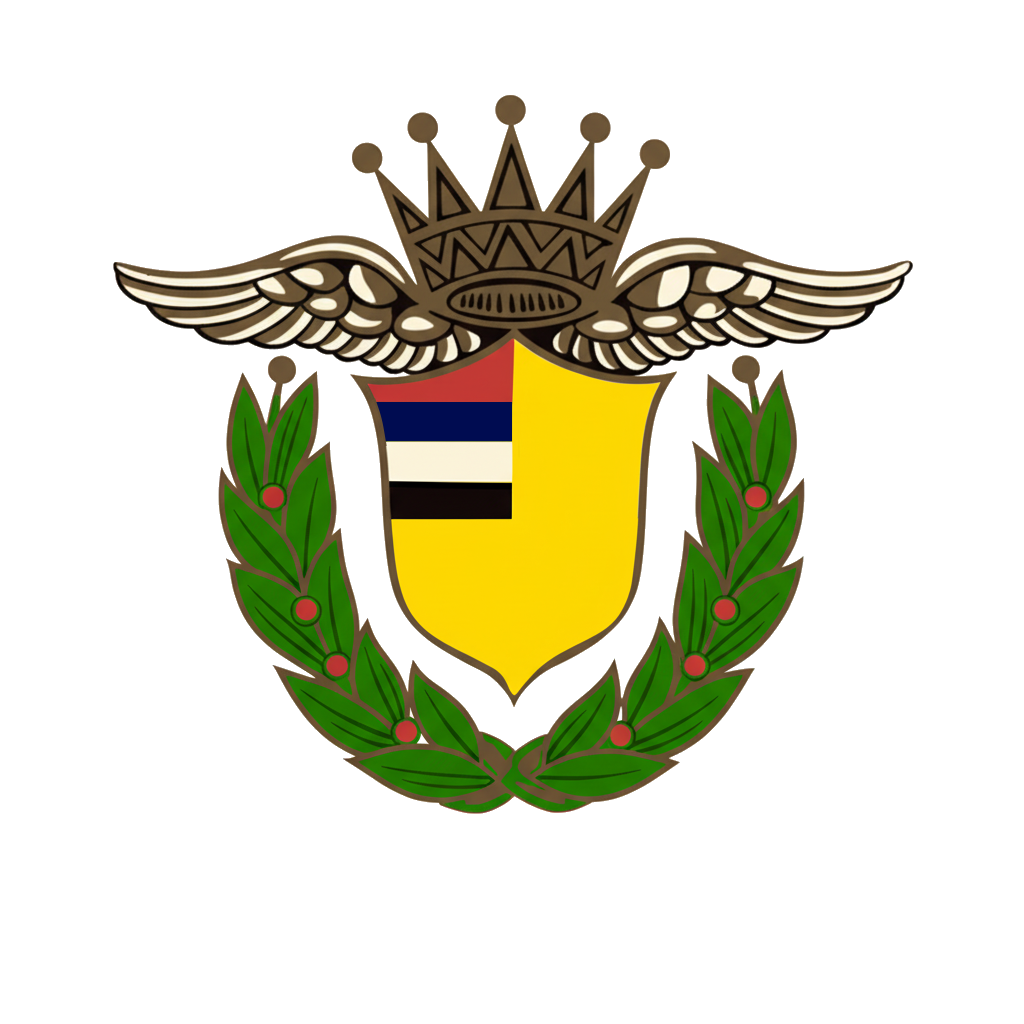
IATA	ICAO	Call sign
RH	N/A	?
- Founded: 26 September 1931; 94 years ago Fengtian, Manchukuo
- Ceased operations: 15 August 1945; 80 years ago
- Hubs: Xinjing; Harbin
- Focus cities: Mukden
- Destinations: Domestic, Empire of Japan
- Parent company: Government of Manchukuo; South Manchuria Railway; Sumitomo Group
- Headquarters: Mukden, Manchukuo

Manchukuo Air Transport Company roundel.

Manchuria Aviation Company (traditional Chinese/Kyūjitai: 滿洲航空株式會社; simplified Chinese: 满州航空株式会社; Shinjitai: 満州航空株式会社; Hanyu Pinyin: Mǎnzhōu Hángkōng Zhūshì Huìshè; Wade–Giles: Man^{3}-chou^{1} Hang^{2}-k'ung^{1} Chu^{1}-shih^{4} Hui^{4}-she^{4} Japanese Hepburn: Manshū Kōkū Kabushiki-gaisha, "MKKK") was the national airline of Manchukuo.

Manchuria Aviation Company was established on 26 September 1931 in Fengtian by order of the Japanese Kwantung Army, out of the Manchurian branch office of Japan Air Transport, the forerunner of Imperial Japanese Airways. It officially adopted the name Manchuria Aviation Company on the proclamation of the independence of Manchukuo. Major shareholders were the Manchukuo government, the South Manchurian Railway Company and the Sumitomo zaibatsu.

From the beginning, the Manchuria Aviation Company was a paramilitary airline, whose primary purpose was to provide transport and logistical support for the military, and for the transport of mail. Civilian passengers were carried and charter operations undertaken on a lower priority.

In 1936, an "Independent Volunteer Battalion" of the MKKK consisting of 13 aircraft fought on the side of the Inner Mongolian Army against Kuomintang-held Suiyuan.

The airline had a "hub" in Xinjing and was linked by regular flight routes from Harbin, Shamussi (Jiamusi), Jilin, Mukden, Andong, Jinzhou, Chengde, Qiqihar, Hailar, and the Kwantung Leased Territory and Korea areas, for connections with Imperial Japanese Airways (Dai Nippon Koku KK) to Japan itself or foreign routes.

In May 1937, MAC established a subsidiary, Kokusai Koku, to open a long-distance route between Hsinking and Berlin using two German Heinkel He 116 aircraft, in bilateral partnership with Lufthansa. The route was planned to operate through Central Asia with stops in Xinjiang, Kabul, Baghdad, and Rhodes. However, the outbreak of war with China made the route unfeasible. The He 116s, named Nogi and Togo, were ultimately used on the Hsinking-Tokyo route.

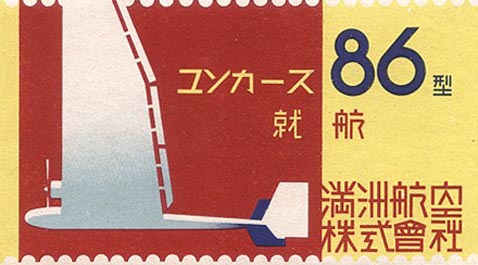
Manchukuo Airlines luggage tag advertising the Ju-86

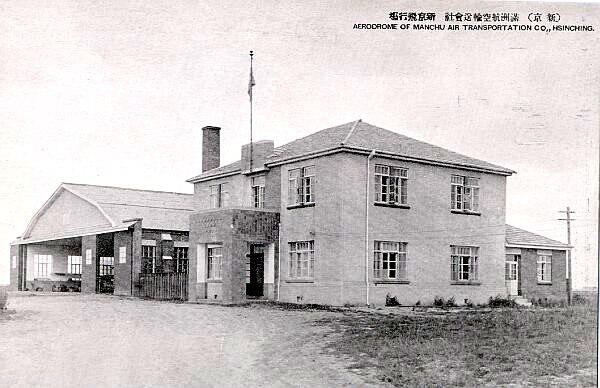
Xinjing Airport

The repair shops of the MKKK produced copies of the Fokker Super Universal (Nakajima Ki-6) and the De Havilland DH.80 "Pussmoth."

The Manchuria Aviation Company ceased operations in August 1945 during the Soviet invasion of Manchuria. However, wartime fuel and equipment shortages had previously curtailed its operations considerably. Remaining aircraft, goods and equipment were confiscated, to the benefit of the Soviet Union and Chinese Communist Party, after the conflict.

== Fleet ==
- 30x Manshū MT-1 Hayabusa airliner
- 27x de Havilland DH.80 Pussmoth
- 15x Messerschmitt Bf 108A/B Taifun liaison aircraft
- 12x Nakajima AT-2 Thora transports
- 10x Mitsubishi MC-20 Topsy transports
- 10x Junkers Ju 86Z-1 transports/bombers
- 10x Junkers Ju 86Z-2 transports/bombers
- 2x Heinkel He 116A communications planes
- 2x Fokker F.VIIb-3m/M transports
- 1x Tachikawa Ki-54 Hickory transport
- 1x de Havilland DH.85 Leopardmoth
- 1x General Aviation GA-43 transport
- ?x Tachikawa Type LO Thelma transport (license build Lockheed Model 14-38 Super Electra)
- ?x Airspeed Envoy (license build Mitsubishi Type Hinazuru transport)
- ?x Manshū Super Universal (license built Fokker Super Universal)
- ?x Kawasaki Ki-56 Thalia transport
- ?x Kokusai Ki-59 transport

== Accidents and incidents ==
- On June 20, 1941, Mitsubishi MC-20 (registration M-604) crashed in the Sea of Japan, killing all 18 on board.
