= Nakajima Hikari =

1930s Japanese piston aircraft engine

Hikari
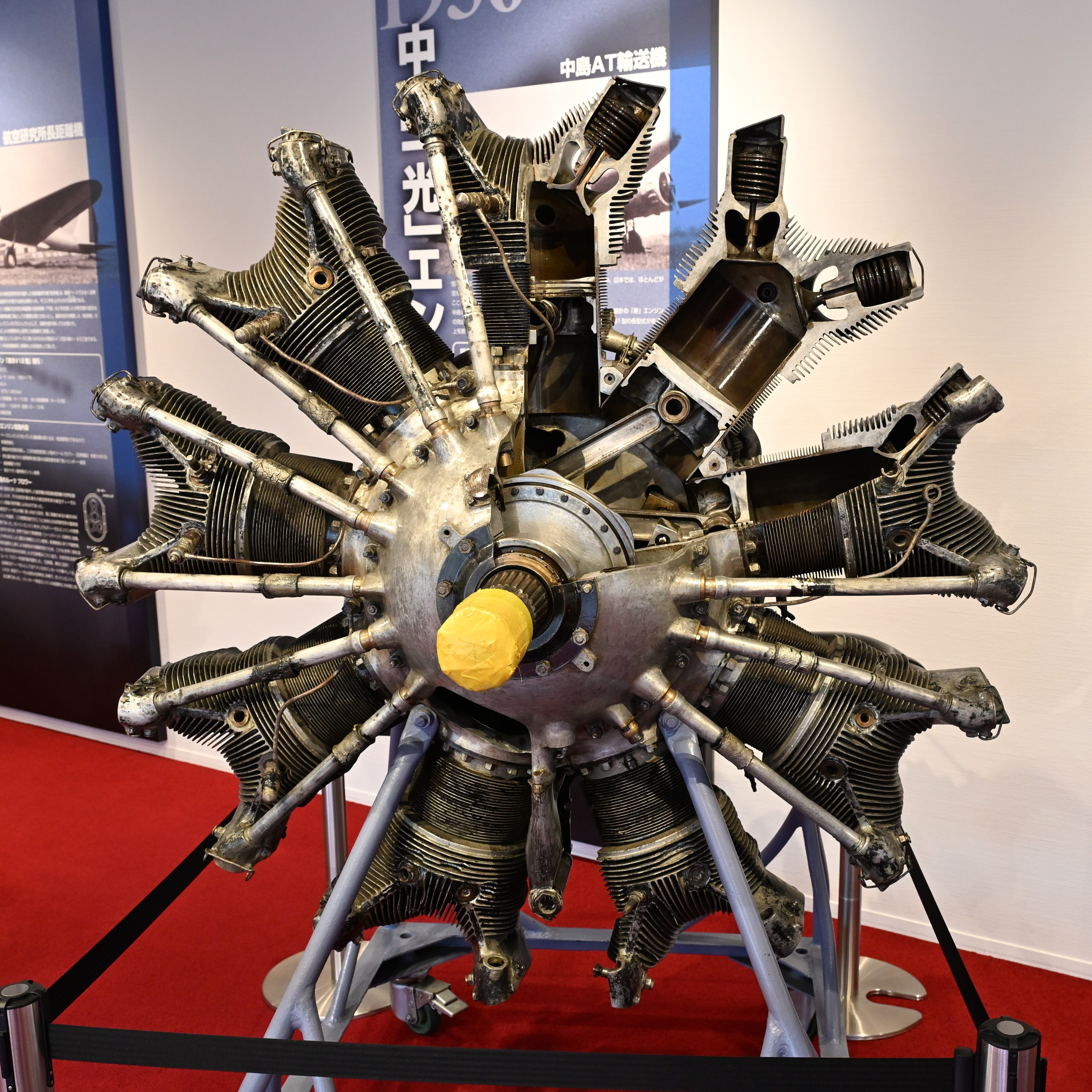
- Nakajima Hikari 3
- Type: Piston aircraft engine
- Manufacturer: Nakajima Aircraft Company
- Major applications: Aichi D1A
- Developed from: Nakajima Kotobuki

The Nakajima Hikari (Japanese: 光 "Light") was a nine-cylinder, air-cooled, radial aircraft engine developed in Japan for Navy use during World War II by the Nakajima Aircraft Company. It was a development of the Nakajima Kotobuki and Wright Cyclone. In Army use it was known as the Ha8.

== Variants ==
Hikari 1
820 hp (610 kW)
Hikari 1 kai
670–730 hp (500–540 kW)
Hikari 2
750–840 hp (560–630 kW)
Hikari 3
770 hp (570 kW)

== Applications ==
- Aichi D1A2
- Aichi D3A (first prototype)
- Kawasaki Ki-45 (first prototype)
- Mitsubishi F1M1
- Nakajima A4N
- Nakajima B5N1
- Nakajima C3N
- Yokosuka B4Y (B4Y1 fourth plane onward)

== Specifications ==
=== General characteristics ===
- Type: 9-cylinder air-cooled radial aircraft piston engine
- Bore: 160 mm (6.3 in)
- Stroke: 180 mm (7.1 in)
- Displacement: 32.57 L (1,988 cu in)
- Diameter: 1.375 mm

=== Components ===
- Cooling system: Air-cooled

=== Performance ===
- Power output: 820 hp (610 kW)

== See also ==
Related development

- Nakajima Kotobuki

Related lists

- List of aircraft engines
