= Seoul Airport =

Seoul Airport may refer to one of the following airports or relevant facilities serving Seoul, South Korea:

- Incheon International Airport (IATA: ICN, ICAO: RKSI), the long-haul international hub
- Gimpo International Airport (IATA: GMP, ICAO: RKSS), the domestic hub which also serves some short-haul international routes
- Seoul Air Base (IATA: SSN, ICAO: RKSM), a military airbase
- Seoul Station City Airport Terminal, a in-town check-in service at Seoul Station
- Yeouido Airport, a former airport served from 1916 to 1971
