= 1938 Tokyo mid-air collision =

Aviation incident in Japan, 1938

Accident
- Date: 24 August 1938
- Summary: Mid-air collision
- Site: Ōmori, Ōta, Japan
- Total fatalities: Disputed
- Total survivors: 0

First aircraft
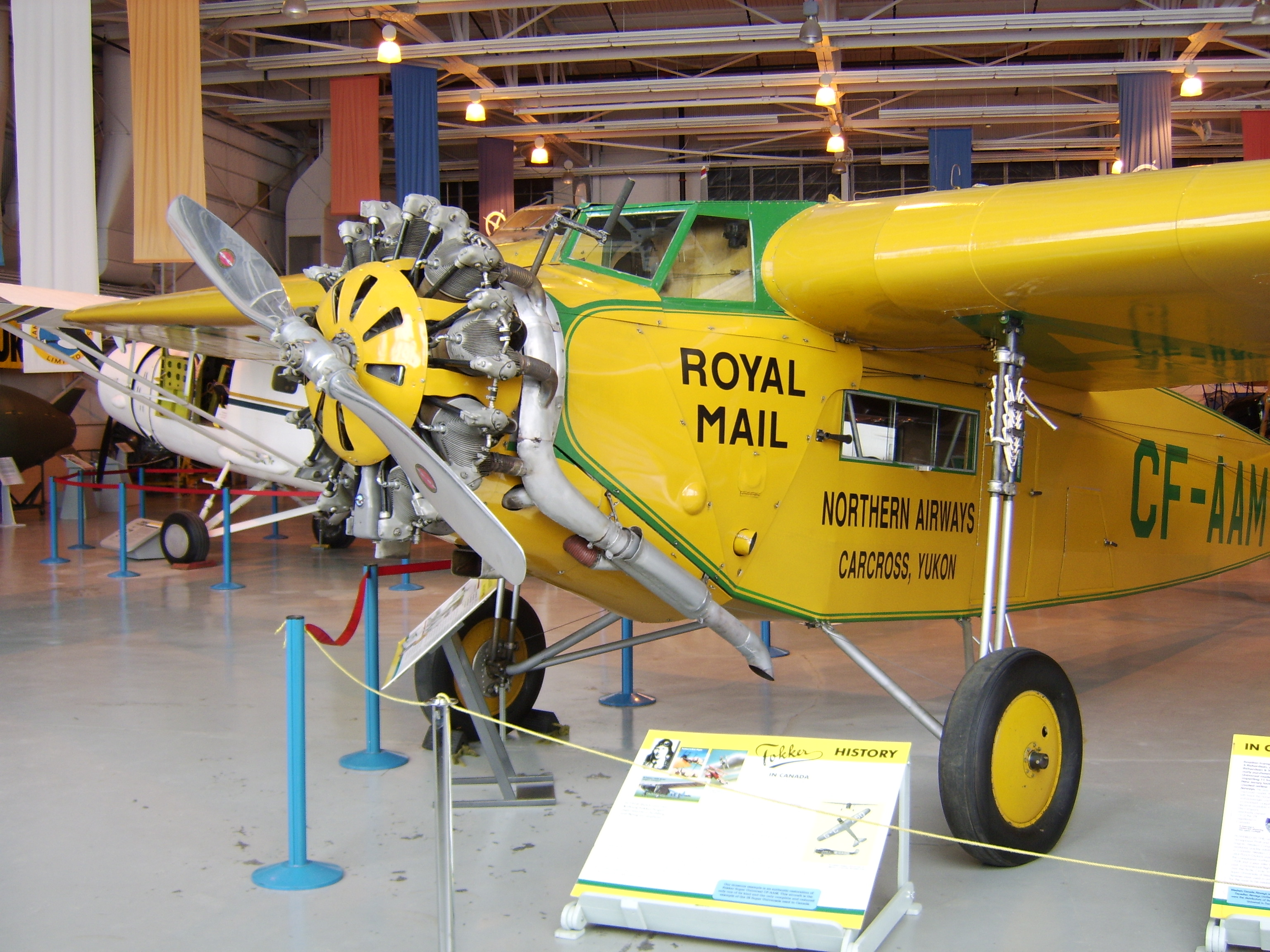
- A Fokker Super Universal, similar to the aircraft involved.
- Type: Fokker Super Universal
- Operator: Japan Air Transport
- Registration: J-BJDO
- Destination: Haneda Airport
- Passengers: 0
- Crew: 3
- Fatalities: 3
- Survivors: 0

Second aircraft
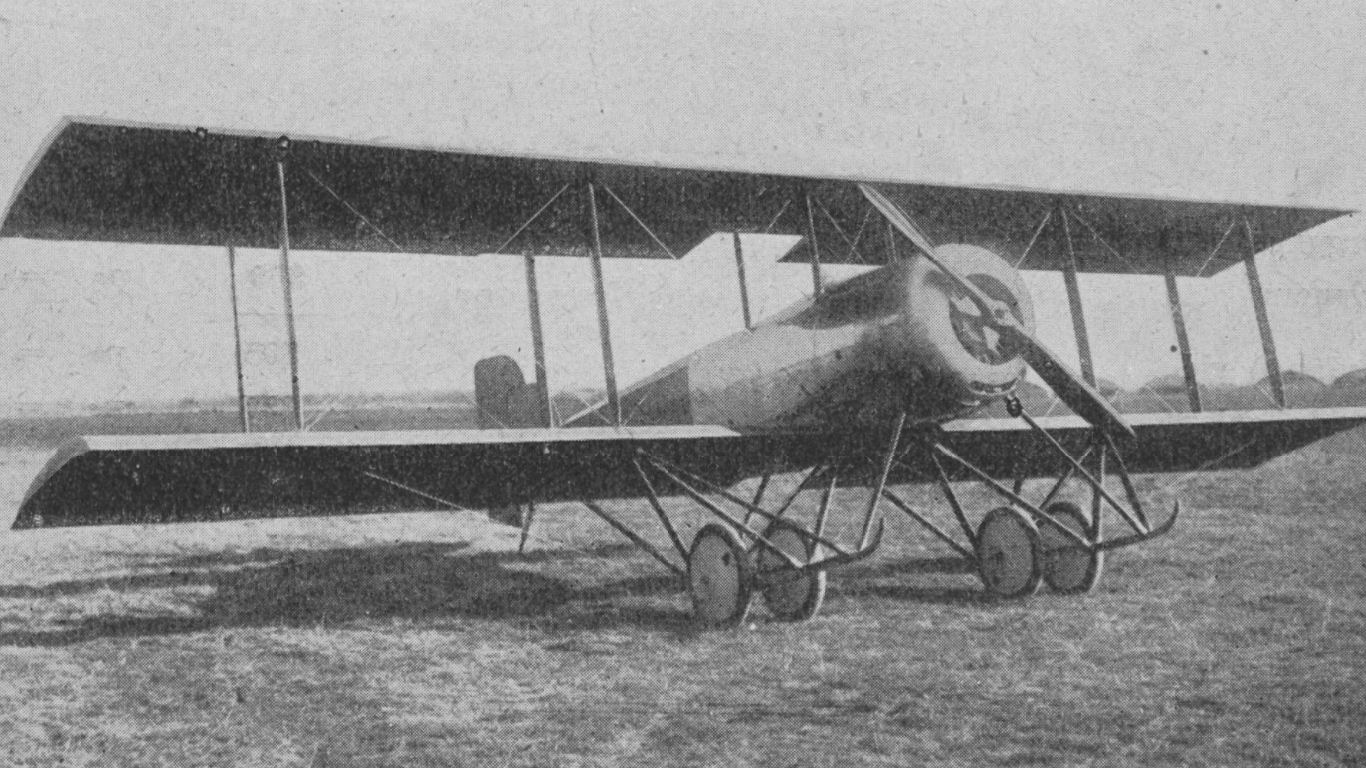
- A Hanriot HD.14, similar to the one involved
- Type: Mitsubishi Ka 1
- Operator: Imperial Japanese Army Air Force
- Registration: J-BIDH
- Flight origin: Haneda Airport
- Crew: 2
- Fatalities: 2
- Survivors: 0

On August 24, 1938, an Imperial Japanese Army Air Force flying school Mitsubishi Ka 1 military trainer collided in midair with a Japan Air Transport Fokker Super Universal airliner over the Ōmori district of Tokyo, Japan. Both aircraft were destroyed, killing the crew of both planes – two on the military trainer and three on the airliner (there were no passengers). A large number of people on the ground gathered around the burning wreckage to observe what had just happened, but the fuel tank of the plane exploded several minutes later, killing or injuring many.

== Fatalities ==
Different sources give different ground casualty totals: 40 dead and 106 injured, at least 53 dead, 55 dead and 190 injured, 63 dead, 65 dead and 60 injured, 80 dead and 76 injured, 80 dead and 78 injured.
