= Yilan Airfield =

Abandoned airfield in Taiwan

Yilan Airfield
- 宜蘭飛行場
- Yilan, Taihoku Prefecture (now Taiwan) in Taiwan
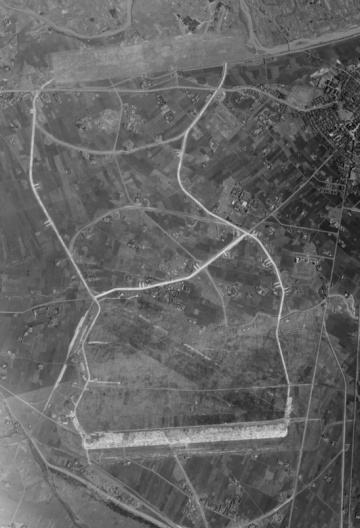
- Aerial photography of Giran Airfield, 1944-1945

Site information
- Owner: Kuomintang
- Operator: Republic of China Air Force
- Controlled by: Kuomintang
- Open to the public: No

Location
- Shown within Taiwan
- Coordinates: 24°43′56″N 121°45′04″E

Site history
- Built: 1936
- Built by: Japanese Army
- In use: 1936 - 1973
- Fate: Dismantled
- Battles/wars: Pacific War

Airfield information
- Identifiers: ICAO: RCMS
Runways
Direction	Length and surface
	5,000 feet (1,524 m) Asphalt

North, South and West airfields of Yilan Airfield

Yilan Airfield (ICAO: RCMS) (also known as Giran Airfield) is an abandoned airfield located in Yilan, Taihoku Prefecture, Taiwan. The first airfield of the three was built in 1936, with the other two built in 1943 and 1944. It mainly flew kamikaze missions until abandonment in 1945, before being acquired by the Kuomintang Government. It was closed in 1973 following failed attempts to upgrade the airfield.

This airport is not to be mistaken with Yilan Airport (IATA: YLN, ICAO: ZYYL), which operated from 1958 until 1977 by Civil Aviation Heilongjiang Provincial Administration in Yilan County, Mainland China.

== History ==
Yilan consisted of 3 airfields, south, north and a west airfield which was considered “secret”. The southern airfield was known as Giran Airfield.

In 1925, a reconnaissance aircraft flew from Hualien to Yilan, landing at the Jinliujie Army Training Ground. The pilot briefly rested before returning to Hualien, making the event as the first time Yilan residents saw an “iron bird’ land. It also served as a psychological show of force by the colonial authorities.

Giran Airfield (North airfield) was constructed in 1936, which was provided by demanding labour from students of the nearby agricultural college. The airfield was mostly built using hand-tools, and little to no equipment and machines were used. By 1938, Giran Airfield was completed with compacted earth reinforced runways installed using stone rollers, which was prone to flooding from the nearby Yilan River. Shortly after the completion, torrential rainfall submerged the runway, which subsequently underwent significant repairs and resumed operations by the end of 1938. From 1936 to 1938, Japan Air Transport operated a route to this airfield. In 1939, the airfield was acquired by the Kuomintang Government (KMT), and the airfield operated as a weather observation station, with a nearby meteorological observation building.

In June 1939, the control tower was built, and the airfield was expanded to an area of 0,27 square kilometers, which was relatively small. In January 1940, a weather observation facility was established, which included a three-story wind observation tower constructed using reinforced concrete.

=== World War II ===
In September 1943, Giran Airfield was requisitioned for military usage, which followed the Battle of Midway's defeat in June 1942. The airfield was reserved for airfield parking, while the South Airfield was built and heavily utilized by kamikaze pilots. There were 14 camouflaged hardened aircraft shelters to conceal aircraft, as it was a frequent bombing location by the United States Army Air Forces (USAAF). As the war progressed, students and locals were recruited to construct aircraft decoys using the nearby bamboo and install them on the wrong side of the airfield. However, this backfired, and allied pilots quickly noticed as there were no black smoke.

Towards the end of the Pacific War, the Kamikaze crew were stationed inside dormitories of the agricultural college, forcing the students to sleep in makeshift huts or inside the hall. Over 2,500 pilots had flown from the airfield to suicidal missions against the Allied forces. In 1944, a West Airfield, known as the secret airfield was constructed. By April 1945, special attack and escort missions were undertaken by remnants of the 17th and 19th Sentais. On 22 April 1945, 2nd Lieutenant Kuniomi Watanabe from the 3rd Chutai of the 19th Sentai launched a sortie against Allied ships from Yilan Airfield. The mission targeted US Navy ships in the coast of Kadena, Okinawa using a bomb-equipped Kawasaki Ki-61.

=== Post-war usage ===
After the war in 1945, Giran Airfield was abandoned by the Japanese forces, however, the KMT quickly acquired the airfield when they arrived to Taiwan. The northern and secret airfield were dismantled. Giran Airfield was used as an emergency landing ground, and also as a weather station. The airfield was renamed to Yilan, was paved by 5000 feet, and maintenance facilities installed approximately on the north-eastern side. Yilan Airfield was later handed over to the Taiwanese navy, which stationed one PC-3 Orion aircraft on the airfield as an airborne early warning aircraft. There was plans by the Navy to expand and upgrade the airfield's capabilities, however, it faced issues from the local government and nearby residents. These attempts were abandoned, and military was withdrawn along with the airfield closing down in 1973.

=== Current usage ===
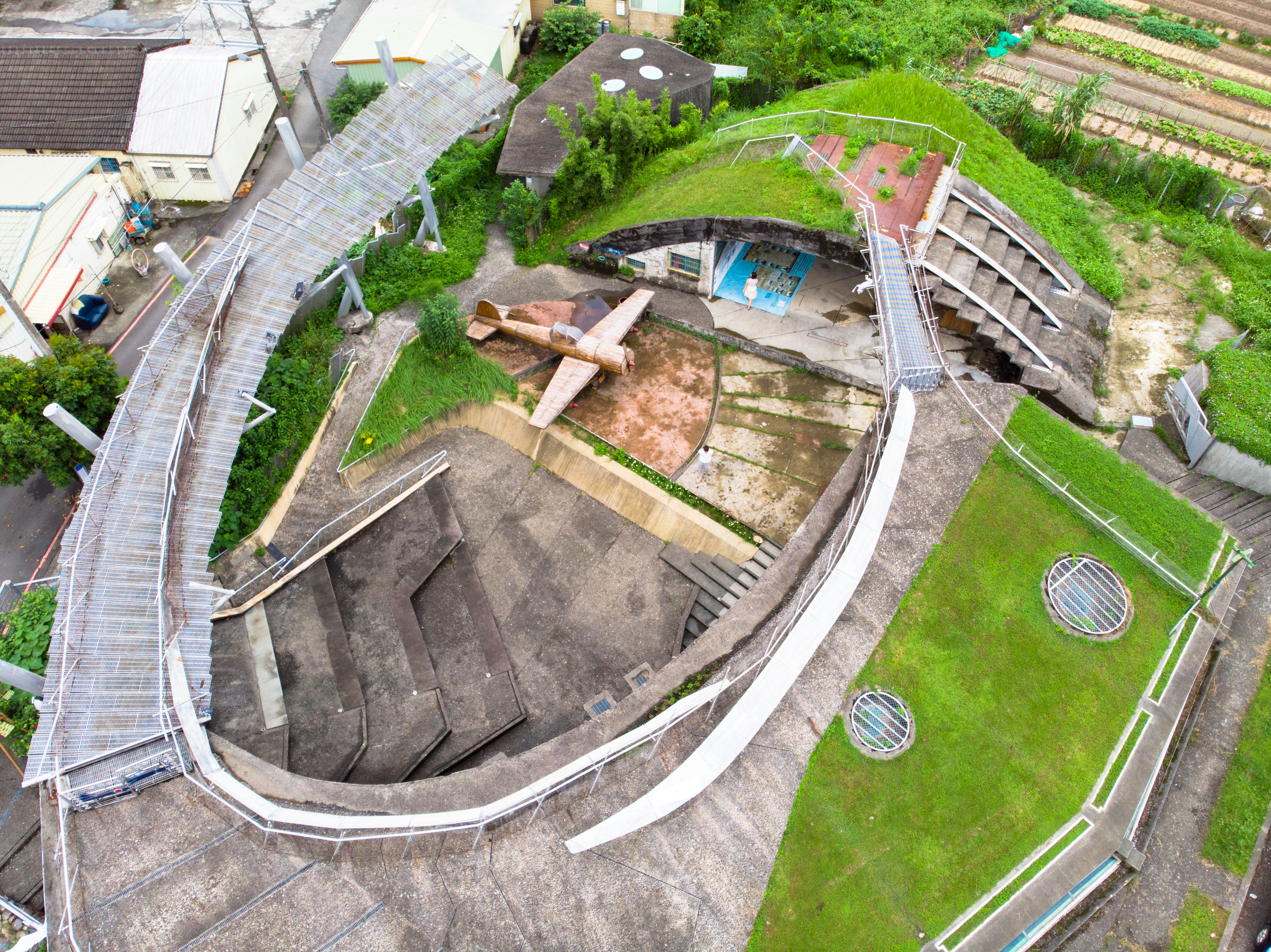
During the Japanese colonial period, several aircraft hangars were built in Yilan. The Yuanshan Hangar was one of those used to house Kamikaze fighter jets during World War II. Today, a bamboo aircraft is placed inside the hangar to represent the fighter jets of that era.

The site of the former three airfields were repurposed and their current usage are as follows:

- North airfield — currently the site of Yilan Reserve Command and Jinliujie Recruit Training Center of the R.O.C. Armed Forces
- South airfield — currently the site of Yilan Science Park of Hsinchu Science Park, Chengnan Campus of National Ilan University and Yilan Sports Park
- West airfield — currently the site of Kavalan Distillery

== Raids ==
The following raids held on Giran Airfield.

- On March 13, 1945, Grumman Avenger bombers supported by 1844 Naval Air Squadron’s Grumman Hellcats and 1830 Naval Air Squadron’s Vought Corsairs bombed the airfield, and damaged approximately 13 aircraft on Giran Airfield. The targeted aircraft may have been decoys or dummy planes.
- On April 1, 1945, Consolidated B-24 Liberator bombers of the 43rd Bomb Group (H) of the US 5th Army Air Force bomber Giran Airfield.
- On April 13, 1945, Avenger aircraft took off from HMS Victorious, en route back to the carrier after previously attacking Matsuyama Airfield strafed 12 aircraft on the ground at Giran Airfield.
- On April 18, 1945, bombers attacked Giran Airfield.
- On April 16, 1945, B-24s and North American P-51 Mustangs of the Far East Air Forces attacked Giran Airfield and Matsuyama Airfield.
