= Nakajima Ki-6 =

Japanese transport aircraft

Ki-6
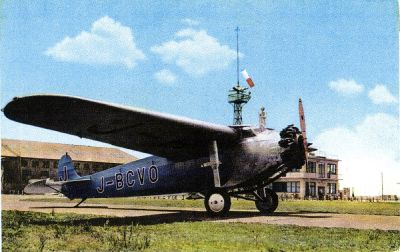
- Civil version of Ki-6 in use by Japan Air Transport

General information
- Type: transport, training aircraft
- Manufacturer: Nakajima Aircraft Company
- Primary users: IJA Air Force Manchukuo Air Force

History
- Introduction date: 1931
- First flight: 1930
- Developed from: Fokker Super Universal

The Nakajima Ki-6 (九五式二型練習機, Kyūgo-shiki nigata renshuki) was a licensed-produced version of the Fokker Super Universal transport built by Nakajima Aircraft Company in the 1930s. Initially used as an airliner, the militarized version was used by the Imperial Japanese Army in a variety of roles, ranging from medical evacuation to transport and training aircraft. It was used extensively in combat zones in Manchukuo and in China during the Second Sino-Japanese War.

== Design and development ==
The Ki-6 originated as the Model 8 Super Universal, launched by Fokker in the United States in 1927 as a further development of its successful Fokker Universal. The Super Universal was slightly larger and could carry six passengers rather than four. In addition, the aircraft was equipped with a more powerful engine and a cantilever high-wing. In total, about 200 Super Universals are thought to have been built. Due to its rugged durability, long-range flight ability and large cargo capacity, the Fokker Super Universal was extensively used in bush flying and was well regarded for its versatility. The first flight took place in March 1928. Shortly after, the type entered production at a new factory in Glendale, California. The Super Universal remained in production until January 1931.

The Super Universal caught the attention of a number of civil airlines from 1928 onwards. There was also interest from the United States military, although no order was placed. Fokker received export orders from Colombia, Argentina, South Africa, and Japan, and a license production agreements were made with the Canadian subsidiary of Vickers and with Nakajima Aircraft Company in Japan.

== Operational history ==
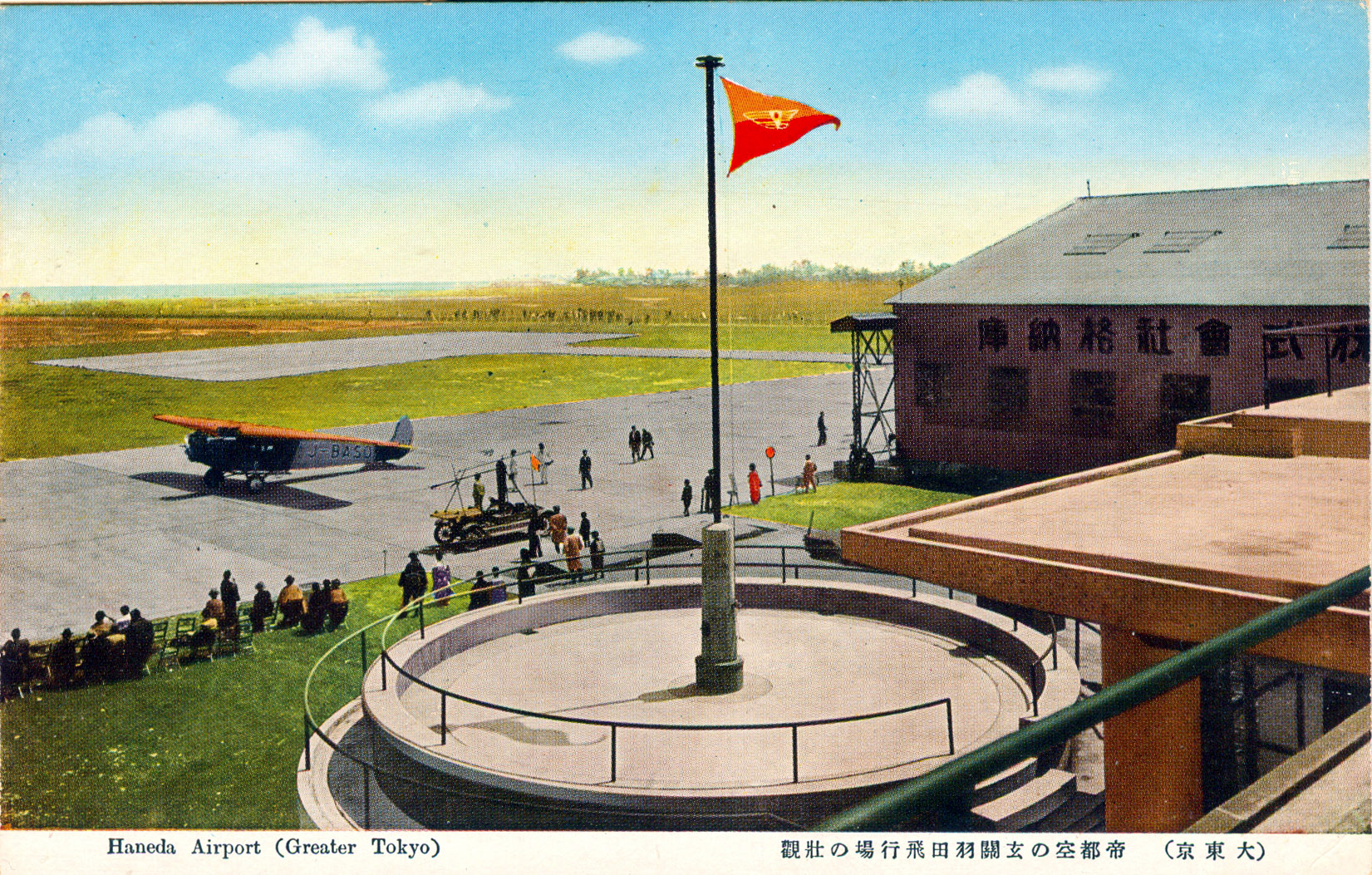
Super Universal/Nakajima Ki-6 operated by Japan Air Transportation Corporation

The first Super Universal was brought to Japan in components and assembled by Nakajima for Japan Air Transport, the national airline of the Empire of Japan from 1928-38. Under license production, Nakajima replaced the engine with a 336 kW (450 hp) Bristol Jupiter radial engine, also license-built in Japan and, later, by its own Nakajima Kotobuki 343 kW (460 hp) engine.

Nakajima's production began in September 1930, with the first aircraft delivered in March 1931. Production ended in October 1936, but the total number of aircraft built is unknown. Nakajima also sub-licensed additional production to its subsidiary Manshūkoku Hikōki Seizo KK in Manchukuo, which also produced an unknown number of units. The first military Super Universals were introduced into service following Japan's invasion of Manchuria in 1931 when the Imperial Japanese Army commandeered seven Super Universals from the Japan Air Transport Company.

In 1932, the Imperial Japanese Army Air Force decided to acquire its own transports, which it designated as the Army Type 95 Training Aircraft under the former aircraft naming nomenclature system or Ki-6 under the new system. The first aircraft was delivered as a flying ambulance fitted with two stretchers and three seats. This was followed by an order for twenty trainers to be used for training pilots, gunners, bombardiers, and wireless operators.

The Imperial Japanese Navy Air Service also ordered twenty Ki-6s, re-designating the aircraft as the Navy Fokker Land-Based Reconnaissance Aircraft or, in short, C2N1 when used for land-based operations, and an additional thirty Navy Fokker Reconnaissance Seaplane or, in short, C2N2, which were fitted with a floatplane. The naval version had a larger cabin and was used on reconnaissance and military transport missions.

The aircraft built in Japan were used for both civil and military roles with some remaining in operation until after World War II.

== Variants ==
- Nakajima Super Universal

Civilian transport

- Ki-6 (Army Type 95 Training Aircraft)

Military transport for the IJAAF

- C2N1 (Navy land-based reconnaissance aircraft)

Land-based recon and military transport for the IJN

- C2N2 (Navy reconnaissance seaplane)

Land-based recon and military transport for the IJN

- Manshū Super Universal

Civil and military transport built in Manchukuo (Manchuria)

== Operators ==
=== Civilian operators ===
- Japan Air Transport (Nihon Kōkū Yusō KK), the national airline of the Empire of Japan from 1928 to 1938.
- Imperial Japanese Airways (Dai Nippon Kōkū KK), the national airline of the Empire of Japan from 1938 to 1945.
- Manchukuo National Airways

=== Military operators ===
- Imperial Japanese Army Air Force
- Imperial Japanese Navy Air Service
- Manchukuo Air Force

== Specifications (Ki-6) ==
Data from Japanese AIrcraft, 1910-1941

General characteristics

- Crew: 1
- Capacity: 6
- Length: 11.25 m (36 ft 11 in)
- Wingspan: 15.44 m (50 ft 7.87 in)
- Height: 2.79 m (9 ft 2 in)
- Wing area: 37.37 m^{2} (402.26 sq ft)
- Empty weight: 1,640 kg (3,616 lb)
- Gross weight: 2,820 kg (6,217 lb)
- Powerplant: 1 × Nakajima Kotobuki air-cooled radial engine , 336 kW (450 hp)

Performance

- Maximum speed: 245 km/h (152 mph, 132 kn)
- Range: 1,045 km (650 mi, 560 nmi)
- Service ceiling: 6,000 m (19,685 ft)

== See also ==
- List of military aircraft of Japan

Related development

- Fokker Super Universal

== Bibliography ==
- Francillon, René J. (1979). Japanese Aircraft of the Pacific War. London: Putnam & Company Ltd. ISBN 0-370-30251-6.
- Mikesh, Robert C.; Abe, Shorzoe (1990). Japanese Aircraft, 1910-1941. London: Putnam & Company Ltd. ISBN 0-85177-840-2.
