= Japan Air Transport =

Japanese national airline (1928–1938)

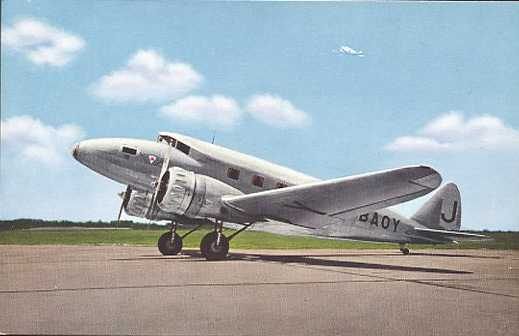
- Nakajima AT-2, used on routes between Tokyo, Japan and Xinjing, Manchukuo
IATA	ICAO	Call sign
-	-	-
- Founded: October 30, 1928
- Commenced operations: 1929
- Ceased operations: December 1938 (merged into Imperial Japanese Airways)
- Operating bases: Tachikawa Airfield (1929-1931); Haneda Airport (1931-1938)
- Destinations: Manchukuo

Japan Air Transport Corporation (日本航空輸送株式会社, Nihon Kōkū Yusō Kabushiki Kaisha) was the national airline of the Empire of Japan from 1928 to 1938.

== History ==
Commercial aviation began in Japan with the privately held Japan Air Transport Institute, which pioneered passenger service between Sakai, Osaka and Tokushima on Shikoku island on 12 November 1922.

On 30 October 1928, the Japanese government established the Japan Air Transport Corporation (JAT) as the national flag carrier under the Ministry of Communications. JAT absorbed the Japan Air Transport Institute and two other small companies and began scheduled passenger services in 1929; international service from Fukuoka to Dalian via Korea commenced in September 1929. It initially used the Imperial Japanese Army air base at Tachikawa as its terminal in Tokyo. JAT later moved to Haneda Airport, which was completed in August 1931.

JAT was heavily subsidized by the Japanese government, receiving the equivalent of $1 billion in today's currency prior to the attack on Pearl Harbor. During the early 1930s, its aircraft were often chartered (for free) by the military for missions in Asia, especially during the 1931 invasion of Manchuria.

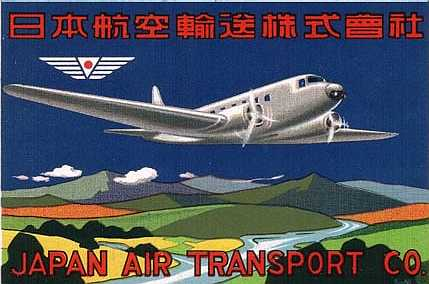
JAT luggage label from 1930s

This role declined as military transport missions in China were taken over by three new carriers that JAT helped to establish: Manchukuo National Airways in 1932, Huitong Airways in 1936 and China Airways in 1938. These subsidiary companies were joint ventures between JAT and the puppet governments of Manchukuo and the Provisional Government of the Republic of China. JAT's network connected to the Manchukuo network at Sinuiju in Korea.

JAT began service from Fukuoka to Naha and Taipei (Taihoku) in October 1935, providing the first same-day connection between the Japanese home islands and Taiwan.

JAT shifted its focus to the civilian passenger market and began using new 14-passenger Douglas DC-2s on new, more commercially profitable routes between Japan and Manchukuo in 1936. With the start of the Second Sino-Japanese War in 1937, JAT benefited from a resurgence in military passenger traffic.

In 1938, JAT carried nearly 70,000 passengers, representing 2.6 percent of the world's passenger traffic.

In December 1938, the government established a new airline, Imperial Japanese Airways, as a monopoly for all civil aviation and Japan Air Transport Corporation was merged into the new company.

== Aircraft ==
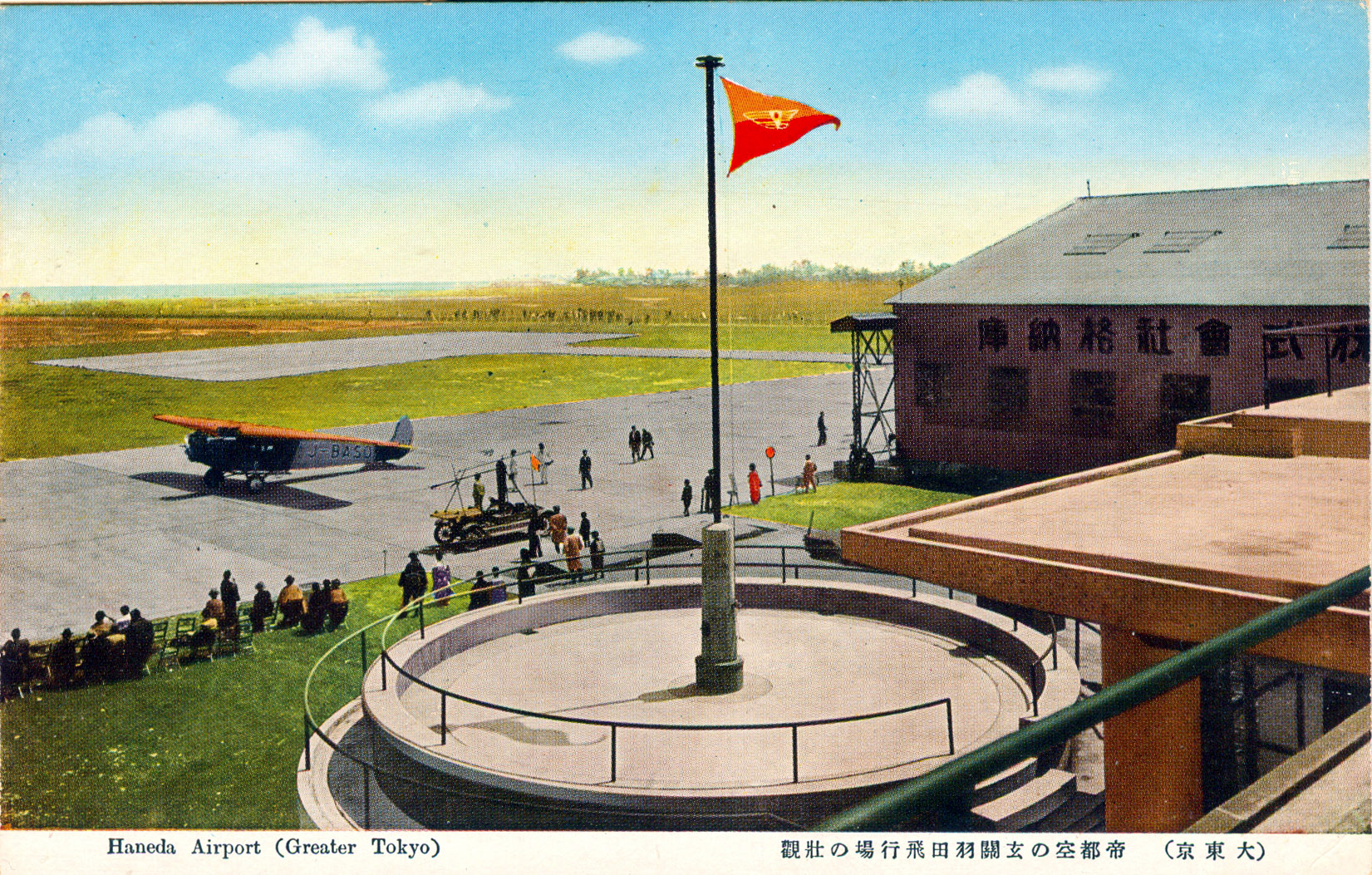
Fokker Super Universal

- Fokker Trimotor (1929-1938)
- Fokker Super Universal
- Nakajima Super Universal (1929-1938)
- Nakajima-Douglas DC-2 (1936-1938)
- Nakajima AT-2 (1937-1938)

== Destinations ==
JAT flew to the following destinations prior to its merger into IJA in 1938.

=== Japanese home islands ===
- Aomori
- Fukuoka - Fukuoka Airport
- Kochi
- Matsue
- Nagoya
- Naha - Naha Airport
- Niigata
- Osaka - Kizugawa Airport 1929–1938
- Sapporo
- Sendai
- Tokyo - Tachikawa Airfield 1929-1933; Haneda Airport 1933–1938
- Tokushima - Seaplane base 1922-??
- Tottori
- Toyama

=== Asia ===
- Beijing (Peking)
- Daegu (Taikyu)
- Dalian (Dairen) - Zhoushuizi Airport
- Hsinking (Shinkyo)
- Hualien (Karenko)
- Kaohsiung (Takao)
- Shenyang (Mukden)
- Nanjing (Nanking)
- Pyongyang (Heijo)
- Seoul (Keijo) - Yeouido Airport
- Shanghai
- Sinuiju (Singisyu)
- Taichung (Taityu)
- Tainan
- Taipei (Taihoku) - Songshan Airport
- Qingdao (Tsingtao)
- Ulsan (Urusan)
- Yilan (Giran) - Yilan Airfield 1936 - 1938

== Accidents and incidents ==
24 August 1938
Nakajima Super Universal (J-BJDO) collided in mid-air with a Mitsubishi Ka-1 (J-BIDH) over Ōmori, Tokyo, killing all five on board both aircraft and 40–80 on the ground (sources differ). The high causality count was because a large crowd gathered around the wreckage, but then the Fokker's fuel tank exploded a few minutes after the crash.
