= Korean National Airlines =

Airline of Korea

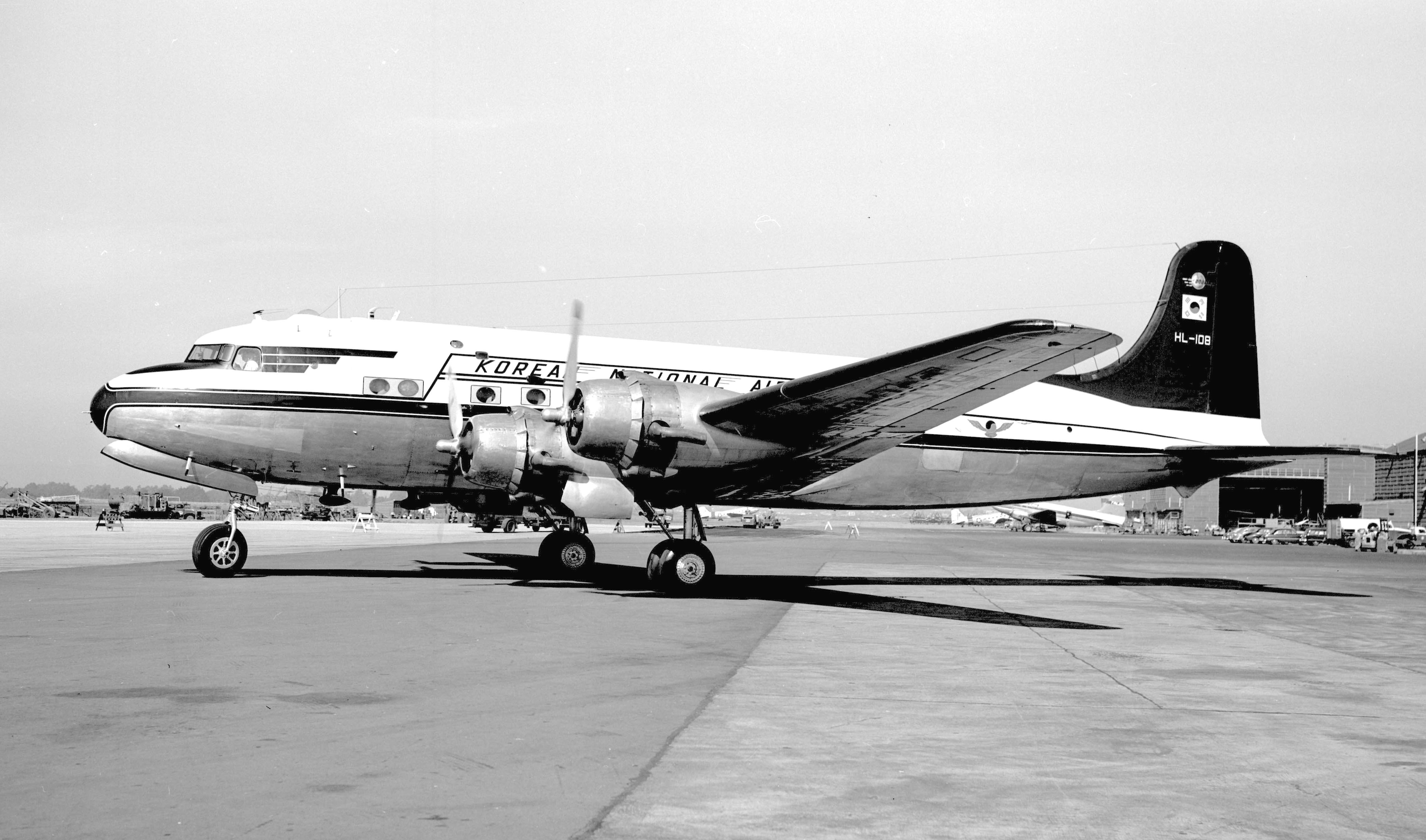
- Founded: 1946; 80 years ago
- Commenced operations: 1948
- Ceased operations: 1962 (nationalized)
- Operating bases: Yeouido Airport
- Fleet size: 7
- Headquarters: Seoul, South Korea
- Key people: Shin Yong-Wook (founder & CEO)

- Korean National Airlines
- Hangul: 대한국민항공
- Hanja: 大韓國民航空
- RR: Daehan gungmin hanggong
- MR: Taehan kungmin hanggong

Korean National Airlines (KNA) was the first (commercial cargo and passenger) air carrier in Korea. Established in 1946 and incorporated in 1948 in South Korea, its first official passenger flight was from Seoul to Pusan on October 30, 1948 (which is now Korea's National Air Day holiday). The carrier was an international carrier – though it was privately owned by its founding chairman, Captain Shin Yong-Wook (신용욱). It operated under the brand name Koreanair.

KNA operated from 1947 to 1950 with Stinson Voyager aircraft, suspended operations from 1950 to 1952 due to the Korean War, and resumed flying in 1952 with Douglas DC-3 and Douglas DC-4 aircraft.

In late 1961, many Korean industries, including transportation, were nationalized in an effort to spur the country's economic growth. Shin Yong-Wook challenged the government's authority to nationalize his company, but KNA was ultimately taken over in a forced acquisition by the government in 1962, only to be sold to Hanjin by the Third Republic of Korea government in 1969.

== Fleet ==
The Korean National Airlines fleet ultimately consisted of the following aircraft:

Korean National Airlines fleet
Aircraft	Total	Notes
Douglas DC-3	4	1 leased from All Nippon Airways
Douglas DC-4	2	1 leased from Japan Airlines
Lockheed L-749 Constellation	1	

Two Fokker F.27 Friendships were on order by KNA at the time of its demise and were eventually operated by Korean Air Lines.

== Destinations ==
KNA served the following destinations:

- Busan - three daily DC-3 services in 1957; two daily DC-3 and DC-4 services by 1961
- Gangneung - four DC-3 services per week as of 1957; weekly by 1961
- Gwangju - two weekly DC-3 services in 1957; three by 1961
- Hong Kong - weekly DC-4 service in 1957; weekly Constellation service by 1961
- Jeju - three weekly DC-3 services from Gwangju by 1961
- Seoul (hub)
