= Yilan Airport =

Former airport in Yilan County, Heilongjiang in China

- IATA: YLN; ICAO: ZYYL

Summary
- Airport type: Defunct
- Owner: Civil Aviation Heilongjiang Provincial Administration
- Location: Yilan County, Heilongjiang in China
- Opened: 1958
- Closed: 1979
- Built: 1932
- In use: 1933 — 1945 Imperial Japanese Army Air Service
- Elevation AMSL: 321.52 ft (98.00 m)
- Coordinates: 46°17′48″N 129°35′07″E

Map
- Location in China Yilan Airport (Heilongjiang)

Yilan Airport, also known as Yilan Forest Protection Airport (IATA: YLN, ICAO: ZYYL) was an airport in Yilan County, Mainland China. It was established in 1932 by the Japanese in Manchuria, and was subject to heavy attacks by the Red Army during World War II. Following the war, it remained inactive until it was reactivated in 1952 to serve forest protection interests in the region. Civilian operations began in 1958, though it had low passenger numbers and minimal facilities. After newer and larger airports were opening up in the region, Yilan Airport was closed in 1979.

The airport is not to be confused with Yilan Airfield in Taihoku Prefecture, Taiwan, which was also built by the Japanese.

== History ==
In May 1932, Yilan County was captured by the advancing 10th Division of the Imperial Japanese Army. Subsequently, Chinese forces were withdrawn from Yilan on the 17th of that month. Afterwards, the division constructed Yilan Airport in 1932, entering service in September 1933. It was established as part of a larger network of Japanese airfields, including Zhengjiatun (Shuangliao), Tao'an (Taonan), and Nenjiang, Hailin, and Hailun, the three of which located in Heilongjiang. In July 1934, the Japanese opened the Harbin-Yilan route, having round trips every Monday, Wednesday, and Friday.

=== Post-war ===
After Japanese surrender in 1945, the airport remained inactive during the following years. In 1946, Communist cadre Wei Jian and his colleagues began investigating airports and searching for aviation equipment to help establish the Northeast Democratic Allied Army Aviation School. During the search, he briefly surveyed Yilan Airport, noting that it had been destroyed. In 1952, the airport was reactivated as Yilan Forest Protection Airport, supporting Heilongjiang's aviation focus in aerial forest protection. Personnel and equipment would be supplied by the Beijing Professional Flight Brigade. In 1958, it was fully repaired and the Yilan Civil Aviation Station was opened, operated by the Civil Aviation Administration of China (CAAC). Following opening, the Harbin—Yilan route was reinstated. The airport was equipped with two main runways, one measuring 1,000 meters long and 50 meters wide made of grass and the other measuring 600 meters long and 48 metres wide made of concrete. Both had 50 meter earthen safety areas at either end, and there was a second secondary grass surface runway measuring 550 meters long and 50 metres wide. Each runway was capable of handling Shijiazhuang Y-5 aircraft. It had an aircraft parking apron with a capacity of two Y-5 aircraft, and facilities included an air-route navigation station, control tower, and air-ground radio station. It was not equipped with night-flight equipment.

=== Closure ===
By the 1970s, Yilan Airport remained among the few airports in China that were poorly equipped and mostly unpaved. It was also unable to accommodate CAAC's widely used Hawker Siddeley Trident aircraft. By 1978, the airport only served five routes and handled 51,800 passengers annually. The newer and larger Harbin Yanjiagnag Airport entered service in 1979, and the Yilan Civil Aviation Station was withdrawn and closed.

By 2010, only the concrete runway survived reclamation, though it was in bad condition. The grass runways and concrete taxiways have since disappeared. In 2013, Yilan County recovered the state-owned land-use right of the former airport to develop the Yilan Economic Development Zone. Afterwards, the Chengnan grain-processing and logistics industrial park was established over the eastern half of the derelict runway.

Satellite imagery dated 2025 reveals that the western of the runway is still visible, and the taxiway is still distinctive from the surrounding agricultural land.
