= Yeouido Park =

Park in Seoul, South Korea

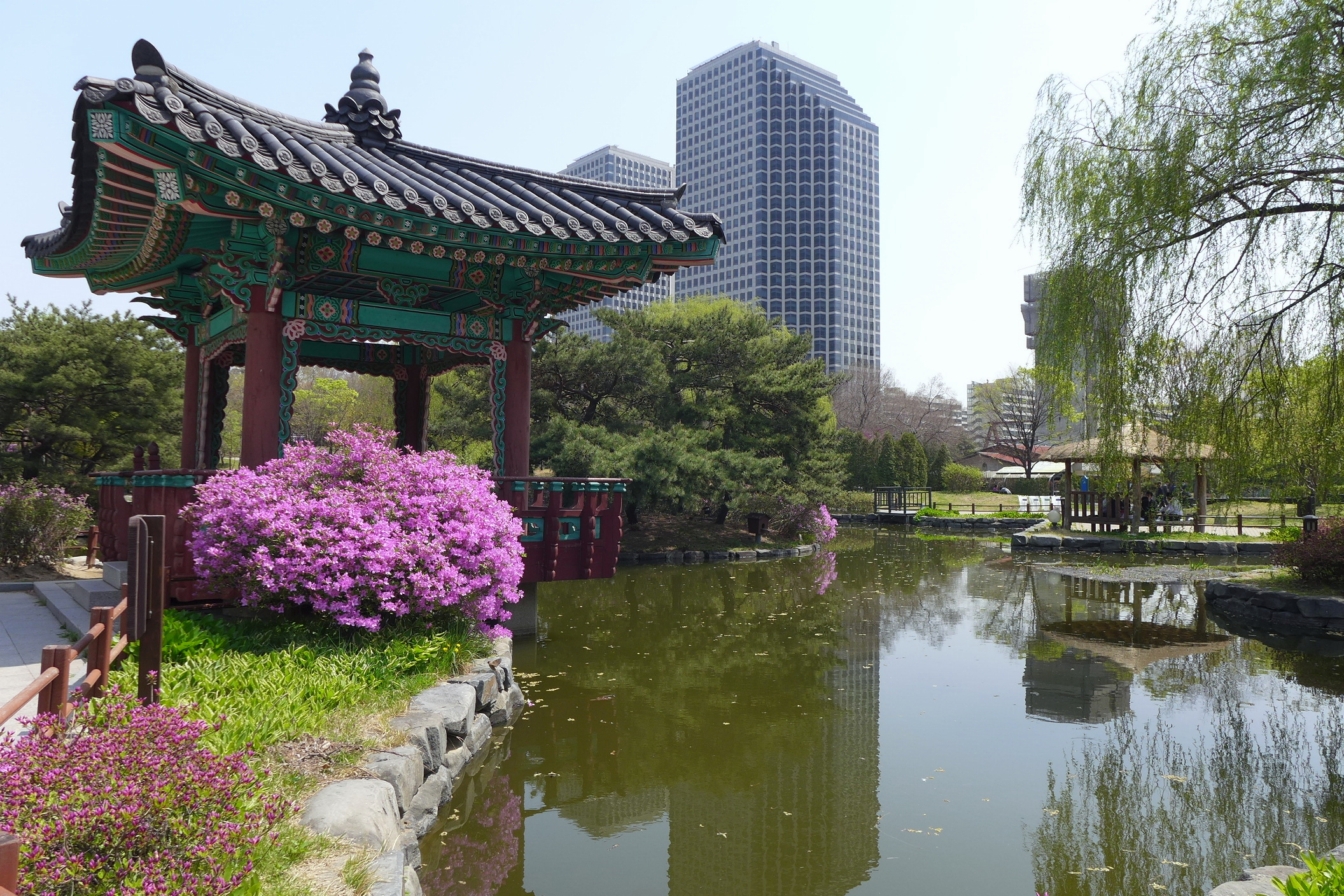
- A pond and pavilion in the park, April 2015
- Interactive map of Yeouido Park
- Location: Yeouido-dong, Yeongdeungpo District, Seoul

Korean name
- Hangul: 여의도공원
- Hanja: 汝矣島公園
- RR: Yeouido gongwon
- MR: Yŏŭido kongwŏn

Yeouido Park (Korean: 여의도공원) is a park in Yeouido-dong, Yeongdeungpo District, Seoul, South Korea.

The park, which runs northeast–southwest through the centre of the island, has a large open area which is popular with bicyclists and skateboarders, and breaks into footpaths lined with trees and seasonal flowers.

The area was only made a park in recent years. In 1924, the area was occupied by Yeouido Airport, the first airport in the country. In the 1970s, it was made into an asphalt strip and named May 16 Square by President Park Chung Hee. It was finally redeveloped into a park and opened to the public on July 5, 1999.

== History ==
During the Japanese colonial period, the site was the location of Seoul's first airport, Yeouido Airport, which was built in April 1924. In the 1970s, the area was developed into an asphalt strip as part of the Han River development project led by President Park Chung Hee, who named it May 16 Square in reference to the coup he led in 1961.

In May 1984, Pope John Paul II held a canonization mass in the park for Saints Andrew Kim Taegon, Paul Chong Hasang, and 101 other martyrs who were executed during the Joseon period.

After having lain under asphalt for 27 years, May 16 Square was subsequently redeveloped, and was reopened on July 5, 1999.

In December 2025 EXIT 1 GTX-B Yeouido Station under construction.

== Gallery ==
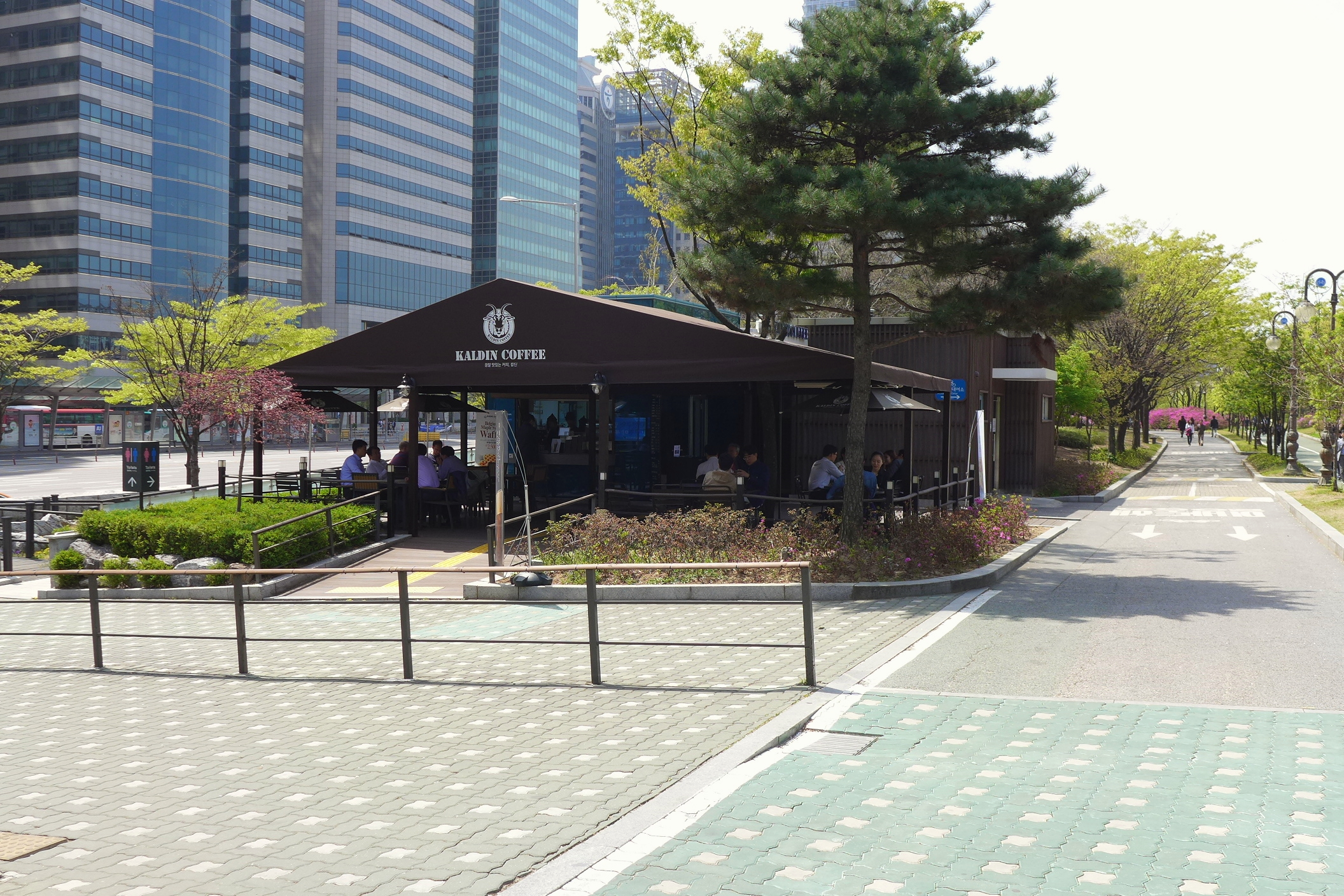
A coffee shop near the edge of the park.
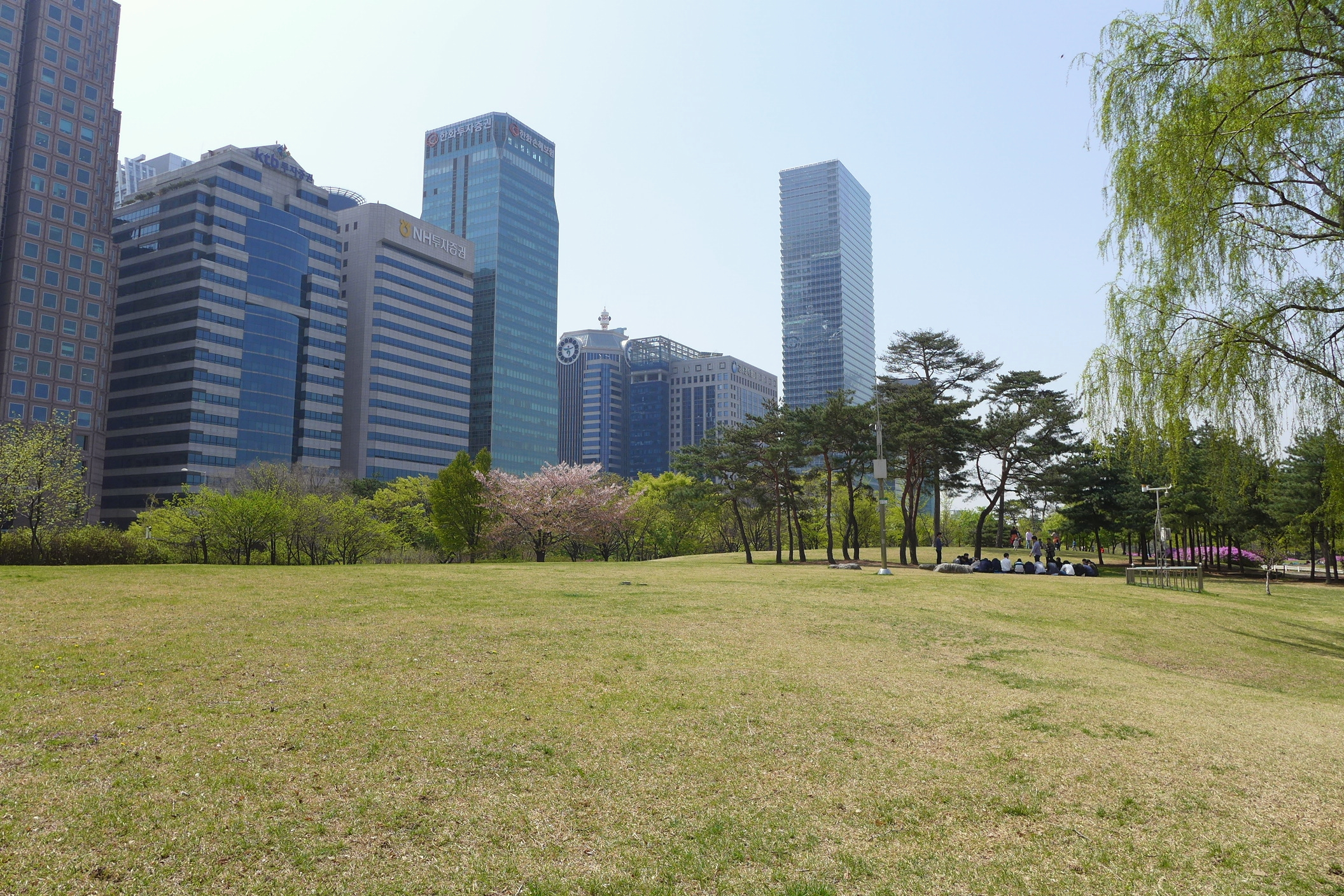
a grassy field in the middle of the park.

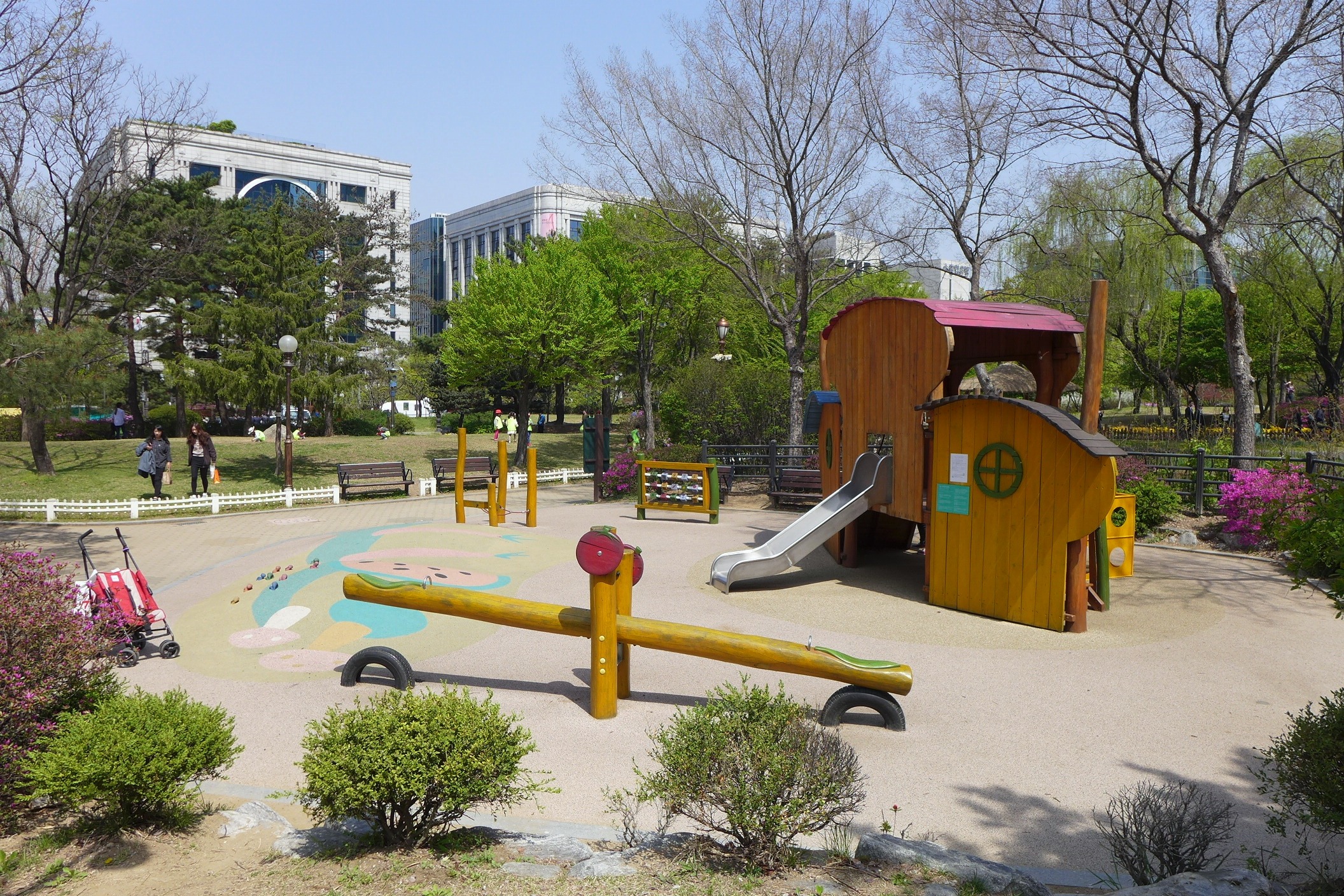
One of several playgrounds scattered throughout the park.

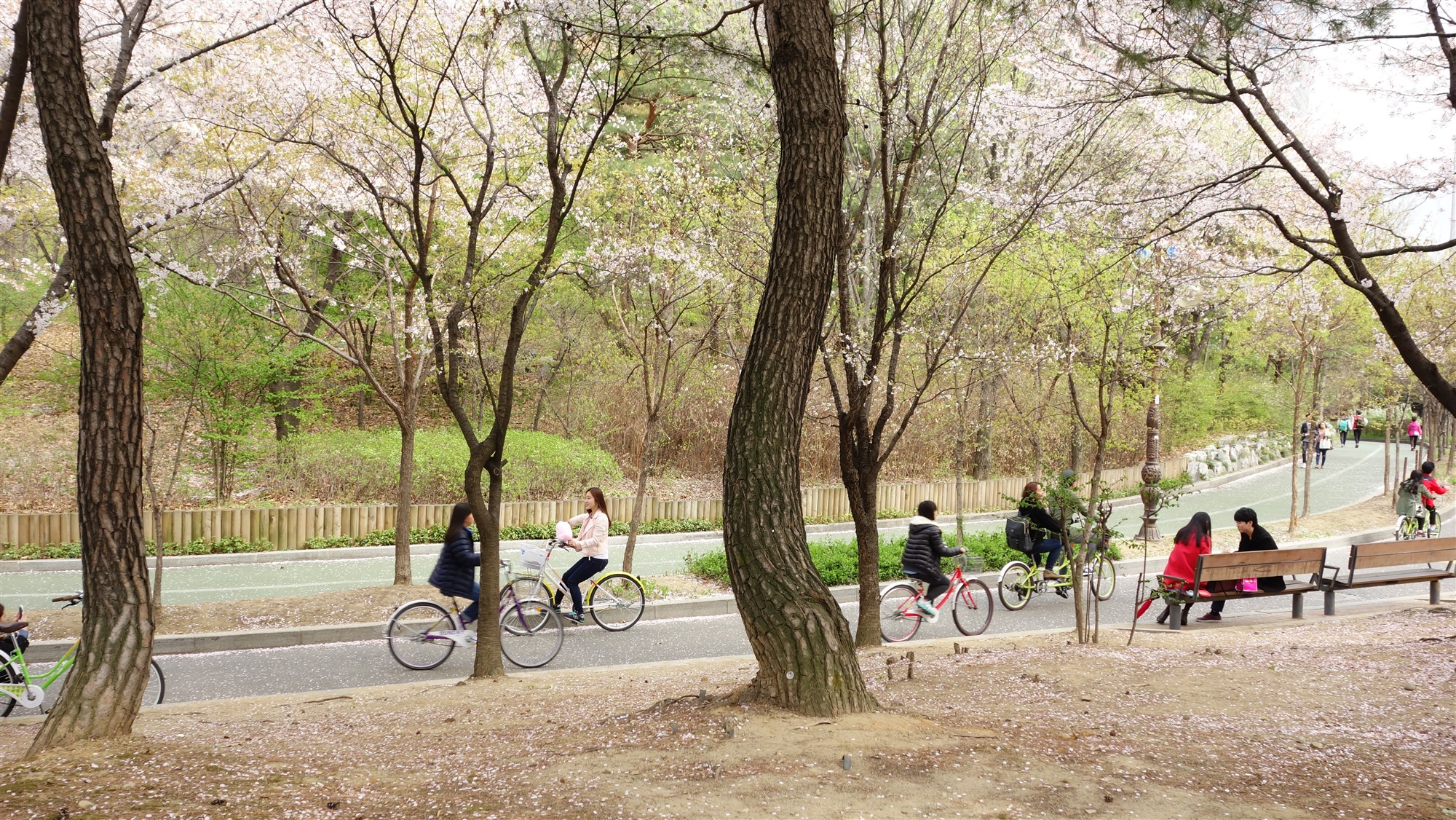
Yeouido Park bicyclists

== See also ==
- Hangang Park
