= Seoul Air Base =

Air base in Seongnam, Gyeonggi, South Korea

Coordinates: 37°26′45″N 127°06′50″E

Seoul Air Base 서울공항
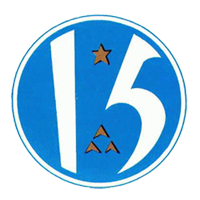
- IATA: SSN; ICAO: RKSM

Summary
- Airport type: Military
- Owner/Operator: Republic of Korea Air Force
- Serves: Seoul metropolitan area
- Location: Seongnam, Gyeonggi, South Korea
- Opened: February 1971; 55 years ago
- Elevation AMSL: 92 ft / 28 m
- Interactive map of Seoul Air Base

Runways
Direction	Length		Surface
Direction	m	ft	Surface
01/19	2,743	9,000	Asphalt
02/20	2,957	9,700	Asphalt
- Source: DAFIF

Seoul Air Base (IATA: SSN, ICAO: RKSM) — sometimes K-16 Air Base, Seoul Airport, or Seongnam Air Base — is located in Seongnam city, near Seoul, the capital of South Korea. Runway 19 and 20 are equipped with an ILS.

== History ==
It was constructed when Korea was under Japanese rule when it was known as Yeouido Air Base. (Korean: 여의도 비행장)

=== Korean War ===
The USAF designated the Yeouido air base as K-16 during the Korean War.

USAF units based here included:

- 35th Fighter-Interceptor Group operating F-51s from 8 April 1951.
- Detachment F, 3rd Air Rescue Squadron operating Sikorsky H-5s from 19 October 1950
- 2157th Air Rescue Squadron operating Sikorsky H-19s

=== Postwar ===
Yeouido Air Base was closed in 1970, moved garrison to current Sinchon-ri, and named it Seoul Air Base.

The base is home to the ROKAF 15th Special Missions Wing.

The US Army's 2nd Battalion (Assault), 2nd Aviation Regiment, 2nd Infantry Division operating Sikorsky UH-60 Blackhawks is based there.

The Seoul ADEX is held biennially in this airfield.

The base is used as a VIP airfield by the President of Republic of Korea and other VIPs and heads of state.

=== Construction of a Lotte World Tower ===
On the survey conducted by Sisain Press, 86% of military pilots and air traffic controllers opposed the construction of a Lotte World Tower because of a safety hazard. They were concerned that it would interfere with the flight path. President Lee Myeong Bak (2008–2012) got the green light for a 555-meter-tall (1,821 ft) skyscraper after rebuilding the airfield to deviate from the 123-story tower in Jamsil, Seoul. The building now operates as Lotte World Tower, the tallest building in any OECD country.

== See also ==
- List of United States Army installations in South Korea
