= Fokker Super Universal =

1928 airliner family by Fokker

Super Universal
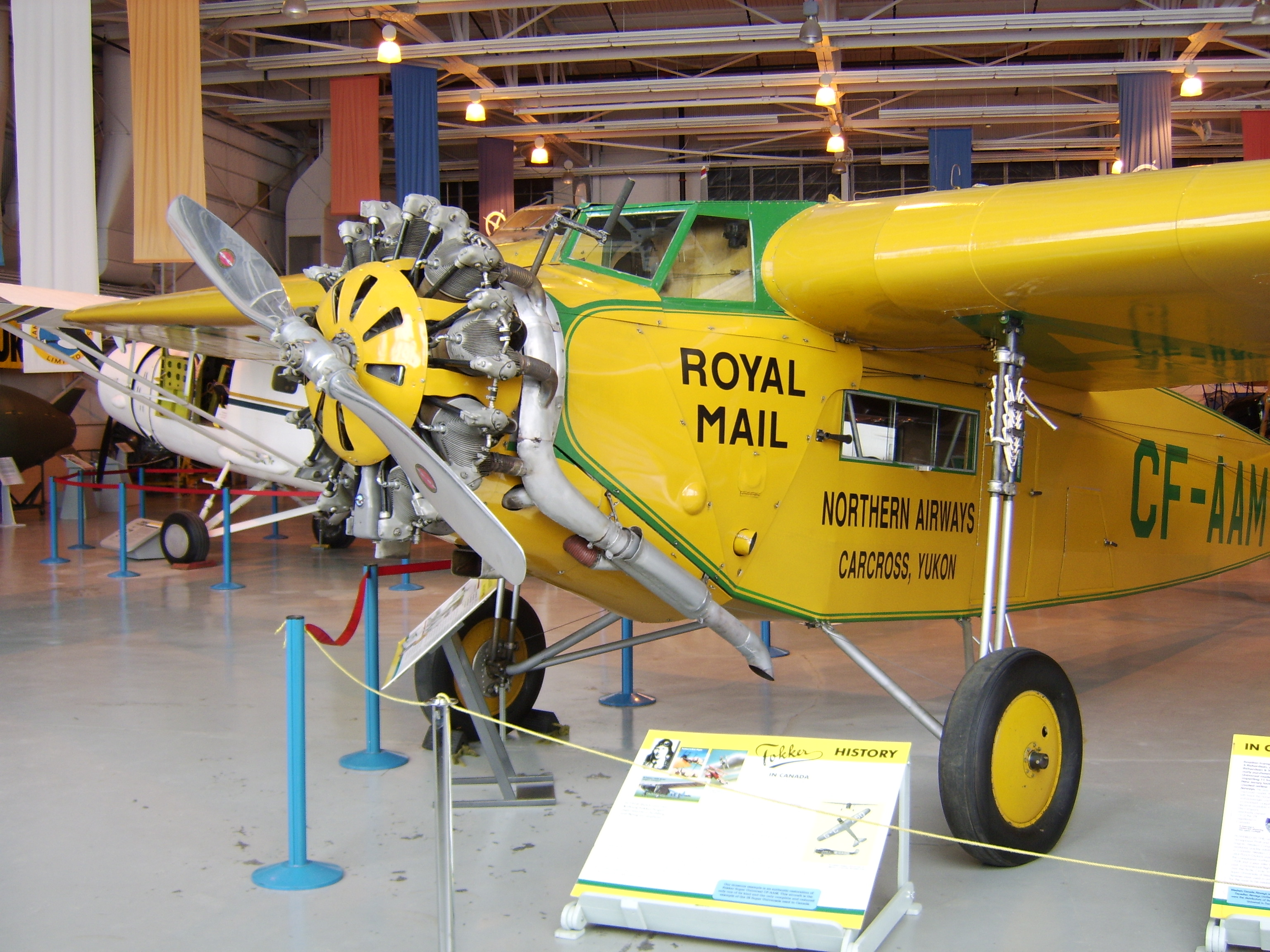
- Restored Fokker Super Universal at the Western Canada Aviation Museum in Winnipeg, Manitoba.

General information
- Type: Airliner
- Manufacturer: Fokker-America; Canadian Vickers
- Number built: ca. 200

History
- First flight: March 1928
- Developed from: Fokker Universal
- Variant: Nakajima Ki-6

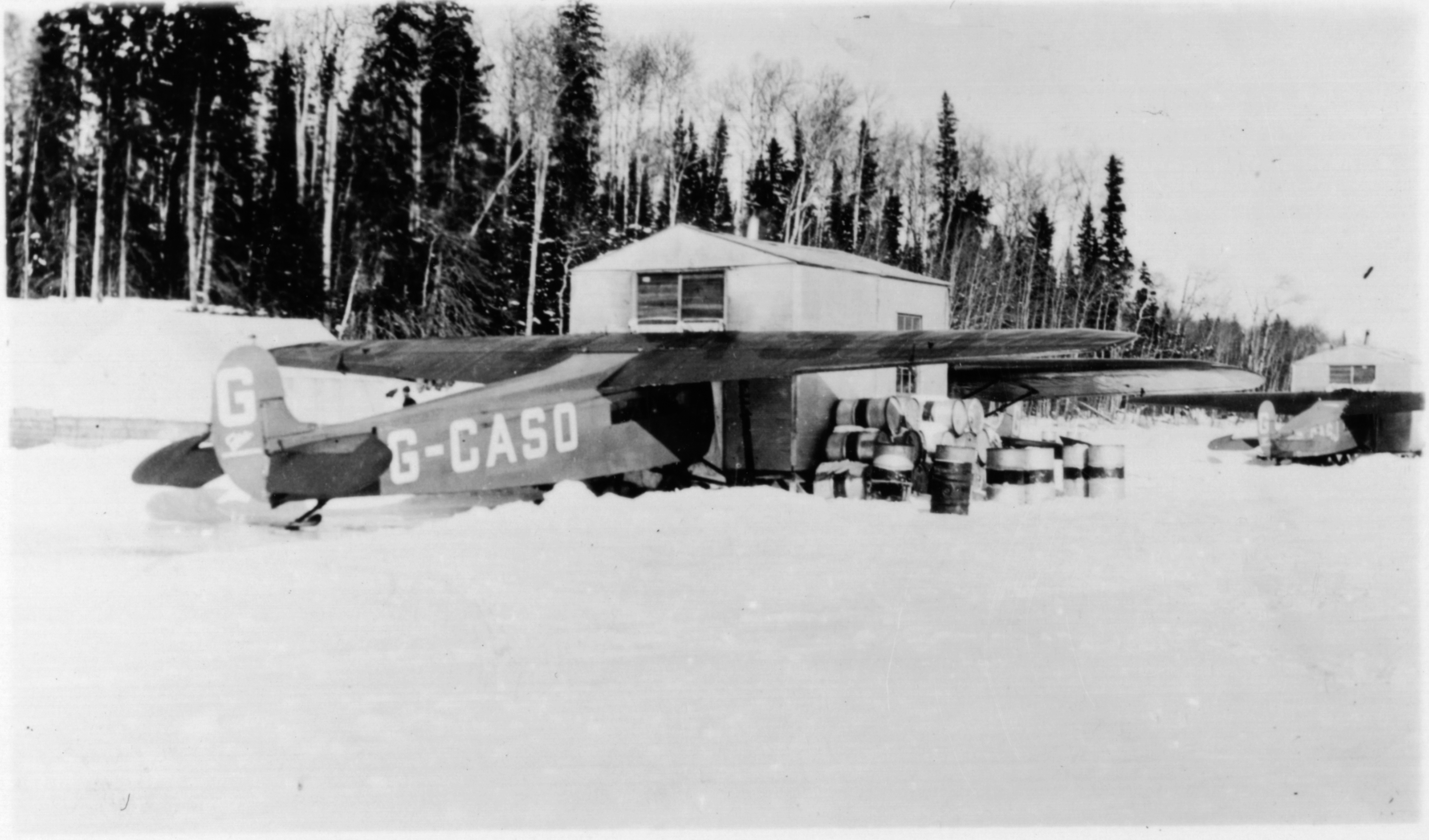
Fokker Super Universal airplane docked in a nose hangar, Ontario, [ca. 1925]

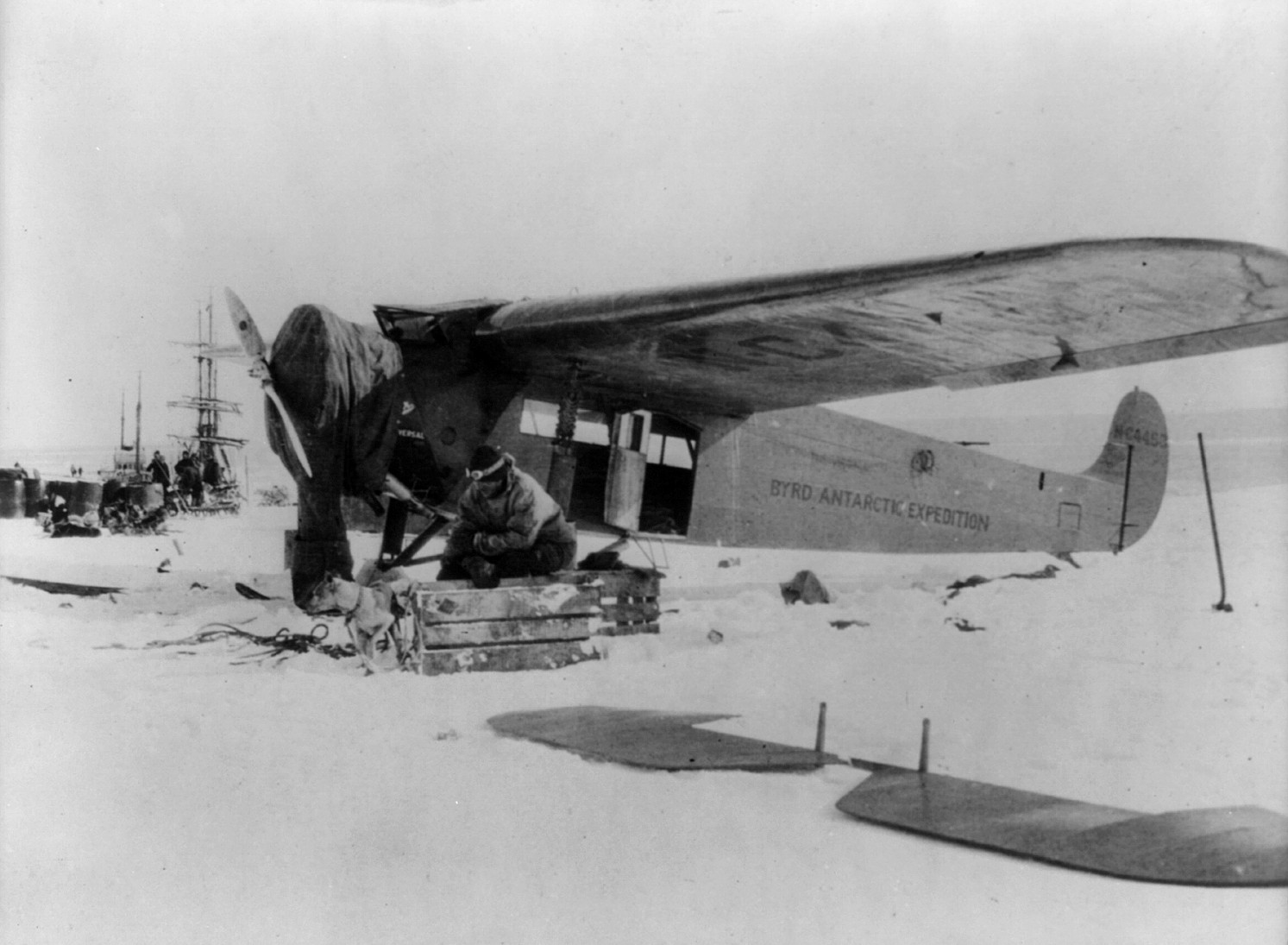
Fokker Super Universal of the Bryd Antarctic expedition of 1929

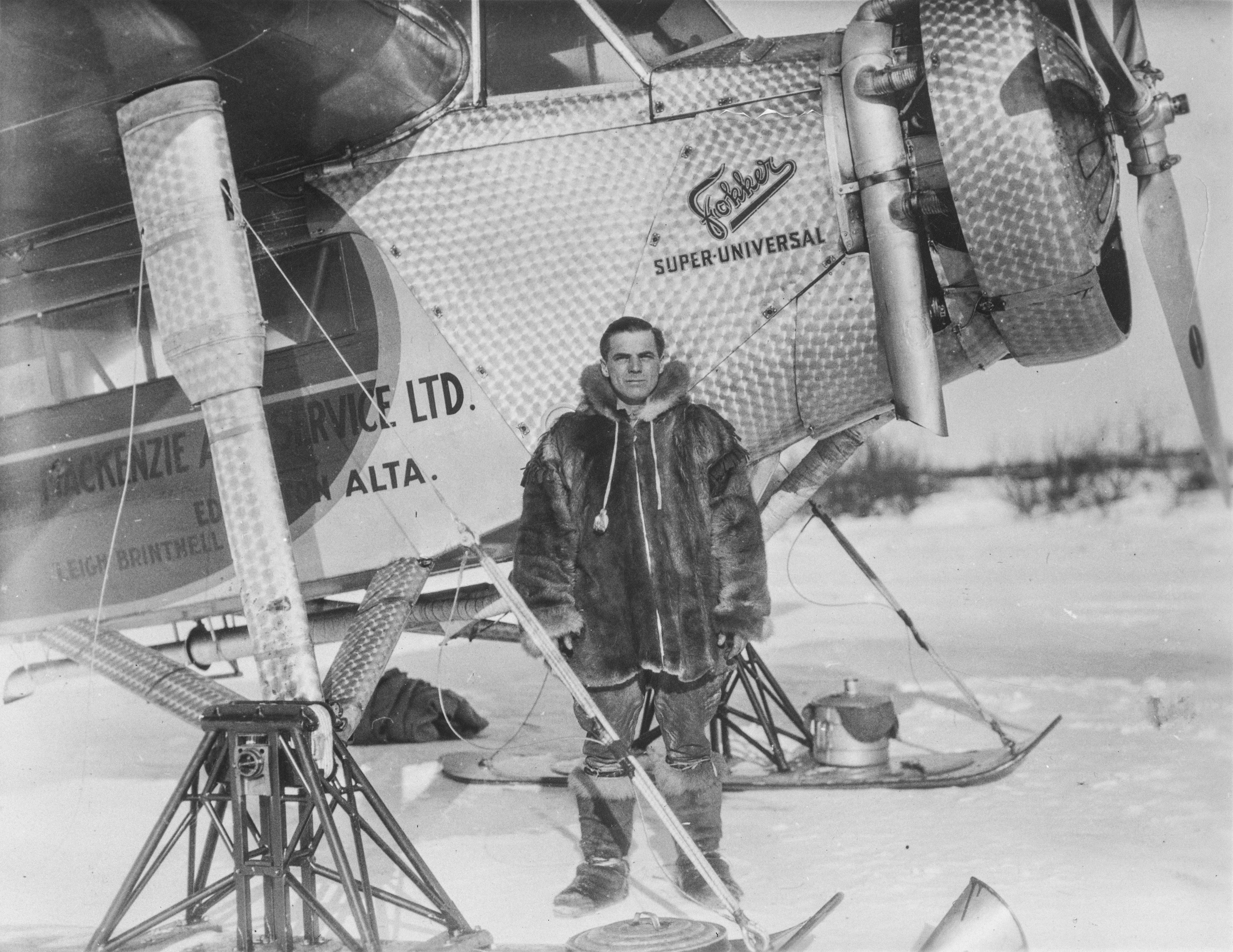
Fokker Super Universal in Alberta, Canada 1935. The person is famous Canadian aviator Leigh Brintnell

The Fokker Super Universal is an airliner produced in the United States in the late 1920s by Fokker America, an enlarged and improved version of the Fokker Universal, fitted with cantilever wings and an enclosed cockpit. It was also called the Model 8. It was subsequently also manufactured under license in Canada, and in Japan as the Nakajima–Fokker Super Universal and for the IJAAF as the Nakajima Ki-6 and later in the puppet state of Manchukuo as the Manshū Super Universal. It was used on the Byrd Antarctic expedition and was one of the most produced of the Fokker America models.

== Design and development ==
The Super Universal was a conventional, high-wing cantilever monoplane with a fully enclosed flight deck and cabin and a fixed undercarriage. Improvements over its forerunner included an enclosed cockpit and a new wing that eliminated the requirement for struts, bringing it in line with the rest of Fokker's designs. The preceding Fokker Universal was built with an open cockpit but many were converted.

Construction was as per standard Fokker practice, with the wing being made almost entirely of wood with two main spars and light ribs covered in thin sheets of plywood. The fuselage was built up from welded steel tubes, largely cross-braced with wires. Fairings, the floor and an internal bulkhead separating the pilot from the cabin were wood. A triangular-shaped door gave the pilot access to the cabin. The tail was also built up from steel tubing but used no internal bracing. The main structural members were larger diameter tubes, while smaller tubes gave the structure a small degree of camber. The standard undercarriage consisted of a tailskid with divided main gear legs sprung with bungee cords and attached to the wings and the fuselage, but floats or skis could also be fitted. (see also floatplane)

It was also called the Fokker Model 8.

== Operational history ==
The first Fokker Model 8 Super Universal, was used on the Byrd expedition to the Antarctic, and called the Virginia. It arrived but was destroyed by a freak wind gust that blew it over a kilometer away from where it was tied down. The wreck was found frozen in the ice in 1988.

The Super Universal was received enthusiastically in the marketplace, selling better than any other of Fokker-America's designs (some 80 aircraft), and required the company to expand its factory space to meet demand.

A further 15 aircraft were built by Canadian Vickers, and around 100 were built by Nakajima with some of these Japanese aircraft seeing military service as the Ki-6. The United States Navy also evaluated the Super Universal for military service, under the designation XJA-1, but decided not to purchase the type (the JA designation was later reused for the Noorduyn Norseman). The Fokker Universal was popular as a bush plane and many found their way into the Canadian north.

The first production Super Universal was named the Virginia by Richard E. Byrd and taken to the Antarctic in 1928. This aircraft was damaged after being ripped from its tiedowns and thrown backwards over one kilometre in winds estimated to have been at least 150 mph, and was abandoned, although Byrd subsequently revisited it to salvage useful parts.

For the operational history of the versions used by Japan and Manchukuo, see the Nakajima Ki-6 article.

The Fokker Super Universal which made up TWA fleet of airplanes were dealt a big blow, when one another Fokker design, the Fokker F-10, crashed near Bazaar, Kansas on March 31, 1931, with Knute Rockne, famous Notre Dame Football coach while en route to participate in the production of the film The Spirit of Notre Dame. Both pilots and all six passengers were killed. A long, thorough and well-publicized investigation concluded that the Fokker, operated by a company of the newly-formed TWA, broke up due to fatigue cracks in its famous cantilever stressed plywood wing, around where one of the engine mounting struts joined. However, questions about the crash due the exact weather conditions (it had actually turned back due to conditions) and other aspects have led to discussions about what happened. (see also 1931 Transcontinental & Western Air Fokker F-10 crash)

The Fokker Super Universal fleet was inspected and grounded after similar cracks were found in many examples, ruining the manufacturer's American reputation (the Dutch designer Anthony Fokker was then in business in Hasbrouck Heights, New Jersey). This resulted in a complete overhaul of standards for new transport aircraft and led to the use of all-metal construction in commercial aircraft such as the Boeing 247 and Douglas DC-2

== Surviving aircraft ==
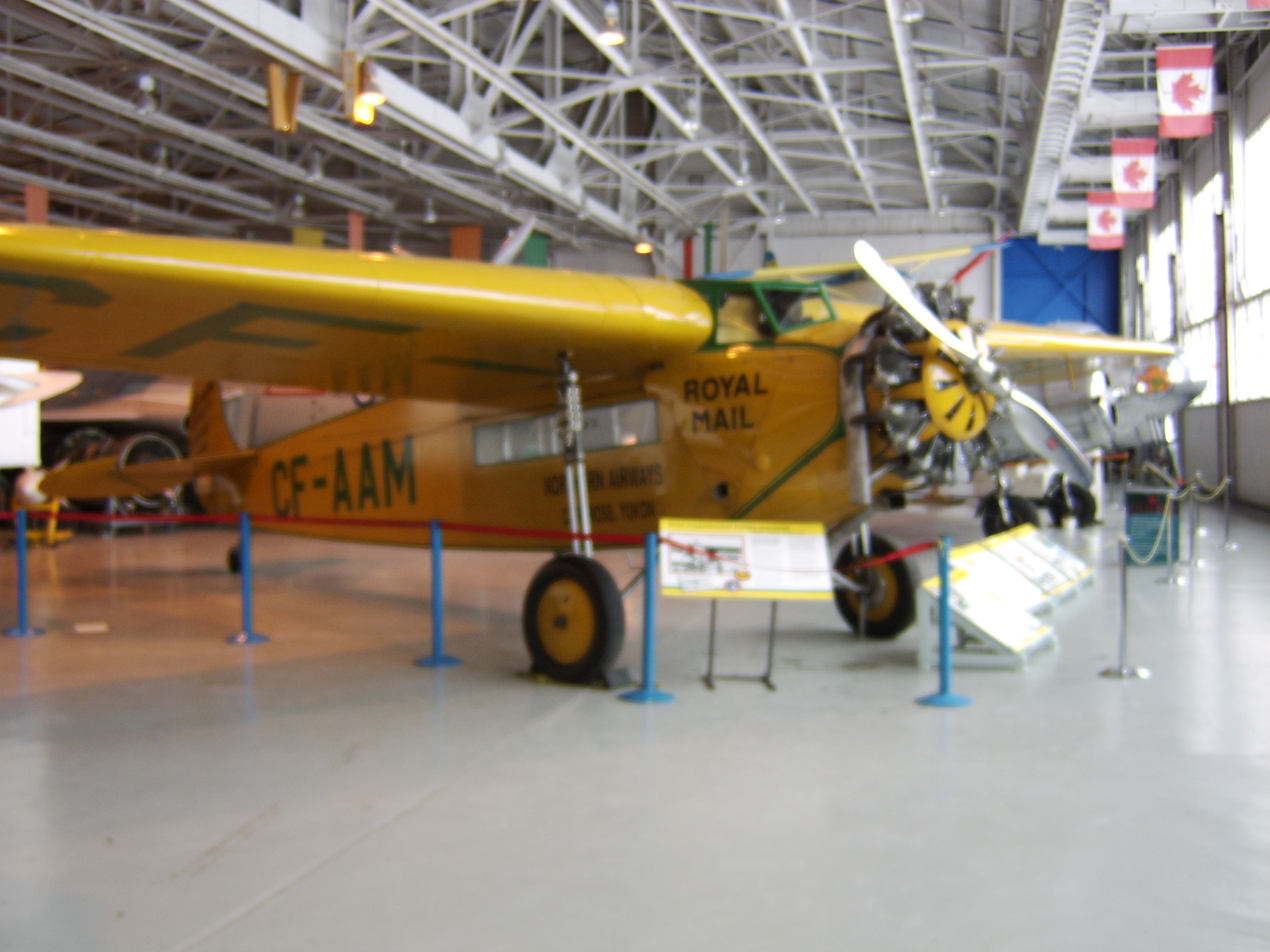
The last Fokker Super Universal, at a museum

In 1998, a Super Universal originally used for mineral exploration in Canada's north was restored to airworthy condition in Alberta and after being flown for a few years was placed on display at the Royal Aviation Museum of Western Canada in 2005. Byrd's Fokker Universal was rediscovered by a New Zealand expedition in 1987 and the Antarctic Aviation Preservation Society had intended to salvage and restore it but that group is inactive and the aircraft remains have not been recovered. Fokker “Super Universal” registration #NC9792 of Wien Alaska Airlines which crashed and was abandoned in 1939 was salvaged in 1984 and although much of the wood and fabric structure had rotted away the steel tube fuselage, cockpit enclosure, undercarriage and engine were all recovered and remain on static "as found" display at the Pioneer Air Museum in Fairbanks Alaska USA.

== In popular culture ==
- In the 1942 film Casablanca, General Strasser arrives to Casablanca in a Fokker Super Universal.

== Variants ==
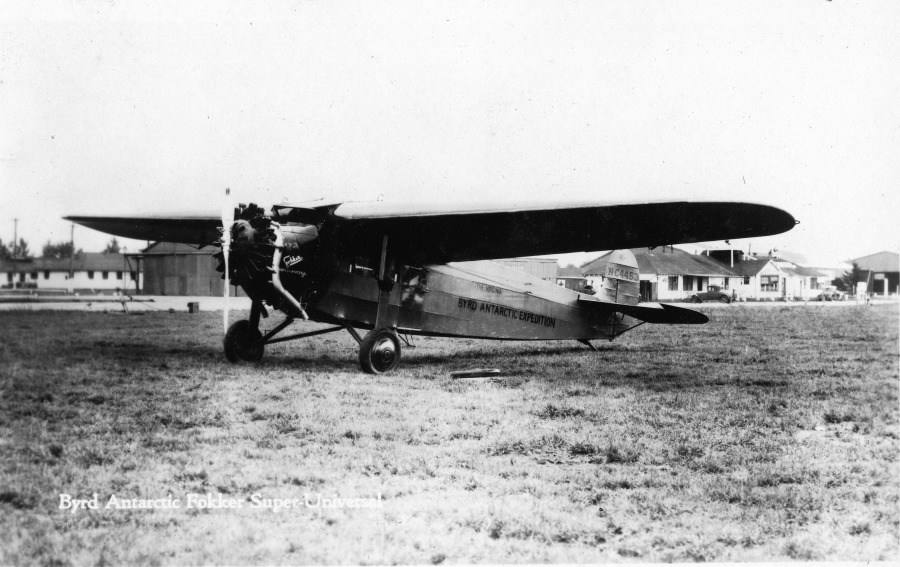
The first Fokker Super Universal, the Virginia that was sent and lost in Antarctica in 1929

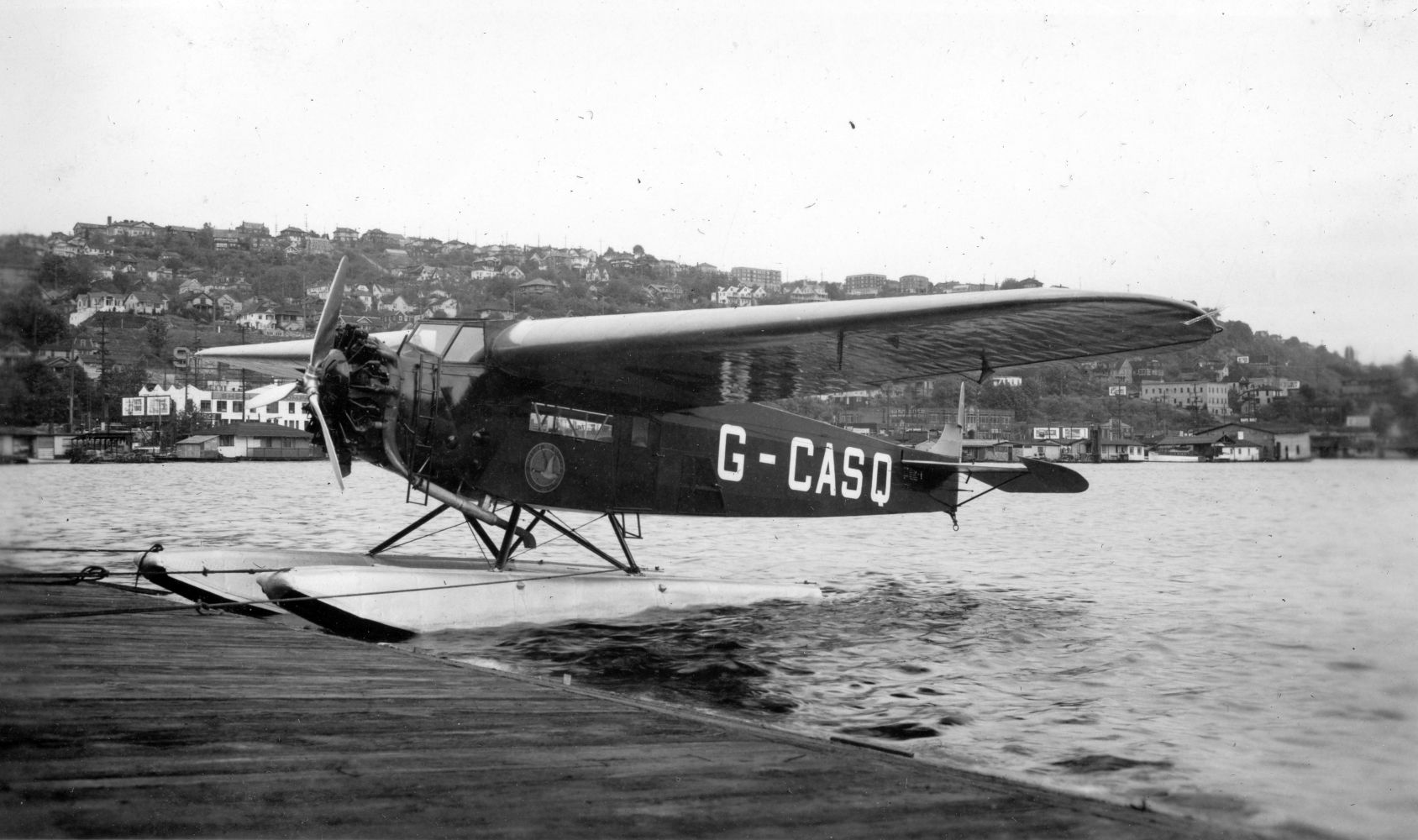
Western Canada Airways Fokker Super Universal, floatplane version

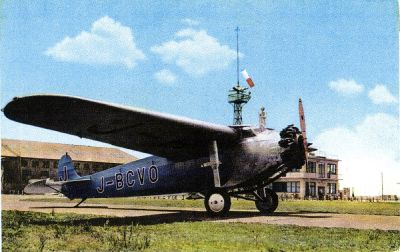
Postcard featuring the Nakajima Ki-6

XJA-1
A Super Universal evaluated by the United States Navy
Nakajima Super Universal
Civilian transport
Ki-6 (Army Type 95 training aircraft)
Military transport for the IJAAF
Nakajima–Fokker Super Universal
Nakajima–Fokker ambulance aircraft
Nakajima Navy Fokker reconnaissance aircraft
Short designation C2N1 and C2N2
C2N1 (Navy land-based reconnaissance aircraft)
Land-based recon and military transport for the IJN
C2N2 (Navy reconnaissance seaplane)
Land-based recon and military transport for the IJN
Manshū Super Universal
Civil and military transport built in Manchukuo (Manchuria)

== Operators ==
=== Civil ===
Canada

- Canadian Airways
- Canadian Vickers
- Northern Transportation Company
- Starratt Airways
- Western Canada Airways

Colombia

- SCADTA

Japan

- Japan Air Transport

Manchukuo

- Manchukuo National Airways

United States

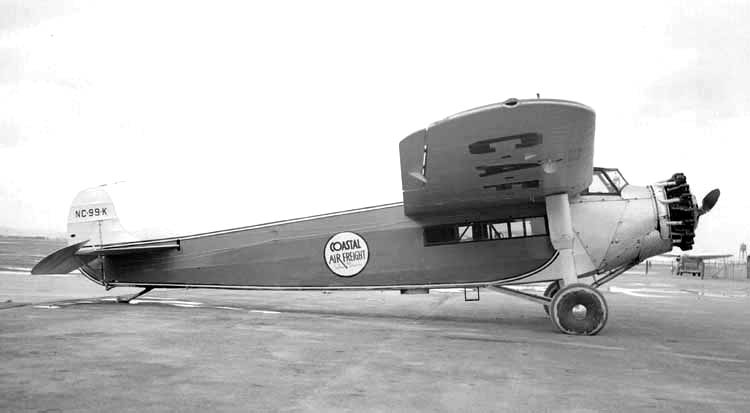
Coastal Air Freight Fokker Super Universal

- Coastal Air Freight
- Goodyear Tire and Rubber Company
- Byrd Antarctic Expedition
- Mid-Continent Air Express
- Standard Air Lines
- National Parks Airways
- Universal Air Lines

South Africa

- Union Airways

=== Military ===
Argentina

- Armada Argentina

Canada

- Royal Canadian Air Force

China-Nanjing

- The Reorganized Republic of China Air Force operated one example.

Japan

- Imperial Japanese Army Air Service
- Imperial Japanese Navy Air Service

United States

- United States Navy

== Specifications ==
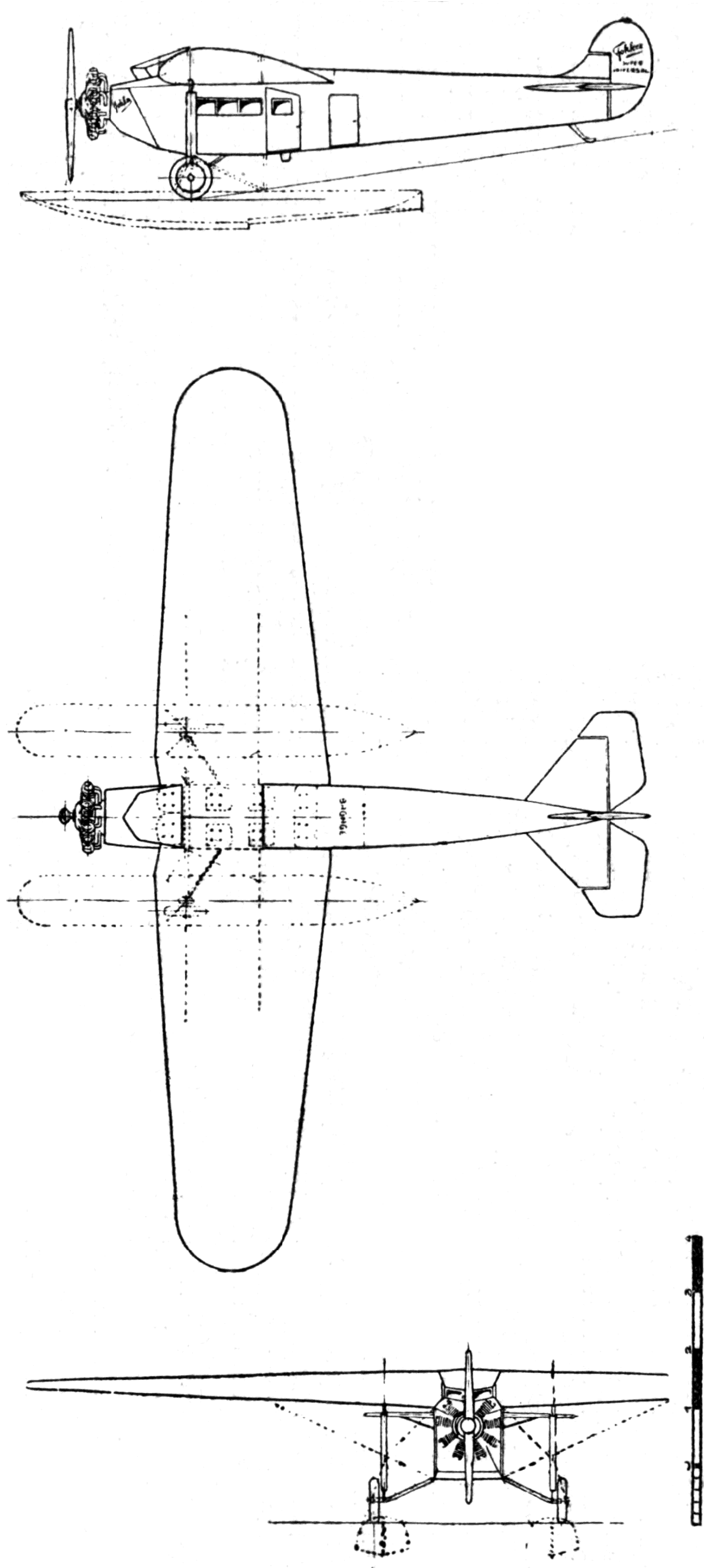
Fokker Super Universal 3-view drawing from L'Aérophile August,1928

Data from Pioneering in Canadian Air Transport

General characteristics

- Crew: two
- Capacity: six passengers or 1,323 lb/600 kg cargo
- Length: 36 ft 11 in (11.25 m)
- Wingspan: 50 ft 8 in (15.44 m)
- Height: 9 ft 1 in (2.77 m)
- Wing area: 370 sq ft (34.3 m^{2})
- Empty weight: 3,250 lb (1,474 kg)
- Gross weight: 5,550 lb (2,517 kg)
- Powerplant: 1 × Pratt & Whitney Wasp B air-cooled radial piston engine , 450 hp (336 kW)

Performance

- Maximum speed: 138 mph (222 km/h, 120 kn)
- Range: 680 mi (1,090 km, 590 nmi)
- Service ceiling: 19,340 ft (5,900 m)
- Rate of climb: 950 ft/min (4.8 m/s)
