= Yeouido Airport =

Former airport of Seoul, South Korea (1916–1971)

Yeouido Airport 여의도비행장
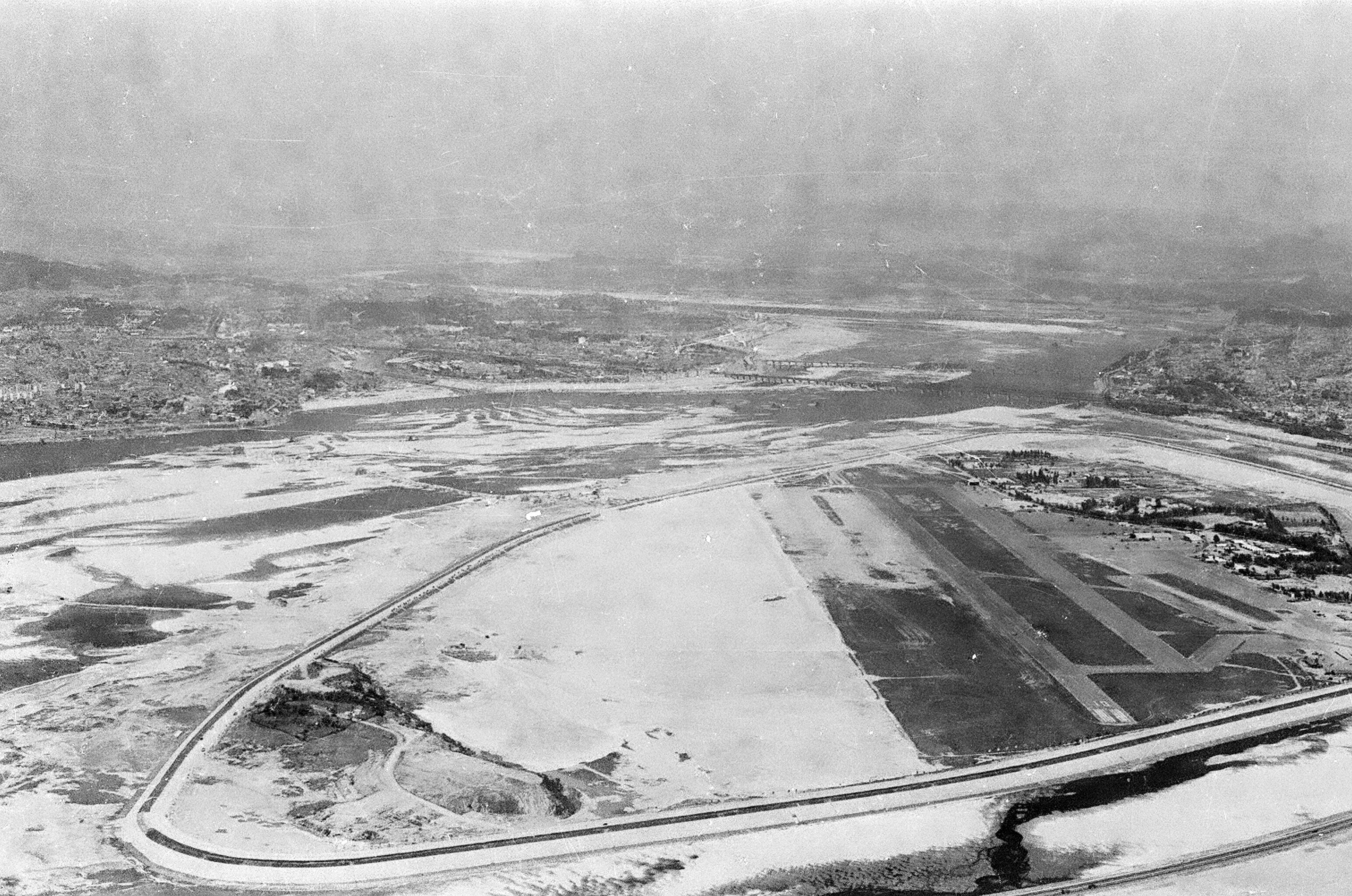
- IATA: none; ICAO: none

Summary
- Airport type: Defunct
- Operator: Imperial Japanese Army Air Service (1916–1929?); Japanese Governor-General of Korea Department of Posts and Telecommunications (1929? – 1945?); U.S. Fifth Air Force (1945? – 1958); Republic of Korea Air Force (1958–1971)
- Serves: Seoul metropolitan area
- Location: Yeongdeungpo, Seoul, South Korea
- Opened: October 1916
- Closed: February 1971
- Passenger services ceased: January 30, 1958
- Coordinates: 37°31′33″N 126°55′19″E

Maps
- Location in modern Seoul
- Location in modern South Korea Yeouido Airport (Asia) Yeouido Airport (Earth)
- Demolished in 1971, the site is now part of Yeouido Park, KBS headquarters and MBC headquarters.

- Yeouido Airport
- Hangul: 여의도비행장
- Hanja: 汝矣島飛行場
- RR: Yeouido bihaengjang
- MR: Yŏŭido pihaengjang

Yeouido Airport (Korean: 여의도비행장) was an international airport in Yeouido, Seoul, South Korea. It operated as an international airport from 1929 to 1958, and thereafter as a military base until 1971. The former airport has been redeveloped into a business district and Yeouido Park.

== History ==
The Imperial Japanese Army constructed an airstrip on Yeouido in 1916. At the time, the island was predominantly farmland but was also used as an Imperial Army training base.

Japanese authorities significantly upgraded the facility in 1929, along with a number of other airfields in Korea, to serve as stops for air service to Manchuria. Japan Air Transport (later as Imperial Japanese Airways) provided scheduled flights to Tokyo (beginning 1929), Fukuoka, Mukden, Dalian, Xinjing and other destinations from the airport during the 1930s. The much larger Kimpo Airfield opened to Japanese military traffic in 1943, and Yeouido was thereafter officially known as Keijo No. 2 Airfield (京城第2飛行場).

After World War II, the airfield became a base of operations for Korean National Airlines (KNA/Koreanair), which operated international flights to Hong Kong and domestic flights to Pusan, Kangnung, Kwangju and Cheju. Northwest Orient Airlines operated Seoul-Tokyo flights in the 1950s, providing onward connections to North America.

The airport was prone to flooding that made it unusable during the summer rainy season. Gimpo International Airport took over Yeouido's commercial flights in 1958, and Seoul Air Base took over its military functions in 1971.

== Former airlines and destinations (before 1958) ==
Airlines	Destinations
Imperial Japanese Airways	Xinjing (Manchukuo), Mukden, Tokyo
Korean National Airlines	Cheju, Hong Kong, Kangnung, Kwangju, Pusan; Charter: Manila
Northwest Orient Airlines	Tokyo

Imperial Japanese Airways operated until 1945 when operations ceased by US occupation. KNA operated from 1948 onwards. Northwest began service in 1947 when civil flights resumed in Japan.
